= Boeing 767 =

Twin-aisle airliner family

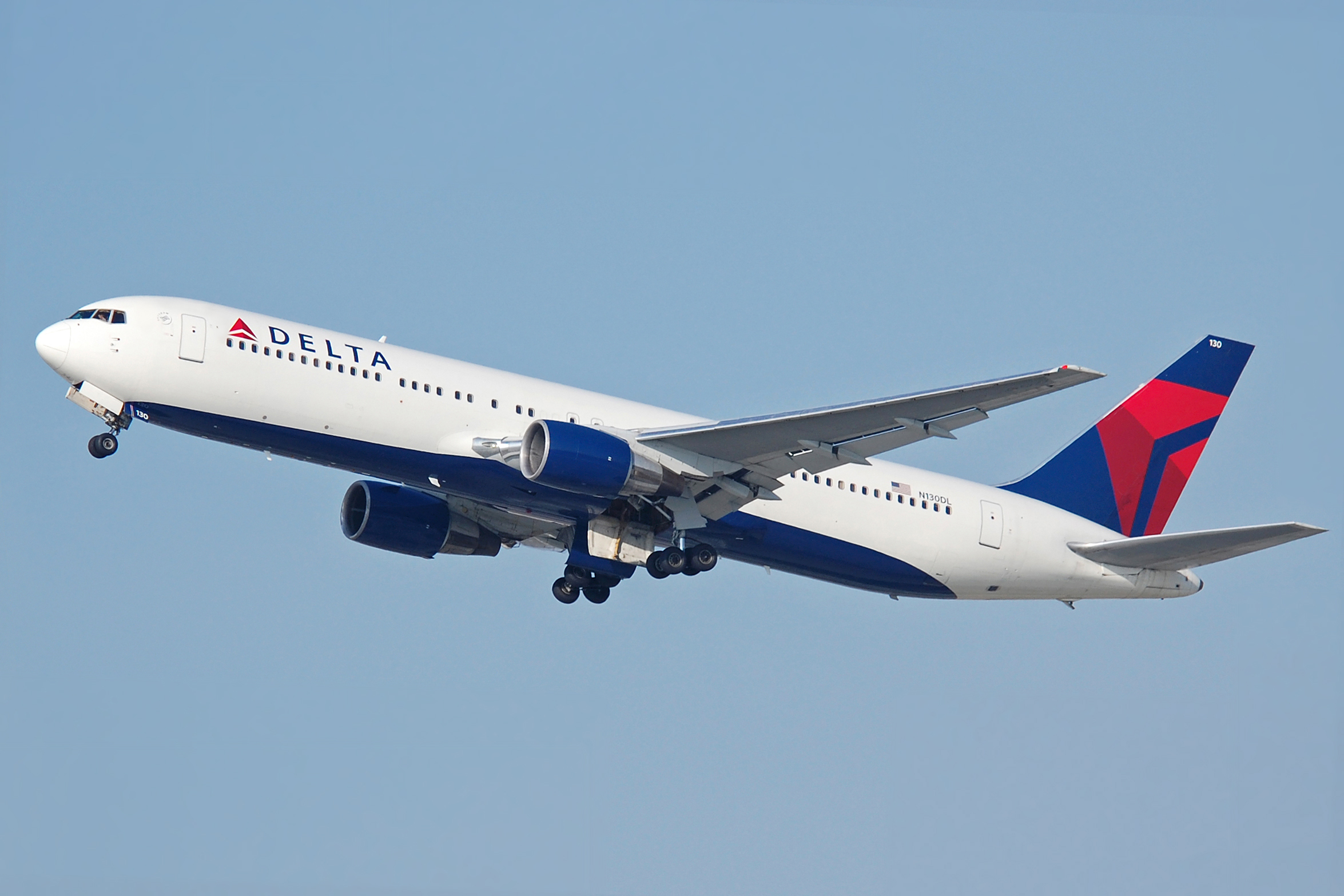
- Boeing 767-300 of Delta Air Lines, the largest passenger operator of the 767 as of 2026

General information
- Type: Wide-body airliner
- National origin: United States
- Manufacturer: Boeing Commercial Airplanes
- Status: In service; cargo and military variants in production
- Primary users: Delta Air Lines FedEx Express; UPS Airlines; United Airlines
- Number built: 1,380 as of October 2026

History
- Manufactured: 1981–present
- Introduction date: September 8, 1982 with United Airlines
- First flight: September 26, 1981; 45 years ago
- Variants: Boeing E-767; Boeing KC-46 Pegasus; Boeing KC-767; Northrop Grumman E-10 MC2A
- Successors: Boeing 787

The Boeing 767 is an American wide-body airliner developed and manufactured by Boeing Commercial Airplanes. The airliner design was launched as the 7X7 program on July 14, 1978, the prototype first flew on September 26, 1981, and it was certified on July 30, 1982. The initial 767-200 variant entered service on September 8, 1982, with United Airlines, and the extended-range 767-200ER in 1984. It was stretched into the 767-300 in October 1986, followed by the extended-range 767-300ER in 1988, the most popular variant. The 767-300F, a production freighter version, debuted in October 1995. It was stretched again into the 767-400ER in September 2000.

Designed to complement the larger 747, it has a seven-abreast cross-section accommodating smaller LD2 ULD cargo containers. The 767 is Boeing's first wide-body twinjet, powered by General Electric CF6, Rolls-Royce RB211, or Pratt & Whitney JT9D turbofans. JT9D engines were eventually replaced by PW4000 engines. The aircraft has a conventional tail and a supercritical wing for reduced aerodynamic drag. Its two-crew glass cockpit, a first for a Boeing airliner, was developed jointly for the 757 − a narrow-body aircraft, allowing a common pilot type rating. Studies for a higher-capacity 767 in 1986 led Boeing to develop the larger 777 twinjet, introduced in June 1995.

The 159-foot-long (48.5 m) 767-200 typically seats 216 passengers over 3,900 nautical miles [nmi] (7,200 km; 4,500 mi), while the 767-200ER seats 181 over a 6,590 nmi (12,200 km; 7,580 mi) range. The 180-foot-long (54.9 m) 767-300 typically seats 269 passengers over 3,900 nmi (7,200 km; 4,500 mi), while the 767-300ER seats 218 over 5,980 nmi (11,070 km; 6,880 mi). The 767-300F can haul 116,000 lb (52.7 t) over 3,225 nmi (6,025 km; 3,711 mi), and the 201.3-foot-long (61.37 m) 767-400ER typically seats 245 passengers over 5,625 nmi (10,415 km; 6,473 mi). Military derivatives include the E-767 for surveillance and the KC-767 and KC-46 aerial tankers.

Initially marketed for transcontinental routes, a loosening of ETOPS rules starting in 1985 allowed the aircraft to operate transatlantic flights. A total of 742 of these aircraft were in service in July 2018, with Delta Air Lines being the largest operator with 77 aircraft in its fleet. As of October 2026, Boeing has received 1,451 orders from 74 customers, of which 1,380 airplanes have been delivered, while the remaining orders are for cargo or tanker variants. Competitors have included the Airbus A300, A310, and A330-200. Its successor, the 787 Dreamliner, entered service in 2011.

== Development ==
=== Background ===
In 1970, the 747 entered service as the first wide-body jetliner with a fuselage wide enough to feature a twin-aisle cabin. Two years later, the manufacturer began a development study, code-named 7X7, for a new wide-body jetliner intended to replace the 707 and other early generation narrow-body airliners. The aircraft would also provide twin-aisle seating, but in a smaller fuselage than the existing 747, McDonnell Douglas DC-10, and Lockheed L-1011 TriStar wide-bodies. To defray the high cost of development, Boeing signed risk-sharing agreements with Italian corporation Aeritalia and the Civil Transport Development Corporation (CTDC), a consortium of Japanese aerospace companies. This marked the manufacturer's first major international joint venture, and both Aeritalia and the CTDC received supply contracts in return for their early participation. The initial 7X7 was conceived as a short take-off and landing airliner intended for short-distance flights, but customers were unenthusiastic about the concept, leading to its redefinition as a mid-size, transcontinental-range airliner. At this stage the proposed aircraft featured two or three engines, with possible configurations including over-wing engines and a T-tail.

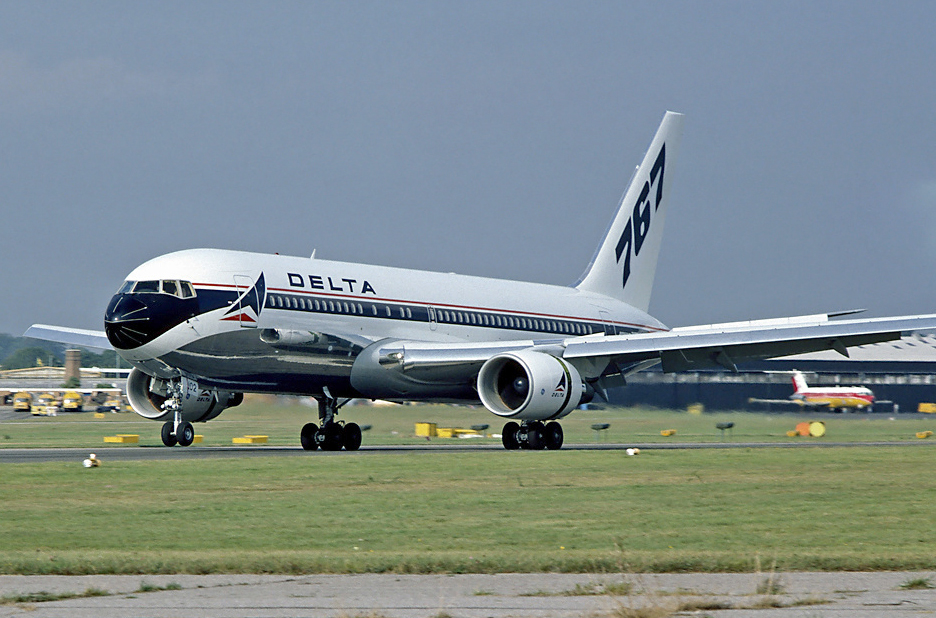
The 767-200 pictured here made its Farnborough Airshow debut in 1982. Later it was named the Spirit of Delta Ship 102 with Delta Air Lines.

By 1976, a twinjet layout, similar to the one which had debuted on the Airbus A300, became the baseline configuration. The decision to use two engines reflected increased industry confidence in the reliability and economics of new-generation jet powerplants. While airline requirements for new wide-body aircraft remained ambiguous, the 7X7 was generally focused on mid-size, high-density markets. As such, it was intended to transport large numbers of passengers between major cities. Advancements in civil aerospace technology, including high-bypass-ratio turbofan engines, new flight deck systems, aerodynamic improvements, and more efficient lightweight designs were to be applied to the 7X7. Many of these features were also included in a parallel development effort for a new mid-size narrow-body airliner, code-named 7N7, which would become the 757. Work on both proposals proceeded through the airline industry upturn in the late 1970s.

In January 1978, Boeing announced a major extension of its Everett factory—which was then dedicated to manufacturing the 747—to accommodate its new wide-body family. In February 1978, the new jetliner received the 767 model designation, and three variants were planned: a 767-100 with 190 seats, a 767-200 with 210 seats, and a trijet 767MR/LR version with 200 seats intended for intercontinental routes. The 767MR/LR was subsequently renamed 777 for differentiation purposes. The 767 was officially launched on July 14, 1978, when United Airlines ordered 30 of the 767-200 variant, followed by 50 more 767-200 orders from American Airlines and Delta Air Lines later that year. The 767-100 was ultimately not offered for sale, as its capacity was too close to the 757's seating, while the 777 trijet was eventually dropped in favor of standardizing the twinjet configuration.

=== Design effort ===
In the late 1970s, operating cost replaced capacity as the primary factor in airliner purchases. As a result, the 767's design process emphasized fuel efficiency from the outset. Boeing targeted a 20 to 30 percent cost saving over earlier aircraft, mainly through new engine and wing technology. As development progressed, engineers used computer-aided design for over a third of the 767's design drawings, and performed 26,000 hours of wind tunnel tests. Design work occurred concurrently with the 757 twinjet, leading Boeing to treat both as almost one program to reduce risk and cost. Both aircraft would ultimately receive shared design features, including avionics, flight management systems, instruments, and handling characteristics. Combined development costs were estimated at $3.5 to $4 billion.

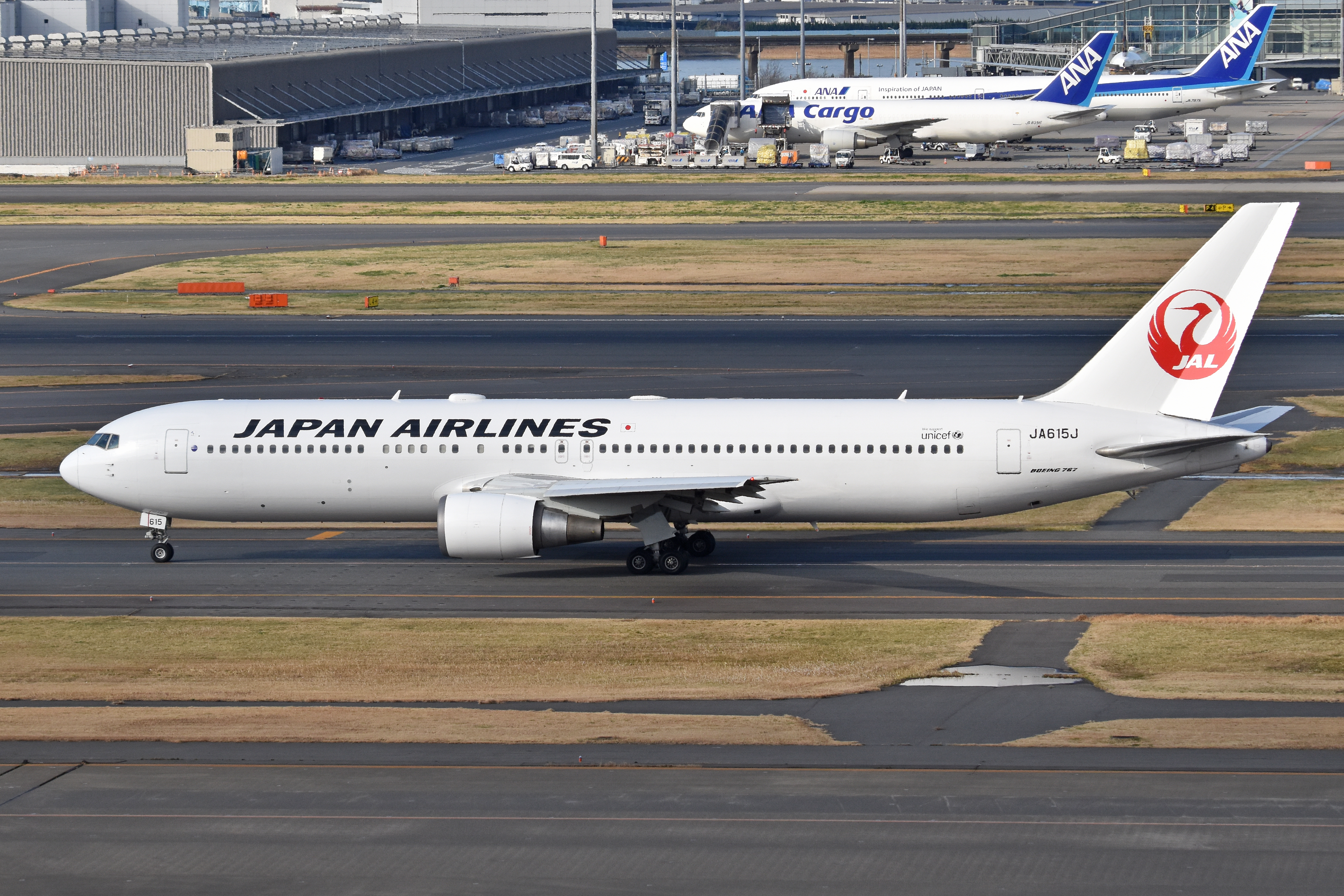
Side view of a Japan Airlines 767-300ER, with GE CF6 engines. In the background is also a 767-300ER serving ANA Cargo, having been converted into a freighter.

Early 767 customers were given the choice of Pratt & Whitney JT9D or General Electric CF6 turbofans, marking the first time that Boeing had offered more than one engine option at the launch of a new airliner. Both jet engine models had a maximum output of 48,000 pounds-force (210 kN) of thrust. The engines were mounted approximately one-third the length of the wing from the fuselage, similar to previous wide-body trijets. The larger wings were designed using an aft-loaded shape which reduced aerodynamic drag and distributed lift more evenly across their surface span than any of the manufacturer's previous aircraft. The wings provided higher-altitude cruise performance, added fuel capacity, and expansion room for future stretched variants. The initial 767-200 was designed for sufficient range to fly across North America or across the northern Atlantic, and would be capable of operating routes up to 3,850 nautical miles (7,130 km; 4,430 mi).

The 767's fuselage width was set midway between that of the 707 and the 747 at 16.5 feet (5.03 m). While it was narrower than previous wide-body designs, seven abreast seating with two aisles could be fitted, and the reduced width produced less aerodynamic drag. The fuselage was not wide enough to accommodate two standard LD3 wide-body unit load devices side-by-side, so a smaller container, the LD2, was created specifically for the 767. Using a conventional tail design also allowed the rear fuselage to be tapered over a shorter section, providing for parallel aisles along the full length of the passenger cabin, and eliminating irregular seat rows toward the rear of the aircraft.

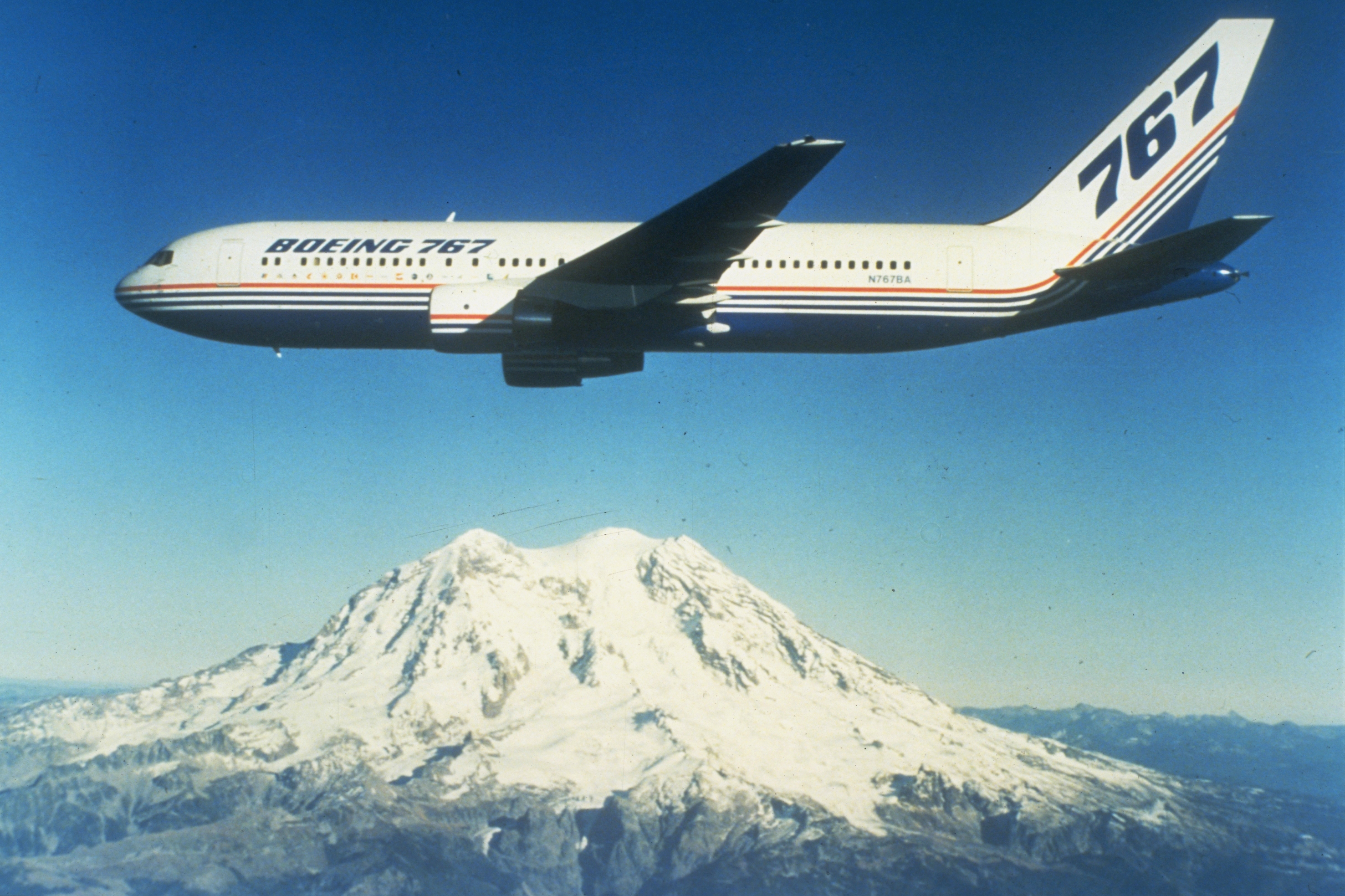
The first 767-200 built, N767BA, in flight near Mount Rainier c. 1982

The 767 was the first Boeing wide-body to be designed with a two-crew digital glass cockpit. Cathode ray tube (CRT) color displays and new electronics replaced the role of the flight engineer by enabling the pilot and co-pilot to monitor aircraft systems directly. Despite the promise of reduced crew costs, United Airlines initially demanded a conventional three-person cockpit, citing concerns about the risks associated with introducing a new aircraft. The carrier maintained this position until July 1981, when a US presidential task force determined that a crew of two was safe for operating wide-body jets. A three-crew cockpit remained as an option and was fitted to the first production models. Ansett Australia ordered 767s with three-crew cockpits due to union demands; it was the only airline to operate 767s so configured. The 767's two-crew cockpit was also applied to the 757, allowing pilots to operate both aircraft after a short conversion course, and adding incentive for airlines to purchase both types.

=== Production and testing ===
To produce the 767, Boeing formed a network of subcontractors which included domestic suppliers and international contributions from Italy's Aeritalia and Japan's CTDC. The wings and cabin floor were produced in-house, while Aeritalia provided control surfaces, Boeing Vertol made the leading edge for the wings, and Boeing Wichita produced the forward fuselage. The CTDC provided multiple assemblies through its constituent companies, namely Fuji Heavy Industries (wing fairings and gear doors), Kawasaki Heavy Industries (center fuselage), and Mitsubishi Heavy Industries (rear fuselage, doors, and tail). Components were integrated during final assembly at the Everett factory. For expedited production of wing spars, the main structural member of aircraft wings, the Everett factory received robotic machinery to automate the process of drilling holes and inserting fasteners. This method of wing construction expanded on techniques developed for the 747. Final assembly of the first aircraft began in July 1979.

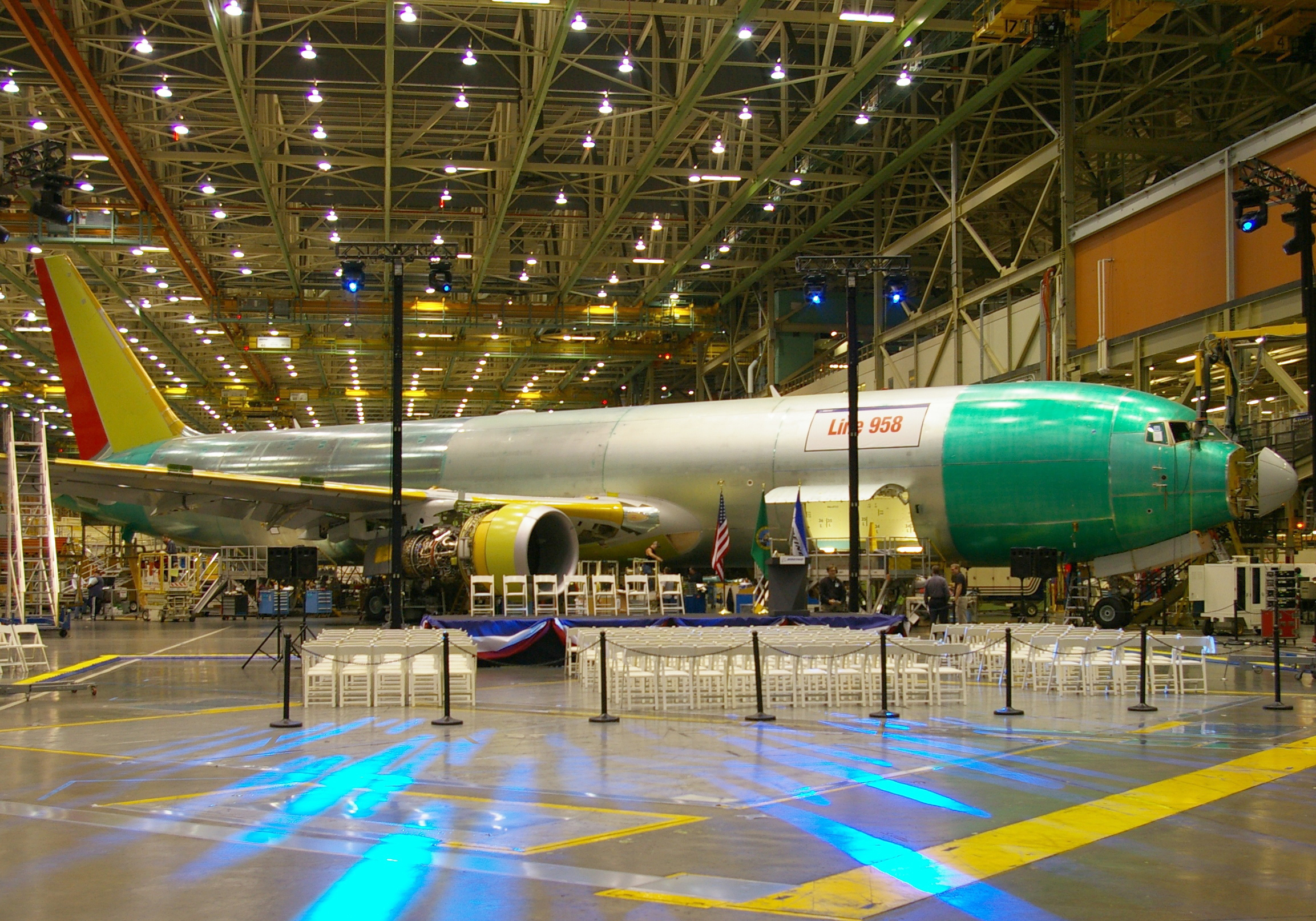
Final assembly of a 767-300F at Boeing's Everett factory in 2007. The factory was expanded for 767 production in 1978

The prototype aircraft, registered as N767BA and equipped with Pratt & Whitney JT9D turbofans, was rolled out on August 4, 1981. By this time, the 767 program had accumulated 173 firm orders from 17 customers, including Air Canada, All Nippon Airways, Britannia Airways, Transbrasil, and Trans World Airlines (TWA). On September 26, 1981, the prototype took its maiden flight under the command of company test pilots Tommy Edmonds, Lew Wallick, and John Brit. The maiden flight was largely uneventful, save for the inability to retract the landing gear because of a hydraulic fluid leak. The prototype was used for subsequent flight tests.

The 10-month 767 flight test program utilized the first six aircraft built. The first four aircraft were equipped with JT9D engines, while the fifth and sixth were fitted with CF6 engines. The test fleet was largely used to evaluate avionics, flight systems, handling, and performance, while the sixth aircraft was used for route-proving flights. During testing, pilots described the 767 as generally easy to fly, with its maneuverability unencumbered by the bulkiness associated with larger wide-body jets. Following 1,600 hours of flight tests, the JT9D-powered 767-200 received certification from the US Federal Aviation Administration (FAA) and the UK Civil Aviation Authority (CAA) in July 1982. The first delivery occurred on August 19, 1982, to United Airlines. The CF6-powered 767-200 received certification in September 1982, followed by the first delivery to Delta Air Lines on October 25, 1982.

=== Entry into service ===
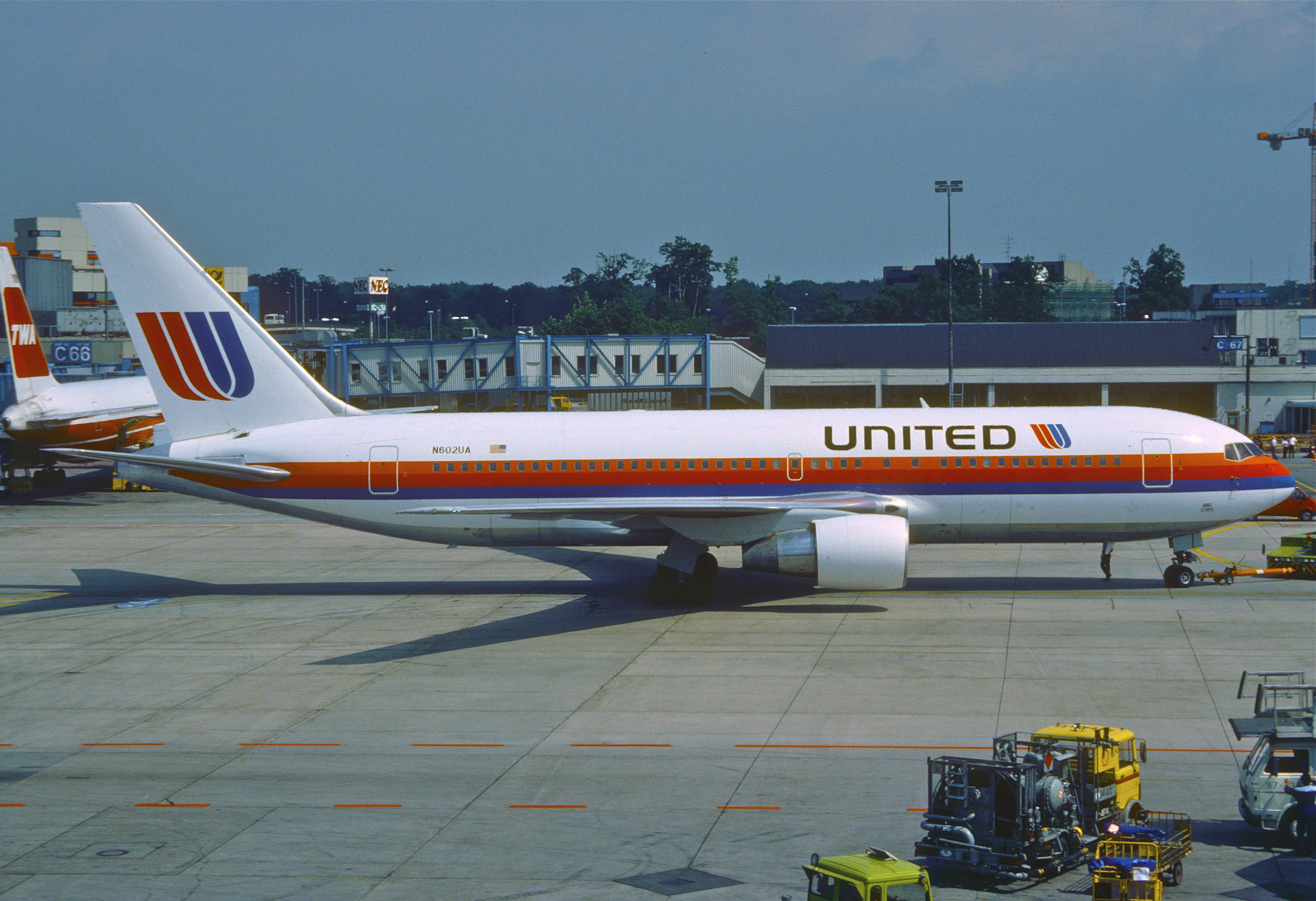
The 767-200 was introduced by United Airlines on September 8, 1982.

The 767 entered service with United Airlines on September 8, 1982. The aircraft's first commercial flight used a JT9D-powered 767-200 on the Chicago to Denver route. The CF6-powered 767-200 commenced service three months later with Delta Air Lines. Upon delivery, early 767s were mainly deployed on domestic routes, including US transcontinental services. American Airlines and TWA began flying the 767-200 in late 1982, while Air Canada, China Airlines, El Al, and Pacific Western began operating the aircraft in 1983. The aircraft's introduction was relatively smooth, with few operational glitches and greater dispatch reliability than prior jetliners.

=== Exemptions from major certification rule changes ===
Following the 1996 in-flight explosion of TWA Flight 800, the FAA introduced new rules about flammability reduction in 2008. In 2012, Boeing requested an exemption for the 767 from new wiring separation rules that would prevent ignition sources, because design improvements it introduced fell short of meeting such rules. One of the justification by Boeing: changes to the fuel quantity indication system would require a halt of delivery by three years as production of the 767 model was expected to end shortly. FAA gave the manufacturer three years to have a compliant system while deliveries continued. In 2014, Boeing, without a new design available, asked for and received another time-limited exemption for just the 767-300 and 767-300ER until 2019 when commercial production was expected to cease. But in 2017, with continual demand for the 767-300F, Boeing asked for another exemption up to the end of 2027, well past the revised production end date. It is noted that while Boeing requested extension of the original exemption from 2016 to 2019 based upon the cost of upgrading the design and their low production rate and ending production in 2019, Boeing developed the KC-46 tanker (based on the 767) which fully compliant with the new rulings and is assembled on the same production line as the 767. Since the 2019 exemption went into effect, Boeing has increased production of the freighter to satisfy demand.

=== Stretched derivatives ===
==== First stretch: -300/-300ER/F ====
Forecasting airline interest in larger-capacity models, Boeing announced the stretched 767-300 in 1983 and the extended-range 767-300ER in 1984. Both models offered a 20 percent passenger capacity increase, while the extended-range version was capable of operating flights up to 5,990 nautical miles (11,090 km; 6,890 mi). Japan Airlines placed the first order for the -300 in September 1983. Following its first flight on January 30, 1986, the type entered service with Japan Airlines on October 20, 1986. The 767-300ER completed its first flight on December 9, 1986, but it was not until March 1987 that the first firm order, from American Airlines, was placed. The type entered service with American Airlines on March 3, 1988. The 767-300 and 767-300ER gained popularity after entering service, and came to account for approximately two-thirds of all 767s sold. Until the 777's 1995 debut, the 767-300 and 767-300ER remained Boeing's second-largest wide-bodies behind the 747.

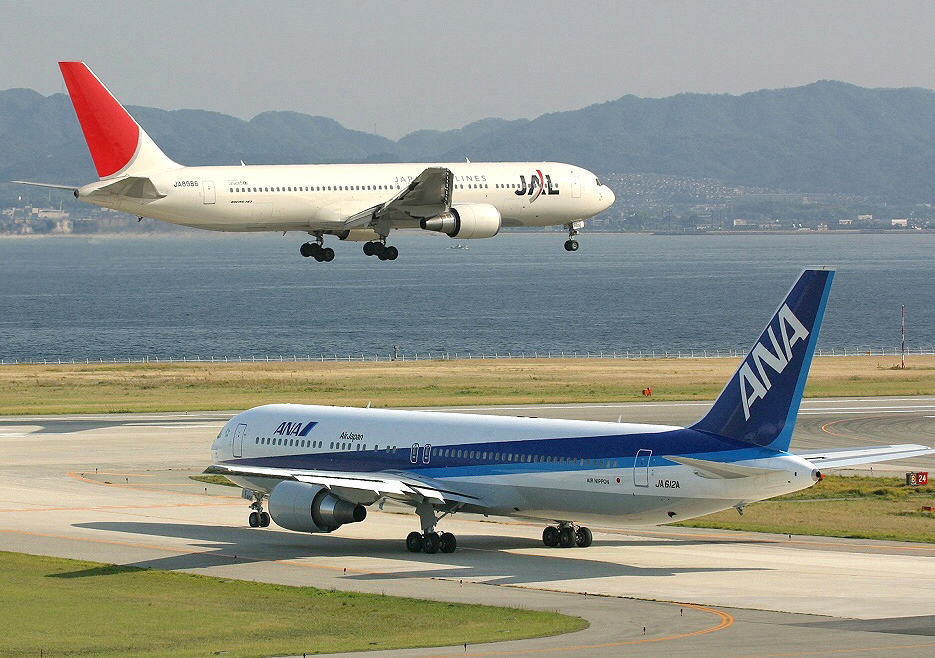
A JAL 767-300 lands in front of an ANA 767-300ER at Kansai Airport. The -300 and -300ER variants account for almost two-thirds of all 767s sold.

Buoyed by a recovering global economy and ETOPS approval, 767 sales accelerated in the mid-to-late 1980s; 1989 was the most prolific year with 132 firm orders. By the early 1990s, the wide-body twinjet had become its manufacturer's annual best-selling aircraft, despite a slight decrease due to economic recession. During this period, the 767 became the most common airliner for transatlantic flights between North America and Europe. By the end of the decade, 767s crossed the Atlantic more frequently than all other aircraft types combined. The 767 also propelled the growth of point-to-point flights which bypassed major airline hubs in favor of direct routes. Taking advantage of the aircraft's lower operating costs and smaller capacity, operators added non-stop flights to secondary population centers, thereby eliminating the need for connecting flights. The increased number of cities receiving non-stop services caused a paradigm shift in the airline industry as point-to-point travel gained prominence at the expense of the traditional hub-and-spoke model.

In February 1990, the first 767 equipped with Rolls-Royce RB211 turbofans, a 767-300, was delivered to British Airways. Six months later, the carrier temporarily grounded its entire 767 fleet after discovering cracks in the engine pylons of several aircraft. The cracks were related to the extra weight of the RB211 engines, which are 2,205 pounds (1,000 kg) heavier than other 767 engines. During the grounding, interim repairs were conducted to alleviate stress on engine pylon components, and a parts redesign in 1991 prevented further cracks. Boeing also performed a structural reassessment, resulting in production changes and modifications to the engine pylons of all 767s in service.

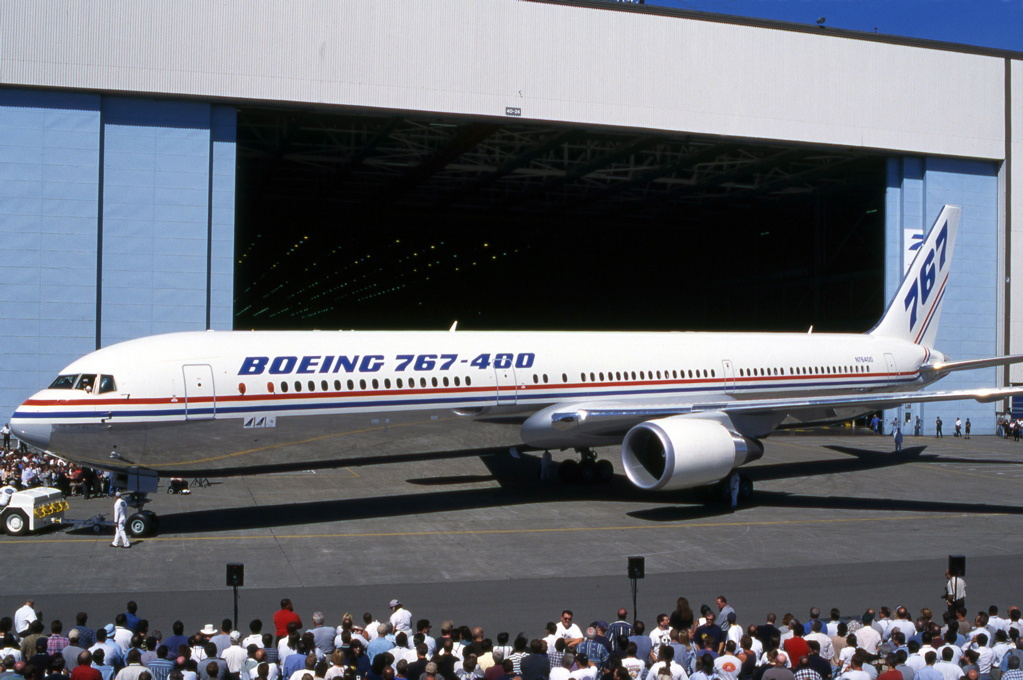
The Boeing 767-400ER was publicly unveiled on August 26, 1999.

In January 1993, following an order from UPS Airlines, Boeing launched a freighter variant, the 767-300F, which entered service with UPS on October 16, 1995. The 767-300F featured a main deck cargo hold, upgraded landing gear, and strengthened wing structure. In November 1993, the Japanese government launched the first 767 military derivative when it placed orders for the E-767, an Airborne Early Warning and Control (AWACS) variant based on the 767-200ER. The first two E-767s, featuring extensive modifications to accommodate surveillance radar and other monitoring equipment, were delivered in 1998 to the Japan Self-Defense Forces.

==== Second stretch:-400ER ====
In November 1995, after abandoning development of a smaller version of the 777, Boeing announced that it was revisiting studies for a larger 767. The proposed 767-400X, a second stretch of the aircraft, offered a 12 percent capacity increase versus the 767-300, and featured an upgraded flight deck, enhanced interior, and greater wingspan. The variant was specifically aimed at Delta Air Lines' pending replacement of its aging Lockheed L-1011 TriStars, and faced competition from the A330-200, a shortened derivative of the Airbus A330. In March 1997, Delta Air Lines launched the 767-400ER when it ordered the type to replace its L-1011 fleet. In October 1997, Continental Airlines also ordered the 767-400ER to replace its McDonnell Douglas DC-10 fleet. The type completed its first flight on October 9, 1999, and entered service with Continental Airlines on September 14, 2000.

=== Dreamliner introduction ===
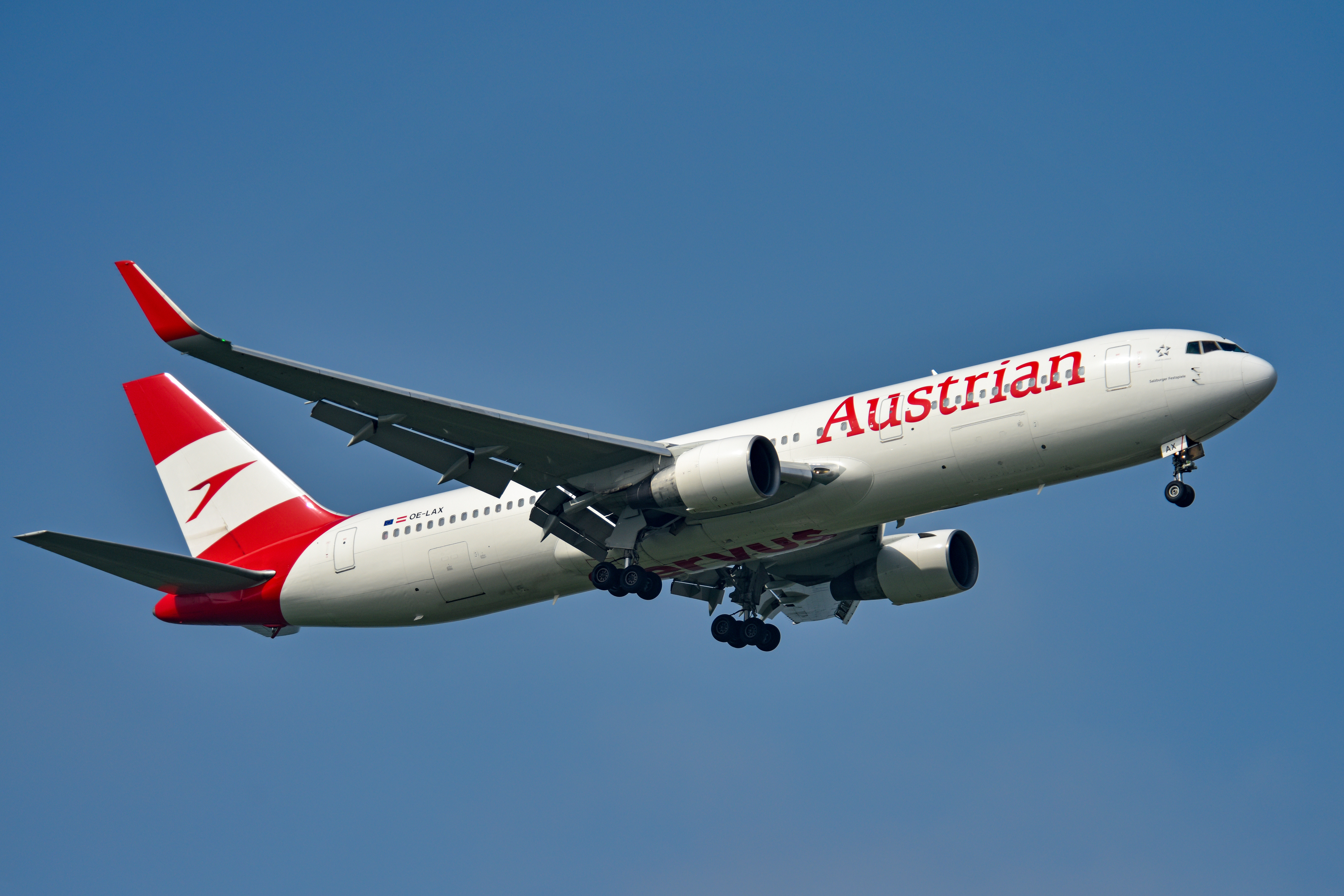
Austrian Airlines 767-300ER with blended winglets, which reduce lift-induced drag

In the early 2000s, cumulative 767 deliveries approached 900, but new sales declined during an airline industry downturn. In 2001, Boeing dropped plans for a longer-range model, the 767-400ERX, in favor of the proposed Sonic Cruiser, a new jetliner which aimed to fly 15 percent faster while having comparable fuel costs to the 767. The following year, Boeing announced the KC-767 Tanker Transport, a second military derivative of the 767-200ER. Launched with an order in October 2002 from the Italian Air Force, the KC-767 was intended for the dual role of refueling other aircraft and carrying cargo. The Japanese government became the second customer for the type in March 2003. In May 2003, the United States Air Force (USAF) announced its intent to lease KC-767s to replace its aging KC-135 tankers. The plan was suspended in March 2004 amid a conflict of interest scandal, resulting in multiple US government investigations and the departure of several Boeing officials, including Philip Condit, the company's chief executive officer, and chief financial officer Michael Sears. The first KC-767s were delivered in 2008 to the Japan Self-Defense Forces.

In late 2002, after airlines expressed reservations about its emphasis on speed over cost reduction, Boeing halted development of the Sonic Cruiser. The following year, the manufacturer announced the 7E7, a mid-size 767 successor made from composite materials which promised to be 20 percent more fuel efficient. The new jetliner was the first stage of a replacement aircraft initiative called the Boeing Yellowstone Project. Customers embraced the 7E7, later renamed 787 Dreamliner, and within two years it had become the fastest-selling airliner in the company's history. In 2005, Boeing opted to continue 767 production despite record Dreamliner sales, citing a need to provide customers waiting for the 787 with a more readily available option. Subsequently, the 767-300ER was offered to customers affected by 787 delays, including All Nippon Airways and Japan Airlines. Some aging 767s, exceeding 20 years in age, were also kept in service past planned retirement dates due to the delays. To extend the operational lives of older aircraft, airlines increased heavy maintenance procedures, including D-check teardowns and inspections for corrosion, a recurring issue on aging 767s. The first 787s entered service with All Nippon Airways in October 2011, 42 months behind schedule.

=== Continued production ===
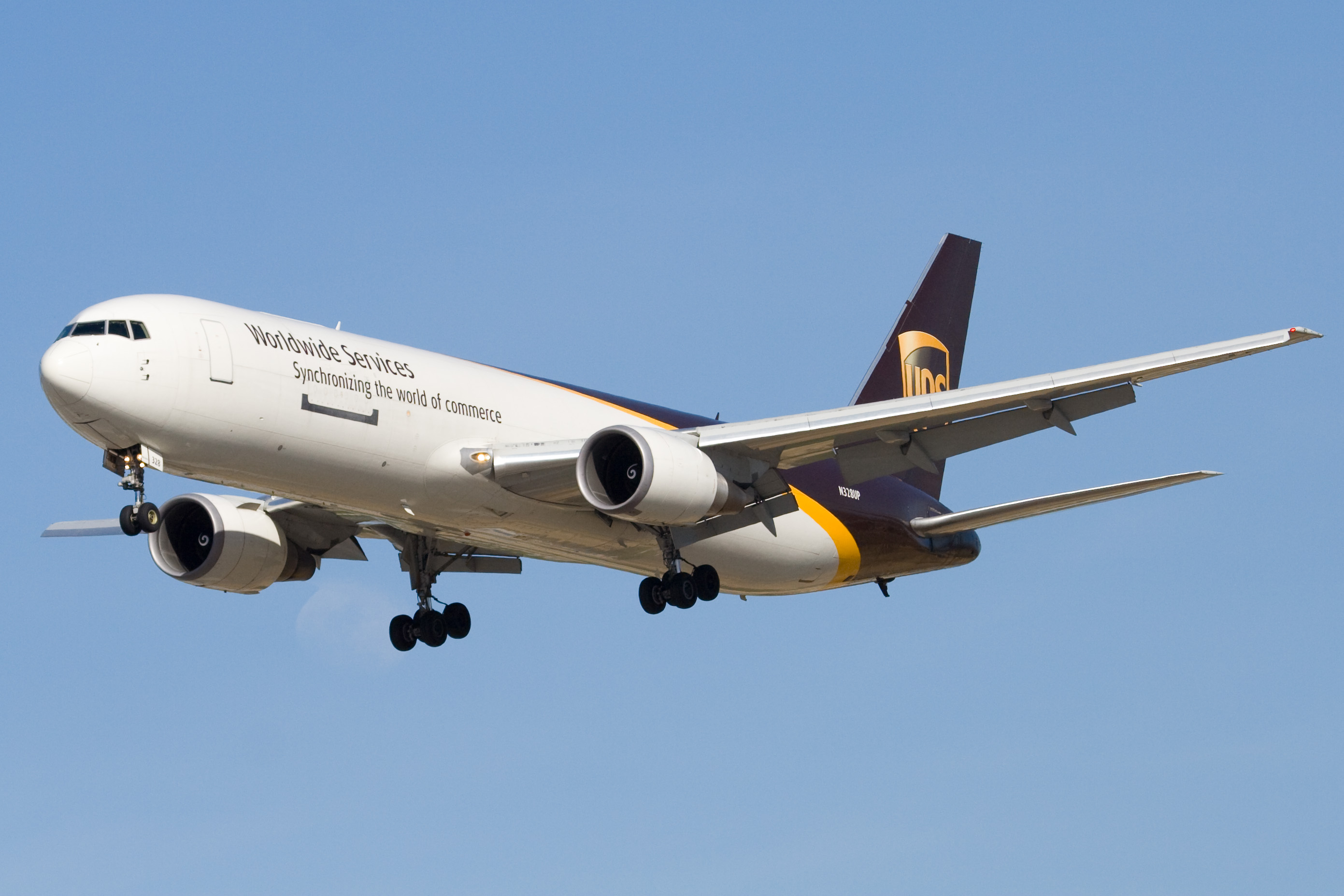
UPS, the largest 767-300F operator, placed additional orders in 2007.

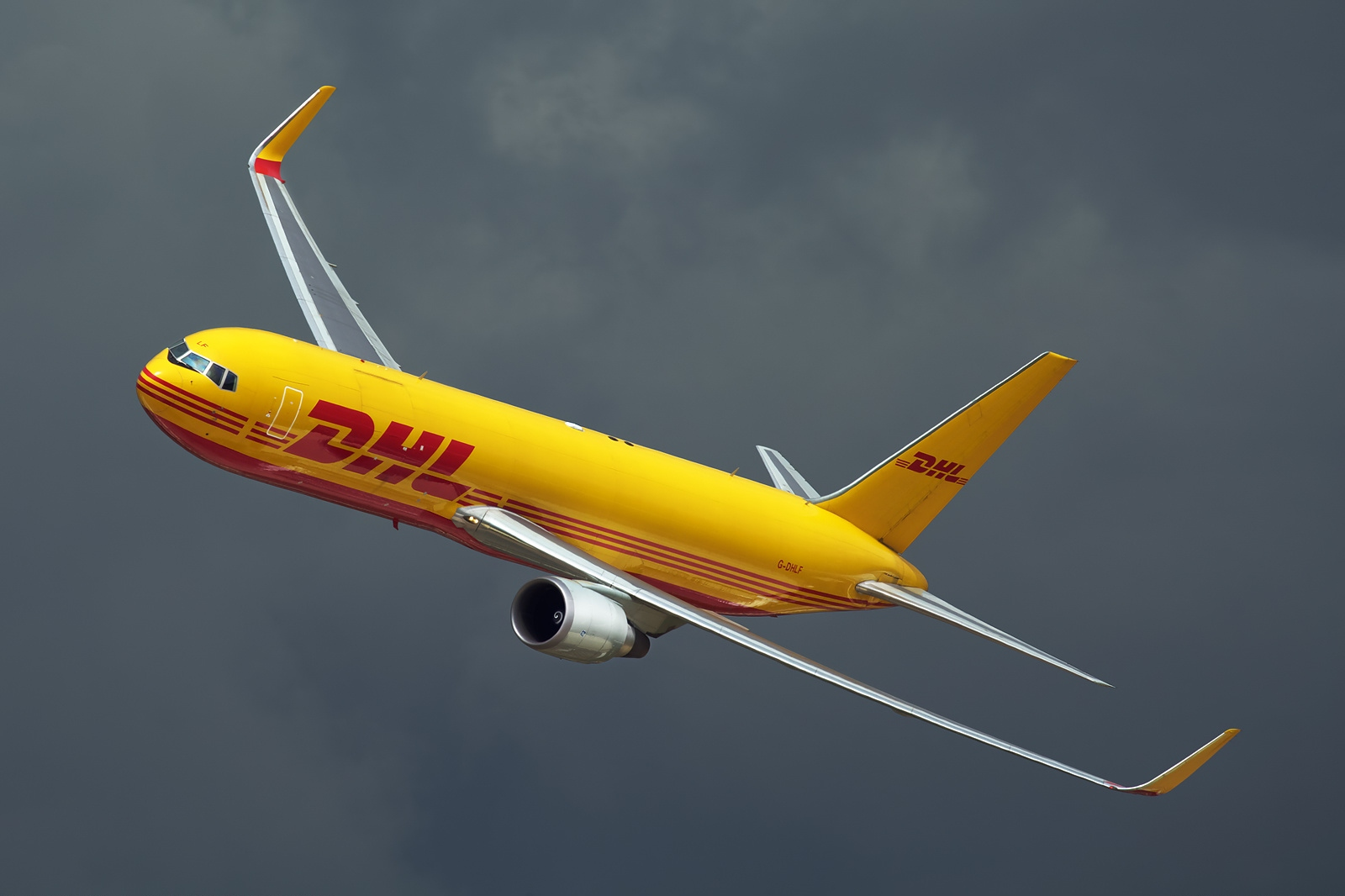
DHL Aviation 767-300F

In 2007, the 767 received a production boost when UPS and DHL Aviation placed a combined 33 orders for the 767-300F. Renewed freighter interest led Boeing to consider enhanced versions of the 767-200 and 767-300F with increased gross weights, 767-400ER wing extensions, and 777 avionics. Net orders for the 767 declined from 24 in 2008 to just three in 2010. During the same period, operators upgraded aircraft already in service; in 2008, the first 767-300ER retrofitted with blended winglets from Aviation Partners debuted with American Airlines. The manufacturer-sanctioned winglets, at 11 feet (3.35 m) in height, improved fuel efficiency by an estimated 6.5 percent. Other carriers including All Nippon Airways and Delta Air Lines also ordered winglet kits.

On February 2, 2011, the 1,000th 767 rolled out, destined for All Nippon Airways. The aircraft was the 91st 767-300ER ordered by the Japanese carrier, and with its completion the 767 became the second wide-body airliner to reach the thousand-unit milestone after the 747. The 1,000th aircraft also marked the last model produced on the original 767 assembly line. Beginning with the 1,001st aircraft, production moved to another area in the Everett factory which occupied about half of the previous floor space. The new assembly line made room for 787 production and aimed to boost manufacturing efficiency by over twenty percent.

At the inauguration of its new assembly line, the 767's order backlog numbered approximately 50, only enough for production to last until 2013. Despite the reduced backlog, Boeing officials expressed optimism that additional orders would be forthcoming. On February 24, 2011, the USAF announced its selection of the KC-767 Advanced Tanker, an upgraded variant of the KC-767, for its KC-X fleet renewal program. The selection followed two rounds of tanker competition between Boeing and Airbus parent EADS, and came eight years after the USAF's original 2003 announcement of its plan to lease KC-767s. The tanker order encompassed 179 aircraft and was expected to sustain 767 production past 2013.

In December 2011, FedEx Express announced a 767-300F order for 27 aircraft to replace its DC-10 freighters, citing the USAF tanker order and Boeing's decision to continue production as contributing factors. FedEx Express agreed to buy 19 more of the −300F variant in June 2012. In June 2015, FedEx said it was accelerating retirements of planes both to reflect demand and to modernize its fleet, recording charges of $276 million (~$366 million in 2025). On July 21, 2015, FedEx announced an order for 50 767-300F with options on another 50, the largest order for the type. With the announcement FedEx confirmed that it has firm orders for 106 of the freighters for delivery between 2018 and 2023. In February 2018, UPS announced an order for 4 more 767-300Fs to increase the total on order to 63.

With its successor, the Boeing New Midsize Airplane, that was planned for introduction in 2025 or later, and the 787 being much larger, Boeing could restart a passenger 767-300ER production to bridge the gap. A demand for 50 to 60 aircraft could have to be satisfied. Having to replace its 40 767s, United Airlines requested a price quote for other widebodies. In November 2017, Boeing CEO Dennis Muilenburg cited interest beyond military and freighter uses. However, in early 2018 Boeing Commercial Airplanes VP of marketing Randy Tinseth stated that the company did not intend to resume production of the passenger variant.

In its first quarter of 2018 earnings report, Boeing planned to increase its production from 2.5 to 3 monthly beginning in January 2020 due to increased demand in the cargo market, as FedEx had 56 on order, UPS had four, and an unidentified customer had three. In 2019, unit cost was US$217.9 million for a -300ER, and US$220.3 million for a -300F.

Production of the 767 was expected to cease by the end of 2027 due to more stringent emissions and noise limits that will go into effect in 2028. However, as of May 2024, the US Congress is considering giving Boeing a waiver to continue to produce the 767 freighter for an additional five years. If granted, these aircraft would be restricted to domestic use within the US only. Boeing is widely expected to begin production of 787 Freighter during that extension period.

=== Continued development ===
==== 767-X (partial double-deck) ====
After the debut of the first stretched 767s, Boeing sought to address airline requests for greater capacity by proposing larger models, including a partial double-deck version informally named the "Hunchback of Mukilteo" (from a town near Boeing's Everett factory) with a 757 body section mounted over the aft main fuselage. In 1986, Boeing proposed the 767-X, a revised model with extended wings and a wider cabin, but received little interest. The 767-X did not get enough interest from airlines to launch and the model was shelved in 1988 in favor of the Boeing 777.

==== 767-400ERX ====
In March 2000, Boeing was to launch the 259-seat 767-400ERX with an initial order for three from Kenya Airways with deliveries planned for 2004, as it was proposed to Lauda Air. Increased gross weight and a tailplane fuel tank would have boosted its range by 5,990 to 6,490 nautical miles (11,100 to 12,025 km), and GE could offer its 65,000–68,000 lbf (290–300 kN) CF6-80C2/G2. Rolls-Royce offered its 68,000–72,000 lbf (300–320 kN) Trent 600 for the 767-400ERX and the Boeing 747X.

Offered in July, the longer-range -400ERX would have a strengthened wing, fuselage and landing gear for a 15,000 lb (6.8 t) higher MTOW, up to 465,000 lb (210.92 t). Thrust would rise to 72,000 lbf (320 kN) for better takeoff performance, with the Trent 600 or the General Electric/Pratt & Whitney Engine Alliance GP7172, also offered on the 747X. Range would increase by 525 nmi (604 mi; 972 km) to 6,150 nmi (7,080 mi; 11,390 km), with an additional fuel tank of 2,145 US gal (8,120 L; 1,786 imp gal) in the horizontal tail. The 767-400ERX would offer the capacity of the Airbus A330-200 with 3% lower fuel burn and costs. Boeing cancelled the variant development in 2001. Kenya Airways then switched its order to the 777-200ER.

==== 767-XF (re-engine) ====
In October 2019, Boeing was reportedly studying a re-engined 767-XF for entry into service around 2025, based on the 767-400ER with an extended landing gear to accommodate larger General Electric GEnx turbofan engines. The cargo market is the main target, but a passenger version could be a cheaper alternative to the proposed New Midsize Airplane.

== Design ==
=== Overview ===
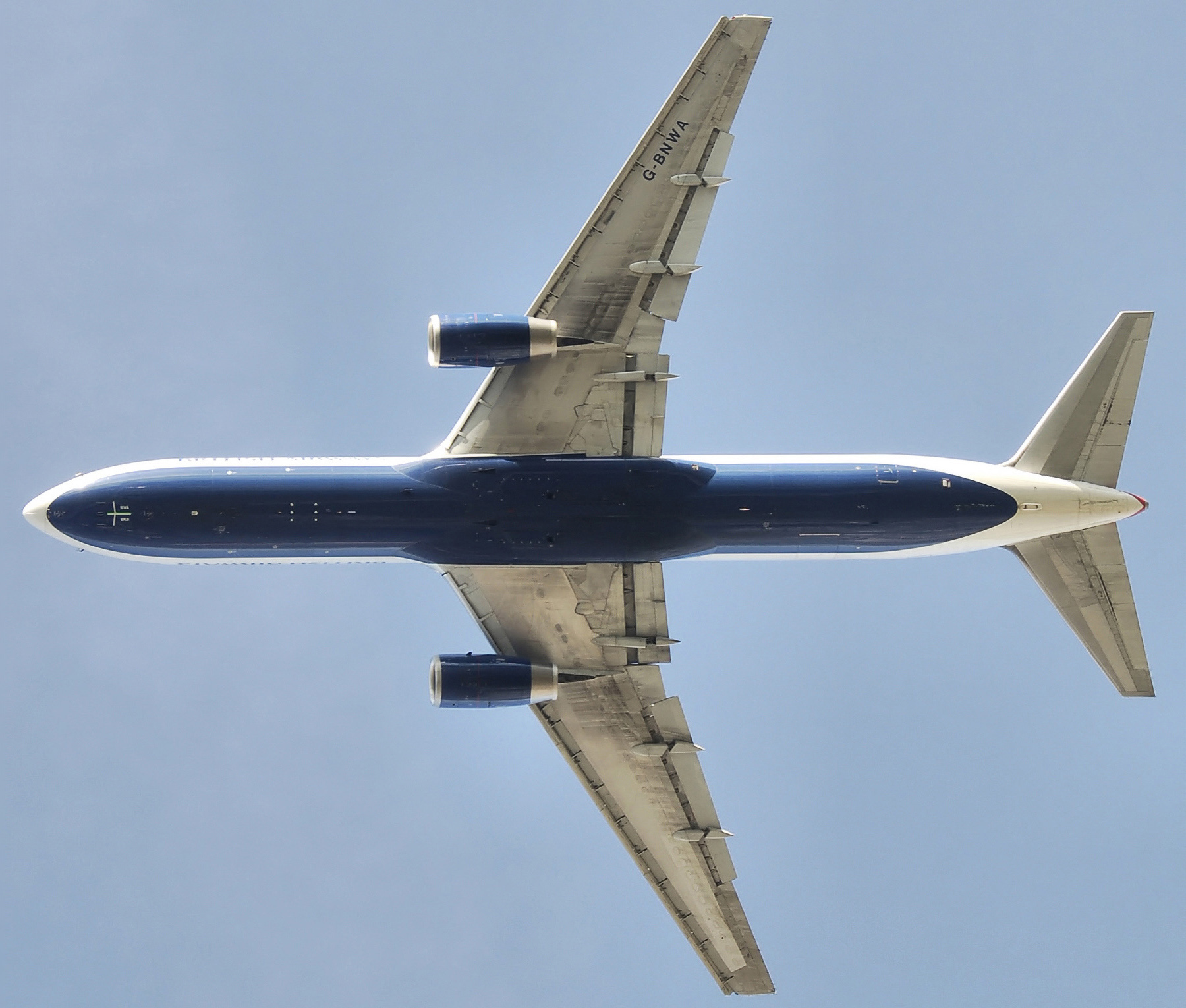
Planform view of a 767-300, showing its 156 ft 1 in (47.57 m) wide wing with a 3,050 ft^{2} (283.3 m^{2}) area and a 31.5° sweepback, for a 7.99:1 aspect ratio

The 767 is a low-wing cantilever monoplane with a conventional tail unit featuring a single fin and rudder. The wings are swept at 31.5 degrees and optimized for a cruising speed of Mach 0.8 (533 mph or 858 km/h). Each wing features a supercritical airfoil cross-section and is equipped with six-panel leading edge slats, single- and double-slotted flaps, inboard and outboard ailerons, and six spoilers. The airframe further incorporates Carbon-fiber-reinforced polymer composite material wing surfaces, Kevlar fairings and access panels, plus improved aluminum alloys, which together reduce overall weight by 1,900 pounds (860 kg) versus preceding aircraft.

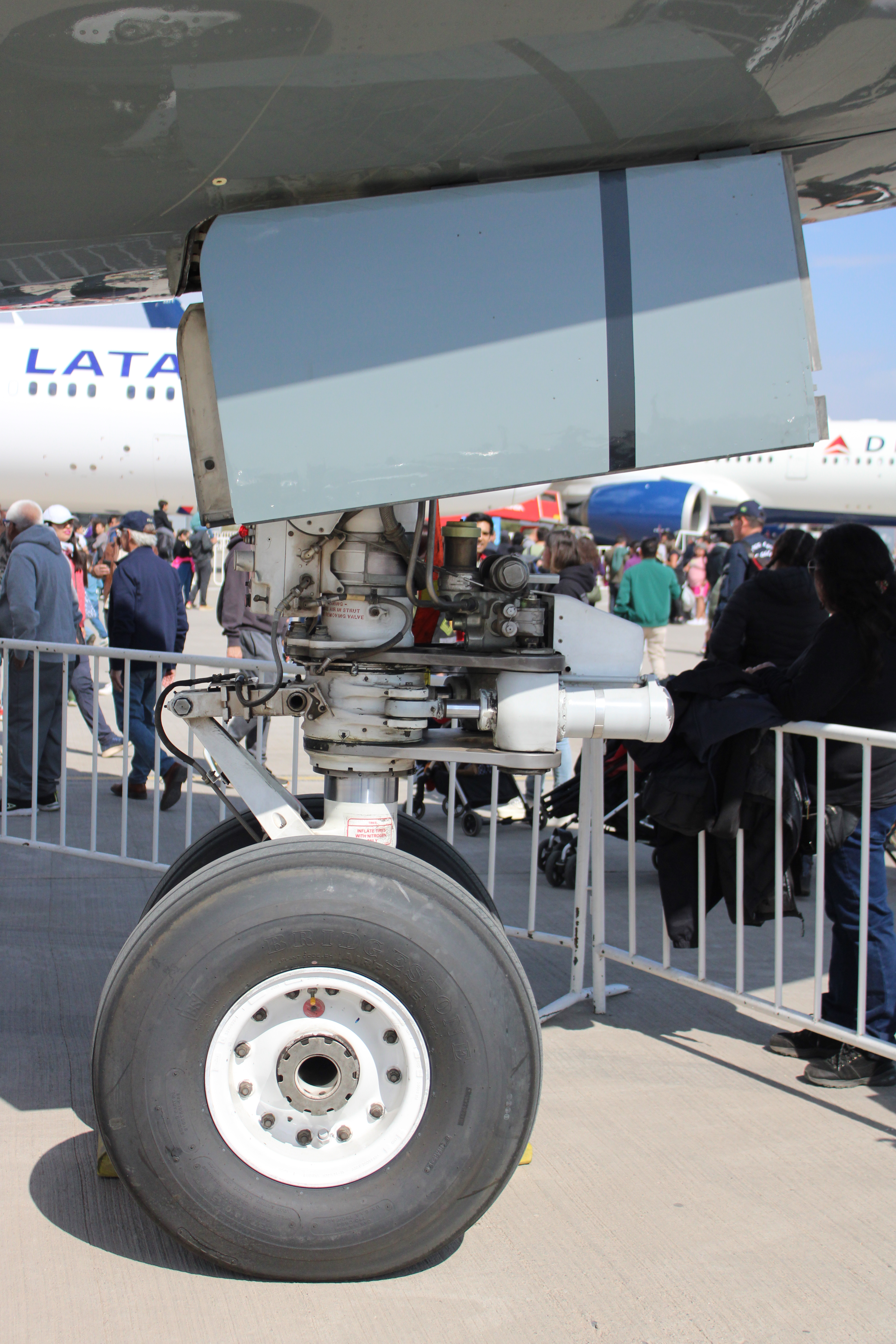
Front Landing gear of a 767-300ER

To distribute the aircraft's weight on the ground, the 767 has a retractable tricycle landing gear with four wheels on each main gear and two for the nose gear. The original wing and gear design accommodated the stretched 767-300 without major changes. The 767-400ER features a larger, more widely spaced main gear with 777 wheels, tires, and brakes. To prevent damage if the tail section contacts the runway surface during takeoff, 767-300 and 767-400ER models are fitted with a retractable tailskid.

All passenger Boeing 767 models have full-sized doors at the front and rear of the aircraft. Most -200 and -200ER models feature a single overwing exit, though an optional second overwing exit increases maximum capacity from 255 to 290. The 767-300 and 767-300ER typically have either two overwing exits or an additional full-sized mid-cabin door along with a single overwing exit. A higher-capacity configuration includes the full-sized mid-cabin door a smaller exit door aft the wing, raising the maximum capacity from 290 to 351. The 767-400ER is configured with the full-sized mid-cabin door a smaller exit door aft the wing. The 767-300F cargo model has a single exit door on the forward left side of the aircraft.

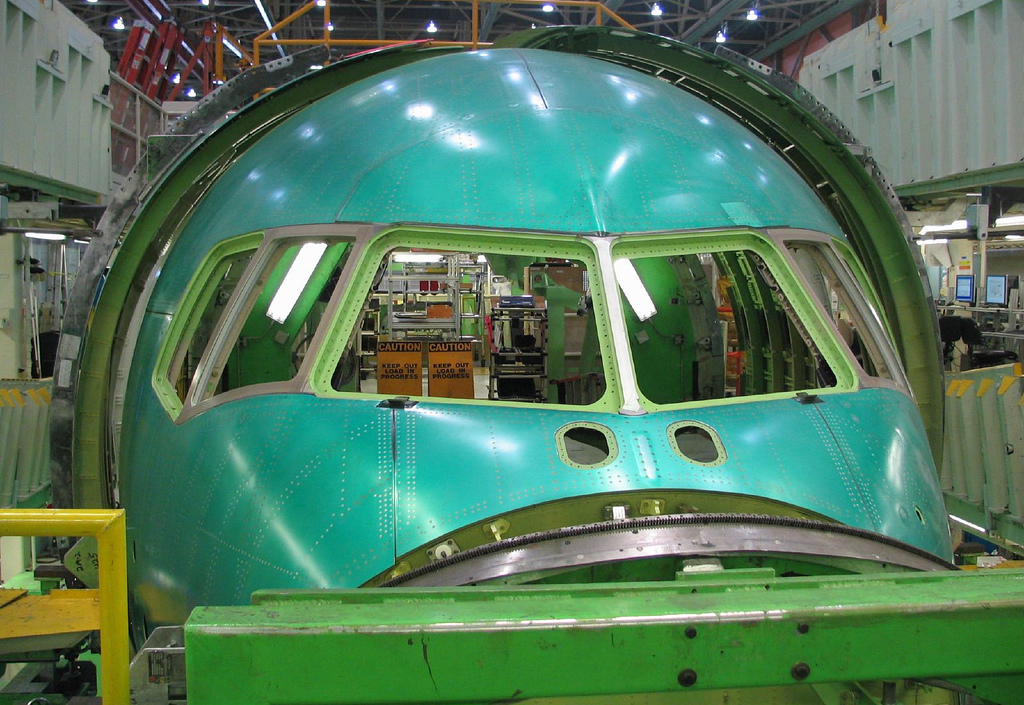
The 767 has the same forward-facing cockpit windows as the Boeing 757.

In addition to shared avionics and computer technology, the 767 uses the same auxiliary power unit, electric power systems, and hydraulic parts as the 757. A raised cockpit floor and the same forward cockpit windows result in similar pilot viewing angles. Related design and functionality allows 767 pilots to obtain a common type rating to operate the 757 and share the same seniority roster with pilots of either aircraft.

=== Flight systems ===
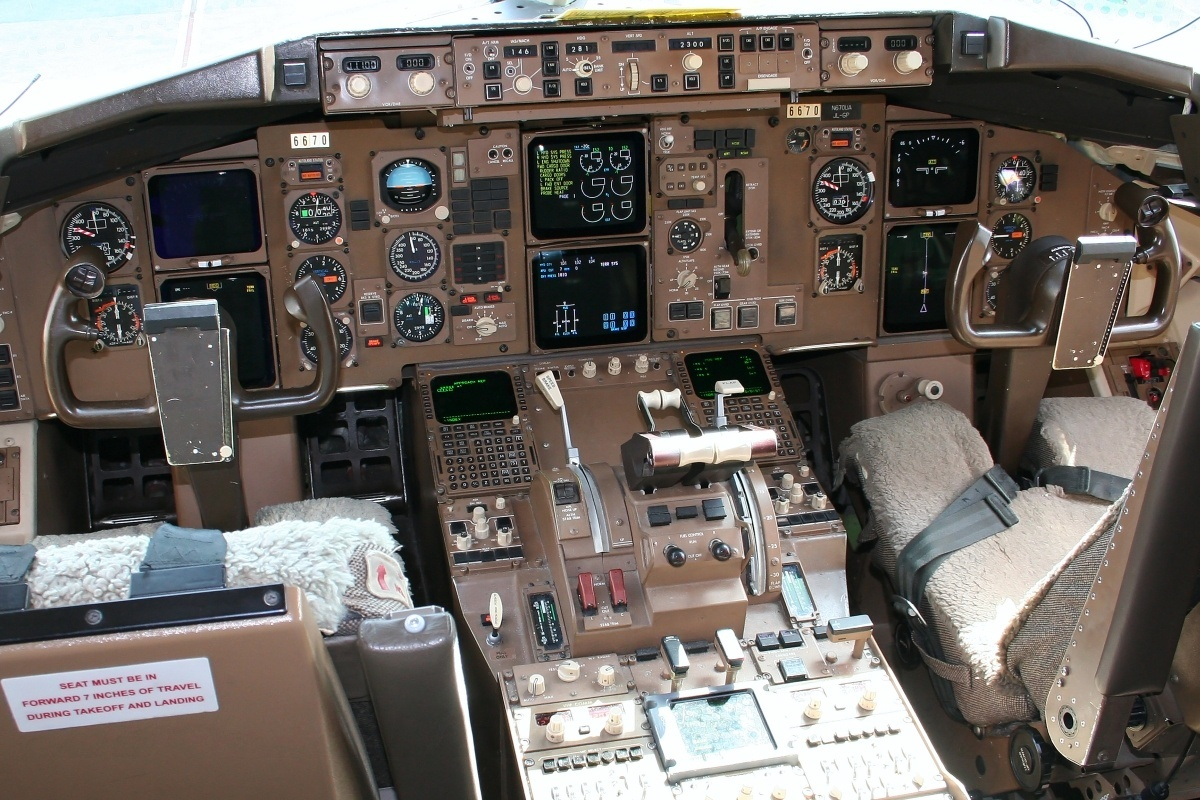
The early 767-300 flight deck with electronic flight instrument system (EFIS) and EICAS screens allowed two-crew operations

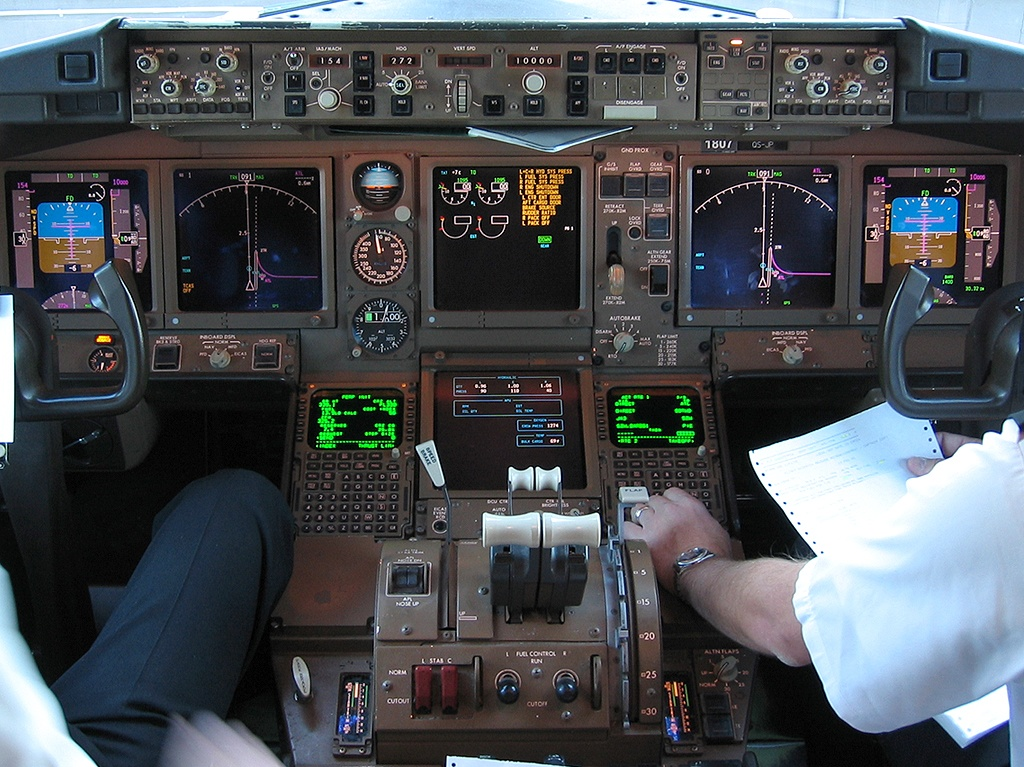
The 767-400 flight deck featured larger displays, earlier models could be upgraded with similar displays

The original Boeing 767 flight deck features a two-crew glass cockpit, the first of its kind on a Boeing airliner, developed jointly with the narrow-body 757. This design allows for a common pilot type rating between the two aircraft. The cockpit includes six Rockwell Collins CRT screens that display electronic flight instrument system (EFIS) and engine indication and crew alerting system (EICAS) information, eliminating the need for a flight engineer by enabling pilots to manage monitoring tasks. These CRT screens replace the traditional electromechanical instruments used in earlier aircraft. The aircraft's enhanced flight management system, an improvement over early Boeing 747 versions, automates navigation and other functions. Additionally, an automatic landing system supports CAT IIIb instrument landings in low-visibility conditions. In 1984, the 767 became the first aircraft to receive FAA certification for CAT IIIb landings, permitting operations with a minimum visibility of 980 feet (300 m). The 767-400ER further simplifies the cockpit layout with six Rockwell Collins LCD screens, designed for operational similarity with the 777 and 737NG. To maintain commonality, these LCD screens can be configured to present information in the same format as earlier 767 models. In 2012, Rockwell Collins introduced a 787-inspired cockpit upgrade for the 767, featuring three landscape-format LCD screens capable of displaying two windows each.

=== Interior ===
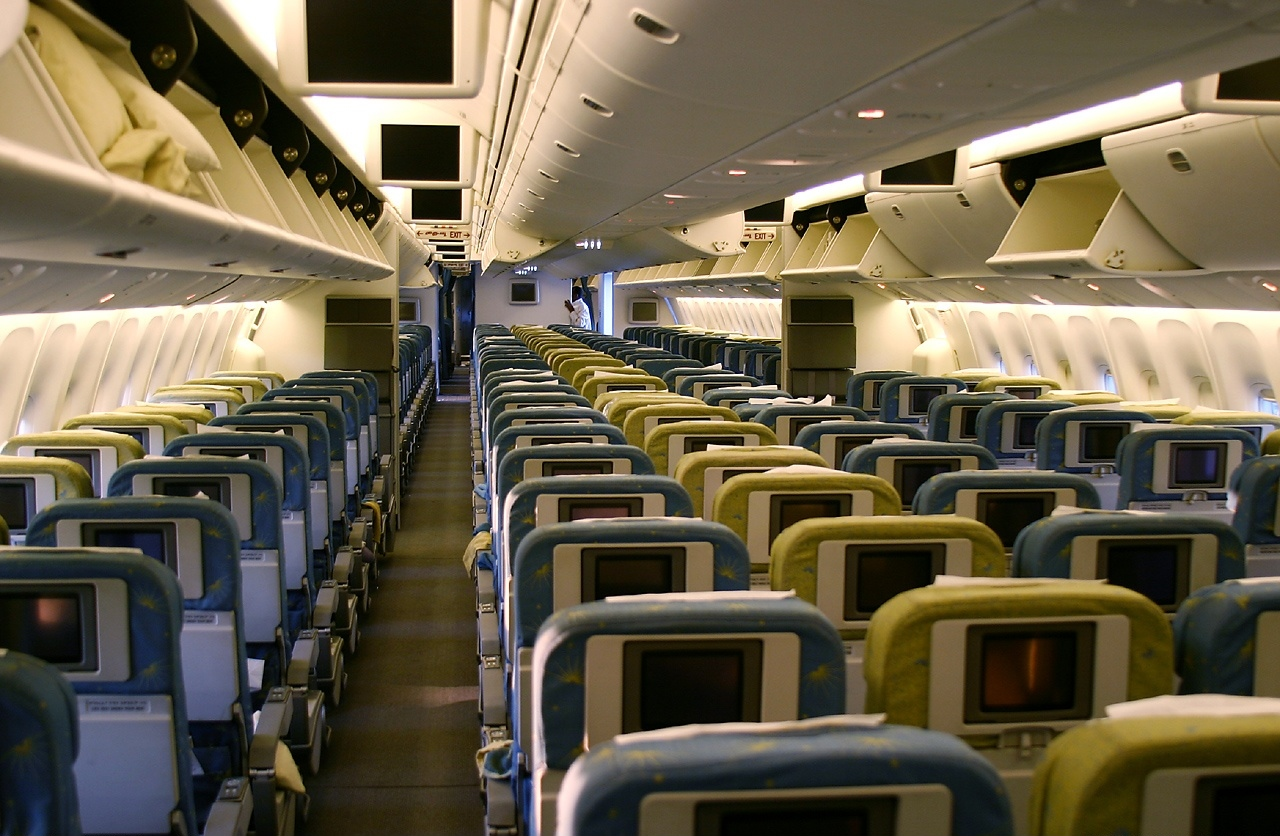
Economy class with two aisles and seven seats per row in 2–3–2 layout

The 767 features a twin-aisle cabin with a typical configuration of six abreast in business class and seven across in economy. The standard seven abreast, 2–3–2 economy class layout places approximately 87 percent of all seats at a window or aisle. As a result, the aircraft can be largely occupied before center seats need to be filled, and each passenger is no more than one seat from the aisle. It is possible to configure the aircraft with extra seats for up to an eight abreast configuration, but this is less common.

The 767 interior introduced larger overhead bins and more lavatories per passenger than previous aircraft. The bins are wider to accommodate garment bags without folding, and strengthened for heavier carry-on items. A single, large galley is installed near the aft doors, allowing for more efficient meal service and simpler ground resupply. Passenger and service doors are an overhead plug type, which retract upwards, and commonly used doors can be equipped with an electric-assist system.

In 2000, a 777-style interior, known as the Boeing Signature Interior, debuted on the 767-400ER. Subsequently, adopted for all new-build 767s, the Signature Interior features even larger overhead bins, indirect lighting, and sculpted, curved panels. The 767-400ER also received larger windows derived from the 777. Older 767s can be retrofitted with the Signature Interior. Some operators have adopted a simpler modification known as the Enhanced Interior, featuring curved ceiling panels and indirect lighting with minimal modification of cabin architecture, as well as aftermarket modifications such as the NuLook 767 package by Heath Tecna.

== Operational history ==
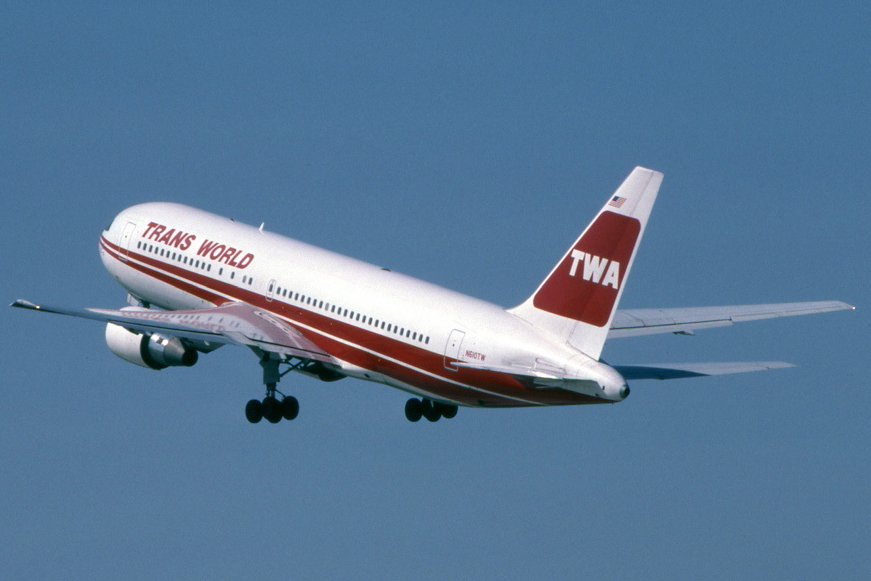
TWA began operating the first 767-200 ETOPS flights in May 1985.

In its first year, the 767 logged a 96.1 percent dispatch rate, which exceeded the industry average for all-new aircraft. Operators reported generally favorable ratings for the twinjet's sound levels, interior comfort, and economic performance. Resolved issues were minor and included the recalibration of a leading edge sensor to prevent false readings, the replacement of an evacuation slide latch, and the repair of a tailplane pivot to match production specifications.

Seeking to capitalize on its new wide-body's potential for growth, Boeing offered an extended-range model, the 767-200ER, in its first year of service. Ethiopian Airlines placed the first order for the type in December 1982. Featuring increased gross weight and greater fuel capacity, the extended-range model could carry heavier payloads at distances up to 6,385 nautical miles (11,825 km; 7,348 mi), and was targeted at overseas customers. The 767-200ER entered service with El Al Airline on March 27, 1984. The type was mainly ordered by international airlines operating medium-traffic, long-distance flights. In May 1984, an Ethiopian Airlines 767-200ER set a non-stop record for a commercial twinjet of 12,082 km (6,524 nmi; 7,507 mi) from Washington, D.C. to Addis Ababa.

In the mid-1980s, the 767 and its European rivals, the Airbus A300 and A310, spearheaded the growth of twinjet flights across the northern Atlantic under extended-range twin-engine operational performance standards (ETOPS) regulations, the FAA's safety rules governing transoceanic flights by aircraft with two engines. In 1976, the A300 was the first twinjet to secure permission to fly 90 minutes away from diversion airports, up from 60 minutes. In May 1985, the FAA granted its first approval for 120-minute ETOPS flights to the 767, on an individual airline basis starting with TWA, provided that the operator met flight safety criteria. This allowed the aircraft to fly overseas routes at up to two hours' distance from land. The 767 burned 7,000 lb (3.2 t) less fuel per hour than a Lockheed L-1011 TriStar on the route between Boston and Paris, a huge savings. The Airbus A310 secured approval for 120-minute ETOPS flights one month later in June. The larger safety margins were permitted because of the improved reliability demonstrated by twinjets and their turbofan engines. The FAA lengthened the ETOPS time to 180 minutes for CF6-powered 767s in 1989, making the type the first to be certified under the longer duration, and all available engines received approval by 1993. Regulatory approval spurred the expansion of transoceanic flights with twinjet aircraft and boosted the sales of both the 767 and its rivals.

== Variants ==
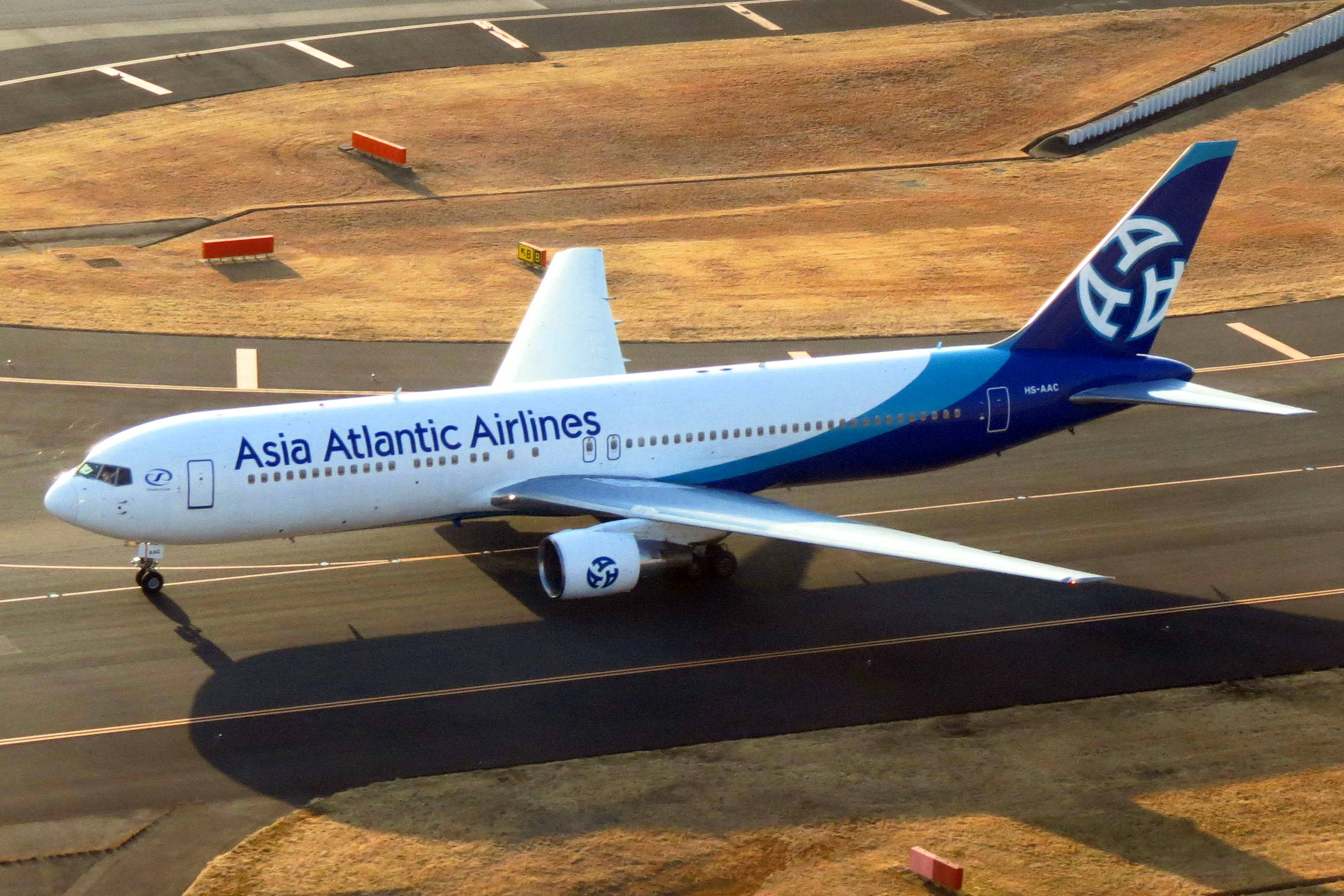
The 767 is a widebody with a low wing, twin underwing turbofans, and a conventional tail.

The 767 has been produced in three fuselage lengths. These debuted in progressively larger form as the 767-200, 767-300, and 767-400ER. Longer-range variants include the 767-200ER and 767-300ER, while cargo models include the 767-300F, a production freighter, and conversions of passenger 767-200 and 767-300 models.

When referring to different variants, Boeing and airlines often collapse the model number (767) and the variant designator, e.g. –200 or –300, into a truncated form, e.g. "762" or "763". Subsequent to the capacity number, designations may append the range identifier, though -200ER and -300ER are company marketing designations and not certificated as such. The International Civil Aviation Organization (ICAO) aircraft type designator system uses a similar numbering scheme, but adds a preceding manufacturer letter; all variants based on the 767-200 and 767-300 are classified under the codes "B762" and "B763"; the 767-400ER receives the designation of "B764".

=== 767-200 ===
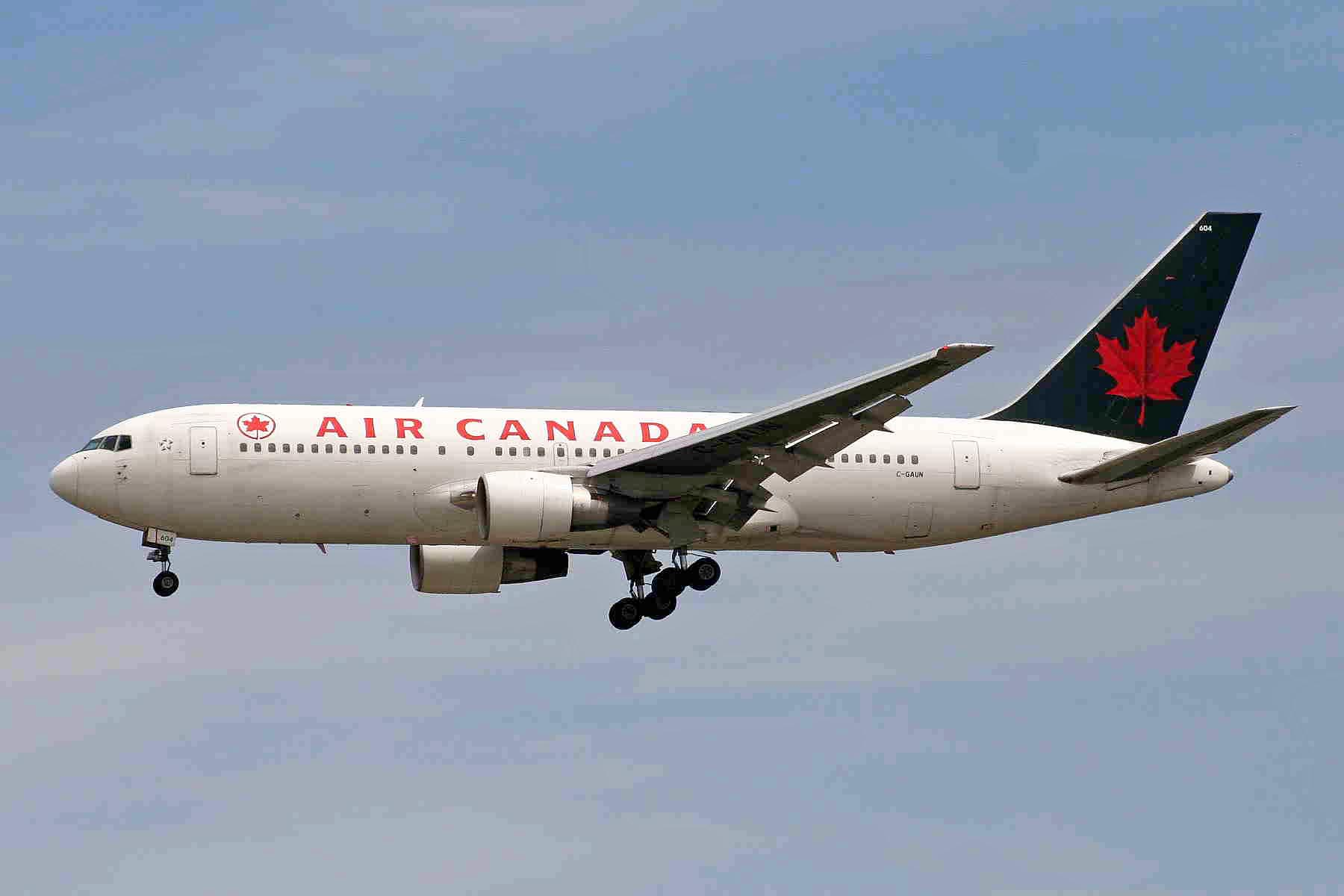
The 767-200 is the shortest variant of the 767, at 159 feet (48 m)

The 767-200 was the original model and entered service with United Airlines in 1982. The type has been used primarily by mainline U.S. carriers for domestic routes between major hub centers such as Los Angeles to Washington. The 767-200 was the first aircraft to be used on transatlantic ETOPS flights, beginning with TWA on February 1, 1985, under 90-minute diversion rules. Deliveries for the variant totaled 128 aircraft. There were 52 examples of the model in commercial service as of 2018, almost entirely as freighter conversions. The type's competitors included the Airbus A300 and A310.

The 767-200 was produced until 1987 when production switched to the extended-range 767-200ER. Some early 767-200s were subsequently upgraded to extended-range specification. In 1998, Boeing began offering 767-200 conversions to 767-200SF (Special Freighter) specification for cargo use, and Israel Aerospace Industries has been licensed to perform cargo conversions since 2005. The conversion process entails the installation of a side cargo door, strengthened main deck floor, and added freight monitoring and safety equipment. The 767-200SF was positioned as a replacement for Douglas DC-8 freighters.

=== 767-2C ===
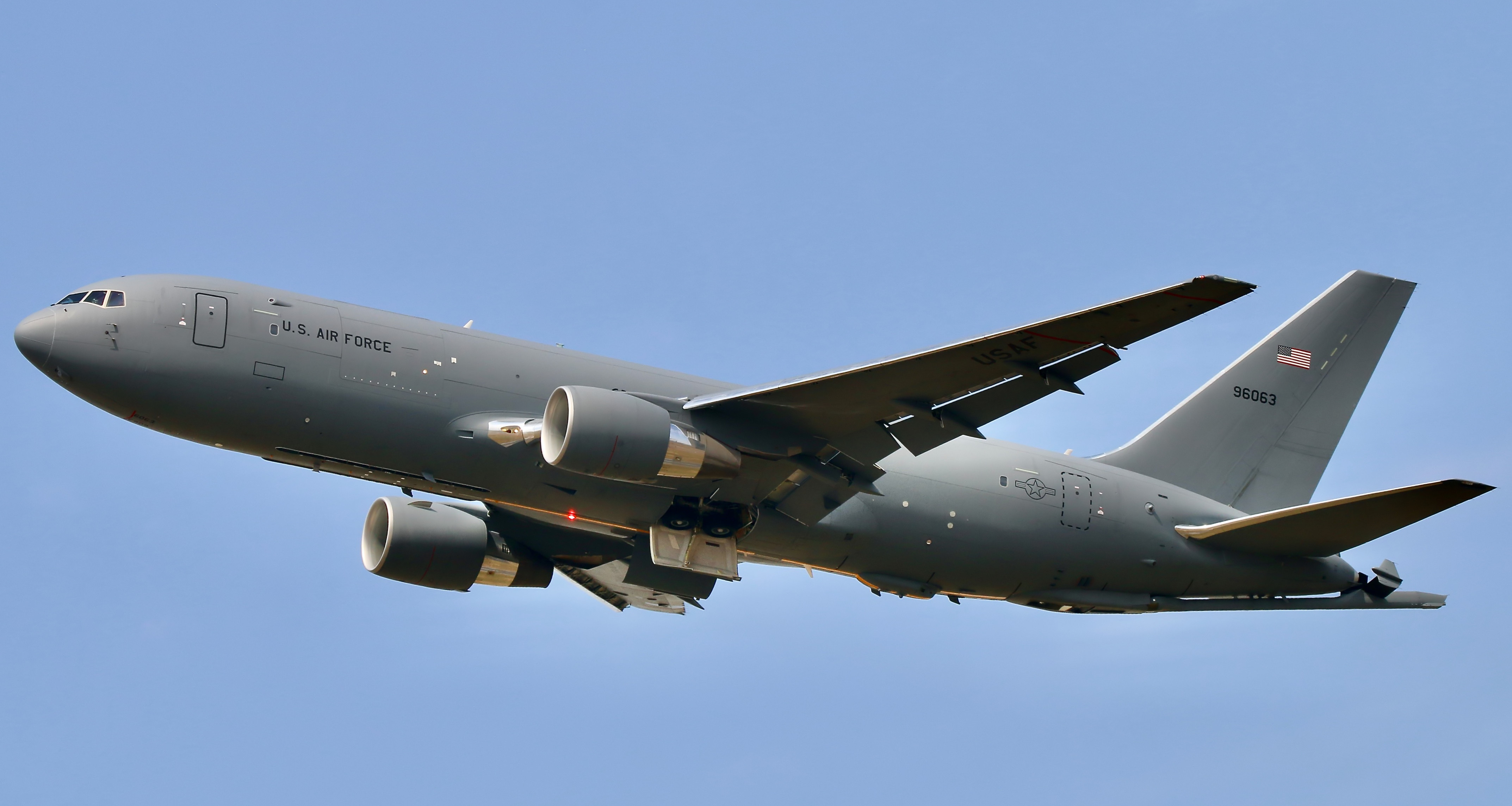
A Boeing KC-46A belonging to the United States Air Force

A commercial freighter version of the Boeing 767-200 with wings from the -300 series and an updated flightdeck was first flown on December 29, 2014. A military tanker variant of the Boeing 767-2C is developed for the USAF as the KC-46. Boeing is building two aircraft as commercial freighters which will be used to obtain Federal Aviation Administration certification, a further two Boeing 767-2Cs will be modified as military tankers. As of 2014, Boeing does not have customers for the freighter.

=== 767-200ER ===
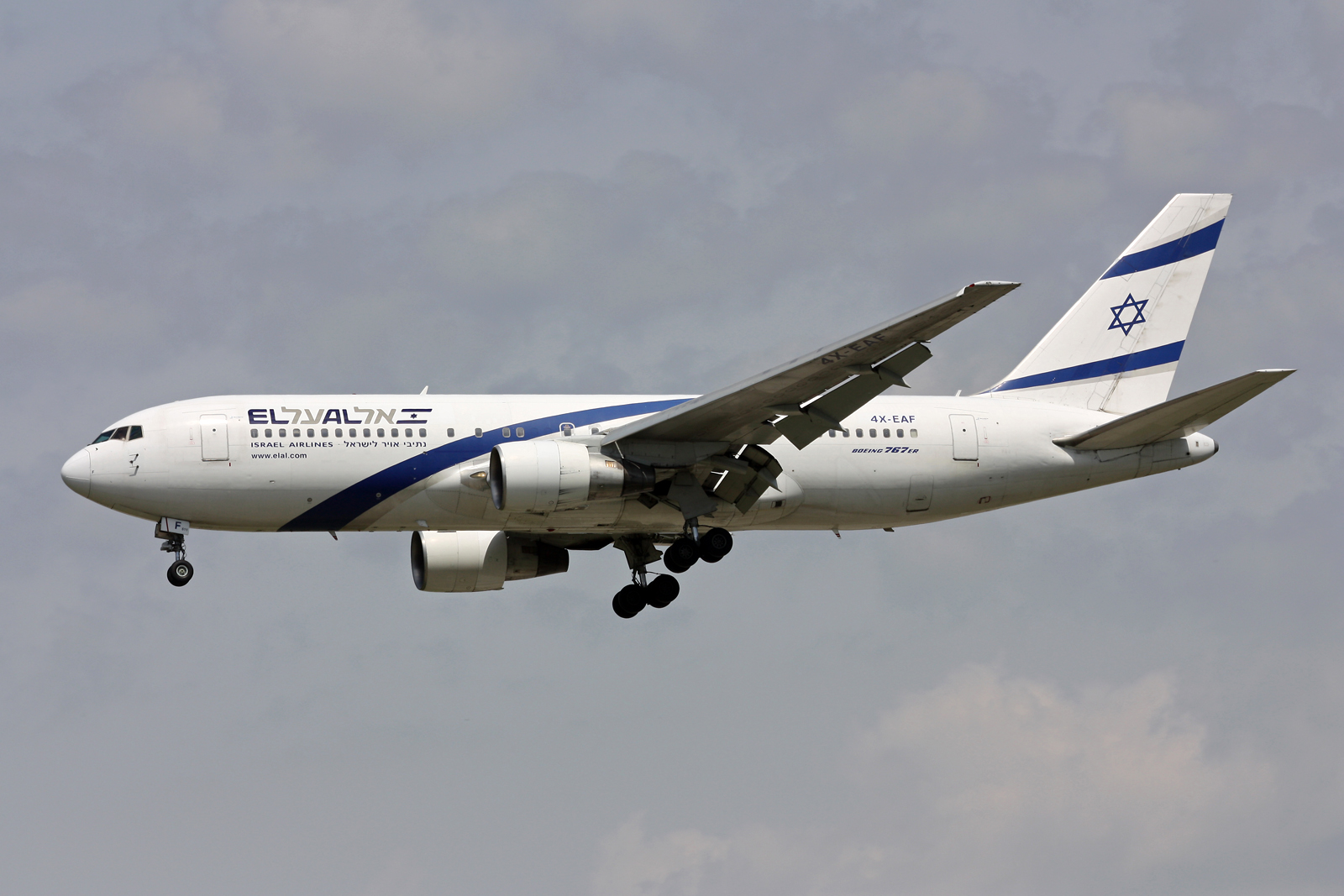
A 767-200ER of its launch customer, El Al. The -200ER is externally similar to the -200.

The 767-200ER was the first extended-range model and entered service with El Al in 1984. The type's increased range is due to extra fuel capacity and higher maximum takeoff weight (MTOW) of up to 395,000 lb (179,000 kg). The additional fuel capacity is accomplished by using the center tank's dry dock to carry fuel. The non-ER variant's center tank is what is called cheek tanks; two interconnected halves in each wing root with a dry dock in between. The center tank is also used on the -300ER and -400ER variants.

This version was originally offered with the same engines as the 767-200, while more powerful Pratt & Whitney PW4000 and General Electric CF6 engines later became available. The 767-200ER was the first 767 to complete a non-stop transatlantic journey, and broke the flying distance record for a twinjet airliner on April 17, 1988, with an Air Mauritius flight from Halifax, Nova Scotia to Port Louis, Mauritius, covering 8,727 nmi (16,200 km; 10,000 mi). The 767-200ER has been acquired by international operators seeking smaller wide-body aircraft for long-haul routes such as New York to Beijing. Deliveries of the type totaled 121 with no unfilled orders. As of 2018, 21 examples of passenger and freighter conversion versions were in airline service. The type's main competitors of the time included the Airbus A300-600R and the A310-300.

=== 767-300 ===
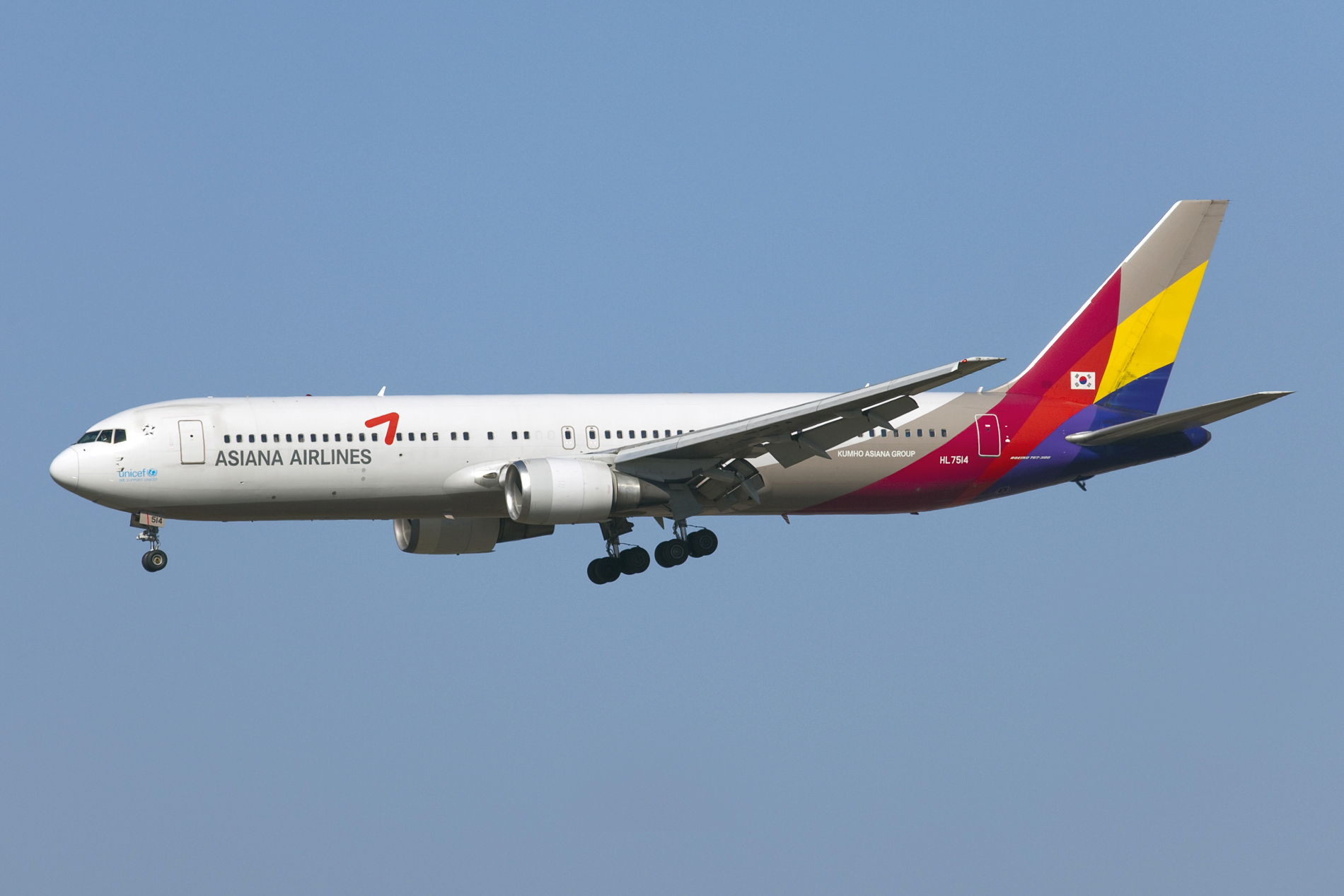
Asiana Airlines Boeing 767-300 in 2012

The 767-300, the first stretched version of the aircraft, entered service with Japan Airlines in 1986. The type features a 21.1-foot (6.43 m) fuselage extension over the 767-200, achieved by additional sections inserted before and after the wings, for an overall length of 180.25 ft (54.9 m). Reflecting the growth potential built into the original 767 design, the wings, engines, and most systems were largely unchanged on the 767-300. An optional mid-cabin exit door is positioned ahead of the wings on the left, while more powerful Pratt & Whitney PW4000 and Rolls-Royce RB211 engines later became available. The 767-300's increased capacity has been used on high-density routes within Asia and Europe. The 767-300 was produced from 1986 until 2000. Deliveries for the type totaled 104 aircraft with no unfilled orders remaining. The type's main competitor was the Airbus A300.

=== 767-300ER ===
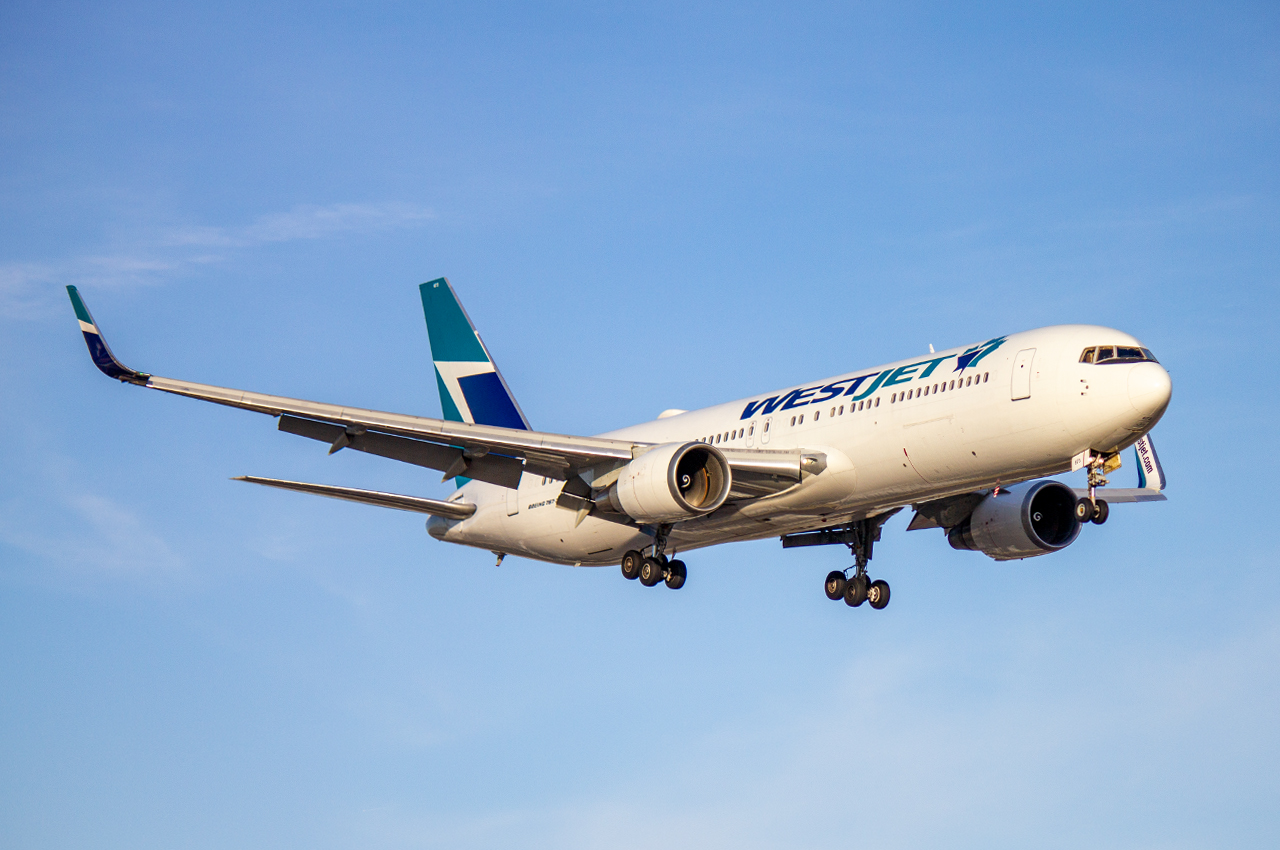
A WestJet 767-300ER in 2019, externally identical to 767-300. This example was retrofitted with winglets.

The 767-300ER, the extended-range version of the 767-300, entered service with American Airlines in 1988. The type's increased range was made possible by greater fuel tankage and a higher MTOW of 407,000 lb (185,000 kg). Design improvements allowed the available MTOW to increase to 412,000 lb (187,000 kg) by 1993. Power is provided by Pratt & Whitney PW4000, General Electric CF6, or Rolls-Royce RB211 engines. The 767-300ER comes in three exit configurations: the baseline configuration has four main cabin doors and four over-wing window exits, the second configuration has six main cabin doors and two over-wing window exits; and the third configuration has six main cabin doors, as well as two smaller doors that are located behind the wings. Typical routes for the type include New York to Frankfurt.

The combination of increased capacity and range for the -300ER has been particularly attractive to both new and existing 767 operators. It is the most successful 767 version, with more orders placed than all other variants combined. As of 2017, 767-300ER deliveries stand at 583 with no unfilled orders. There were 376 examples in service as of 2018. The type's main competitor is the Airbus A330-200. At its 1990s peak, a new 767-300ER was valued at $85 million, dipping to around $12 million in 2018 for a 1996 build.

=== 767-300F ===
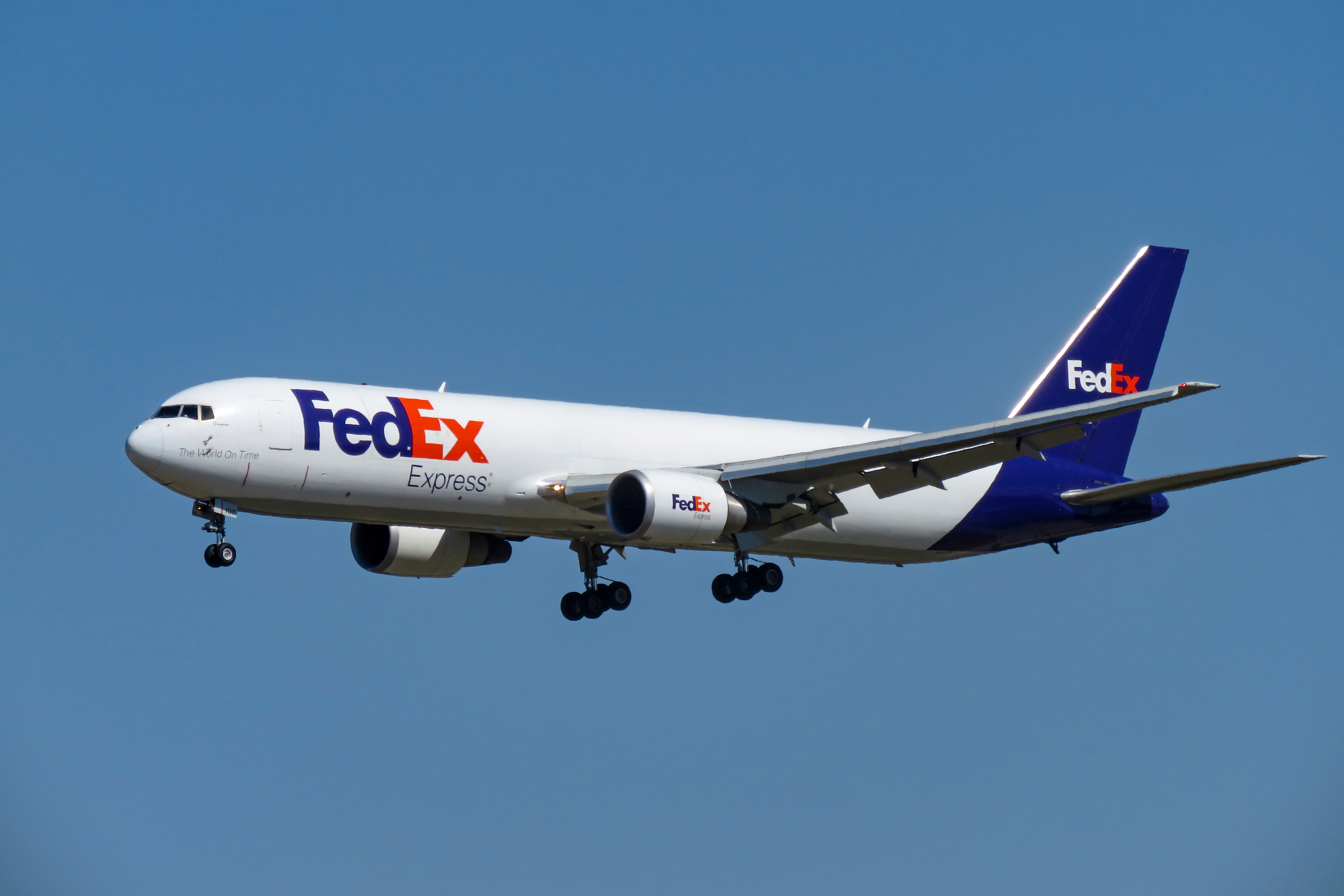
A FedEx Express 767-300F in 2019

The 767-300F, the production freighter version of the 767-300ER, entered service with UPS Airlines in 1995. The 767-300F can hold up to 24 standard 88-by-125-inch (220 by 320 cm) pallets on its main deck and up to 30 LD2 unit load devices on the lower deck, with a total cargo volume of 15,469 cubic feet (438 m^{3}). The freighter has a main deck cargo door and crew exit, while the lower deck features two starboard-side cargo doors and one port-side cargo door. A general market version with onboard freight-handling systems, refrigeration capability, and crew facilities was delivered to Asiana Airlines on August 23, 1996. As of 2019, 767-300F deliveries stand at 161 with 61 unfilled orders. Airlines operated 222 examples of the freighter variant and freighter conversions in 2018.

=== 767-400ER ===
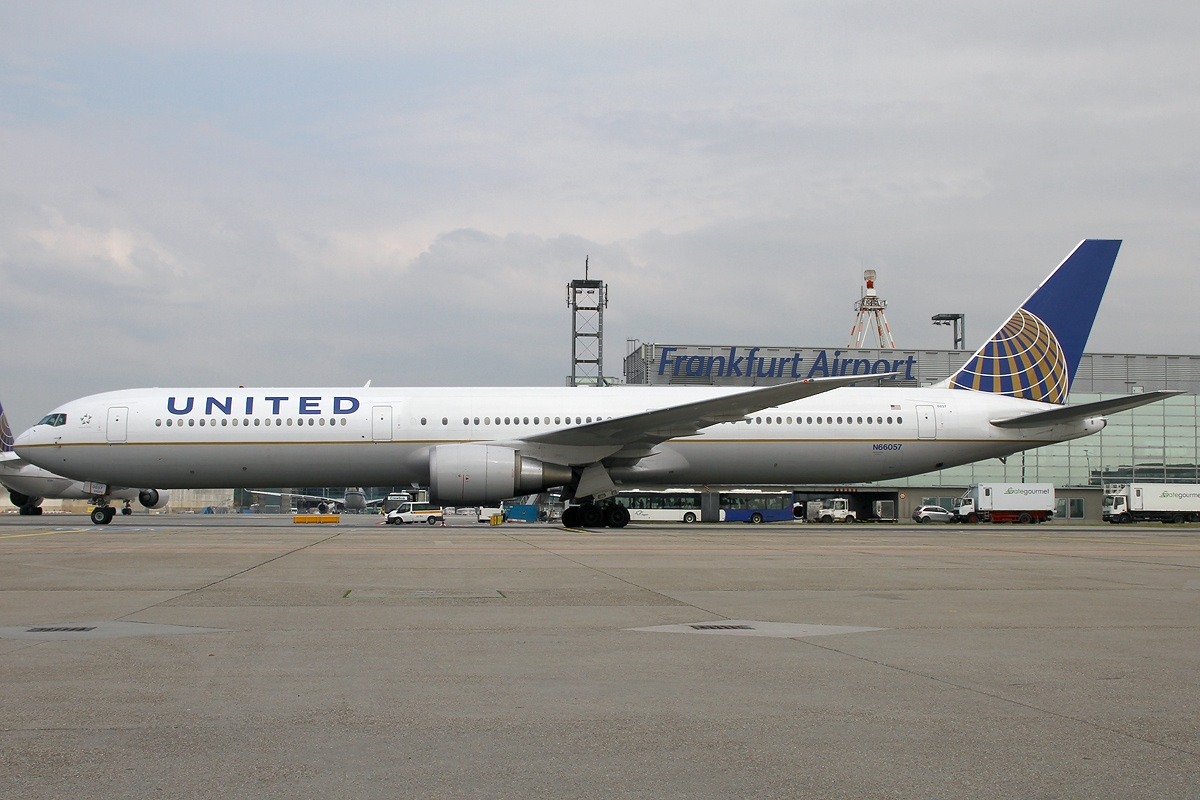
A 767-400ER of United Airlines in 2011. This variant is 205.11 feet (62.52 m) long.

The 767-400ER is the first Boeing wide-body jet resulting from two fuselage stretches. It entered service with Continental Airlines in 2000. The type features a 21.1-foot (6.4 m) stretch over the 767-300, for a total length of 205.11 feet (62.52 m). The wingspan is also increased by 14.3 feet (4.4 m) through the addition of raked wingtips. The exit configuration uses six main cabin doors and two smaller exit doors behind the wings, similar to certain 767-300ERs. Other differences include an updated cockpit, redesigned landing gear, and 777-style Signature Interior. Power is provided by uprated General Electric CF6 engines.

The FAA granted approval for the 767-400ER to operate 180-minute ETOPS flights before it entered service. Because its fuel capacity was not increased over preceding models, the 767-400ER has a range of 5,625 nautical miles (10,418 km; 6,473 mi), less than previous extended-range 767s.

Unlike the -200 and -300 variants, the -400 variant is only made in the Extended Range configuration. A longer-range 767-400ERX was offered in July 2000 before being cancelled a year later, leaving the 767-400ER as the sole version of the largest 767. Boeing dropped the 767-400ER and the -200ER from its pricing list in 2014.

A total of 37 767-400ERs were delivered to two customers: Continental Airlines (merged with United Airlines as of 2010) and Delta Air Lines. All 37 examples of the -400ER were in service in July 2018. One additional example was produced as a military testbed for the cancelled E-10, and later sold to Bahrain Royal Flight as a VIP transport. The type's closest competitor is the Airbus A330-200.

=== Converted freighters ===
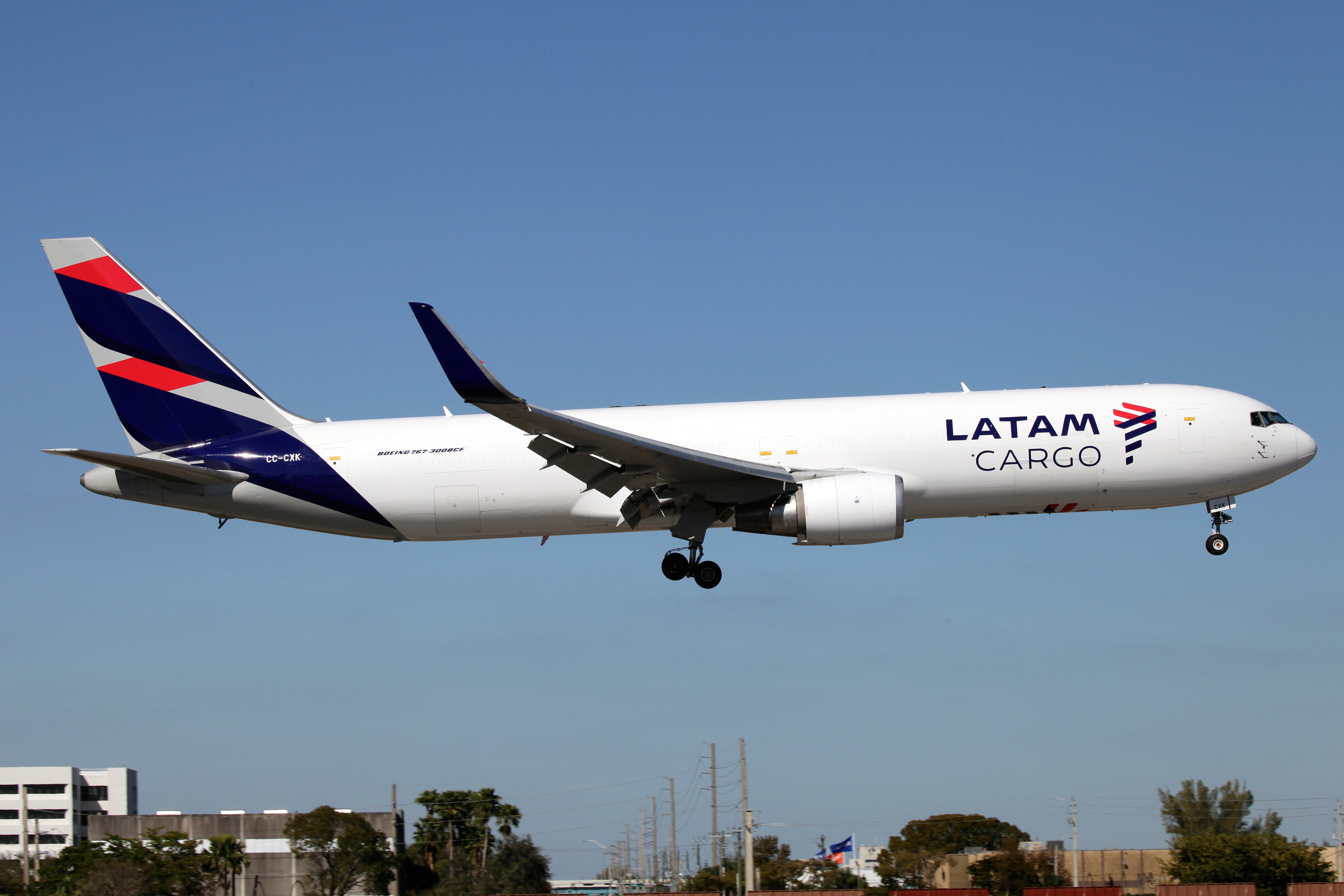
LATAM Cargo Chile 767-300BCF

In June 2008, All Nippon Airways took delivery of the first 767-300BCF (Boeing Converted Freighter), a modified passenger-to-freighter model. The conversion work was performed in Singapore by ST Aerospace Services, the first supplier to offer a 767-300BCF program, and involved the addition of a main deck cargo door, strengthened main deck floor, and additional freight monitoring and safety equipment. As of February 2025, 100 767s had been converted under the Boeing Converted Freighter program.

In addition, Israel Aerospace Industries offers passenger-to-freighter conversion programs named the 767-200BDSF and 767-300BDSF (BEDEK Special Freighter). As of February 2022, IAI has converted 100 Boeing 767-300ERs into 767-300BDSFs.

=== Military and government ===
Versions of the 767 serve in a number of military and government applications, with responsibilities ranging from airborne surveillance and refueling to cargo and VIP transport. Several military 767s have been derived from the 767-200ER, the longest-range version of the aircraft.

- Airborne Surveillance Testbed – the Airborne Optical Adjunct (AOA) was modified from the prototype 767-200 for a United States Army program, under a contract signed with the Strategic Air Command in July 1984. Intended to evaluate the feasibility of using airborne optical sensors to detect and track hostile intercontinental ballistic missiles, the modified aircraft first flew on August 21, 1987. Alterations included a large "cupola" or hump on the top of the aircraft from above the cockpit to just behind the trailing edge of the wings, and a pair of ventral fins below the rear fuselage. Inside the cupola was a suite of infrared seekers used for tracking theater ballistic missile launches. The aircraft was later renamed as the Airborne Surveillance Testbed (AST). Following the end of the AST program in 2002, the aircraft was retired for scrapping.

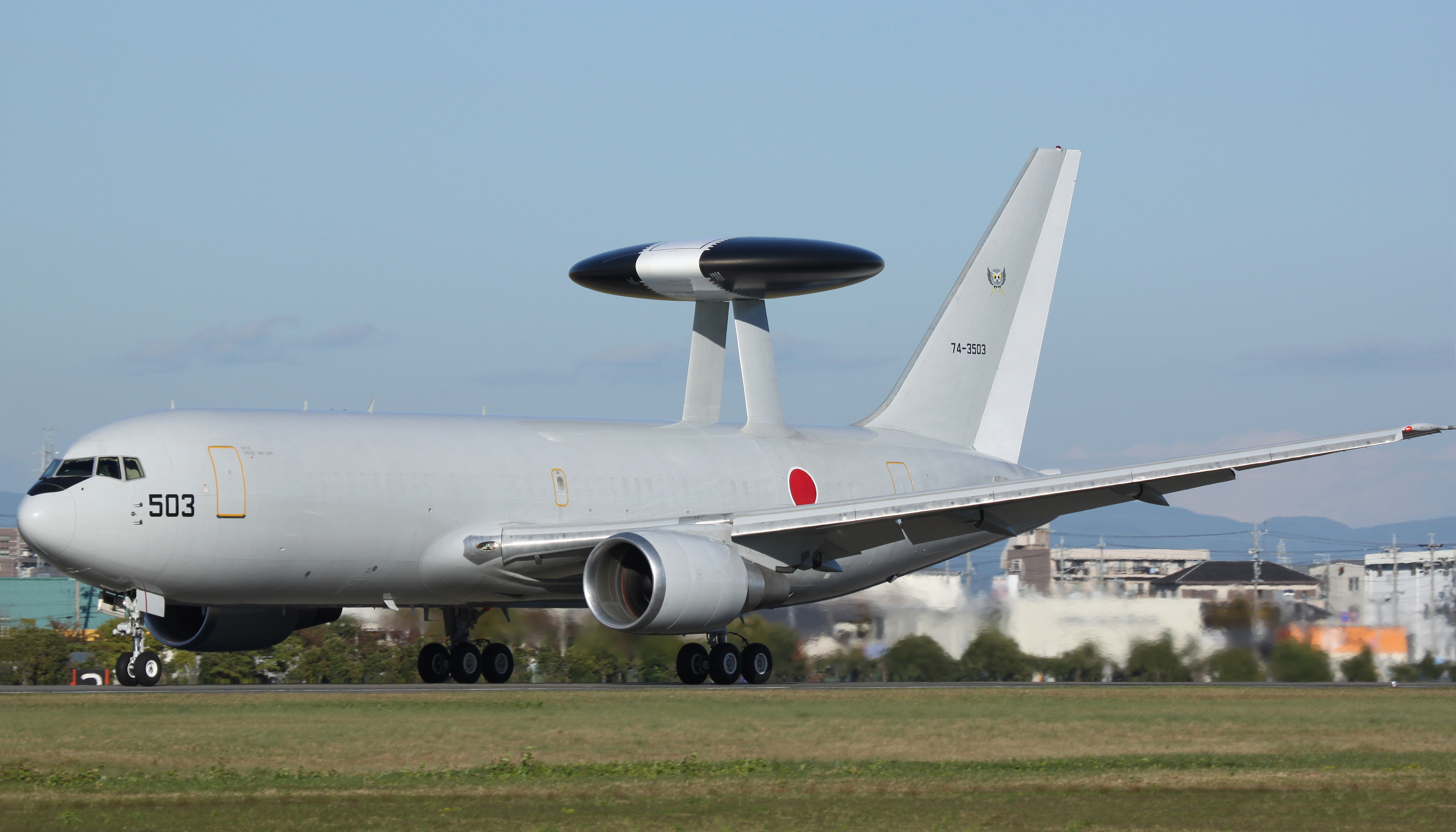
Japan Self-Defense Forces E-767 AWACS

- E-767 – the Airborne Early Warning and Control (AWACS) platform for the Japan Self-Defense Forces; it is essentially the Boeing E-3 Sentry mission package on a 767-200ER platform. E-767 modifications, completed on 767-200ERs flown from the Everett factory to Boeing Integrated Defense Systems in Wichita, Kansas, include strengthening to accommodate a dorsal surveillance radar system, engine nacelle alterations, as well as electrical and interior changes. Japan operates four E-767s. The first E-767s were delivered in March 1998.

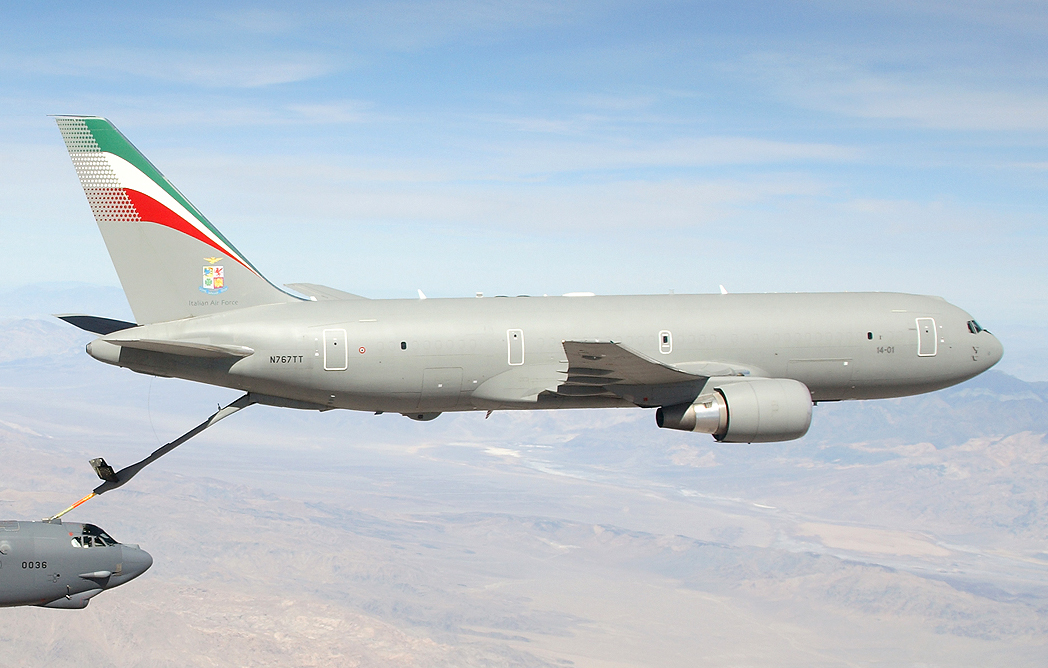
An Italian Air Force KC-767A tanker

- KC-767 Tanker Transport – the 767-200ER-based aerial refueling platform operated by the Italian Air Force (Aeronautica Militare), and the Japan Self-Defense Forces. Modifications conducted by Boeing Integrated Defense Systems include the addition of a fly-by-wire refueling boom, strengthened flaps, and optional auxiliary fuel tanks, as well as structural reinforcement and modified avionics. The four KC-767Js ordered by Japan have been delivered. The Aeronautica Militare received the first of its four KC-767As in January 2011.
- KC-767 Advanced Tanker – the 767-200ER-based aerial tanker developed for the USAF KC-X tanker competition. It is an updated version of the KC-767, originally selected as the USAF's new tanker aircraft in 2003, designated KC-767A, and then dropped amid conflict of interest allegations. The KC-767 Advanced Tanker is derived from studies for a longer-range cargo version of the 767-200ER, and features a fly-by-wire refueling boom, a remote vision refueling system, and a 767-400ER-based flight deck with LCD screens and head-up displays.
- KC-46 Pegasus – a 767-based tanker, not derived from the KC-767, awarded as part of the KC-X contract for the USAF.
- Tanker conversions – the 767 MMTT or Multi-Mission Tanker Transport is a 767-200ER-based aircraft operated by the Colombian Air Force (Fuerza Aérea Colombiana) and modified by Israel Aerospace Industries. In 2013, the Brazilian Air Force ordered two 767-300ER tanker conversions from IAI for its KC-X2 program.
- E-10 MC2A – the Northrop Grumman E-10 was to be a 767-400ER-based replacement for the USAF's 707-based E-3 Sentry AWACS, Northrop Grumman E-8 Joint STARS, and RC-135 SIGINT aircraft. The E-10 would have included an all-new AWACS system, with a powerful active electronically scanned array (AESA) that was also capable of jamming enemy aircraft or missiles. One 767-400ER aircraft was built as a testbed for systems integration, but the program was terminated in January 2009 and the prototype was later sold to Bahrain as a VIP transport.

=== Comparison ===
Below is a list of major differences between the 767 variants.

Variant	767-200	767-200ER	767-300	767-300ER/F	767-400ER
Seating capacity	255		290		409
Cargo	3,070 cu ft (86.9 m^{3})		4,030 cu ft (114.1 m^{3}) (Note: -300F: 15,469 cu ft (438 m^{3}), 24 88×108 in pallets)		4,905 cu ft (138.9 m^{3})
ULD	22 LD2s		30 LD2s		38 LD2s
Length	159 ft 2 in (48.51 m)		180 ft 3 in (54.94 m)		201 ft 4 in (61.37 m)
Wingspan	156 ft 1 in (47.57 m)				170 ft 4 in (51.92 m)
Wing	3,050 sq ft (283.3 m^{2}), 31.5° sweepback				3,130 sq ft^{2} (290.7 m^{2})
MTOW	315,000 lb (142.9 t)	395,000 lb (179.2 t)	350,000 lb (158.8 t)	412,000 lb (186.9 t)	450,000 lb (204.1 t)
Max. payload	73,350 lb (33.3 t)	78,390 lb (35.6 t)	88,250 lb (40 t)	96,560 lb (43.8 t) -300F: 119,000 lb (54 t)	101,000 lb (45.8 t)
OEW	176,650 lb (80.1 t)	181,610 lb (82.4 t)	189,750 lb (86.1 t)	198,440 lb (90 t) (Note: -300F: 190,000 lb (86.1 t))	229,000 lb (103.9 t)
Range	3,900 nmi (7,200 km; 4,500 mi) (Note: 216 pax, 176,100 lb / 79.9 t OEW, ISA)	6,590 nmi (12,200 km; 7,580 mi) (Note: 181 pax (15F/40J/126Y), CF6)	3,900 nmi (7,200 km; 4,500 mi) (Note: 269 pax, 187,900 lb / 85.2 t OEW, ISA)	5,980 nmi (11,070 km; 6,880 mi) (Note: 218 pax (18F/46J/154Y), PW4000) (Note: -300F: 3,225 nmi / 3,711 mi / 6,025 km (Note: 52.7 tonnes payload))	5,625 nmi (10,415 km; 6,473 mi) (Note: 245 pax (20F/50J/175Y), CF6)
Takeoff (Note: MTOW, SL, 30 °C / 86 °F)	6,300 ft (1,900 m)	8,150 ft (2,480 m)	9,200 ft (2,800 m)	8,700 ft (2,650 m)	10,800 ft (3,290 m)
Engines (×2)	JT9D / PW4000 / CF6	JT9D / PW4000 / CF6 / RB211		PW4000 / CF6 / RB211	CF6 / PW4000
Thrust (×2)	48,000–52,500 lbf (214–234 kN)	48,000–60,600 lbf (214–270 kN)	48,000–60,600 lbf (214–270 kN)	56,750–61,500 lbf (252–274 kN)	60,600 lbf (270 kN)

== Operators ==
In July 2018, 742 aircraft were in airline service: 73 -200s, 632 -300, and 37 -400ER with 65 -300F on order; the largest operators are Delta Air Lines (77), FedEx (60; largest cargo operator), UPS Airlines (59), United Airlines (51), Japan Airlines (35), All Nippon Airways (34).

The largest 767 customers by orders placed are FedEx Express (150), Delta Air Lines (117), All Nippon Airways (96), American Airlines (88), and United Airlines (82). Delta and United are the only customers of all -200, -300, and -400ER passenger variants. In July 2015, FedEx placed a firm order for 50 Boeing 767 freighters with deliveries from 2018 to 2023. The type's competitors included the Airbus A300 and A310.

=== Orders and deliveries ===
Year	Total	2026	2025	2024	2023	2022	2021	2020	2019	2018
Orders	1,451	6	15	23	30	31	65	11	26	40
Deliveries	1,380	29	30	18	32	33	32	30	43	27

Year	2017	2016	2015	2014	2013	2012	2011	2010	2009	2008	2007	2006	2005	2004	2003	2002	2001	2000	1999	1998
Orders	15	26	49	4	2	22	42	3	7	24	36	10	19	8	11	8	40	9	30	38
Deliveries	10	13	16	6	21	26	20	12	13	10	12	12	10	9	24	35	40	44	44	47

Year	1997	1996	1995	1994	1993	1992	1991	1990	1989	1988	1987	1986	1985	1984	1983	1982	1981	1980	1979	1978
Orders	79	43	22	17	54	21	65	52	100	83	57	23	38	15	20	2	5	11	45	49
Deliveries	42	43	37	41	51	63	62	60	37	53	37	27	25	29	55	20	–	–	–	–

Boeing 767 orders and deliveries (cumulative, by year):

Orders Deliveries — as of October 2026

=== Model summary ===
Model Series	ICAO code	Orders	Deliveries	Unfilled orders
767-200	B762	128	128	—
767-200ER	B762	121	121	—
767-2C (KC-46)	B762	189	125	64
767-300	B763	104	104	—
767-300ER	B763	583	583	—
767-300F	B763	288	281	7
767-400ER	B764	38	38	—
Total		1,451	1,380	71

- Data as of October 2026.

== Accidents and incidents ==
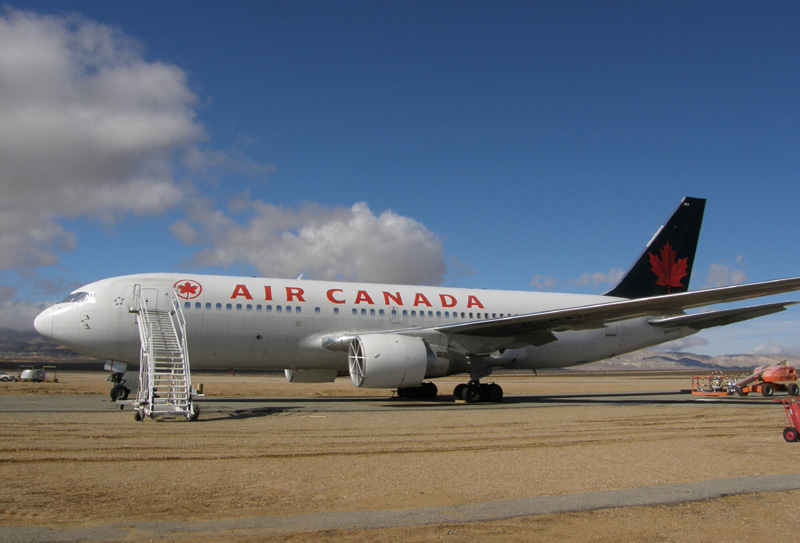
The "Gimli Glider" (C-GAUN) parked at Mojave Air and Space Port in February 2008

As of May 2026, the Boeing 767 has been in 68 aviation occurrences, including 19 hull-loss accidents. Eleven fatal crashes, including seven hijackings, have resulted in a total of 854 occupant fatalities.

=== Accidents ===
- The airliner's first fatal crash, Lauda Air Flight 004, occurred near Bangkok on May 26, 1991, following the in-flight deployment of the left engine thrust reverser on a 767-300ER. None of the 223 onboard survived. As a result of this accident, all 767 thrust reversers were deactivated until a redesign was implemented. Investigators determined that an electronically controlled valve, common to late-model Boeing aircraft, was to blame. A new locking device was installed on all affected jetliners, including 767s.
- On October 31, 1999, EgyptAir Flight 990, a 767-300ER, crashed off Nantucket, Massachusetts, in international waters killing all 217 people on board. The United States National Transportation Safety Board (NTSB) concluded that the crash was the "result of the relief first officer's flight control inputs"; the Egyptian government disputed this conclusion.
- On April 15, 2002, Air China Flight 129, a 767-200ER, crashed into a hill amid inclement weather while trying to land at Gimhae International Airport in Busan, South Korea. The crash resulted in the death of 129 of the 166 people on board, and the cause was attributed to pilot error. This was the deadliest plane crash in South Korea at the time.
- On February 23, 2019, Atlas Air Flight 3591, a Boeing 767-300ERF air freighter operating for Amazon Air, crashed into Trinity Bay near Houston, Texas, while on descent into George Bush Intercontinental Airport; both pilots and the single passenger were killed. The cause was attributed to pilot error and spatial disorientation.
- On September 6, 2026, 21 Air Flight 7598, a Boeing 767-33A freighter operated for Amazon Air, overran the runway while landing at Miami International Airport from Luis Muñoz Marín International Airport in San Juan, Puerto Rico. The crash resulted in five deaths on the ground and five injured, including both pilots of the aircraft. The incident is under investigation by the NTSB.

=== Hull losses ===
- On April 6, 1993, TACA Flight 510, a 767-2S1ER, overran the runway on landing at La Aurora International Airport, Guatemala, after a flight from El Salvador International Airport, El Salvador. The accident was caused by pilot errors during the approach procedure. All 236 on board survived, but five on the aircraft and three on the ground were injured.
- On November 1, 2011, LOT Polish Airlines Flight 16, a 767-300ER, safely landed at Warsaw Chopin Airport in Warsaw, Poland, after a mechanical failure of the landing gear forced an emergency landing with the landing gear retracted. There were no injuries, but the aircraft involved was damaged and written off. An investigation determined that while a damaged hose had disabled the aircraft's primary landing gear extension system, an otherwise functional backup system was inoperative due to an accidentally deactivated circuit breaker.
- On October 29, 2015, Dynamic Airways Flight 405, a 767-200ER, caught fire while taxiing to the runway at Hollywood International Airport. There were no fatalities, but 22 people were injured, 1 of them seriously. The aircraft was written off.
- On October 28, 2016, American Airlines Flight 383, a 767-300ER with 161 passengers and 9 crew members, aborted takeoff at Chicago O'Hare Airport following an uncontained failure of the right GE CF6-80C2 engine. The engine failure, which hurled fragments over a considerable distance, caused a fuel leak, resulting in a fire under the right wing. Fire and smoke entered the cabin. All passengers and crew evacuated the aircraft, with 20 passengers and one flight attendant sustaining minor injuries using the evacuation slides.

=== Hijackings ===
The 767 has been involved in six hijackings, three resulting in loss of life, for a combined total of 282 occupant fatalities.

- On November 23, 1996, Ethiopian Airlines Flight 961, a 767-200ER (767-260ER), was hijacked and crash-landed in the Indian Ocean near the Comoros Islands after running out of fuel, killing 125 out of the 175 persons on board; this was a rare example of occupants surviving a land-based aircraft ditching on water.
- Two 767s under terrorist control were involved in the September 11 attacks on the World Trade Center in 2001, resulting in the collapse of its two main towers. American Airlines Flight 11, a 767-200ER (767-223ER), crashed into the North Tower, killing all 92 people on board, and United Airlines Flight 175, a 767-200 (767-222), crashed into the South Tower, with the death of all 65 on board. In addition, more than 2,600 people were killed in the towers or on the ground.
- On December 22, 2001, Richard Reid, a British man, unsuccessfully attempted to detonate a bomb on an American Airlines 767-300ER (767-323ER) flying Flight 63 from Charles de Gaulle Airport in Paris to Miami International Airport. The aircraft was escorted by fighter jets to Logan International Airport in Boston, Massachusetts, where Reid was arrested.

=== Incidents ===
The 767's first incident was Air Canada Flight 143, a 767-200, on July 23, 1983. The airplane ran out of fuel at an altitude of about 41,000 feet. Eventually, the pilots had to glide with both engines out for almost 43 nautical miles (80 km; 49 mi) to an emergency landing at Gimli, Manitoba, Canada. The pilots used the aircraft's ram air turbine to power the hydraulic systems for aerodynamic control. There were no fatalities and only minor injuries. This aircraft was nicknamed "Gimli Glider" after its landing site. The aircraft, registered as C-GAUN, continued flying for Air Canada until its retirement in January 2008.

In January 2014, the U.S. Federal Aviation Administration issued a directive that ordered inspections of the elevators on more than 400 767s beginning in March 2014; the focus was on fasteners and other parts that can fail and cause the elevators to jam. The issue was first identified in 2000 and has been the subject of several Boeing service bulletins. The inspections and repairs are required to be completed within six years. The aircraft has also had multiple occurrences of "uncommanded escape slide inflation" during maintenance or operations, and during flight. In late 2015, the FAA issued a preliminary directive to address the issue.

== Aircraft on display ==
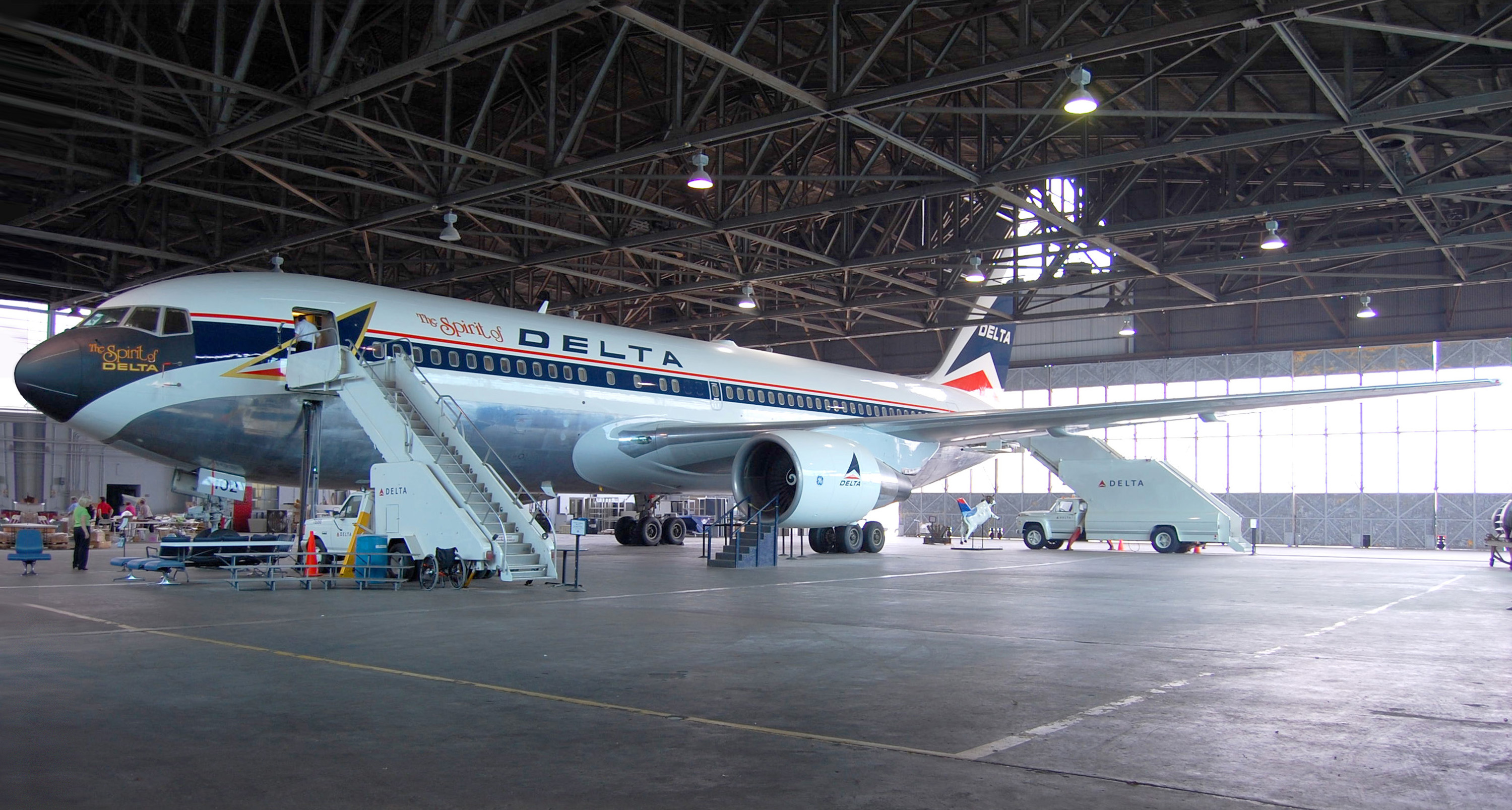
"The Spirit of Delta" at the Delta Air Lines Air Transport Heritage Museum

As new 767 variants roll off the assembly line, older series models have been retired and converted to cargo use, stored, or scrapped. One complete aircraft, N102DA, is the first 767-200 to operate for Delta Air Lines and the twelfth example built. It was retired from airline service in February 2006 after being repainted back to its original 1982 Delta widget livery and given a farewell tour. It was then put on display at the Delta Flight Museum in the Delta corporate campus at the edge of Hartsfield–Jackson Atlanta International Airport. "The Spirit of Delta" is on public display as of 2022.

In 2013 a Brazilian entrepreneur purchased a 767-200 that had operated for the now-defunct carrier Transbrasil under the registration PT-TAC. The aircraft, which was sold at a bankruptcy auction, was placed on outdoor display in Taguatinga as part of a proposed commercial development. As of 2019, however, the development has not come to fruition. The aircraft is devoid of engines or landing gear and has deteriorated due to weather exposure and acts of vandalism but remains publicly accessible to view.

== Specifications (Boeing 767-300ER with PW4060 engines) ==
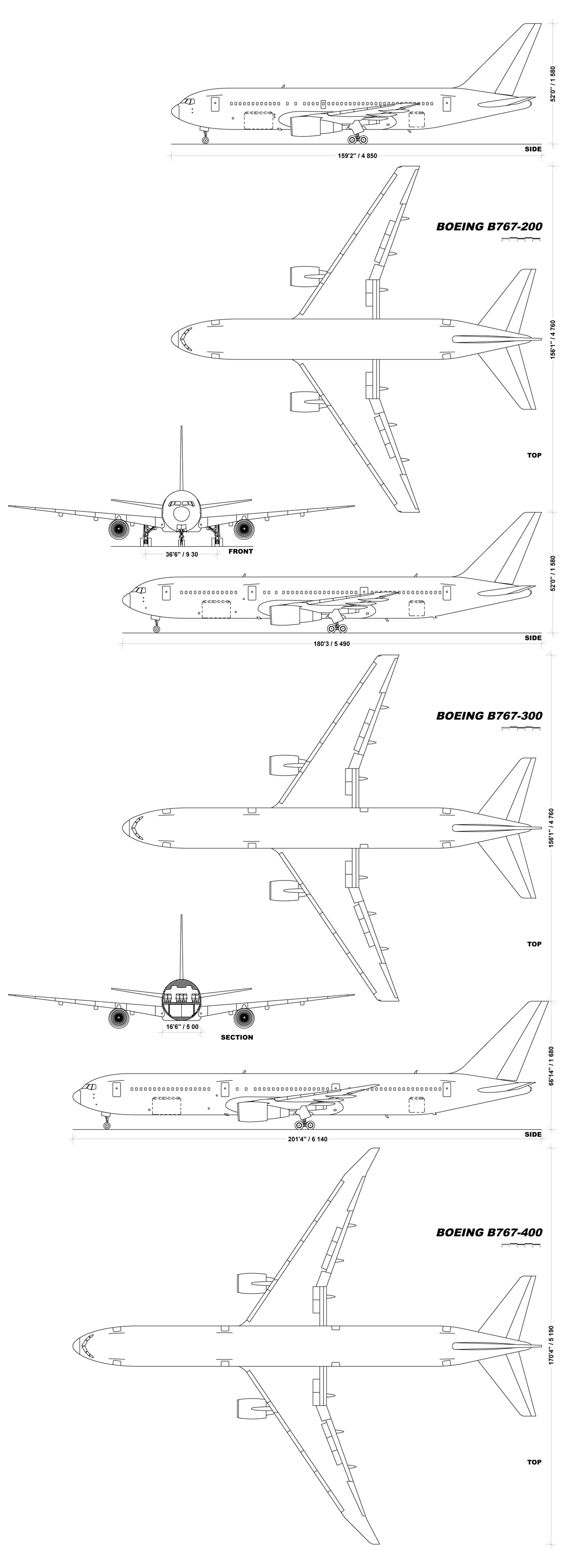
Boeing 767

Data from

General characteristics

- Crew: 2
- Capacity: 290 (all economy), 299 (all economy with extra exit doors), or 261 (two classes) passengers, 4,030 cu ft (114.1 m3) of cargo (including 30 LD2 containers)
- Length: 180 ft 3 in (54.94 m)
- Wingspan: 156 ft 1 in (47.57 m)
- Width: 16 ft 6 in (5.03 m) (fuselage)
- Height: 52 ft 7 in (16.03 m)
- Wing area: 3,049.4 sq ft (283.30 m^{2})
- Aspect ratio: 7.99
- Empty weight: 198,440 lb (90,011 kg)
- Max takeoff weight: 412,000 lb (186,880 kg)
- Fuel capacity: 24,140 US Gal (91,380 L) (161,740 lb (73,364 kg) by weight) usable fuel
- Powerplant: 2 × Pratt & Whitney PW4060 high-bypass turbofan engines, 60,000 lbf (270 kN) thrust each

Performance

- Maximum speed: 410 mph (670 km/h, 360 kn) calibrated airspeed
- Maximum speed: Mach 0.86
- Cruise speed: 528 mph (850 km/h, 459 kn) at 39,000 ft (12,000 m)
- Range: 6,630 mi (10,670 km, 5,760 nmi)
- Service ceiling: 43,100 ft (13,100 m)
- Takeoff distance: 9,600 ft (2,926 m)
- Landing distance: 5,710 ft (1,740 m)

== See also ==
- Competition between Airbus and Boeing

Related development

- Boeing 757
- Boeing E-767
- Boeing KC-46 Pegasus
- Boeing KC-767
- Northrop Grumman E-10 MC2A

Aircraft of comparable role, configuration, and era

- Airbus A300
- Airbus A310
- Airbus A330

Related lists

- List of jet airliners
- List of civil aircraft

== Sources ==
- Becher, Thomas (1999). Boeing 757 and 767. Marlborough (Wiltshire): Crowood Press. ISBN 1-86126-197-7.
- Birtles, Philip (1999). Boeing 757/767/777. London: Ian Allan Publishing "Modern Civil Aircraft" n. 6, 3rd ed. ISBN 0-7110-2665-3.
- Davies, R.E.G. (2000). TWA: an airline and its aircraft. McLean, Virginia: Paladwr Press. ISBN 1-888962-16-X.
- Donald, David, ed. (1997). The Complete Encyclopedia of World Aircraft. New York, NY: Barnes & Noble Books. ISBN 0-7607-0592-5.
- Eden, Paul, ed. (2008). Civil Aircraft Today: The World's Most Successful Commercial Aircraft. Silverdale, Washington: Amber Books Ltd. ISBN 978-1-84509-324-2.
- Frawley, Gerard (2001). The International Directory of Civil Aircraft. Weston Creek, Australian Capital Territory: Aerospace Publications. ISBN 1-875671-52-8.
- Haenggi, Michael (2003). 767 Transatlantic Titan. "Boeing Widebodies" series. Osceola, Wisconsin: Motorbooks International. ISBN 0-7603-0842-X.
- Kane, Robert M. (2003). Air Transportation 1903–2003. 14th ed.. Dubuque, Iowa: Kendall Hunt Publishing. ISBN 978-0-7872-8881-5.
- Norris, Guy; Wagner, Mark (1996). Boeing Jetliners. Osceola, Wisconsin: MBI Publishing. ISBN 0-7603-0034-8.
- Norris, Guy; Wagner, Mark (1998). Boeing. Osceola, Wisconsin: MBI Publishing. ISBN 0-7603-0497-1.
- Norris, Guy; Wagner, Mark (1999). "767: Stretching and Growing". Modern Boeing Jetliners. Osceola, Wisconsin: Zenith Imprint. ISBN 0-7603-0717-2.
- Norris, Guy; Wagner, Mark (2001). Boeing 777, The Technological Marvel. Osceola, Wisconsin: Zenith Press. ISBN 0-7603-0890-X.
- Norris, Guy; Wagner, Mark (2009). Boeing 787 Dreamliner. Osceola, Wisconsin: Zenith Press. ISBN 978-0-7603-2815-6.
- Shaw, Robbie (1999). Boeing 757 & 767, Medium Twins. Reading, Pennsylvania: Osprey Publishing. ISBN 1-85532-903-4.
- Smil, Vaclav (1998). Transforming the Twentieth Century: Technical Innovations and Their Consequences. Oxford, Oxfordshire: Oxford University Press. ISBN 0-19-516875-5.
- Sutter, Joe (2006). 747: Creating the World's First Jumbo Jet and Other Adventures from a Life in Aviation. Washington, D.C.: Smithsonian Books. ISBN 0-06-088241-7.
- Taylor, John W.R., ed. (1989). Jane's All the World's Aircraft 1989–90. London: Jane's Yearbooks. ISBN 0-7106-0896-9.
- Wells, Alexander T.; Rodrigues, Clarence C. (2004). Commercial Aviation Safety. New York, NY: McGraw-Hill Professional. ISBN 0-07-141742-7.
- Wilson, Stewart (2002). Ansett: The Story of the Rise and Fall of Ansett, 1936–2002. Weston Creek, Australian Capital Territory: Aerospace Publications. ISBN 978-1-875671-57-1.
