= Boeing 757 =

Large single-aisle airliner family

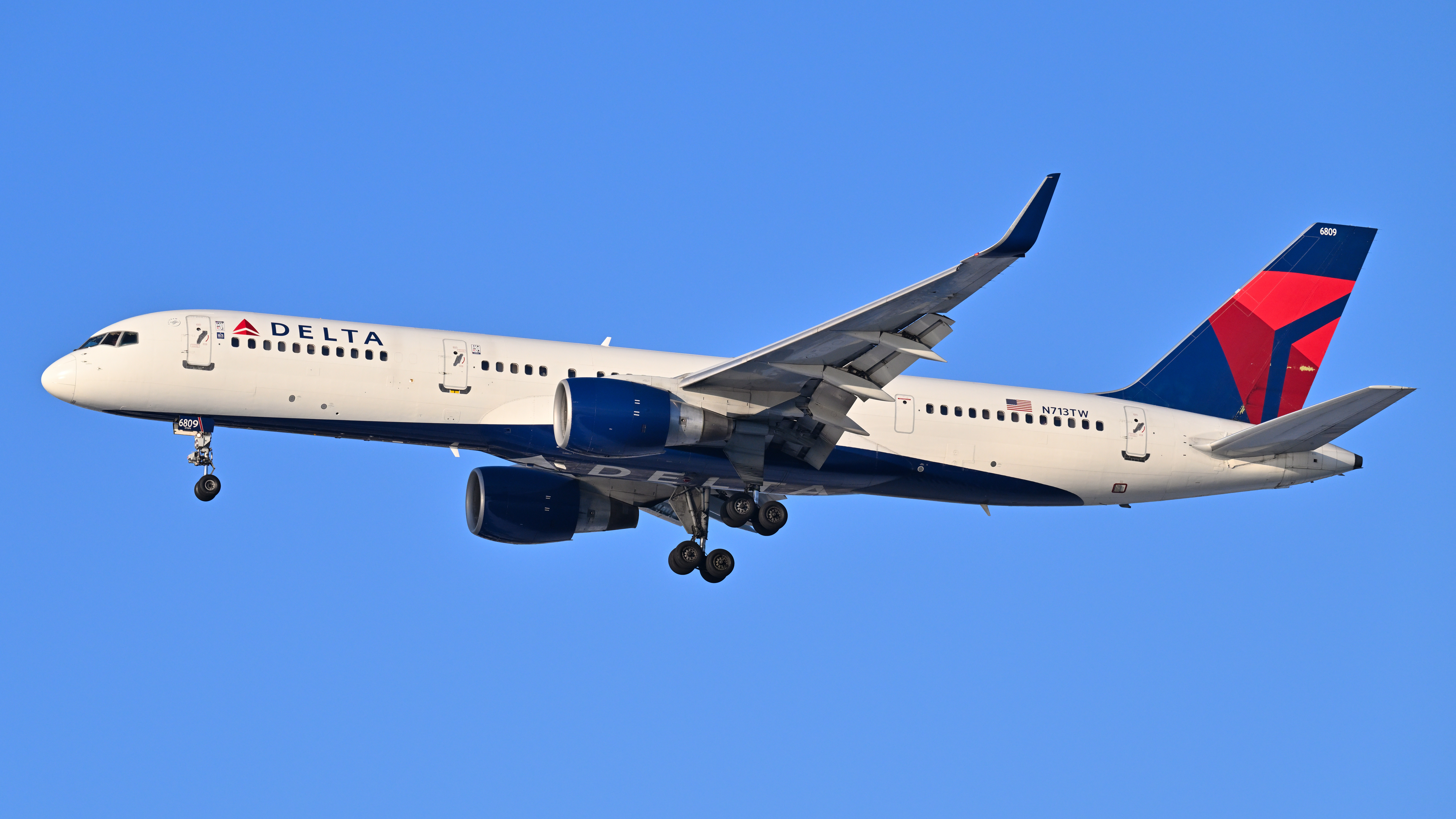
- A Boeing 757-200 of Delta Air Lines, the largest operator

General information
- Type: Narrow-body jet airliner
- National origin: United States
- Manufacturer: Boeing Commercial Airplanes
- Status: In service
- Primary users: Delta Air Lines: FedEx Express; United Airlines; UPS Airlines
- Number built: 1,050

History
- Manufactured: 1981–2004
- Introduction date: January 1, 1983 with Eastern Air Lines
- First flight: February 19, 1982; 44 years ago
- Variant: Boeing C-32

The Boeing 757 is an American narrow-body airliner designed and built by Boeing Commercial Airplanes. The then-named 7N7, a twinjet successor to the trijet 727, received its first orders in August 1978. The prototype made its maiden flight on February 19, 1982, and it was certified by the Federal Aviation Administration (FAA) on December 21, 1982. Eastern Air Lines placed the initial 757-200 variant in commercial service on January 1, 1983. A package freighter (PF) variant entered service in September 1987 followed by a combi model in September 1988. The stretched 757-300 was launched in September 1996 and began service in March 1999. After 1,050 had been built for 54 customers, production ended in October 2004, as Boeing offered the largest 737 Next Generation variants as a successor to the -200.

The jetliner is powered by 36,600–43,500 lbf (163–193 kN) Rolls-Royce RB211 or Pratt & Whitney PW2000 underwing turbofan engines for a 255,000–273,000 lb (116–124 t) maximum takeoff weight (MTOW). The 757 has a 2,000 sq ft (185 m^{2}) supercritical wing for reduced aerodynamic drag and a conventional tail. It keeps the 707 fuselage width and six–abreast seating and its two-crew glass cockpit has a common type rating with the concurrently designed 767 (a wide-body aircraft). It was produced in two fuselage lengths: the 155 ft (47.3 m) long 757-200 (the most popular with 913 built) typically seats 200 passengers in two classes over 3,915 nautical miles [nmi] (7,250 km; 4,505 mi); while the 178 ft (54.4 m) long 757-300 typically seats 243 over 3,400 nmi (6,295 km; 3,900 mi). The 757-200F can haul a 72,210 lb (32,755 kg) payload over 2,935 nmi (5,435 km; 3,378 mi). Passenger 757-200s have been modified for cargo use as the Special Freighter (SF) and the Precision Converted Freighter (PCF).

Major customers for the 757 included U.S. mainline carriers, European charter airlines, and cargo companies. It was commonly used for short and mid-range domestic routes, shuttle services, and transcontinental U.S. flights. ETOPS extended flights were approved in 1986 to fly intercontinental routes. Private and government operators have customized the 757 as VIP carriers such as the US C-32. In July 2017, there were 665 Boeing 757 in commercial service, with Delta Air Lines being the largest operator with 127 airplanes in its fleet. The aircraft has recorded ten hull-loss accidents, as of August 2023.

== Development ==
=== Background ===
In the early 1970s, following the launch of the first wide-body airliner, the 747, Boeing began considering further developments of its narrow-body 727. Designed for short and medium length routes, the trijet was the best-selling jetliner of the 1960s and a mainstay of the U.S. domestic airline market. Studies focused on improving the 189-seat 727-200, the most successful variant. Two approaches were considered: a stretched 727 (to be designated 727-300), and an all-new aircraft code-named 7N7. The former was a cheaper derivative using the 727's existing technology and tail-mounted engine configuration, while the latter was a twin-engine aircraft which made use of new materials and improvements to propulsion technology which had become available in the civil aerospace industry.

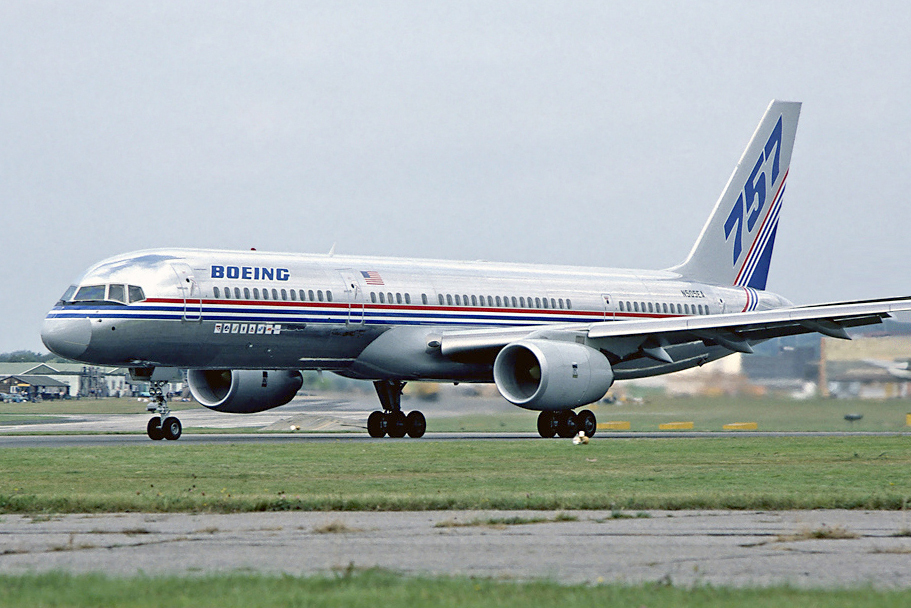
The 7N7 made its Farnborough Airshow debut in 1982 as the 757-200.

United Airlines provided input for the proposed 727-300, which Boeing was poised to launch in late 1975, but lost interest after examining development studies for the 7N7. Although the 727-300 was offered to Braniff International Airways and other carriers, customer interest remained insufficient for further development. Instead, airlines were drawn to the high-bypass-ratio turbofan engines, new flight deck technologies, lower weight, improved aerodynamics, and reduced operating cost promised by the 7N7. These features were also included in a parallel development effort for a new mid-size wide-body airliner, code-named 7X7, which became the 767. Work on both proposals accelerated as a result of the airline industry upturn in the late 1970s.

By 1978, development studies focused on two variants: a 7N7-100 with seating for 160, and a 7N7-200 with room for over 180 seats. New features included a redesigned wing, under-wing engines, and lighter materials, while the forward fuselage, cockpit layout, and T-tail configuration were retained from the 727. Boeing planned for the aircraft to offer the lowest fuel burn per passenger-kilometer of any narrow-body airliner. On August 31, 1978, Eastern Air Lines and British Airways became the first carriers to publicly commit to the 7N7 when they announced launch orders totaling 40 aircraft for the 7N7-200 version. These orders were signed in March 1979, when Boeing officially designated the aircraft as the 757. The shorter 757-100 did not receive any orders and was dropped; 737s later fulfilled its envisioned role.

=== Design effort ===
The 757 was intended to be more capable and more efficient than the preceding 727. The focus on fuel efficiency reflected airline concerns over operating costs, which had grown amid rising oil prices during the Yom Kippur War of 1973. Design targets included a 20 percent reduction in fuel consumption from new engines, plus 10 percent from aerodynamic improvements, versus preceding aircraft. Lighter materials and new wings were also expected to improve efficiency. The maximum take-off weight (MTOW) was set at 220,000 pounds (99,800 kg), which was 10,000 pounds (4,540 kg) more than the 727. The 757's higher thrust-to-weight ratio allowed it to take off from short runways and serve airports in hot and high conditions with higher ambient temperatures and thinner air, offering better takeoff performance than that offered by competing aircraft. Competitors needed longer takeoff runs for these hot and high conditions. Boeing also offered options for higher payload capability.

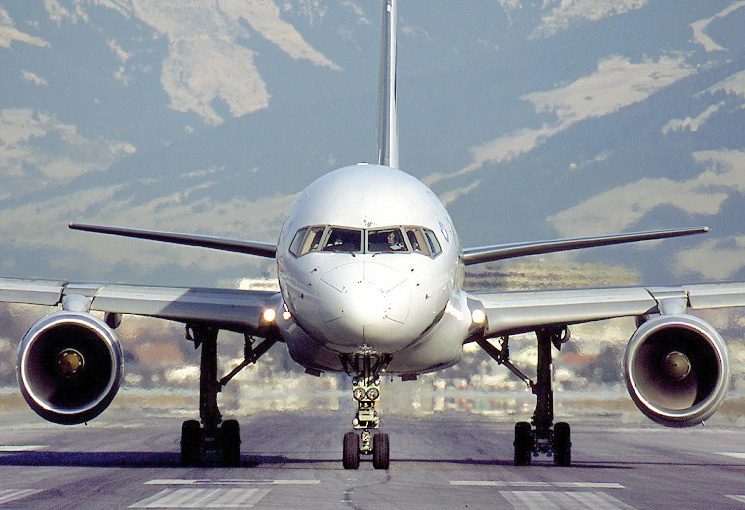
Forward view of a Transavia Airlines 757-200, showing fuselage profile, wing dihedral, and RB211 engines

The twin-engine configuration was chosen for greater fuel efficiency versus three- and four-engine designs. Launch customers Eastern Air Lines and British Airways selected the RB211-535C turbofan built by Rolls-Royce, which was capable of 37,400 pounds-force (166 kN) of thrust. This marked the first time that a Boeing airliner was launched with engines produced outside the U.S. Domestic manufacturer Pratt & Whitney subsequently offered the 38,200 pounds-force (170 kN) thrust PW2037, which Delta Air Lines launched with an order for 60 aircraft in November 1980. General Electric also offered its CF6-32 engine early in the program, but eventually abandoned its involvement due to insufficient demand.

As development progressed, the 757 increasingly departed from its 727 origins and adopted elements from the 767, which was several months ahead in development. To reduce risk and cost, Boeing combined design work on both twinjets, resulting in shared features such as interior fittings and handling characteristics. Computer-aided design, first applied on the 767, was used for over one-third of the 757's design drawings. In early 1979, a common two-crew member glass cockpit was adopted for the two aircraft, including shared instrumentation, avionics, and flight management systems. In October 1979 the nose was widened and dropped to reduce aerodynamic noise by six dB, to improve the flight deck view and to give more working area for the crew and for greater commonality with the 767. Cathode-ray tube (CRT) color displays replaced conventional electromechanical instruments, with increased automation eliminating the flight engineer position common to three-person cockpits. After completing a short conversion course, pilots rated on the 757 could be qualified to fly the 767 and vice versa, due to their design similarities.

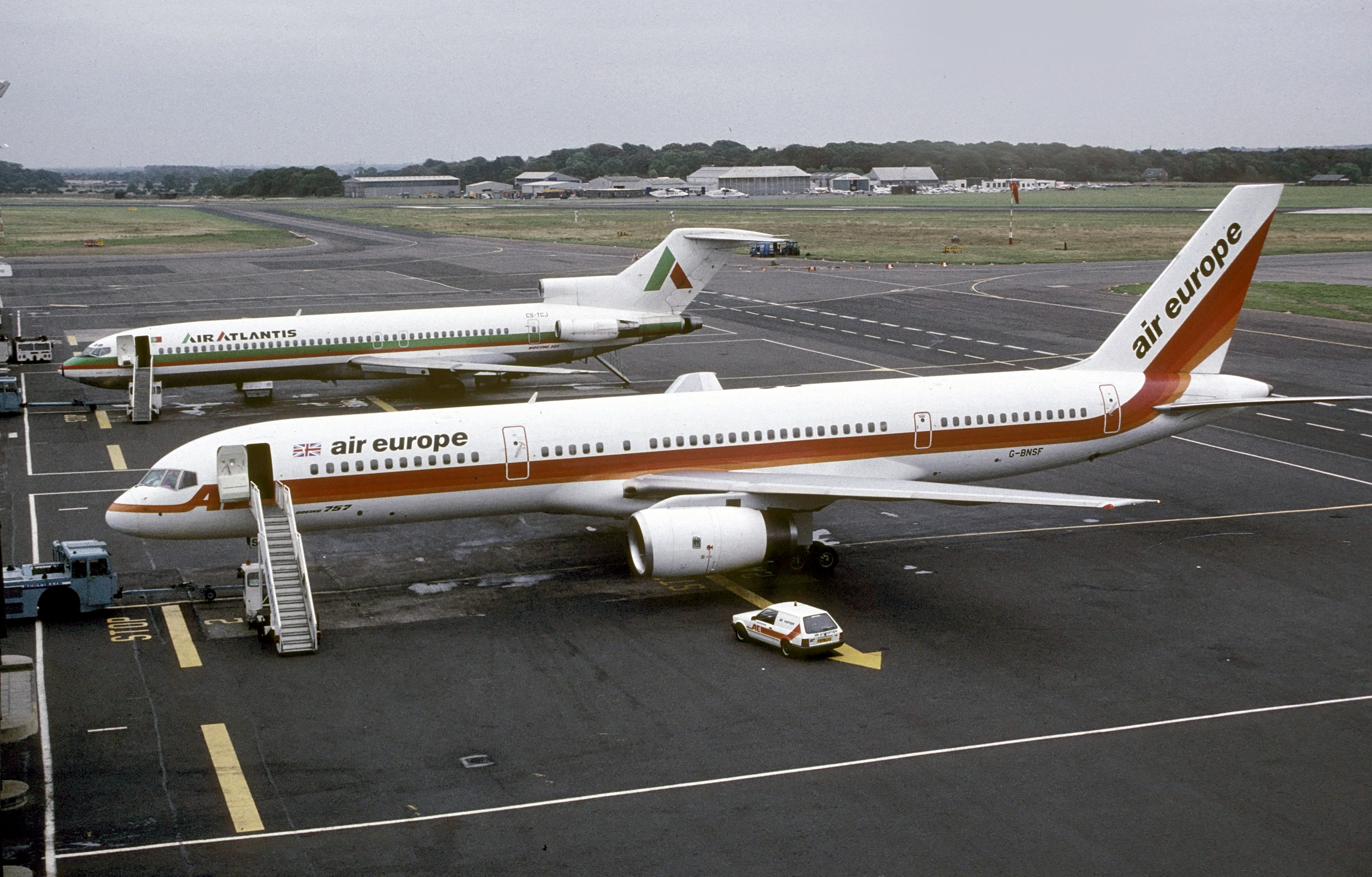
Predecessor and successor: an Air Atlantis 727-200 and an Air Europe 757-200

A new aft-loaded shape which produced lift across most of the upper wing surface, instead of a narrow band as in previous airfoil designs, was used for the 757's wings. The more efficient wings had less drag and greater fuel capacity, and were similar in configuration to those on the 767. A wider wingspan than the 727's produced less lift-induced drag, while larger wing roots increased undercarriage storage space and provided room for future stretched versions of the aircraft.

One of the last 727 vestiges, the T-tail, was dropped in mid-1979 in favor of a conventional tail. This avoided the risk of an aerodynamic condition known as a deep stall, and allowed for more passengers to be carried in a less tapered rear fuselage. At 155.3 feet (47.3 m) in length, the 757-200 was 2.1 feet (0.640 m) longer than the 727-200, and with a greater proportion of its internal volume devoted to cabin space, seating was available for 239 passengers, or 50 more than its predecessor. The fuselage cross-section, whose upper lobe was common to the 707 and 737, was the only major structural feature to be retained from the 727. This was mainly to reduce drag, and while a wider fuselage had been considered, Boeing's market research found low cargo capacity needs and reduced passenger preference for wide-body aircraft on short-haul routes.

=== Production and testing ===
Boeing built a final assembly line in Washington at its Renton factory, home of 707, 727, and 737 production, to produce the 757. Early in the development program, Boeing, British Airways, and Rolls-Royce unsuccessfully lobbied the British aircraft industry to manufacture 757 wings. Ultimately, about half of the aircraft's components, including the wings, nose section, and empennage, were produced in-house at Boeing facilities with the remainder subcontracted to primarily U.S.-based companies. Fairchild Aircraft made the leading edge slats, Grumman supplied the flaps, and Rockwell International produced the main fuselage. Production ramp-up for the new narrow-body airliner coincided with the winding-down of the 727 program, and final assembly of the first aircraft began in January 1981.

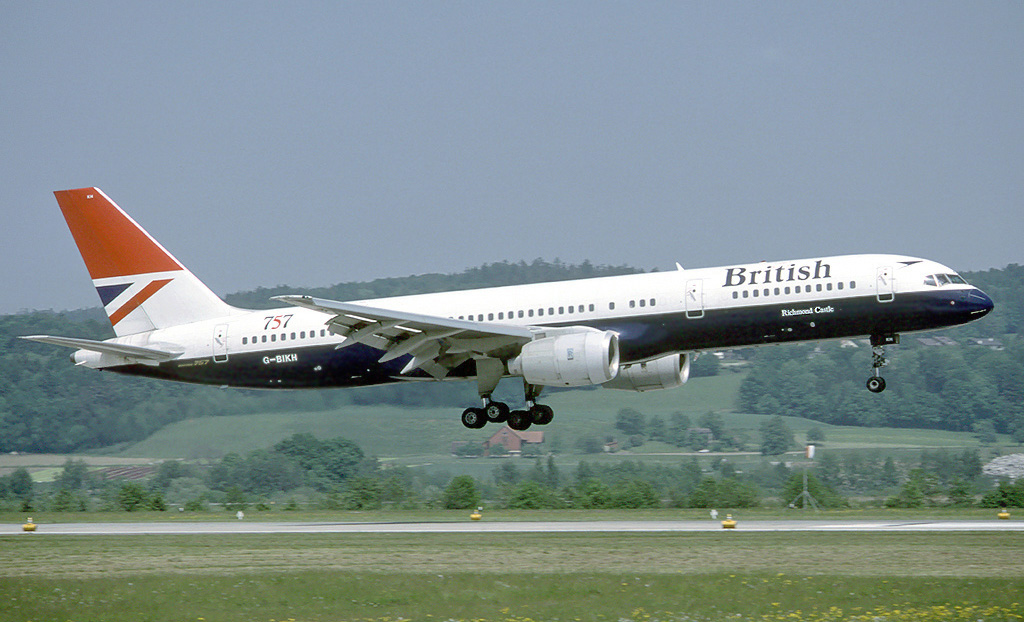
British Airways was one of the first customers for the RB211-powered 757.

The prototype 757 rolled out of the Renton factory on January 13, 1982. The aircraft, equipped with RB211-535C engines, completed its maiden flight one week ahead of schedule on February 19, 1982. The first flight was affected by an engine stall, following indications of low oil pressure. After checking system diagnostics, company test pilot John Armstrong and co-pilot Lew Wallick were able to restart the affected engine, and the flight proceeded normally thereafter. Subsequently, the 757 embarked on a seven-day weekly flight test schedule. By this time, the aircraft had received 136 orders from seven carriers, namely Air Florida, American Airlines, British Airways, Delta Air Lines, Eastern Air Lines, Monarch Airlines, and Transbrasil.

The first 757 was modified into the F-22 Flying Test Bed.

The seven-month 757 flight test program used the first five aircraft built. Tasks included flight systems and propulsion tests, hot and cold weather trials, and route-proving flights. Data from the 767 program helped expedite the process. After design issues were identified, the 757's exit doors received dual-spring mechanisms for easier operation, and the fuselage was strengthened for greater bird strike resistance. The production aircraft was 3,600 pounds (1,630 kg) lighter than originally specified, and recorded a three percent better-than-expected rate of fuel burn. This resulted in a range increase of 200 nautical miles (370 km; 230 mi), and prompted Boeing to tout the aircraft's fuel efficiency characteristics. After 1,380 flight test hours, the RB211-powered 757 received U.S. Federal Aviation Administration (FAA) certification on December 21, 1982, followed by UK Civil Aviation Authority (CAA) certification on January 14, 1983. The first delivery to launch customer Eastern Air Lines occurred on December 22, 1982, about four months after the first 767 deliveries. The first 757 with PW2037 engines rolled out about one year later, and was delivered to Delta Air Lines on November 5, 1984. The first 757 was later modified into the F-22 Flying Test Bed to serve as a flying avionics laboratory for the F-22 Raptor fighter aircraft.

=== Service entry and operations ===
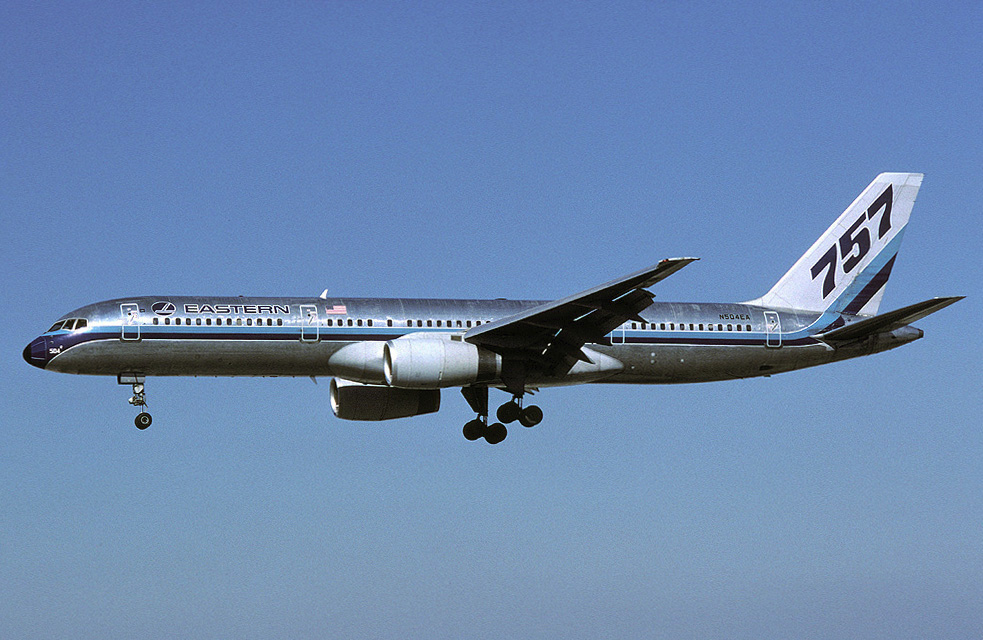
Eastern Air Lines began domestic 757 operations in January 1983 and later deployed the aircraft on transcontinental routes.

Eastern Air Lines operated the first commercial 757 flight on January 1, 1983, on the Atlanta-to-Tampa route. On February 9, 1983, British Airways began using the aircraft for London-to-Belfast shuttle services, where it replaced Hawker Siddeley Trident 3B trijets. Charter carriers Monarch Airlines and Air Europe also began 757 operations later that year. Early operators noted improved reliability and quieter performance compared with previous jetliners. Transition courses eased pilots' introduction to the new CRT-based cockpit, and no major technical issues arose. Eastern Air Lines, the first 727 operator to take delivery of 757s, confirmed that the aircraft had greater payload capability than its predecessor, along with lower operating costs through improved fuel burn and the use of a two-crew member flight deck. Compared with the 707 and 727, the new twinjet consumed 42 and 40 percent less fuel per seat, respectively, on typical medium-haul flights.

Despite the successful debut, 757 sales remained stagnant for most of the 1980s, a consequence of declining fuel prices and a shift to smaller aircraft in the post-deregulation U.S. market. Although no direct competitor existed, 150-seat narrow-bodies such as the McDonnell Douglas MD-80 were less expensive and carried nearly as many passengers as some airlines' 757s. A three-year sales drought abated in November 1983 when Northwest Airlines placed orders for 20 aircraft, which averted a costly production rate decrease. In December 1985, a freighter model, the 757-200PF, was announced following a launch order for 20 aircraft from UPS Airlines, and in February 1986, a freighter-passenger combi model, the 757-200M, was launched with an order for one aircraft from Royal Nepal Airlines. The freighter model included a main deck cargo hold and entered service with UPS in September 1987. The combi model could carry both cargo and passengers on its main deck and entered service with Royal Nepal Airlines in September 1988.

In the late 1980s, increasing airline hub congestion and the onset of U.S. airport noise regulations fueled a turnaround in 757 sales. From 1988 to 1989, airlines placed 322 orders, including a combined 160 orders from American Airlines and United Airlines. By this time, the 757 had become commonplace on short-haul domestic flights and transcontinental services in the U.S., and had replaced aging 707s, 727s, Douglas DC-8s, and McDonnell Douglas DC-9s. The 757-200's maximum range of 3,900 nautical miles (7,220 km; 4,490 mi), which was over one-and-a-half times the 727's, allowed airlines to use the aircraft on longer nonstop routes. The 757 was also flown out of airports with stringent noise regulations, such as John Wayne Airport in Orange County, California, and airports with aircraft size restrictions, such as Washington National Airport near downtown Washington, D.C. The largest U.S. operators, Delta Air Lines and American Airlines, would ultimately operate fleets of over 100 aircraft each.

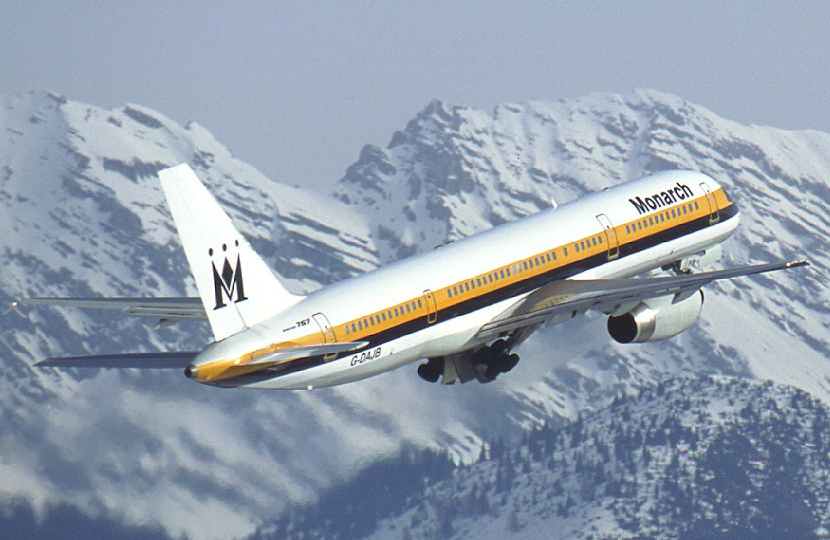
Monarch Airlines began 757 charter services in March 1983.

In Europe, British Airways, Iberia, and Icelandair were the 757's largest mainline customers, while other carriers such as Lufthansa rejected the type as too large for their narrow-body aircraft needs. Many European charter airlines, including Air 2000, Air Holland, and LTU International, also acquired the twinjet for holiday and tour package flights in the late 1980s. In Asia, where even larger aircraft were commonly preferred because of greater passenger volumes, the 757 found fewer orders. A 1982 sales demonstration was unable to attract a purchase from potential customer Japan Airlines, and the first Asian customer, Singapore Airlines, sold its four 757s in 1989 in favor of standardizing on the 240-seat wide-body Airbus A310, just five years after debuting the type on Indonesian and Malaysian routes. The 757 fared better in China, where following an initial purchase by the CAAC Airlines in 1987, orders grew to 59 aircraft, making it the largest Asian market. Operators such as China Southern, China Southwest, Shanghai Airlines, Xiamen Airlines, and Xinjiang Airlines used the 757 on medium length domestic routes.

In 1986, the FAA approved RB211-powered 757s for extended-range twin-engine operational performance standards (ETOPS) operations over the North Atlantic, following precedents set by the 767. Under ETOPS regulations, a set of safety standards governing twinjet flights over oceans and other areas without nearby suitable landing sites, airlines began using the aircraft for mid-range intercontinental routes. Although the 757 was not originally intended for transoceanic flights, regulators based their decision on its reliable performance record on extended transcontinental U.S. services. ETOPS certification for 757s equipped with PW2000 series engines was granted in 1992.

In the early 1990s, the FAA and other U.S. government agencies, including the National Aeronautics and Space Administration (NASA) and the National Transportation Safety Board (NTSB), began studying the 757's wake turbulence characteristics. This followed several incidents, including two fatal crashes, in which small private aircraft experienced loss of control when flying close behind the twinjet. Smaller airliners had also suffered unexpected rolling movements when flying behind 757s. Investigators focused on the aircraft's aft-loaded wing design, which at certain points during takeoff or landing could produce wingtip vortices that were stronger than those emanating from larger 767s and 747s. Other tests were inconclusive, leading to debate among government agencies, and in 1994 and 1996 the FAA updated air traffic control regulations to require greater separation behind the 757 than other large-category jets. The 757 became the only sub-300,000-pound (136,000 kg) airliner to be classified as a "heavy" jet, alongside wide-body aircraft, under FAA separation rules.

=== Shortened variant: -100 ===
757-100 was a 150-seat, short fuselage version intended to offer similar capacity to a 727-200 but with greater range. Both the 757-100 and -200 were announced at the product launch on August 31, 1978, however the large wing and landing gear common with the 757-200 were found to be excessively heavy for an aircraft of that capacity. Planning for the 757-100 was discontinued in March 1979.

=== Stretched variant: -300 ===
Production of the 757 peaked at an annual rate of 100 aircraft in the early 1990s, during which time upgraded models came under consideration. For over a decade, the narrow-body twinjet had been its manufacturer's only single-aisle airliner without a stretched variant, and while rumors of a long-range 757-200X and stretched 757-300X persisted, no formal announcements had been made. European charter carriers were particularly interested in a higher-capacity version which could take better advantage of the 757's range. Besides meeting the needs of charter customers, a larger model would enable Boeing to match the passenger lift capabilities of the 767-200 with lower operating costs, and counter longer-range versions of the 185-seat Airbus A321, a new stretched variant of the A320 narrow-body airliner.

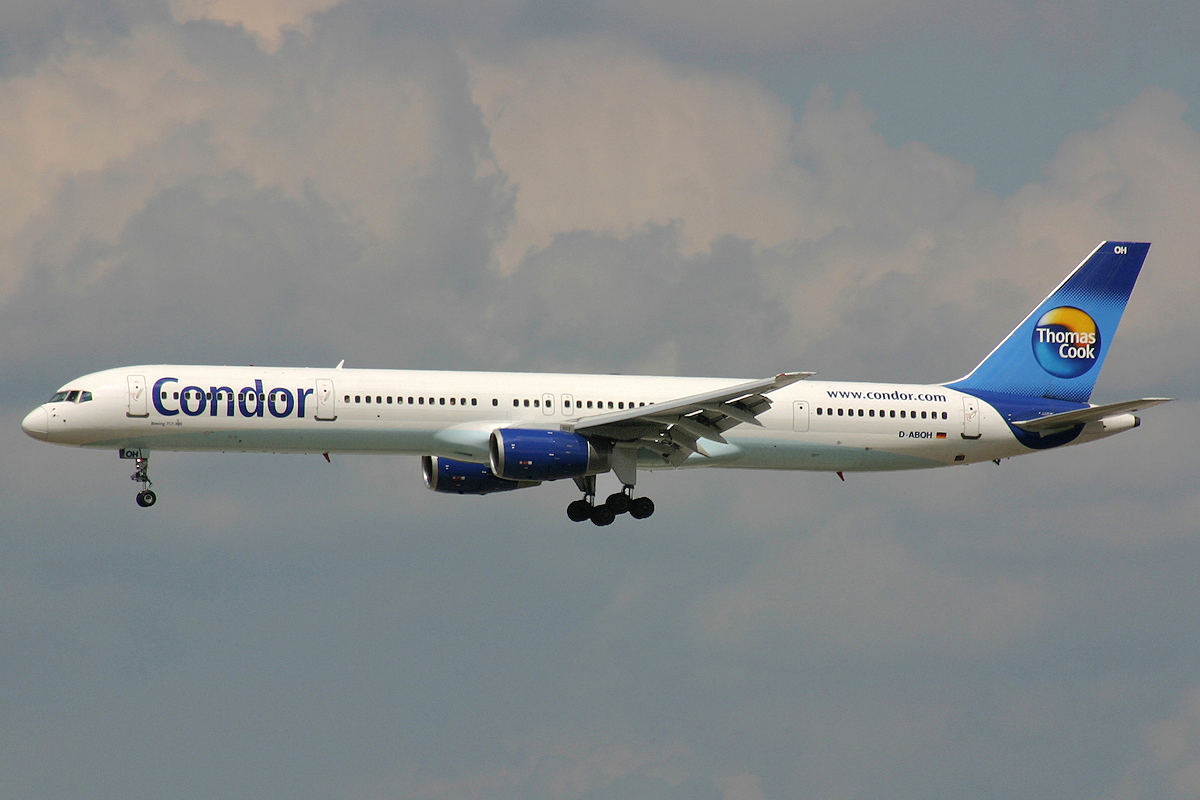
A 757-300 of launch customer Condor in 2005; they started operating the type in March 1999

In September 1996, following a launch order for 12 aircraft from charter carrier Condor, Boeing announced the stretched 757-300 at the Farnborough Airshow. The new model was a 23.4-foot (7.13 m) stretch of the 757-200, resulting in room for 50 more passengers and nearly 50 percent more cargo. The type's design phase was intended to be the shortest in its manufacturer's history, with 27 months from launch to certification. Due to development and cost concerns, radical upgrades such as a Next Generation 737-style advanced cockpit were not implemented. Instead, the stretched derivative received upgraded engines, enhanced avionics, and a redesigned interior. The first 757-300 rolled out on May 31, 1998, and completed its maiden flight on August 2, 1998. Following regulatory certification in January 1999, the type entered service with Condor on March 19, 1999.

The 757-300 was also ordered by American Trans Air, Arkia Israel Airlines, Continental Airlines, Icelandair, and Northwest Airlines. Sales for the variant remained slow, and ultimately totaled 55 of the -300. Boeing had targeted the 757-300 as a potential 767-200 replacement for two of its largest customers, American Airlines and United Airlines, but neither were in a financial position to commit to new aircraft. Overtures to other charter airlines also did not result in further orders. By November 1999, faced with diminishing sales and a reduced backlog despite the launch of the 757-300, Boeing began studying a decrease in 757 production rates.

=== Further developments ===
While the 757 program had been financially successful, declining sales in the early 2000s threatened its continued viability. Airlines were again gravitating toward smaller aircraft, now mainly the 737 and A320, because of their reduced financial risk. An airline industry downturn and the large number of relatively young 757s already in service also reduced customer demand. In 2000, spurred by interest from Air 2000 and Continental Airlines, Boeing reexamined the possibility of building a longer-range 757-200X. The proposed derivative would have featured auxiliary fuel tanks, plus wing and landing gear upgrades from the 757-300, resulting in a higher MTOW and a potential range increase to over 5,000 nautical miles (9,260 km; 5,750 mi). However, the proposal failed to garner any orders. In March 2001, Boeing delivered the first 757-200SF, a second-hand 757-200 converted for freighter use, to DHL Aviation. The 757-200SF marked the manufacturer's first foray into passenger-to-freighter conversions.

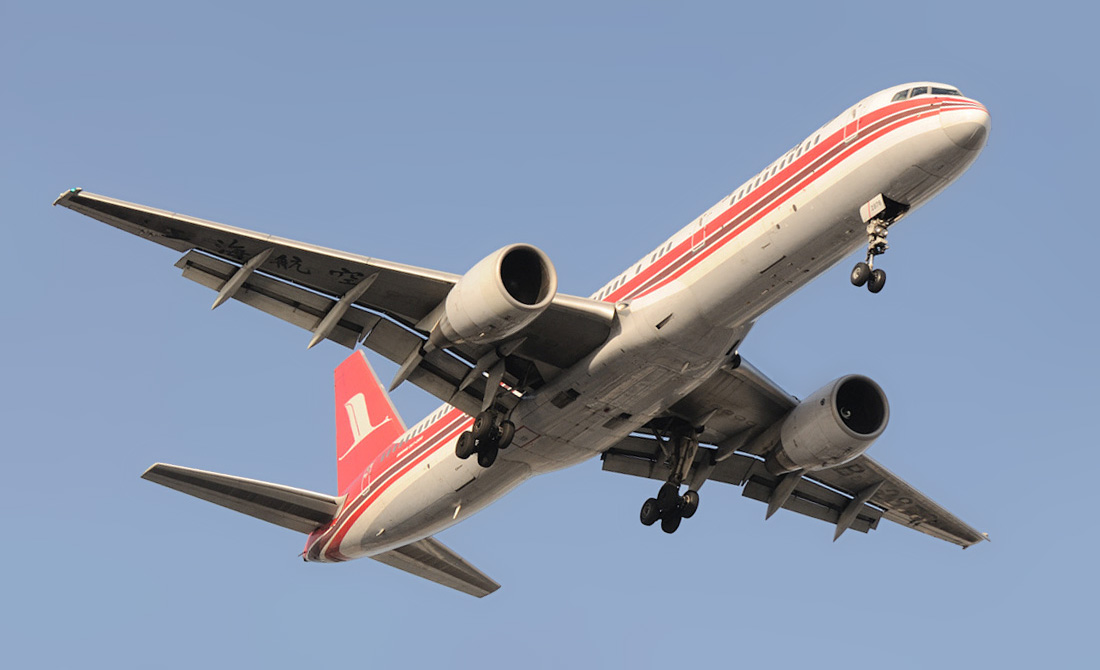
Shanghai Airlines received the last production 757, B-2876, in November 2005.

Customer interest in new 757s continued to decline, and in 2003, a renewed sales campaign centered on the 757-300 and 757-200PF yielded only five new orders. In October 2003, following Continental Airlines' decision to switch its remaining 757-300 orders to the 737-800, Boeing announced the end of 757 production. The 1,050th and last example, a 757-200 built for Shanghai Airlines, rolled off the production line at the Renton factory on October 28, 2004, and was delivered on November 28, 2005, after several months of storage. With the conclusion of the 757 program, Boeing consolidated 737 assembly at its Renton factory, downsizing its facilities by 40 percent and shifting staff to different locations.

Since the end of production, many Boeing 757s have remained in service, mainly in the U.S. From 2004 to 2008, the average fuel cost for typical mid-range U.S. domestic 757 flights tripled, putting pressure on airlines to improve the fuel efficiency of their fleets. In May 2005, the FAA granted regulatory approval for manufacturer-sanctioned blended winglets from Aviation Partners as a retrofit on the 757-200. The winglets improve fuel efficiency by five percent and increase range by 200 nautical miles (370 km; 230 mi) through the reduction of lift-induced drag. Continental Airlines was the first carrier to order winglets for the 757-200, and in February 2009 became the first operator of 757-300s with winglets. Aviation Partners further developed the blended winglet into the Scimitar Blended Winglet, which improves fuel burn by 1.1% over the original blended winglet. Icelandair and United Airlines have retrofitted their 757-200s with Scimitar Blended Winglets.

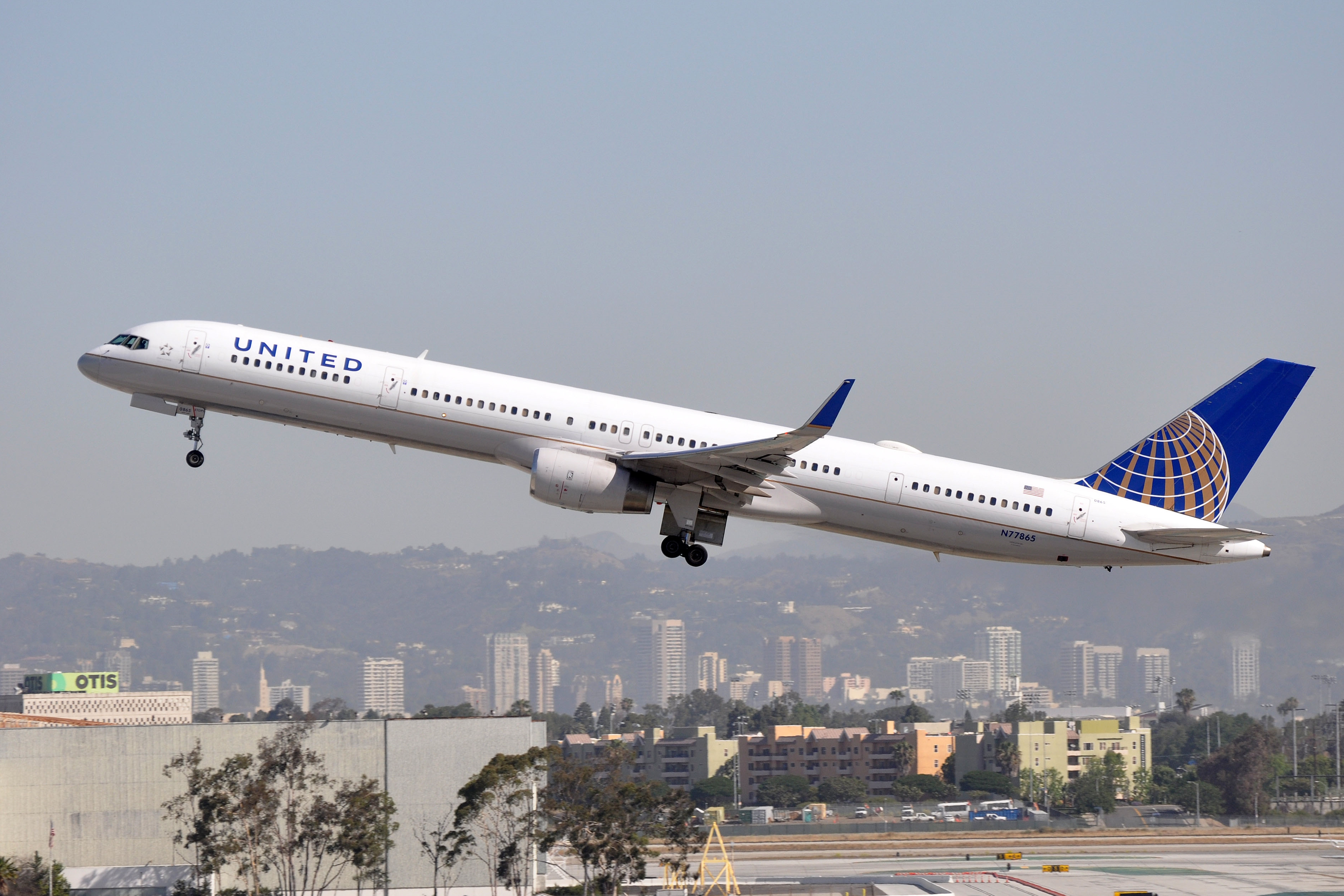
A United Airlines 757-300 taking off from Los Angeles in 2015 with blended winglets, which reduce lift-induced drag and improve fuel efficiency.

Prior to the United-Continental merger in 2010, the 757 remained the only narrow-body aircraft in use by the large fleets of all three U.S. legacy carriers: American Airlines, Delta Air Lines and United Airlines. During this period, the 757's capacity and range capabilities had remained largely unequaled among narrow-body airliners; when selecting replacement aircraft, airlines have had to either downsize to smaller single-aisle aircraft in production with fewer seats and less range such as the 737-900ER and A321, or upsize to the larger, longer-range 787 and A330-200 wide-body jets. The Tupolev Tu-204, a narrow-body twinjet introduced in 1989 with a design similar to the 757's, is offered in a 200-seat version and has seen limited production for mainly Russian customers. Within Boeing, the 215-seat, 3,200-nautical-mile (5,930 km; 3,680 mi) range 737-900ER had been regarded as the closest aircraft in production to the 757-200 after the latter ceased production. The Airbus A321neo LR and XLR variants finally provided a suitable 757-200 replacement on market in terms of range and capacity, and Icelandair and United Airlines have ordered the A321XLR to replace the Boeing 757 on their longer-range routes.

=== Replacement aircraft ===
In February 2015, Boeing marketing Vice President Randy Tinseth stated that re-engining the 757 had been studied but there was no business case to support it. At the March 2015 ISTAT conference, Air Lease Corporation's Steven Udvar-Hazy predicted the 757 replacement would be a more capable, clean-sheet 767-like twin-aisle airplane capable of taking off from 7,000-foot (2,130 m) runways like New York-LaGuardia, and Tinseth was focused on 20% more range and more capacity than the 757-200.

== Design ==
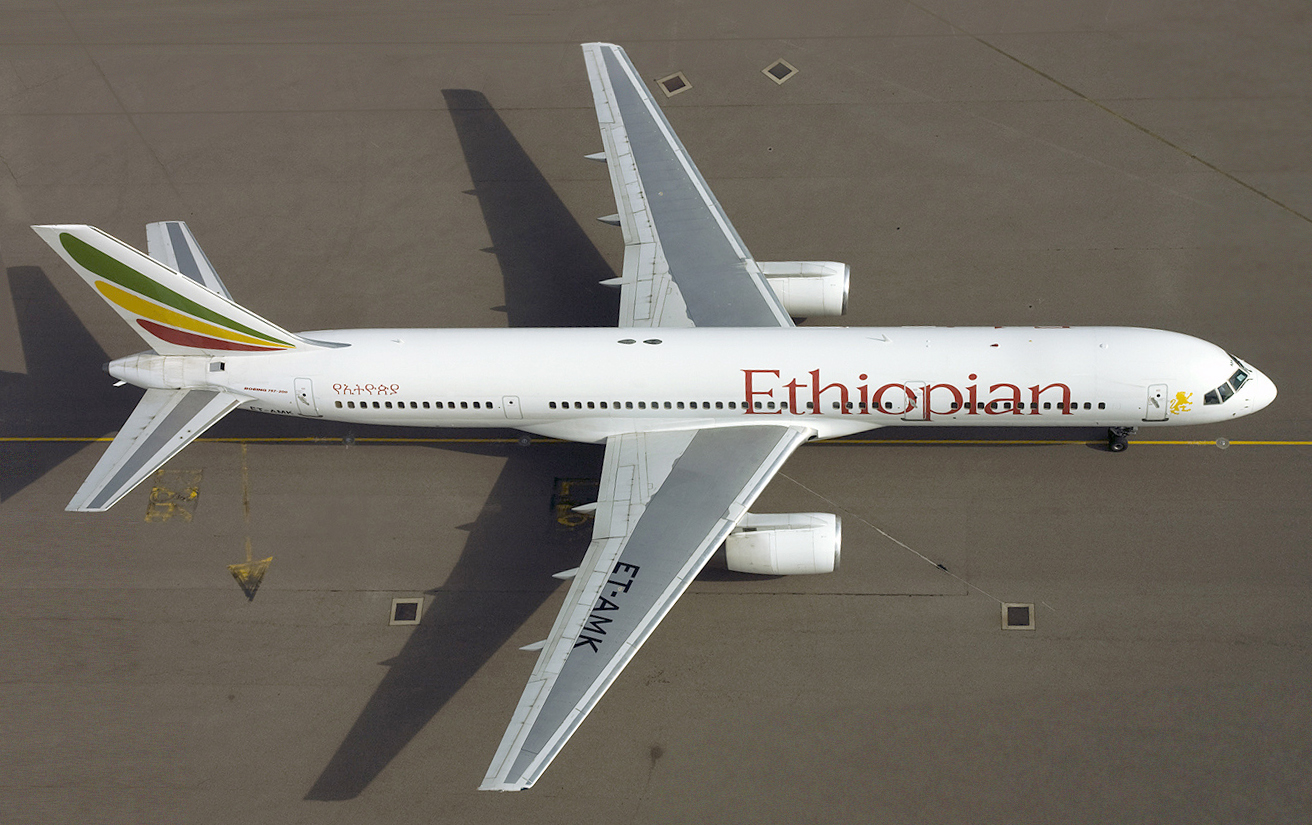
Bird's-eye view of an Ethiopian Airlines 757-200 at London Heathrow Airport in 2012

=== Overview ===
The 757 is a low-wing cantilever monoplane with a conventional tail unit featuring a single fin and rudder. Each wing features a supercritical cross-section and is equipped with five-panel leading edge slats, single- and double-slotted flaps, an outboard aileron, and six spoilers. The wings are largely identical across all 757 variants, swept at 25 degrees, and optimized for a cruising speed of Mach 0.8 (533 mph or 858 km/h). The reduced wing sweep eliminates the need for inboard ailerons, yet incurs little drag penalty on short and medium length routes, during which most of the flight is spent climbing or descending. The airframe further incorporates carbon-fiber reinforced plastic wing surfaces, Kevlar fairings and access panels, plus improved aluminum alloys, which together reduce overall weight by 2,100 pounds (950 kg).

To distribute the aircraft's weight on the ground, the 757 has a retractable tricycle landing gear with four wheels on each main gear and two for the nose gear. The landing gear was purposely designed to be taller than the company's previous narrow-body aircraft to provide ground clearance for stretched models. In 1982, the 757-200 became the first subsonic jetliner to offer longer lasting carbon brakes as a factory option, supplied by Dunlop. The stretched 757-300 features a retractable tailskid on its aft fuselage to prevent damage if the tail section contacts the runway surface during takeoff.

Besides common avionics and computer systems, the 757 shares its auxiliary power unit, electric power systems, flight deck, and hydraulic parts with the 767. Through operational commonality, 757 pilots can obtain a common type rating to fly the 767 and share the same seniority roster with pilots of either aircraft. This reduces costs for airlines that operate both twinjets.

=== Flight systems ===
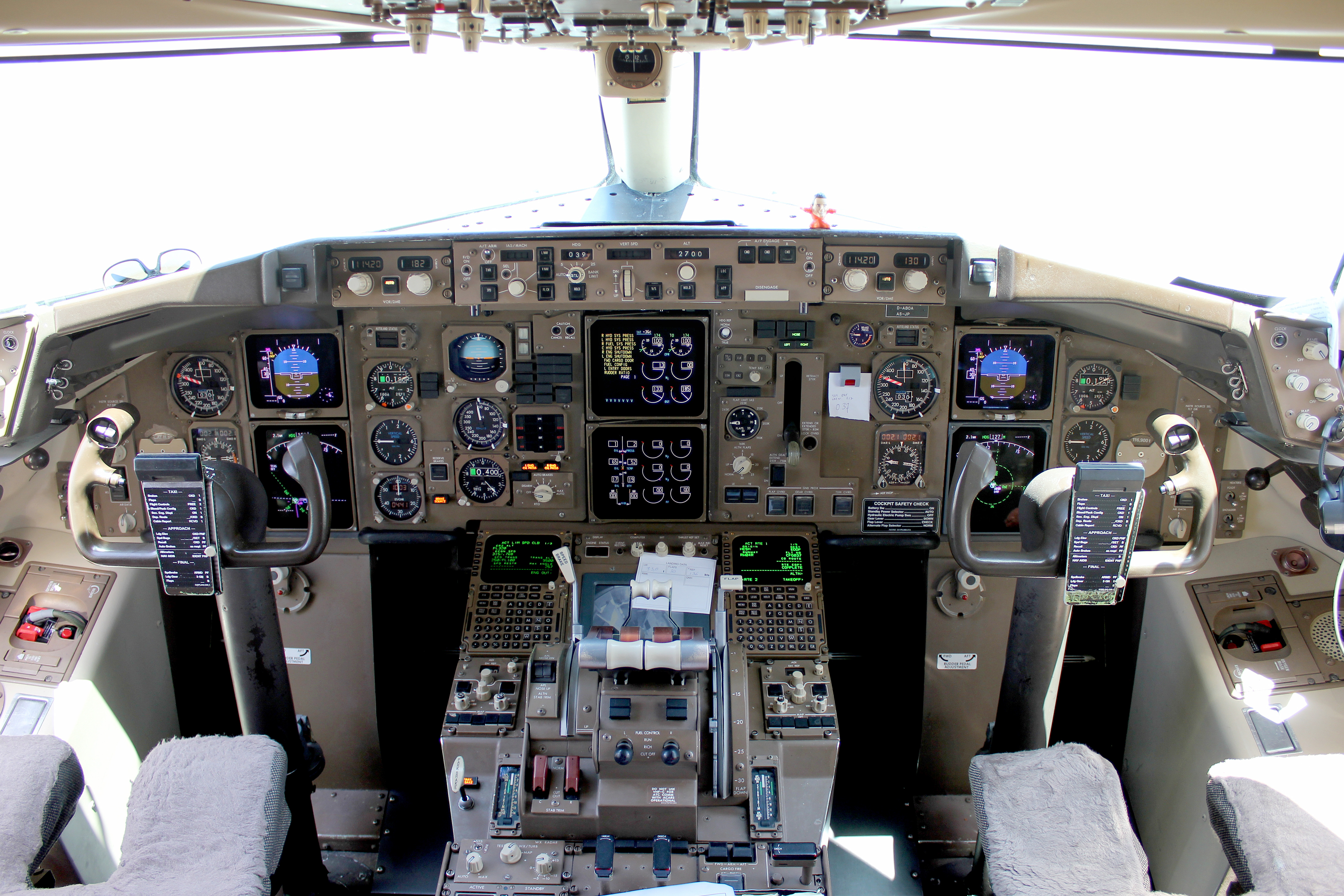
Two-crew cockpit of a Condor 757-300 with CRT displays

The 757's flight deck uses six Rockwell Collins CRT screens to display flight instrumentation, as well as an electronic flight instrument system (EFIS) and an engine indication and crew alerting system (EICAS). These systems allow the pilots to handle monitoring tasks previously performed by the flight engineer. An enhanced flight management system, improved over versions used on early 747s, automates navigation and other functions, while an automatic landing system facilitates CAT IIIb instrument landings in 490 feet (150 m) low visibility conditions. The inertial reference system (IRS) which debuted with the 757-200 was the first to feature laser-light gyros. On the 757-300, the upgraded flight deck features a Honeywell Pegasus flight management computer, enhanced EICAS, and updated software systems.

To accommodate the same flight deck design as the 767, the 757 has a more rounded nose section than previous narrow-body aircraft. The resulting space has unobstructed panel visibility and room for an observer seat. Similar pilot viewing angles as the 767 result from a downward sloped cockpit floor and the same forward cockpit windows.

Three independent hydraulic systems are installed on the 757, one powered by each engine, and the third using electric pumps. A ram air turbine (RAT) is fitted to provide power for essential controls in the event of an emergency. A basic form of fly-by-wire facilitates spoiler operation, utilizing electric signaling instead of traditional control cables. The fly-by-wire system, shared with the 767, reduces weight and provides for the independent operation of individual spoilers. When equipped for extended-range operations, the 757 features a backup hydraulic motor generator and an additional cooling fan in the aircraft's electronics bay. The state-of-the-art flight deck design and advanced cockpit features led to pilots nicknaming the aircraft the "Atari Ferrari".

=== Interior ===
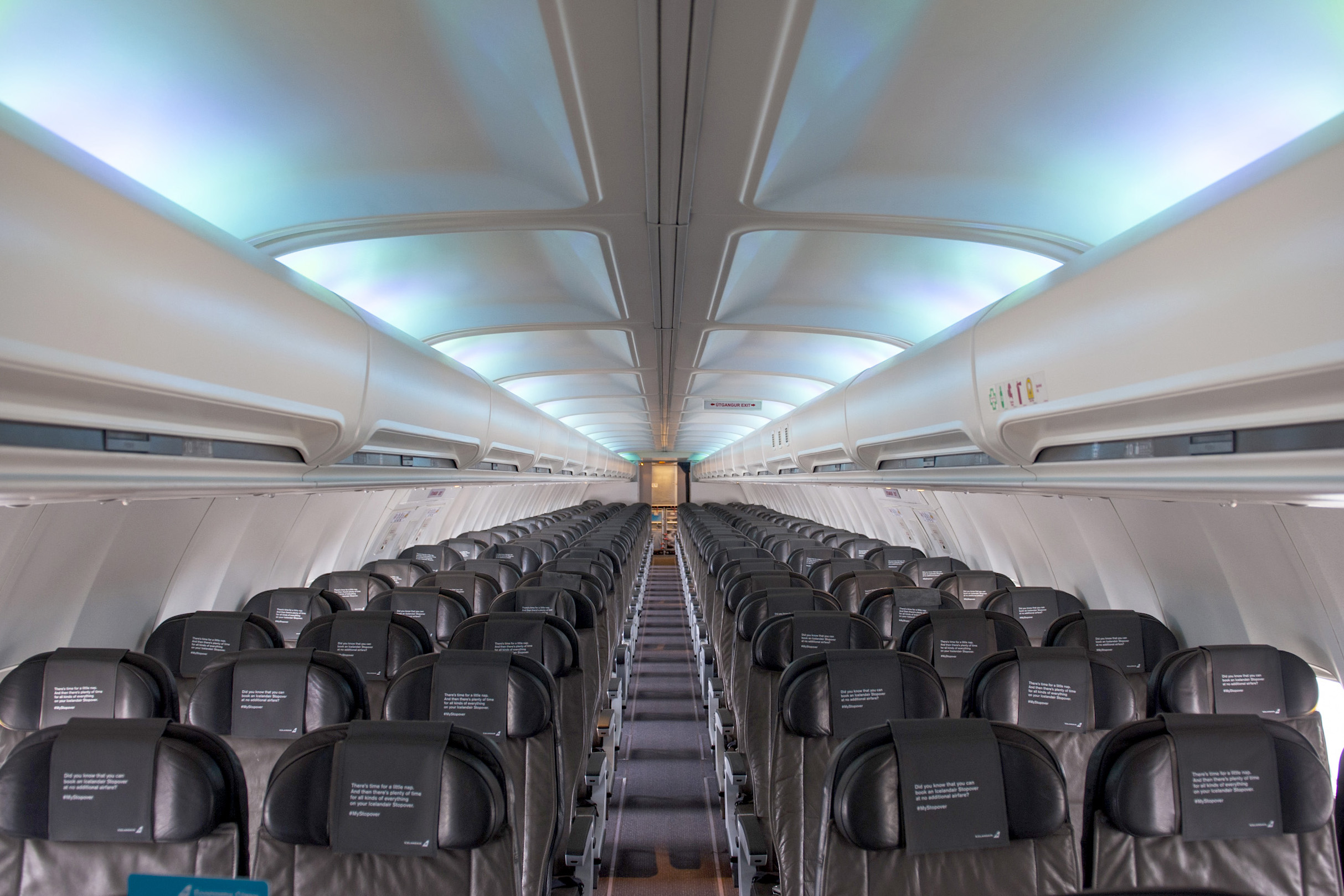
Icelandair 757-200 with original cabin design, updated lighting, and six-abreast seating

The 757 interior allows seat arrangements of up to six per row with a single center aisle. Originally optimized for flights averaging two hours, the 757 features interior lighting and cabin architecture designs aimed at a more spacious impression. As on the 767, garment-bag-length overhead bins and a rear economy-class galley are standard equipment. The bins have twice the capacity as those on the preceding 727. To save weight, honeycomb sandwich is used for interior paneling and bins. Unlike previous evacuation slide designs which are not equipped for water landings, the 757's main exits feature combination slide rafts similar to those found on the 747. In the 1980s, Boeing altered the interior designs of its other narrow-body aircraft to be similar to that of the 757.

In 1998, the 757-300 debuted a redesigned interior derived from the Next Generation 737 and 777, including sculptured ceiling panels, indirect lighting, and larger overhead bins with an optional continuous handrail built into their base for the entire cabin length. Centerline storage containers mounted in the aisle ceiling for additional escape rafts and other emergency equipment were also added. The 757-300's interior later became an option on all new 757-200s. In 2000, with wheeled carry-on baggage becoming more popular, Delta Air Lines began installing overhead bin extensions on their 757-200s to provide additional storage space, and American Airlines did the same in 2001. The second interior upgrades based on Boeing Sky Interior, which provide even larger bins and updated ceiling panels and lighting divided from the design from Boeing 787, were introduced in 2011.

== Variants ==
The 757 was produced in standard and stretched lengths. The original 757-200 debuted as a passenger model, and was subsequently developed into the 757-200PF and 757-200SF cargo models, as well as the convertible 757-200M variant. The stretched 757-300 was only available as a passenger model. When referring to different versions, Boeing, and airlines are known to collapse the model number (757) and the variant designator (e.g. -200 or -300) into a truncated form (e.g. "752" or "753"). The International Civil Aviation Organization (ICAO) classifies all variants based on the 757-200 under the code "B752", and the 757-300 is referred to as "B753" for air traffic control purposes.

=== 757-200 ===
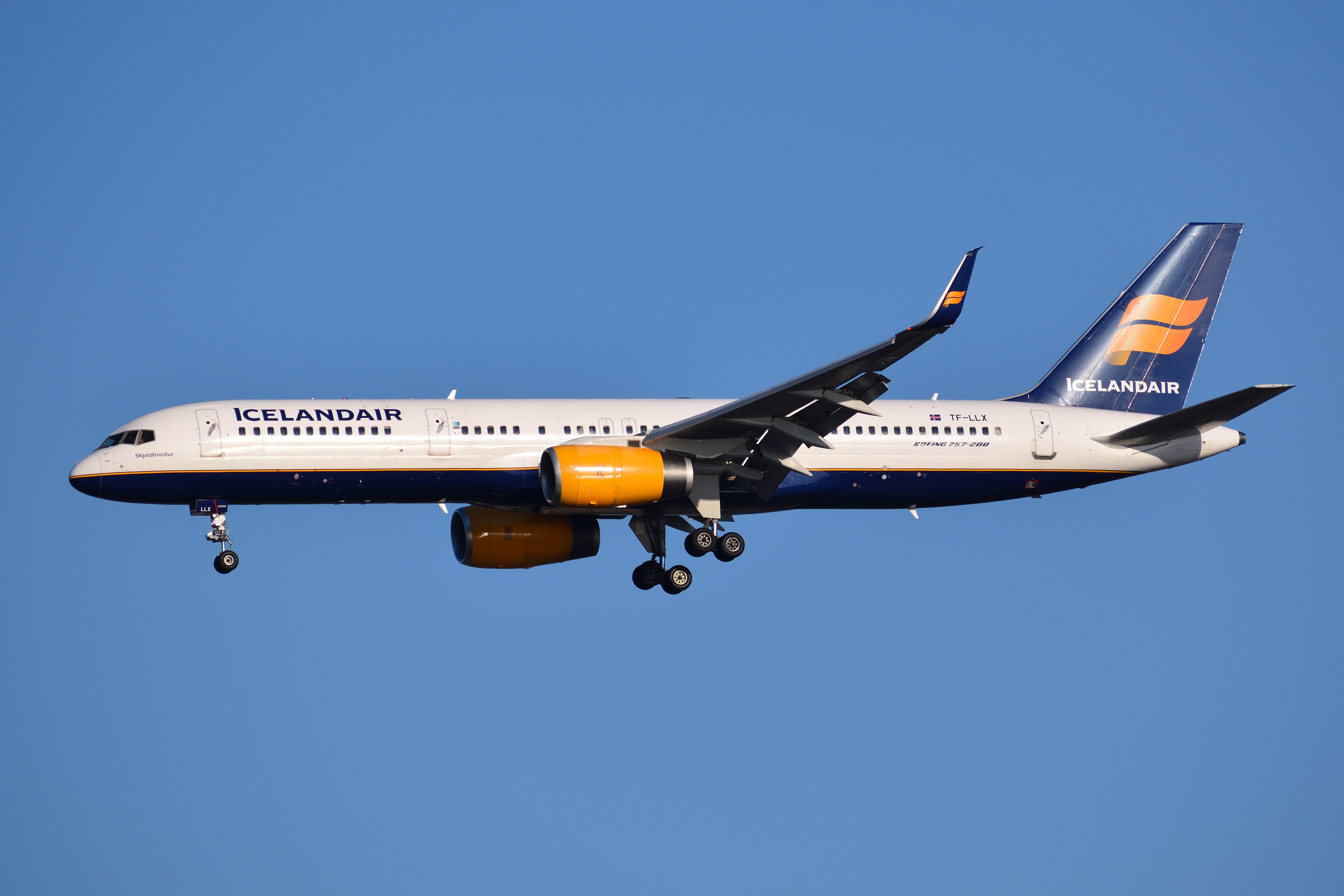
An Icelandair 757-200 in 2020 with Scimitar Blended Winglets

The 757-200, the original version of the aircraft, entered service with Eastern Air Lines in 1983. The type was produced with two different exit configurations, both with three standard cabin doors per side: the baseline version has a fourth, smaller cabin door on each side aft of the wings, and is certified for a maximum capacity of 239, while the alternate version has a pair of over-the-wing emergency exits on each side, and can seat a maximum of 224. The 757-200 was offered with a MTOW of up to 255,000 lb (116,000 kg); some airlines and publications have referred to higher gross weight versions with ETOPS certification as "757-200ER", but this designation is not used by the manufacturer. Similarly, versions with winglets are sometimes called "757-200W" or "757-200WL". The first engine to power the 757-200, the Rolls-Royce RB211-535C, was succeeded by the upgraded RB211-535E4 in October 1984. Other engines used include the Rolls-Royce RB211-535E4B, along with the Pratt & Whitney PW2000-37/40/43. Its range with full payload is 3,850 nautical miles (7,130 km; 4,430 mi).

Although designed for short and medium length routes, the 757-200 has since been used in a variety of roles ranging from high-frequency shuttle services to transatlantic routes. In 1992, after gaining ETOPS approval, American Trans Air launched 757-200 transpacific services between Tucson and Honolulu. Since the turn of the century, mainline U.S. carriers have increasingly deployed the type on transatlantic routes to Europe, and particularly to smaller cities where passenger volumes are insufficient for wide-body aircraft. Production for the 757-200 totaled 913 aircraft, making the type by far the most popular 757 model. At over 4,000 nautical miles (7,400 km; 4,600 mi), as of February 2015, the longest commercial route served by a 757 is United Airlines' Newark to Berlin flight; the aircraft assigned to this route cannot fly with full payload. United's 757s assigned to transatlantic routes are fitted with 169 seats. In July 2018, 611 of the 757-200 versions were in service.

=== 757-200PF ===
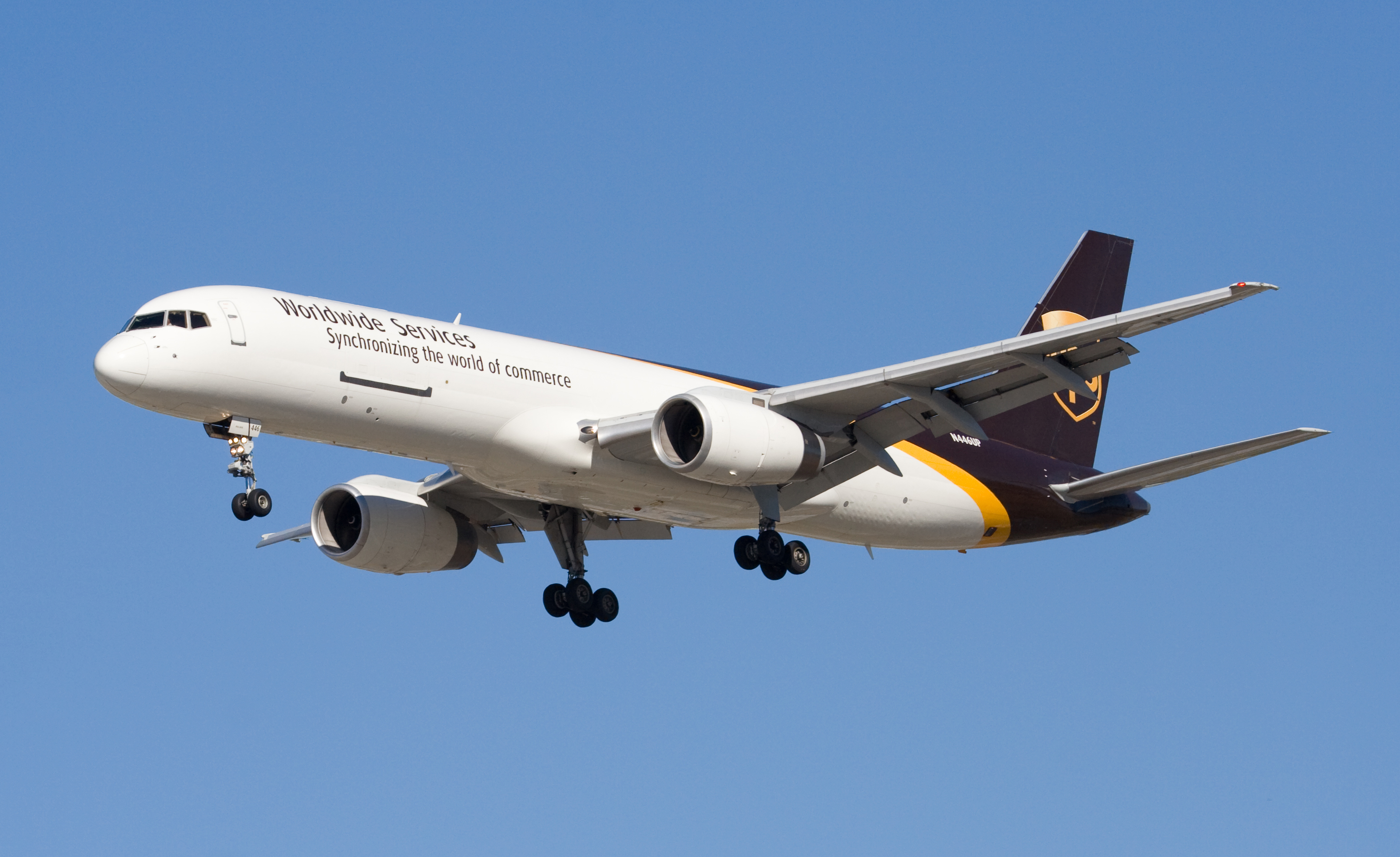
A UPS 757-200PF in 2007

The 757-200PF, the production cargo version of the 757-200, entered service with UPS Airlines in 1987. Targeted at the overnight package delivery market, the freighter can carry up to 15 ULD containers or pallets on its main deck, for a volume of up to 6,600 cu ft (190 m^{3}), while its two lower holds can carry up to 1,830 cu ft (52 m^{3}) of bulk cargo. The maximum revenue payload capability is 87,700 lb (39,800 kg) including container weight. The 757-200PF is specified with a MTOW of 255,000 lb (116,000 kg) for maximal range performance; when fully loaded, the aircraft can fly up to 3,150 nautical miles (5,830 km; 3,620 mi). Power is provided by RB211-535E4B engines from Rolls-Royce, or PW2037 and PW2040 engines from Pratt & Whitney.

The freighter features a large, upward-opening main deck cargo door on its forward port-side fuselage. Next to this large cargo door is an exit door used by the pilots. All other emergency exits are omitted, and cabin windows and passenger amenities are not available. The main-deck cargo hold has a smooth fiberglass lining, and a fixed rigid barrier with a sliding access door serves as a restraint wall next to the flight deck. Both lower holds can be equipped with a telescoping baggage system to load custom-fitted cargo modules. When equipped for extended-range operations, UPS's 757-200PFs feature an upgraded auxiliary power unit, additional cargo bay fire suppression equipment, enhanced avionics, and an optional supplemental fuel tank in the aft lower hold. Production for the 757-200PF totaled 80 aircraft.

=== 757-200M/CB ===
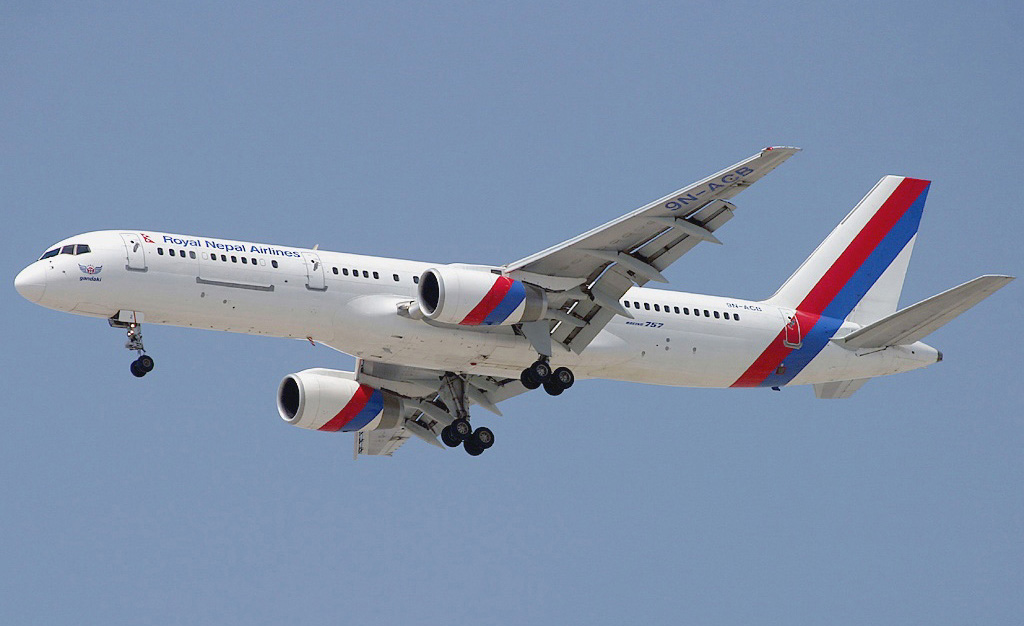
Nepal Airlines' sole 757-200M in 2012

The 757-200M, a convertible version capable of carrying cargo and passengers on its main deck, entered service with Royal Nepal Airlines in 1988. Also known as the 757-200CB (Combi), the type retains the passenger windows and cabin doors of the 757-200, while adding a forward port-side cargo door in the manner of the 757-200PF. Kathmandu-based Royal Nepal Airlines, later renamed Nepal Airlines, included the convertible model as part of an order for two 757s in 1986.

Nepal Airlines ordered the 757-200M to fulfill a requirement for an aircraft that could carry mixed passenger and freight loads, and operate out of Tribhuvan International Airport, with its 4,400 ft (1,300 m) elevation, in the foothills of the Himalayas. Patterned after convertible variants of the 737 and 747, the 757-200M can carry two to four cargo pallets on its main deck, along with 123 to 148 passengers in the remaining cabin space. Nepal Airlines' 757-200M, which features Rolls-Royce RB211-535E4 engines and an increased MTOW of 240,000 lb (110,000 kg), was the only production example ordered. When cargo is carried on the main deck, the crew must include an additional dedicated, trained cargo firefighter.

In October 2010, Pemco World Air Services and Precision Conversions launched aftermarket conversion programs to modify 757-200s into 757 Combi aircraft. Vision Technologies Systems launched a similar program in December 2011. All three aftermarket conversions modify the forward portion of the aircraft to provide room for up to ten cargo pallets, while leaving the remaining space to fit around 45 to 58 passenger seats. This configuration is targeted at commercial charter flights which transport heavy equipment and personnel simultaneously. Customers for converted 757 Combi aircraft include the Air Transport Services Group, National Airlines, and North American Airlines.

=== 757-300 ===
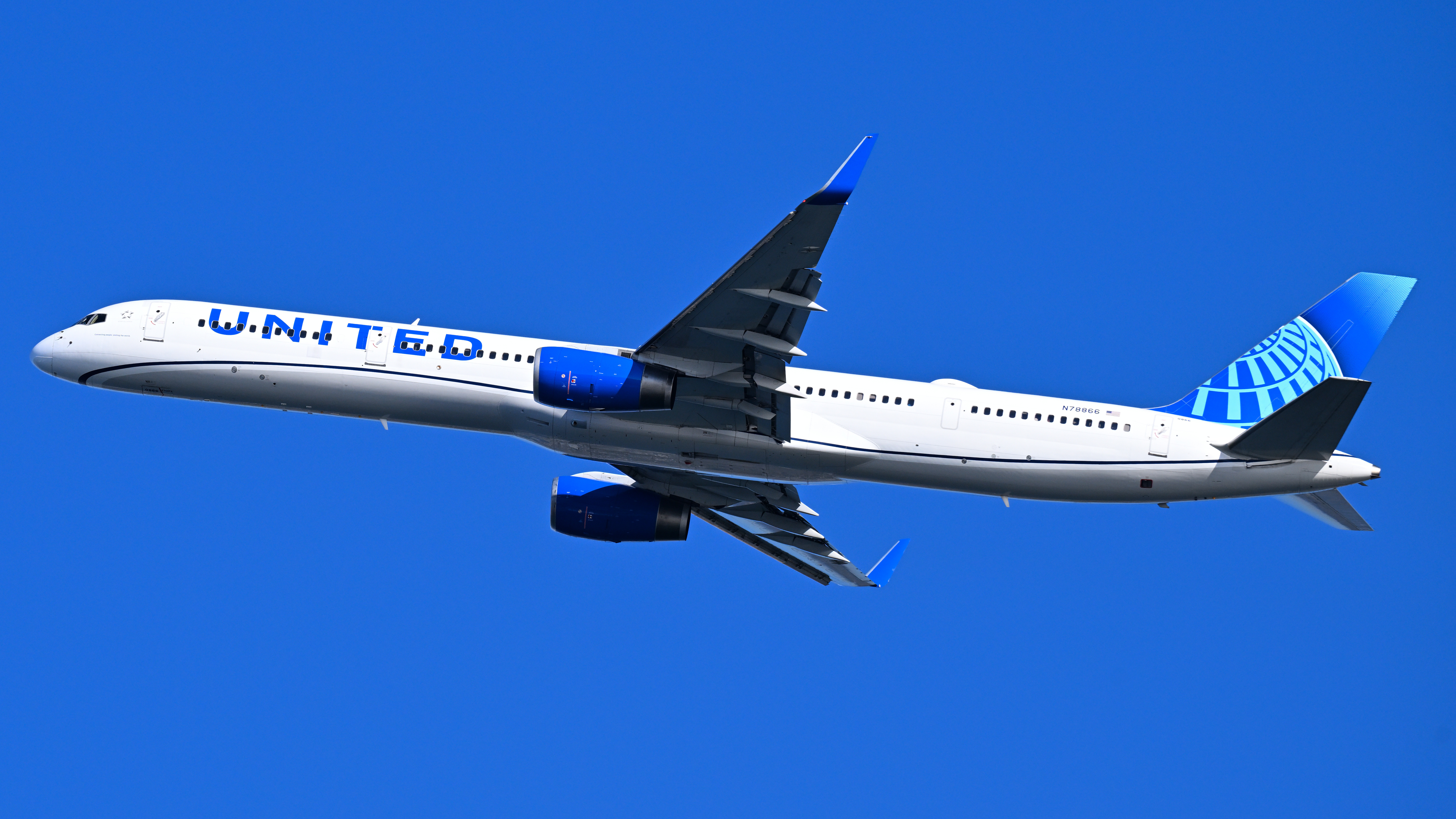
United Airlines 757-300 in 2025

The 757-300, the stretched and longest version of the Boeing 757 variants, entered service with Condor in 1999. With a length of 178.7 ft (54.5 m), the type is the longest single-aisle twinjet ever built, coming in just shorter than the 187.4 ft (57.1 m) quad-jet DC-8-61/63. Designed to serve the charter airline market and provide a low-cost replacement for the 767-200, the 757-300 shares the basic design of the original 757, while extending the fuselage forward and aft of the wings. Six standard cabin doors, two smaller cabin doors behind the wings, plus a pair of over-the-wing emergency exits on each side, enable the 757-300 to have a maximum certified capacity of 295 passengers. A higher MTOW of 272,500 lb (123,600 kg) is specified, while fuel capacity remains unchanged; as a result, the stretched variant offers a maximum range of 3,395 nautical miles (6,288 km; 3,907 mi). Engines used on the type include the RB211-535E4B from Rolls-Royce and the PW2043 from Pratt & Whitney. Due to its greater length, the 757-300 features a retractable tailskid on its aft fuselage to avoid tailstrikes.

Condor ordered the stretched 757 to replace its McDonnell Douglas DC-10s and serve as low-cost, high-density transportation to holiday destinations such as the Canary Islands. Because tests showed that boarding the 757-300 could take up to eight minutes longer than the 757-200, Boeing and Condor developed zone-based boarding procedures to expedite loading and unloading times for the lengthened aircraft. The 757-300 has been operated by mainline carriers Continental Airlines (now part of United Airlines as of 2010), Northwest Airlines (now part of Delta Air Lines as of 2008), and Icelandair; other operators have included American Trans Air (the first North American operator), Arkia Israel Airlines, along with charter carriers Condor and Thomas Cook Airlines as of 2014. Production for the 757-300 totaled 55 aircraft. All 55 were in service in July 2018.

==== 757-200SF/PCF (conversion) ====
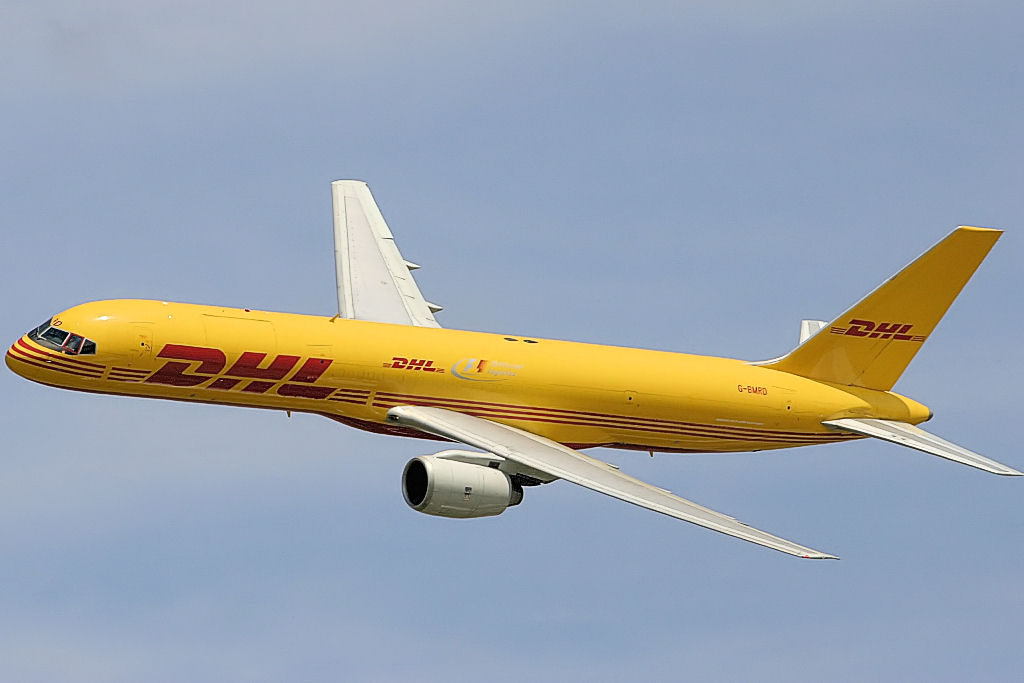
A 757-200SF of launch customer DHL Aviation in 2008

The 757-200SF is a passenger to freighter conversion developed by Boeing following an order for 34 aircraft plus 10 options by DHL. It entered service in 2001 with the initial ex-British Airways aircraft converted at Boeing's Wichita site and subsequent blocks of aircraft were converted by Israel Aerospace Industries and ST Aerospace Services. Modifications included the removal of passenger amenities, main deck structural reinforcement, addition of cargo handling flooring, and the installation of a 757-200PF port-side cargo door in the forward fuselage. The forward two entry doors and lobby area of the passenger aircraft are retained, resulting in a main deck cargo capacity of 14 full sized pallets and one smaller LD3. Environmental controls can be fitted for animal cargo such as racehorses, and rear exits and window pairs are retained on some aircraft to facilitate animal handlers. ST Aerospace continued to offer 14, 14.5 and 15 Unit load device variants of the SF in 2020.

In September 2006, FedEx Express announced a US$2.6 billion (~$3.99 billion in 2025) plan to acquire over 80 converted 757 freighters to replace its 727 fleet, citing a 25% reduction in operating cost along with noise benefits.

The 757-200PCF is another passenger to freighter conversion developed by Precision Conversions, and was certificated in 2005. In 2019, the conversion was reported to cost $5 million (~$6.2 million in 2025) per aircraft, and has 15 pallet positions just like the SF. The forward passenger doors are removed and replaced with a small crew door, similar to the -200PF. As of April 2020, a total of 120 757-200PCFs had been delivered.

=== Government, military, and corporate ===
Government, military, and private customers have acquired the 757 for uses ranging from aeronautical testing and research to cargo and VIP transport. The 757-200, the most widely ordered version of the aircraft, has formed the basis for these applications. The first government operator of the 757 was the Mexican Air Force, which took delivery of a VIP-configured 757-200 in November 1987.

- Airborne Research Integrated Experiments System (ARIES) – A NASA platform for air safety and operational research, was created in 1999 using the second production 757. The aircraft originally flew in the 757 flight test program before entering service with Eastern Air Lines. After NASA purchased the aircraft in 1994 to replace its 737-100 testbed, it was initially used to evaluate a hybrid laminar flow control system, avionics systems for the proposed Northrop YF-23 jet fighter, and the 777's fly-by-wire control system. Equipped with a flight deck research station, on-board laboratories, and two experimental flight decks, ARIES was used for evaluating weather information and landing approach systems, as well as runway friction tests. ARIES went into storage in 2006.

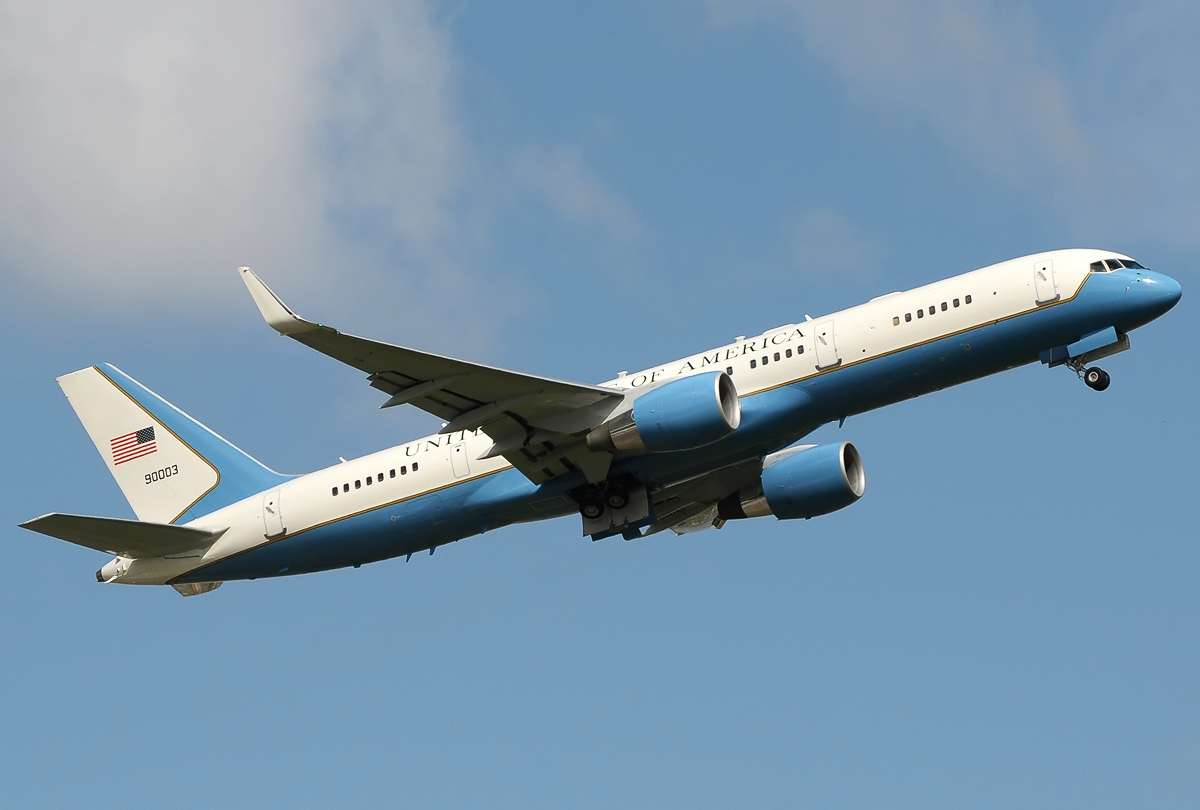
The C-32A, a variant of the 757, is the usual air transportation for the Vice President of the United States.

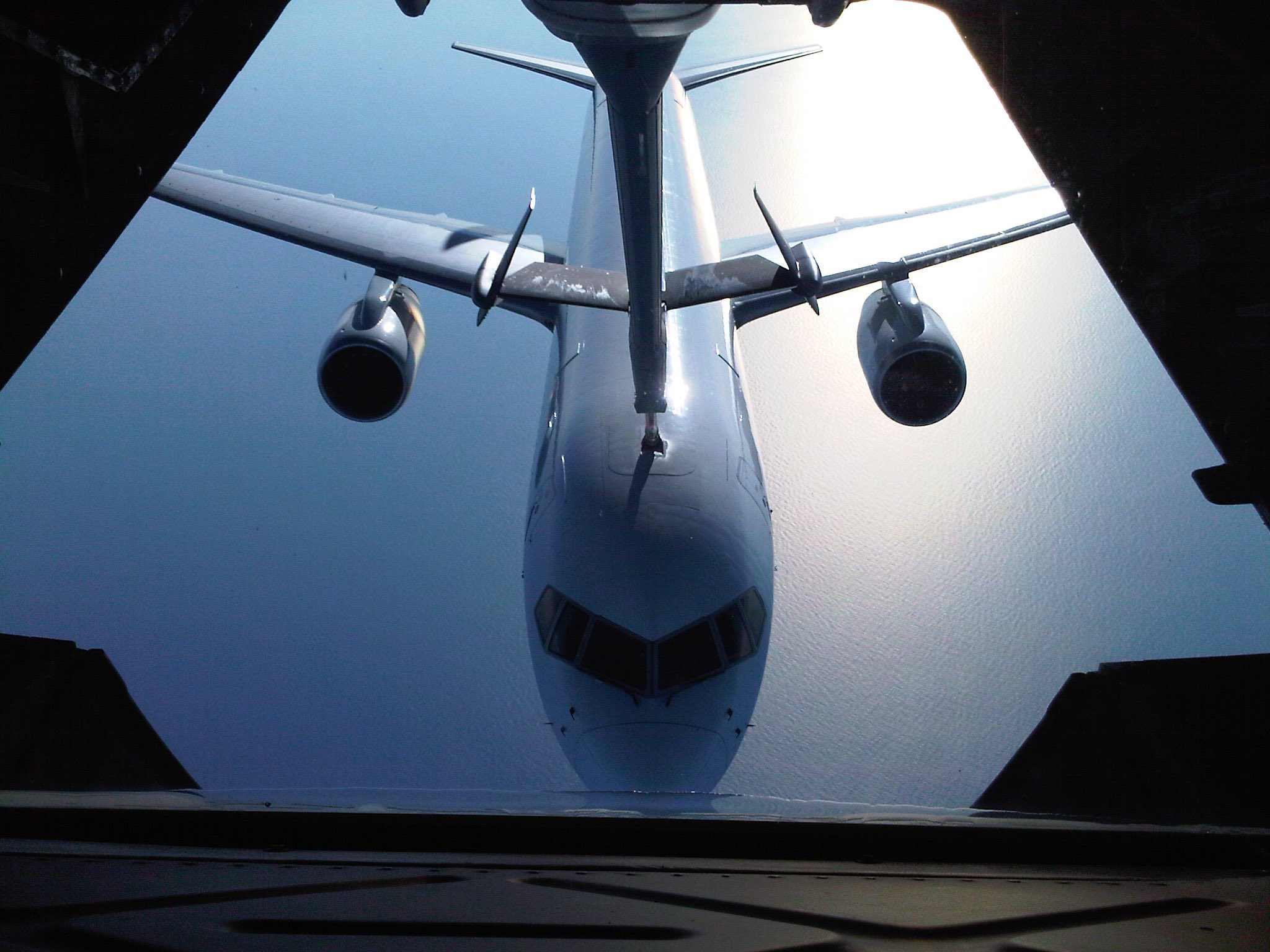
The C-32B is the only 757 known to be able to conduct aerial refueling.

- C-32 – The United States Air Force operates six 757-200s under the designation C-32. Four are VIP-configured C-32A variants, whose mission is primarily transport of the Vice President of the United States, First Lady, and Secretary of State. The C-32As are powered by the Pratt & Whitney PW2000, and outfitted with a communication center, conference room, seating area, and private living quarters. The USAF also operates two 45-seat Rolls-Royce powered 757-200 aircraft, designated C-32B Gatekeeper, which provides airlift to special operations units and global emergency response teams. The C-32Bs are outfitted for any contingency, with an advanced communications suite, aerial refueling capabilities, extended fuel tanks, and an internal airstair. The C-32As are painted in the Raymond Loewy-designed blue and white livery used on most Special Air Mission aircraft, while the C-32Bs are painted gloss white with minimal identification markings. The first C-32s were acquired in 1998 and replaced C-137 Stratoliner transports.

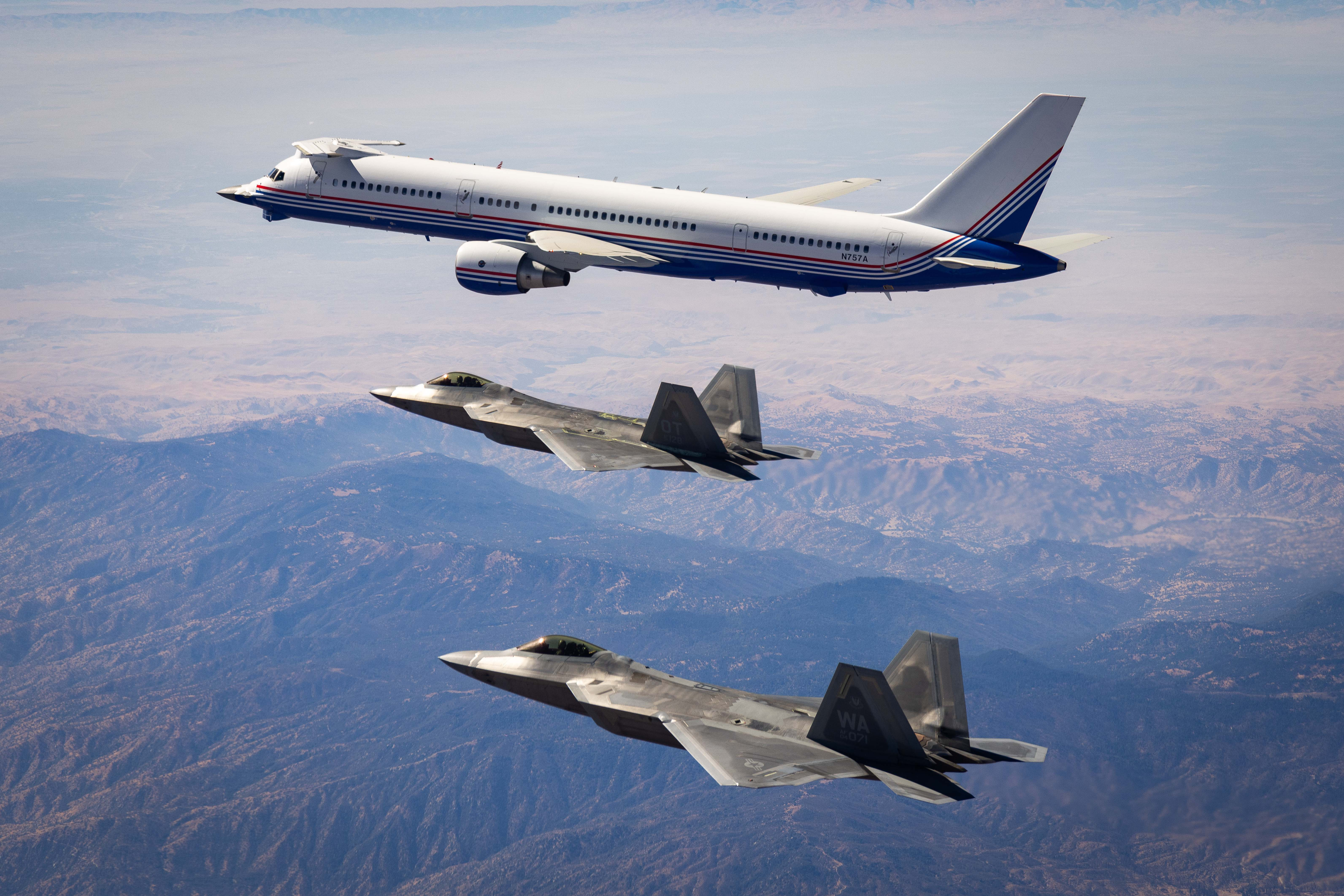
F-22s fly in formation with the Flying Test Bed

- F-22 Flying Testbed – The first 757 built was used in 1998 as a testbed for Lockheed Martin F-22 Raptor avionics and sensor integration. The Boeing-owned aircraft was fitted with a canard above its cockpit to simulate the jet fighter's wing sensor layout, along with a forward F-22 fuselage section with radar and other systems, and a 30-seat laboratory with communication, electronic warfare, identification, and navigation sensors.
- Krueger flap and Natural Laminar Flow Insect Mitigation Test Program – As part of their ecoDemonstrator program, Boeing commenced a series of test flights on March 17, 2015, with a modified Boeing 757, incorporating new wing-leading-edge sections and an actively blown vertical tail. The left wing was modified to include a 6.7 m-span glove section supporting a variable-camber Krueger flap to be deployed during landing which protrudes just ahead of the leading edge. Although Krueger flaps have been tried before as insect-mitigation screens, previous designs caused additional drag; the newer design is variable-camber and designed to retract as seamlessly as possible into the lower wing surface. Increasing the use of natural laminar flow (NLF) on an aircraft wing has the potential to improve fuel burn by as much as 15%, but even small contaminants from insect remains will trip the flow from laminar to turbulent, destroying the performance benefit. The test flights have been supported by the European airline group TUI AG and conducted jointly with NASA as part of the agency's Environmentally Responsible Aviation (ERA) program. While the left wing tests the Krueger flaps, the right wing is being used to test coatings that prevent insects from adhering to the wing.
- Active Flow Control System – On one aircraft Boeing has mounted 31 active flow jets mounted ahead of the rudder's leading edge. They receive air from the Auxiliary Power Unit (APU). Their purpose is to recover air flow that has separated from the rudder and redirect it to the rudder so that the rudder regains effectiveness, even at high deflection angles. The air exiting the APU is very hot, at 380 °F (193 °C), and is cooled by a heat exchanger mounted under the aft fuselage, which is connected to the ducts running along the front and back of the stabilizer's spars. This ensures an even air supply at all times.

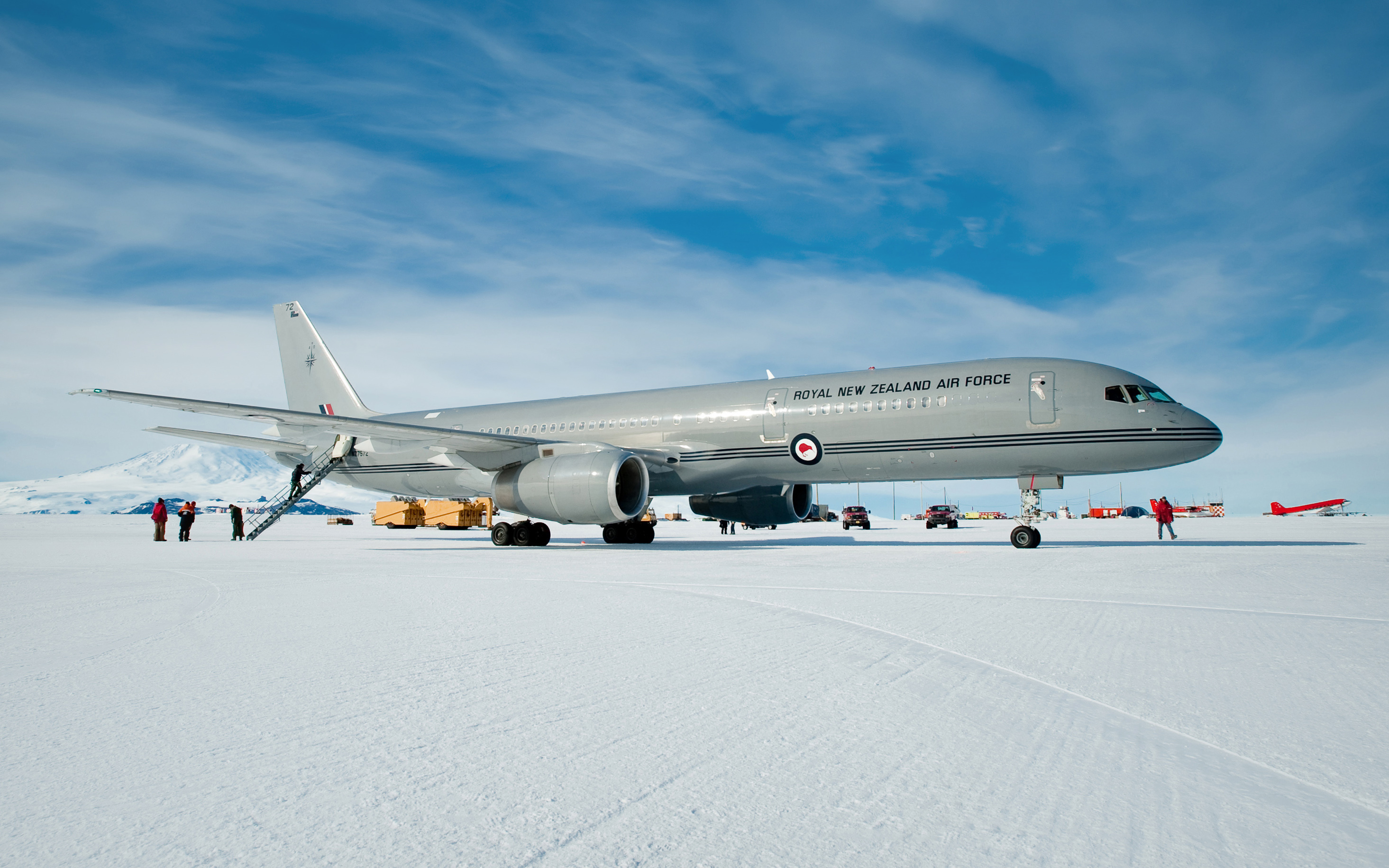
In 2009, the Royal New Zealand Air Force flew one of its 757 Combis to Antarctica for the first time.

- Royal New Zealand Air Force 757 Combi – The Royal New Zealand Air Force (RNZAF) operates two 757s converted to 757-200M standard by ST Aerospace Services for delivering equipment, medical evacuation, troop movements, and VIP transport. A cargo door, upgraded auxiliary power unit, enhanced communications systems, and retractable airstairs are fitted. The two aircraft, which replaced two 727-100QCs, have carried the Prime Minister of New Zealand, and flown to the ice-covered Pegasus Field near New Zealand's Scott Base in McMurdo Sound, Antarctica.
- VIP transport – The 757-200 serves as VIP transports for the President of Argentina under the Presidential Air Group serial Tango 01 and for the President of Mexico under the Mexican Air Force call sign TP01 or Transporte Presidencial 1. A Royal Brunei Airlines 757-200 was used by the Sultan of Brunei in the 1980s before being sold to the Government of Kazakhstan in 1995. The royal family of Saudi Arabia uses a 757-200 as a flying hospital. Microsoft co-founder Paul Allen used a private 757 from 2005 until 2011; the aircraft was then sold to Donald Trump and became known as "Trump Force One" during his 2016 U.S. presidential campaign.
- Excalibur – A testbed for the British BAE Systems Tempest's avionics and sensors. The aircraft is to be converted from a civilian airliner by Leonardo UK and 2Excel.

=== Comparison ===
Below is a list of major differences between the 757 variants.

Variant	757-200	757-200F	757-300
2-class seating	200 (12F+188Y)	5 max	243 (12F+231Y)
1-class seating	219–239 max (Note: The maximum depends on the type of exit doors equipped.)	5 max	275–295 max
Cargo volume	1,670 cu ft (47.3 m^{3})	6,600 cu ft (187 m^{3})	2,370 cu ft (61.7 m^{3})
Length	155 ft 3 in (47.3 m)		178 ft 7 in (54.4 m)
MTOW	255,000 lb (115,660 kg)		273,000 lb (123,830 kg)
Max. Payload	57,160 lb (25,920 kg)	84,420 lb (38,290 kg)	68,140 lb (30,910 kg)
OEW	128,840 lb (58,440 kg)	115,580 lb (52,430 kg)	141,860 lb (64,340 kg)
Fuel capacity	11,489 US gal (43,490 L)	11,276 US gal (42,680 L)	11,466 US gal (43,400 L)
Range	3,915 nmi (7,250 km; 4,505 mi) (Note: 200 passengers)	2,935 nmi (5,435 km; 3,378 mi) (Note: 72,210 lb (32,755 kg) payload)	3,400 nmi (6,295 km; 3,900 mi) (Note: 243 passengers)
Takeoff (Note: MTOW, sea level, 86 °F (30 °C), RB211-535E4B engines)	6,800 ft (2,070 m)	6,900 ft (2,103 m)	8,550 ft (2,605 m)
Ceiling	42,650 ft (13,000 m)		
Engines (×2)	40,200–43,500 lbf (179–193 kN) Rolls-Royce RB211-535-E4(B); 36,600–42,600 lbf (163–189 kN) Pratt & Whitney PW2000-37/40/43		

== Operators ==
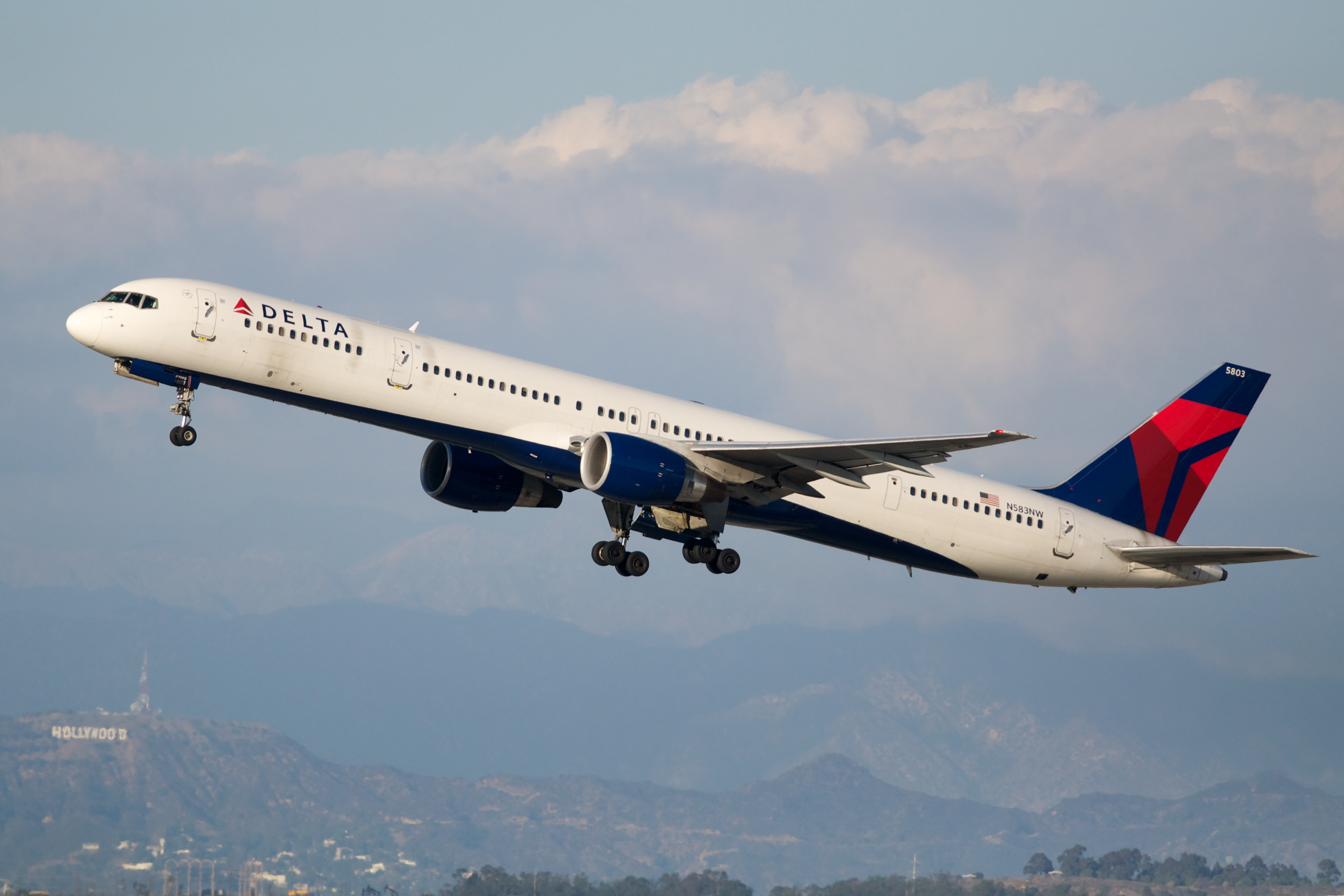
Delta is the largest 757 operator as of 2018, with a 757-300 shown here departing Los Angeles in 2011.

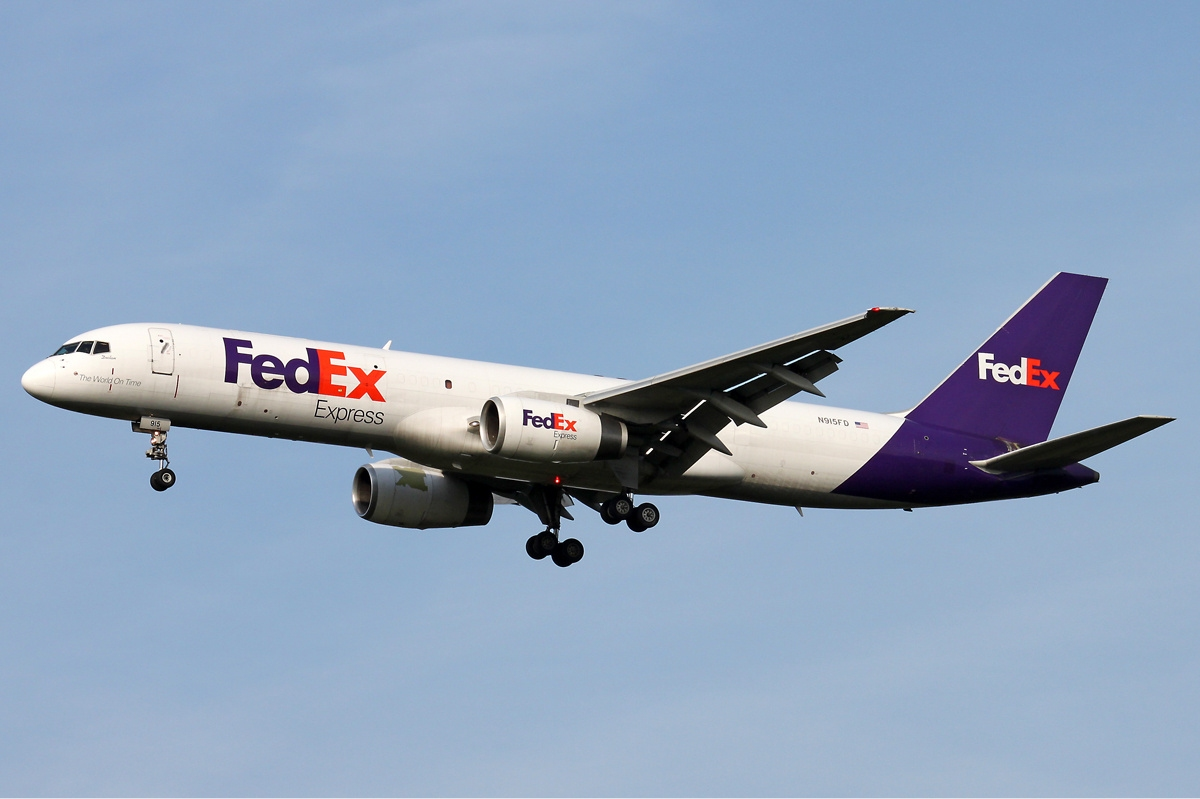
FedEx Express is the largest freighter operator as of 2018, with a 757-200SF shown here in 2011

As of 2018, the largest 757 operators were Delta Air Lines, FedEx Express and United Airlines. As of February 2025, Delta Air Lines operates 104 757s, FedEx operates 92 757 freighters, and United operates 61 757s.

American Airlines formerly operated a substantial 757 fleet of 142 aircraft, which was the largest until 2007, when the carrier retired Pratt & Whitney PW2000-powered models originating from its TWA acquisition to have an all Rolls-Royce RB211-powered 757 fleet. American retired the last of its 757s in 2020.

In addition to FedEx, UPS and DHL were substantial operators of 757 freighters as of 2018. UPS Airlines operated a further 75 of the type, with DHL Aviation and its affiliated companies, DHL Air UK, DHL Latin America, European Air Transport Leipzig, and Blue Dart Aviation, combined operating 35 cargo 757s of various types in 2018.

Joint launch customer British Airways operated the 757-200 for 27 years before retiring the type in November 2010. To celebrate the fleet's retirement, the airline unveiled one of its last three 757-200s in a retro style livery on October 4, 2010, matching the color scheme that it introduced the aircraft into service with in 1983. Subsequently, the type remained in operation with the company's subsidiary, OpenSkies.

Over the duration of the program, 1,050 Boeing 757s were built with 1,049 aircraft delivered. The prototype 757 remained with the manufacturer for testing purposes. In August 2018, a total of 611 Boeing 757 aircraft of all variants were in commercial service with operators Delta Air Lines (127), FedEx Express (111), UPS Airlines (75), United Airlines (77), Icelandair (26) and others with fewer aircraft of the type.

=== Orders and deliveries ===
Year	Total	2005	2004	2003	2002	2001	2000	1999	1998	1997	1996	1995	1994	1993	1992
Orders	1,049	0	0	7	0	37	43	18	50	44	59	13	12	33	35
Deliveries	1,049	2	11	14	29	45	45	67	54	46	42	43	69	71	99

Year	1991	1990	1989	1988	1987	1986	1985	1984	1983	1982	1981	1980	1979	1978
Orders	50	95	166	148	46	13	45	2	26	2	3	64	0	38
Deliveries	80	77	51	48	40	35	36	18	25	2	0	0	0	0

Boeing 757 orders and deliveries (cumulative, by year):

Orders Deliveries — Data from Boeing, through to the end of production

=== Model summary ===
Model series	ICAO code	Orders	Deliveries
757-200	B752	913	913
757-200M	B752	1	1
757-200PF	B752	80	80
757-300	B753	55	55
Total		1,049	1,049

- Data from Boeing, through the end of production

== Accidents and incidents ==
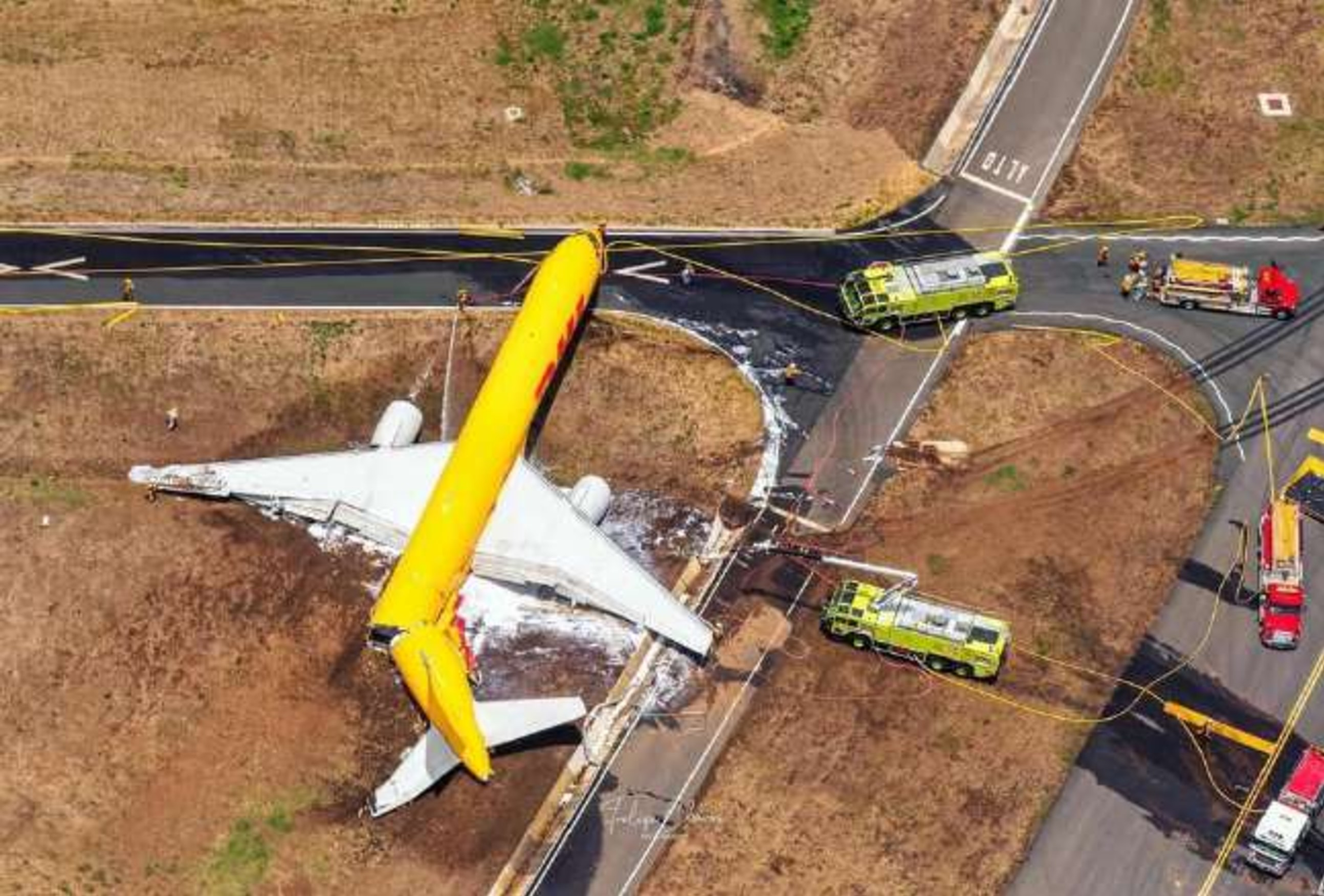
Wreckage of DHL Flight 7216 in 2022

As of November 2023, the 757 has been involved in 47 aviation occurrences, including ten hull-loss accidents out of a total of 13 hull-losses. Nine incidents and 12 hijackings have resulted in a total of 575 occupant fatalities.

- October 2, 1990 – CAAC Flight 3523 was involved in the 1990 Guangzhou Baiyun airport collisions, when Xiamen Airlines Flight 8301, a hijacked Boeing 737-200, stuck the aircraft as well as China Southwest Airlines Flight 4305, a parked Boeing 707. 128 people were killed in total; 46 on the CAAC 757 and 82 on the Xiamen Airlines 737.
- December 20, 1995 – American Airlines Flight 965 crashed into a mountain in Buga, Colombia killing 159 people leaving four survivors.
- February 6, 1996 – Birgenair Flight 301 stalled and crashed into the ocean near Puerto Plata, Dominican Republic, with the loss of all 189 passengers and crew.
- October 2, 1996 – Aeroperú Flight 603 crashed into the ocean off the coast of Pasamayo, Peru, with the loss of all 70 on board.
- September 14, 1999 – Britannia Airways Flight 226A suffered a runway excursion at Girona–Costa Brava Airport following a destabilized approach during a thunderstorm. All 245 on board evacuated the aircraft, but one passenger died five days later.
- September 11, 2001 – American Airlines Flight 77 was hijacked as part of the September 11 attacks; hijackers crashed the aircraft into the Pentagon in Arlington, Virginia, killing themselves, all 64 on board and 125 on the ground.
- September 11, 2001 – United Airlines Flight 93 was hijacked as part of the September 11 attacks; hijackers crashed the plane near Shanksville, Pennsylvania after crew and passengers fought back to regain control, killing themselves and all 44 on board.
- July 1, 2002 – DHL Flight 611 was involved in the 2002 Überlingen mid-air collision, when it collided with BAL Bashkirian Airlines Flight 2937, a Tupolev Tu-154, above Überlingen, Germany. Both pilots of the 757 and all 69 on board the Tu-154 were killed.
- November 28, 2002 – Arkia Israel Airlines Flight 582 was subject to a near shoot-down after departing from Mombasa, Kenya, as part of the 2002 Mombasa Attacks. The aircraft was undamaged and the flight continued safely to Tel Aviv, escorted by Israeli fighter jets.
- October 28, 2006 – Continental Airlines Flight 1883 mistakenly landed on a taxiway at Newark Liberty Airport. No casualties occurred, but the accident prompted the FAA to review procedures at the airport.
- October 25, 2010 – American Airlines Flight 1640 safely returned to Miami after suffering the loss of a 2 ft (60 cm) fuselage section at an altitude of approximately 31,000 feet (9,000 m). After investigating the incident, the FAA ordered all 757 operators in the U.S. to regularly inspect upper fuselage sections of their aircraft for structural fatigue.
- November 9, 2018 – Fly Jamaica Airways Flight 256 was substantially damaged after a runway excursion at Cheddi Jagan International Airport. One fatality was reported, and the aircraft was declared a hull loss. The other 127 occupants survived.
- April 7, 2022 – DHL de Guatemala Flight 7216 veered off the runway during an emergency landing at Juan Santamaría International Airport, San José, Costa Rica. The aircraft split in two and was written off; both pilots survived.

=== Wake turbulence incidents ===
Three general aviation aircraft crashes were blamed on wake turbulence emanating from 757s. On December 18, 1992, a Cessna Citation crashed near Billings Logan International Airport in Montana, killing all six aboard, and on December 15, 1993, an IAI Westwind crashed near John Wayne Airport in California, killing all five aboard. Both airplanes had been flying less than 3 nautical miles (6 km; 3 mi) behind a 757. The FAA subsequently increased the required separation between small aircraft and 757s from 4 nautical miles (7.4 km; 4.6 mi) to 5 nautical miles (9.3 km; 5.8 mi). A third crash occurred on April 23, 1998, when a Beechcraft Baron conducted a night approach to Port Columbus International Airport behind a 757. A witness reported observing the aircraft roll 90 degrees perpendicular to the runway into a steep descending nose low attitude and collide with the terrain while in close trail behind the 757.

== Aircraft on display ==
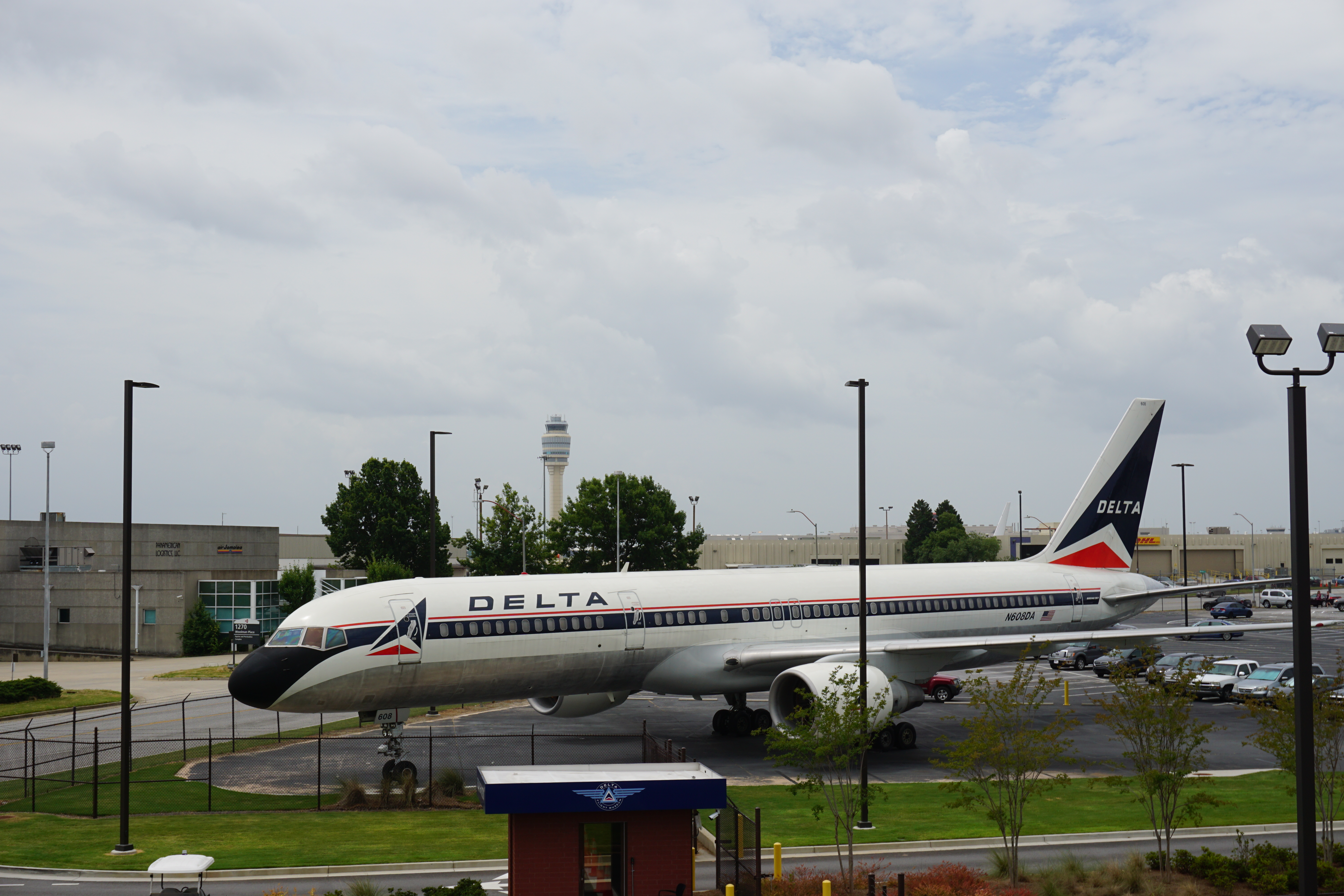
Boeing 757-200 N608DA on display at the Delta Flight Museum

A Delta Air Lines 757-200, registered as N608DA, is on display at the Delta Flight Museum in Atlanta, Georgia. The aircraft was the sixty-fourth example built. The aircraft was repainted into Delta's 'Widget' livery, the livery it wore when it was originally delivered, and is now on static display at the museum entrance.

== Specifications (Boeing 757-200 with PW2040 engines) ==
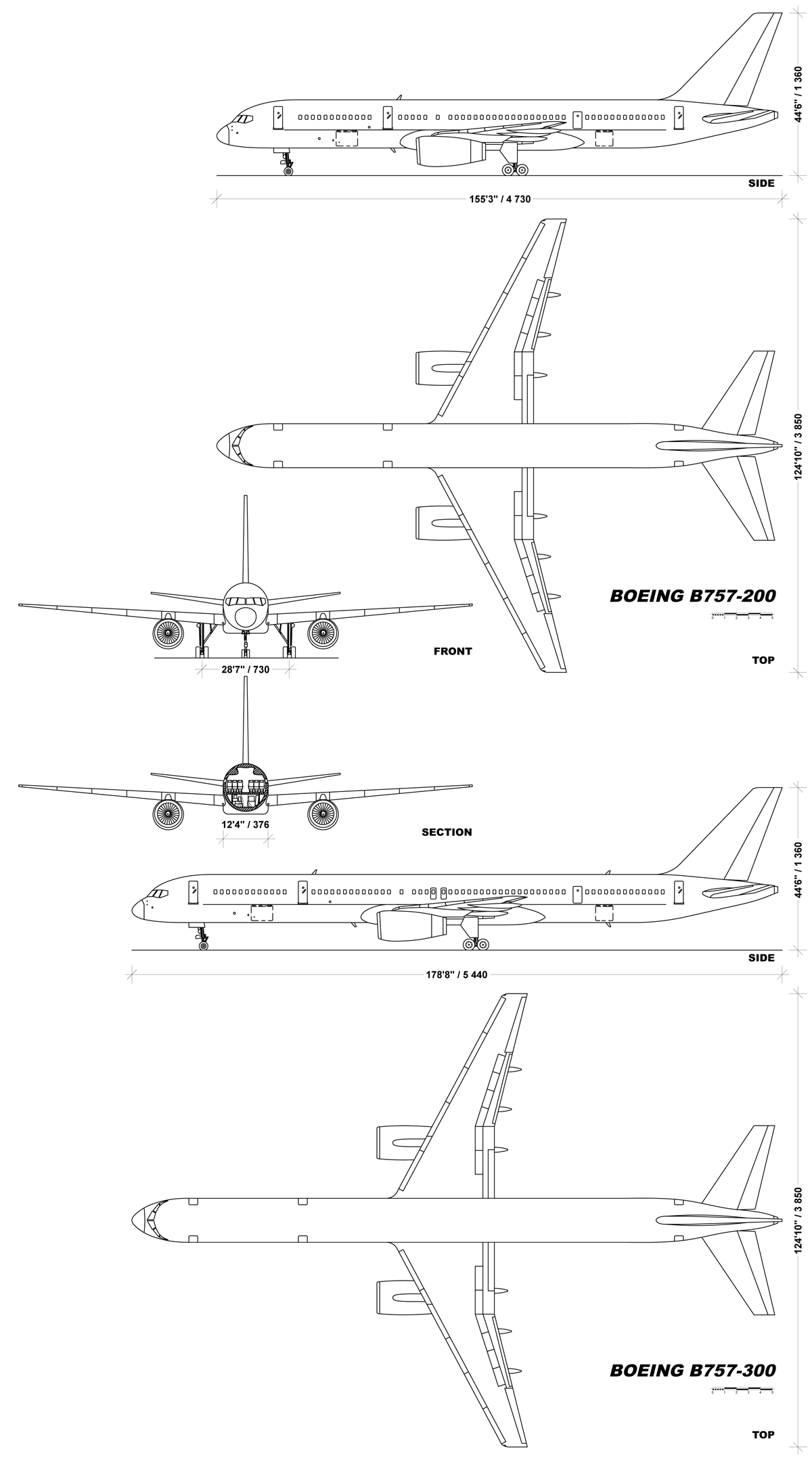
A comparison of the different 757 variants

Data from

General characteristics

- Crew: 2
- Capacity: 228 (all economy) or 200 (two classes) passengers, 1,670 cu ft (47.3 m^{3}) of cargo
- Length: 155 ft 3 in (47.3 m)
- Wingspan: 124 ft 10 in (38.0 m)
- Width: 12 ft 4 in (3.76 m)
- Height: 44 ft 6 in (13.6 m)
- Wing area: 1,994.0 sq ft (185.25 m^{2})
- Empty weight: 130,440 lb (59,160 kg)
- Max takeoff weight: 255,000 lb (115,660 kg)
- Fuel capacity: 11,489 US Gal (43,490 L)
- Powerplant: 2 × Pratt & Whitney PW2040 high-bypass turbofan engines, 40,100 lbf (178 kN) thrust each

Performance

- Maximum speed: Mach 0.86
- Range: 4,500 mi (7,250 km, 3,915 nmi)
- Service ceiling: 42,000 ft (13,000 m)

== See also ==
- Competition between Airbus and Boeing

Related development

- Boeing 767

Aircraft of comparable role, configuration, and era

- Airbus A321
- Boeing 737-900ER
- Boeing Business Jet
- Tupolev Tu-204
- Airbus A300-600
- Airbus A310

Related lists

- List of civil aircraft
- List of Boeing customer codes
- List of jet airliners

== Sources ==
- Birtles, Philip (1999). Boeing 757/767/777. London: Ian Allan Publishing "Modern Civil Aircraft" n. 6, 3rd ed. ISBN 0-7110-2665-3.
- Birtles, Philip (2001). Boeing 757. Osceola, Wisconsin: MBI Publishing. ISBN 978-0-7603-1123-3.
- Bowers, Peter M. (1989). Boeing Aircraft Since 1916. Annapolis, Maryland: Naval Institute Press. ISBN 978-0-87021-037-2.
- Davies, R. E. G. (1990). Delta, an Airline and Its Aircraft: The Illustrated History of a Major U.S. Airline and the People who Made it. Miami, Florida: Paladwr Press. ISBN 0-9626483-0-2.
- Davies, R. E. G. (2003). Eastern: an Airline and Its Aircraft. McLean, Virginia: Paladwr Press. ISBN 1-888962-19-4.
- Davies, R. E. G. (2000). TWA: an Airline and Its Aircraft. McLean, Virginia: Paladwr Press. ISBN 1-888962-16-X.
- Eden, Paul, ed. (2008). Civil Aircraft Today: The World's Most Successful Commercial Aircraft. Silverdale, Washington: Amber Books Ltd. ISBN 978-1-84509-324-2.
- Kane, Robert M. (2003). Air Transportation 1903–2003. Fourteenth Edition. Dubuque, Iowa: Kendall Hunt Publishing. ISBN 978-0-7872-8881-5.
- Norris, Guy; Wagner, Mark (1998). Boeing. Osceola, Wisconsin: MBI Publishing. ISBN 0-7603-0497-1.
- Norris, Guy; Wagner, Mark (1999). "757: New Directions". Modern Boeing Jetliners. Osceola, Wisconsin: Zenith Imprint. ISBN 0-7603-0717-2.
- Pace, Steve (1999). F-22 Raptor: America's Next Lethal War Machine. New York, New York: McGraw Hill. ISBN 978-0-07-134271-1.
- Sharpe, Mike; Shaw, Robbie (2001). Boeing 737-100 and 200. Osceola, Wisconsin: MBI Publishing. ISBN 0-7603-0991-4.
- Veronico, Nick; Dunn, Jim (2004). 21st Century U.S. Air Power. St. Paul, Minnesota: Zenith Press. ISBN 0-7603-2014-4.
- Wells, Alexander T.; Rodrigues, Clarence C. (2004). Commercial Aviation Safety. New York, New York: McGraw-Hill Professional. ISBN 0-07-141742-7.
- Combating Terrorism: Interagency Framework and Agency Programs to Address the Overseas Threat. Washington, District of Columbia: United States General Accounting Office. 2003. ISBN 978-1-4289-3944-8.
