= ISTAT =

ISTAT may refer to:

- International Society of Transport Aircraft Trading
- i-STAT, a blood analyzer made by Abbott Laboratories
- Italian National Institute of Statistics or Istituto Nazionale di Statistica
