= Garment bag =

Bag for carrying clothes

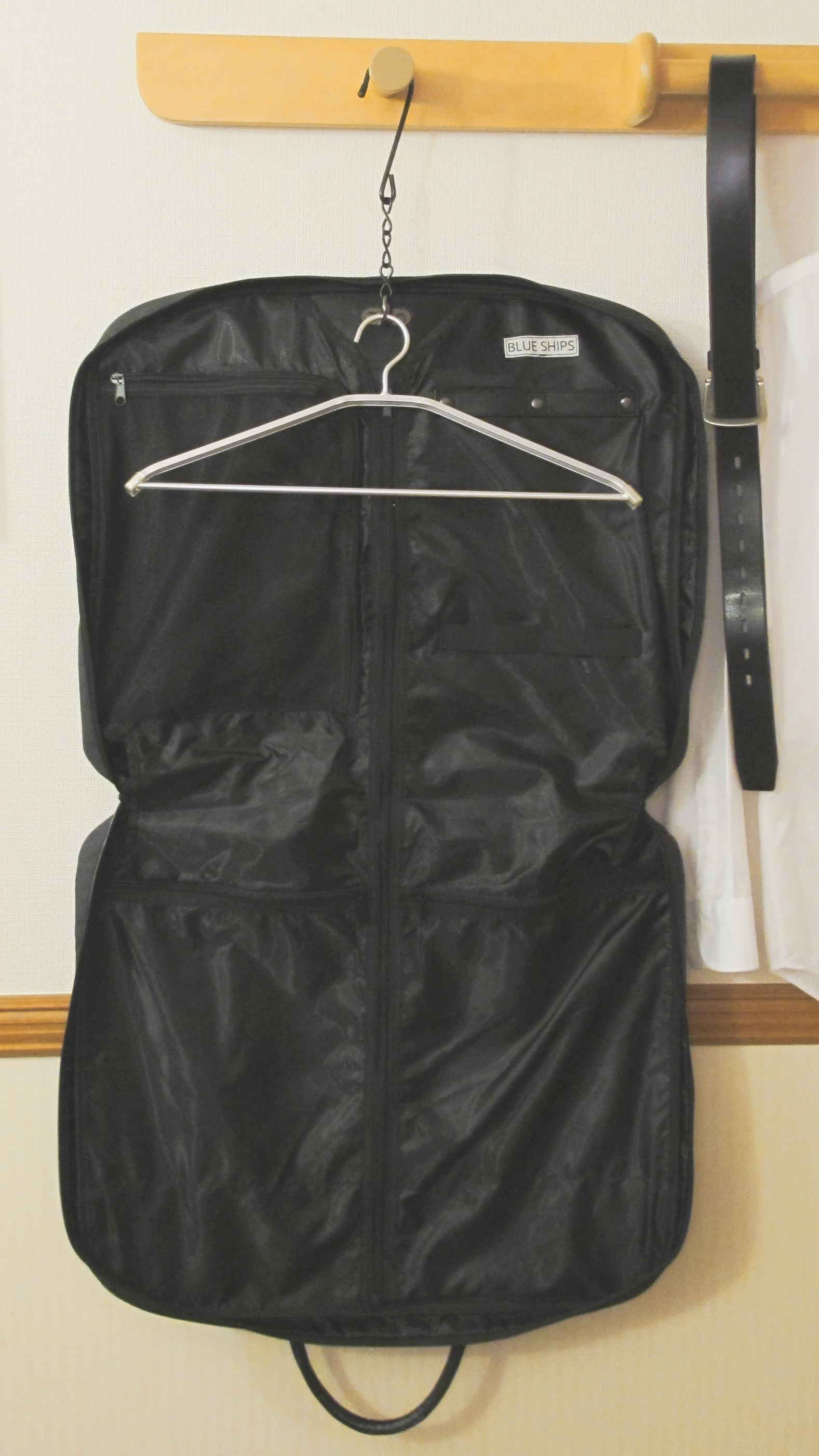
An opened garment bag

A garment bag or suit bag is a container of flexible material, usually used to ease transporting suits, jackets or clothing in general, and also to protect clothes from dust by hanging them inside with their hangers and then on a closet bar. The simplest models usually have a zipper that opens from top to bottom, in the middle of one side. They can be manufactured with different materials, such as fabric, leather or plastic.

Some models of garment bag may have a strap for holding them on the shoulder and quite often, some type of handle. They come in different shapes and sizes depending on the length of the clothes that should contain. Some designs have two handles that can be folded by the middle for ease of carrying.

Garment bags protect clothing from dust, dirt and smells. They help to keep clothes in good condition whether traveling or hanging in wardrobe. Some have an identification window to allow easy inspection of their contents.

== Dangers ==
Garment bags made of thin plastic are a risk to children who might play with them due to risk of death by asphyxiation.
