= International Society of Transport Aircraft Trading =

Non-profit aviation association

The International Society of Transport Aircraft Trading (ISTAT) is a non-profit aviation industry association. Founded in 1983, ISTAT is dedicated to fostering and promoting interest and educational opportunities in commercial aviation, while also providing a forum for networking among those involved in the industry.

== ISTAT membership ==
ISTAT currently has more than 1800 members worldwide involved in operating, manufacturing, maintaining, selling, purchasing, financing, leasing, appraising, insuring or otherwise engaging in activities related to commercial transport category aircraft.

ISTAT is governed by its bylaws and the volunteer ISTAT Board of Directors, which is composed of and elected by the members.

== ISTAT Foundation ==
The ISTAT Foundation fosters interest in, creates opportunities for, and provides assistance through the global aviation community by offering scholarships, grants, internships and humanitarian aid worldwide.

The Foundation awards more than $250,000 in scholarships, grants and humanitarian efforts annually to recipients around the world. Grants are awarded to institutions involved in both elementary and higher education as well as to humanitarian organizations. Scholarships have been presented to students from the U.S., U.K., Turkey, The Netherlands, China, Germany, Australia, and Kenya. The Foundation’s most recently established internship program matches aviation-focused college students to internship positions open at ISTAT member companies.

== ISTAT certified appraisers’ program ==
ISTAT has established rigorous testing and qualification standards for members who are engaged in appraising aircraft and support equipment. Within ISTAT is a core group of professional aircraft appraisers who work cooperatively for the elevation of the appraisal profession within the world aviation community. Each ISTAT member, who has satisfactorily demonstrated that he or she is qualified to appraise airline transport aircraft, has been granted the right to use one of the ISTAT professional designations, established by ISTAT and predicated upon a set group of criteria.

== ISTAT events ==
=== Annual European Conference ===
The ISTAT European Conference occurs each autumn, at different European locations. The 2009 European Conference was held October 11–13 in Dubrovnik, Croatia.

=== Air Show Receptions ===
Annually, ISTAT hosts receptions at (or near) selected air shows, including Dubai (2023), Singapore (when?), Farnborough (2018), and Paris (2023).
