= Beriev A-50 =

Soviet airborne early warning and control (AEW&C) aircraft

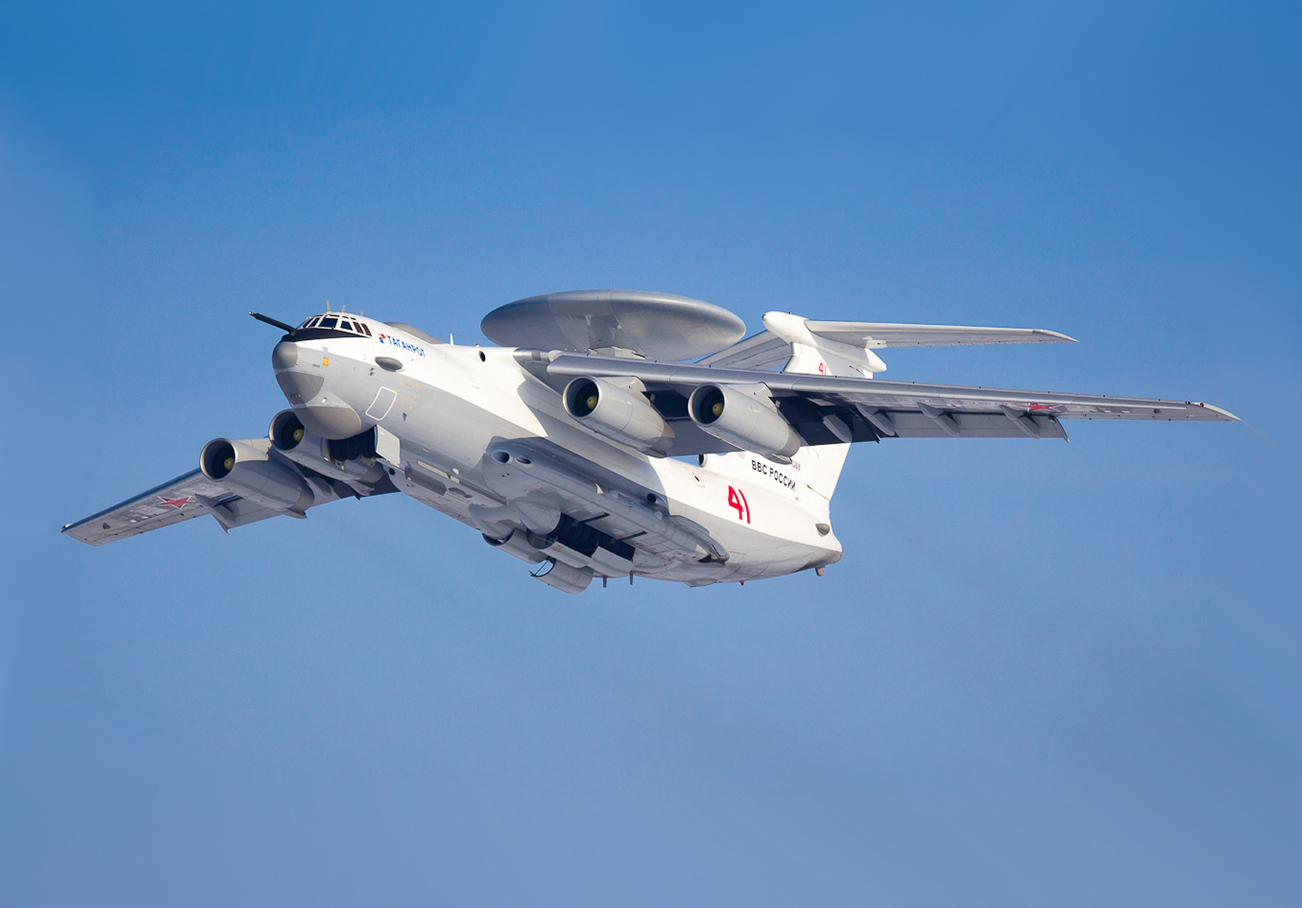
- 41 Taganrog, registration number RF-94268, a Beriev A-50U

General information
- Type: Airborne early warning and control
- Manufacturer: Beriev
- Status: In service
- Primary users: Russian Aerospace Forces Indian Air Force
- Number built: ~42

History
- Manufactured: 1978–1992
- Introduction date: 1985
- First flight: 19 December 1978
- Developed from: Ilyushin Il-76
- Developed into: Beriev A-100

The Beriev A-50 (NATO reporting name: Mainstay) is a Soviet-origin airborne early warning and control (AEW&C) aircraft that is based on the Ilyushin Il-76 transport plane. Developed to replace the Tupolev Tu-126 "Moss", the A-50 first flew in 1978. Its existence was revealed to the Western Bloc in 1978 by Adolf Tolkachev. It entered service in 1985, with about 42 produced by 1992 when the breakup of the Soviet Union ended production.

== Design and development ==
=== A-50 ===
The mission personnel of the 15-man crew derive data from the large Liana surveillance radar with its antenna in an over-fuselage rotodome, which has a diameter of 9 metres (30 ft) Detection range is 650 kilometres (400 mi; 350 nmi) for air targets and 300 kilometres (190 mi; 160 nmi) for ground targets.

The A-50 can control up to ten fighter aircraft for either air-to-air intercept or air-to-ground attack missions. The A-50 can fly for four hours with a range of 1,000 kilometres (620 mi; 540 nmi) from its base, at a maximum takeoff weight of 190 metric tons (420,000 lb). The aircraft can be refuelled by Il-78 tankers.

The "Vega-M" radar is designed by MNIIP, Moscow, and produced by NPO Vega. The "Vega-M" can track up to 150 targets simultaneously within 230 kilometres (140 mi; 120 nmi). Large targets, like surface ships, can be tracked at a distance of 400 kilometres (250 mi; 220 nmi).

=== A-50U ===
Development work on a modernised version, the A-50U, began in 2003; state tests started on 10 September 2008, using a Russian Air Force A-50 "37 Red" as a prototype. It replaces analogue avionics with a new digital avionics suite, made by NPO Vega, that speeds data processing and improves signal tracking and target detection. Crew rest, toilet and galley facilities are also included in the upgrade.

After completing the joint state tests, Beriev delivered the first A-50U to the Russian Air Force. The aircraft, "47 Red", RF-92957, was handed over at Beriev's facility in Taganrog on 31 October 2011. It was accepted by an aircrew serving with the 2457th Aviation Base for Combat Operation of Airborne Early Warning Aircraft (Aviabaza Boevogo Primeneniya Samolyotov Dal'nego Radiolokatsionnogo Obnaruzheniya) at Ivanovo Severny, the only base using the A-50 operationally, which operates 16 aircraft. The fourth A-50U, "41 Taganrog", was delivered to the Russian Aerospace Forces on 7 March 2017. The fifth A-50U, "45 Red", was delivered on 6 December 2018. Eight A-50U aircraft have been delivered as of September 2023.

The A-50U upgrade forms the basis of the concept for Beriev A-100 AEW&C. Its configuration will be similar, but with a new Vega Premier active electronically scanned array radar.

It was announced by Rostec that production of the A-50U would restart in 2024. However, it is likely that production resumption will be delayed for a few years.

=== A-50EI ===
The A-50EI is the designation of the export designation for the Indian Air Force. The AWACS variant based on the Il-76TD platform is equipped with Aviadvigatel PS-90A-76 engines, Vega-supplied data link and Israeli EL/W-2090 radar.

On 2 March 2004, a deal worth US$1.1 billion was signed between Israel and India as per which IAI would deliver the Indian Air Force three Phalcon AEW&C radar systems. The systems were estimated to cost approximately $350 million each and would be delivered within 44 months. The deal followed a preliminary agreement in October 2003. India signed a deal with Ilyushin of Russia for the supply of three Il-76TD heavy airlifters, which were to be used as platforms for these radar systems, for US$500 million each.

The first aircraft was delivered to India on 25 May 2009, landing at Jamnagar AFS in Gujarat, completing its 8 hour long journey from Israel. After entering the Indian airspace the aircraft was escorted by 3 MiG-29 and Jaguars each. This marked the first AWACS of the Indian Air Force. It was inducted into No. 50 Squadron on 28 May. The aircraft had been delivered to Israel for radar integration on 20 January 2008. The second aircraft was delivered in 2010. The third aircraft (KW-3553) was delivered to Israel for radar integration on 8 October 2010. All the aircraft were delivered by 2011.

India had plans to procure 2 additional AWACS of the same type. But the price was a hindrance. As per report in October 2017 the Indian government was ready for $800 million but OEMs wanted $1.3 billion for the deal. This was a result of the sudden increase in price of Il-76. On 11 September 2018, the deal, worth around $800 million, was ready to be cleared by the Cabinet Committee on Security (CCS) after multiple delays. By then, the Phalcon system was an integral part of IACCS. In August 2020, India was reportedly ready to approve the deal for around $1 billion, with scheduled delivery within the next 3 or 4 years with upgrades. The acquisition plan was derailed earlier multiple times. however the acquisition plan did not move ahead as of 2022 and IAF revealed plans to operate some AEW&Cs on lease from international market as intermediate measure until indigenous Netra Mk 2 is procured.

== Operational history ==
=== In peacetime ===
The aircraft entered service with the 67th Independent Aviation Squadron, Long-Range Airborne Surveillance (67 OAE DRLO) (в/ч 32457) in 1984 at Šiauliai in the Lithuanian SSR. The unit was redesignated the 144th Independent Regiment DRLO, (в/ч 89449) and later moved to Pechora Kamenka (often referred to as "Berezovka") in 1998.

There was a detachment of two A-50s and one Il-76 as part of the 192nd Guards Kerch Red Banner Military Transport Aviation Regiment (в/ч 26212), Ukurey Airfield Chita Oblast in Russia from 1985 to 1995. It was formed at the Ulan-Ude (Vostochny) airfield in 1985, and flew to Ukurei in 1988. It was disbanded in 1995 and aircraft transferred to the 144th Independent Regiment. The 18th Independent Aviation Detachment DRLO (two A-50s and 1 Il-76) was established at the Vitebsk-Severny airfield from 1985. In 1993, the detachment was disestablished.

Two aircraft "operated round-the-clock over [the] Black Sea during Operations Desert Shield and Desert Storm of the Gulf War (1990–1991), monitoring United States Air Force operations from Turkey and keeping a watch for "stray" cruise missiles."

=== Syrian Civil War ===
In late December 2015, the A-50 started operations over Syria, flying from Russia, to support Russian military intervention in the Syrian Civil War.

=== Russo-Ukrainian War ===
In December 2018, the A-50 was deployed to Crimea.

External videos
- ⚡️ А-50 — Дыверсія на відэа — Мачулішчы. Новыя кадры з дрона — гэта ўжо не выведка (A-50 — Sabotage on video — Machulishchi. New footage from a drone is no longer intelligence), retrieved 9 September 2023

On 26 February 2023, during the Russian invasion of Ukraine, the Association of Security Forces of Belarus (BYPOL), a partisan group, reported that it had conducted a drone attack and damaged a Russian A-50 at the Machulishchy air base near Minsk, Belarus. The attacked base also hosts MiG-31 interceptors used to attack Ukraine. However, satellite imagery of the Machulishchy air base from 28 February showed no significant damage to the sole A-50 located there. The drone operators posted a video of a practice run of the alleged A-50U bombing on YouTube on 2 March 2023, which shows the drone flying into Machulishchy unopposed, then landing on the A-50's rotodome. On 3 March 2023, the drone operators posted a second video showing a drone landing on the domed area on top of the fuselage just forward of the wings followed by a loss of video signal claimed to be due to the actual explosion.

On 17 November 2023, the British Defence Ministry said that it believed it "likely" that Russian forces were updating their A-50 early warning aircraft in anticipation of the West supplying Ukraine with modern fighter jets such as the F-16. The aircraft may also be integrated with ground-based S-400 missile systems.

Ukrainian forces claimed to have shot down an A-50 over the Sea of Azov on 14 January 2024 while it was on duty in the Kyrylivka area. The A-50 reportedly disappeared from radar and stopped responding to requests from tactical aviation. Later several Western and Ukrainian sources reported that the pilot of a Su-30 aircraft of the Russian Air Force detected the fire and crash of an unidentified aircraft in the area, presumably the A-50. Forbes journalist David Axe cited one analyst who said that the Ukrainian Air Force first disabled Russian radars across Crimea, causing the Russians to re-establish radar coverage there by moving their A-50 north to near Berdyansk, thus within range of a Ukrainian SAM battery which shot it down. Axe said that this may have left the Russian air force with just two serviceable A-50s, with the other six needing to be upgraded and overhauled. As of 25 October 2025, Russian "war correspondents" have confirmed that the A-50 was indeed shot down. Open source analysts later identified that the aircraft lost was A-50U "37 red" of the 610th Center for Combat Use and Retraining of Military Transport Aviation Flight Personnel (610th CBP i PLS), based at Ivanovo Severny. Col. Rosanna Clemente, Assistant Chief of Staff at the 10th US Army Air and Missile Defense Command, later confirmed that this A-50 had been shot down by a Ukrainian-operated Patriot air defense system.

Ukrainian official sources said that on 23 February 2024 a second A-50U aircraft had been shot down, over the Sea of Azov in Krasnodar Krai, at 18:44 Ukraine local time, (Note: Official, N/A. "Повідомлення Мінус А-50У ― ГУР та Повітряні Сили збили черговий літак рф". Головне управління розвідки Міністерства оборони України (Message: Minus A-50U..). Defense intelligence of Ukraine. Ukrainian language.) by a long-range Soviet-era S-200 missile system. According to Ukrainian sources, 10 Russians were killed on the plane, including five majors. The aircraft was later identified as A-50U "42 red" of the 610th CBP i PLS. Kyrylo Budanov, head of Ukraine's Defence Intelligence, said that as of 25 February 2024 Russia had only six operational A-50s. The BBC stated at this time that Russia had originally had six A-50s operational, with two destroyed in 2024 leaving it with only four.

The Taganrog Beriev Aviation Scientific and Technical Complex where the A-50s are repaired was reported to have suffered damage on the night of 8/9 March 2024, possibly from a Ukrainian drone strike.

On 1 June 2025, the Ukrainian SBU claimed to have damaged an A-50 at the Ivanovo airbase, using drones as part of Operation Spider's Web. Two journalists have claimed to see extended footage that confirmed two A-50s were damaged in the operation. It is unclear if the A-50s damaged were in a usable state with at least one missing engines and both having worn radomes.

== Variants ==
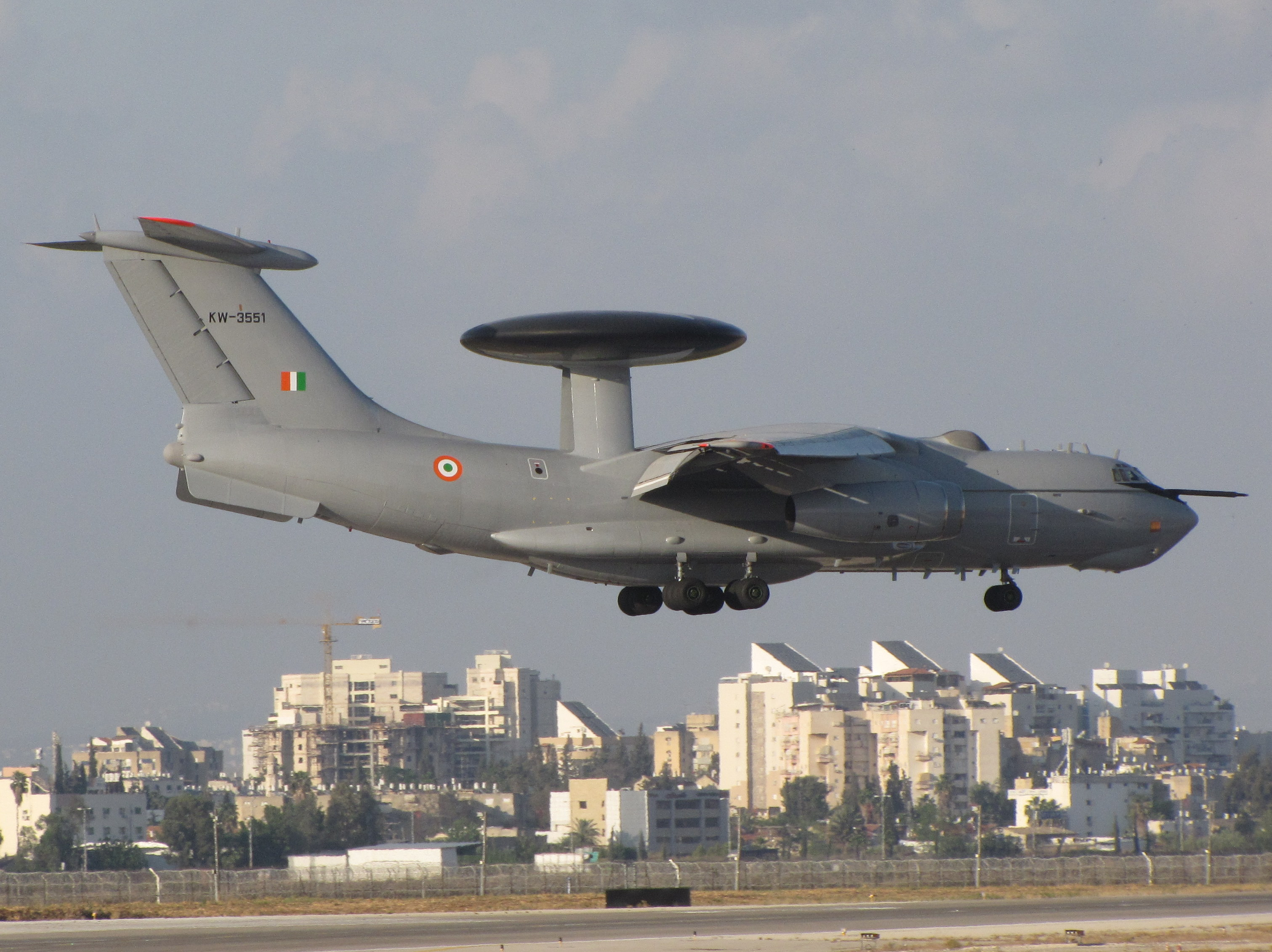
Indian Air Force A-50EI

- A-50 – Original variant
- A-50M – Updated variant of the A-50 fitted with mid-air refueling. Equipped with Shemel-2 radars.
- A-50U – (Mainstay-B) Updated variant of the A-50M with modern electronics and increased crew comfort. Has Shemel-M radar.
- llyushin/Beriyev 'Aircraft 676' – A single stop-gap telemetry and tracking aircraft
- llyushin/Beriyev 'Aircraft 776' – A single stop-gap telemetry and tracking aircraft
- llyushin/Beriyev 'Aircraft 976' (SKIP) – (Airborne Check-Measure-and-Control Center) – Il-76-based Range Control and Missile tracking platform initially built to support Raduga Kh-55 cruise missile tests
- Izdeliye 1076 – A single special-mission aircraft with unknown duties
- A-50EI – A 2000s export version for the Indian Air Force with Aviadvigatel PS-90A-76 engines and Israeli EL/W-2090 radar.

== Operators ==
India

India received its first A-50 on 28 May 2009. The plane was inducted into the No. 50 Squadron.

- Indian Air Force – 3 in service, 2 on order.
  - Agra Air force Station, Agra, Uttar Pradesh
    - No. 50 Squadron

Russia

- Russian Aerospace Forces
  - 2457th Aviation Base (Ivanovo Severny)
  - 144th Independent Regiment Long-Range Airborne Surveillance

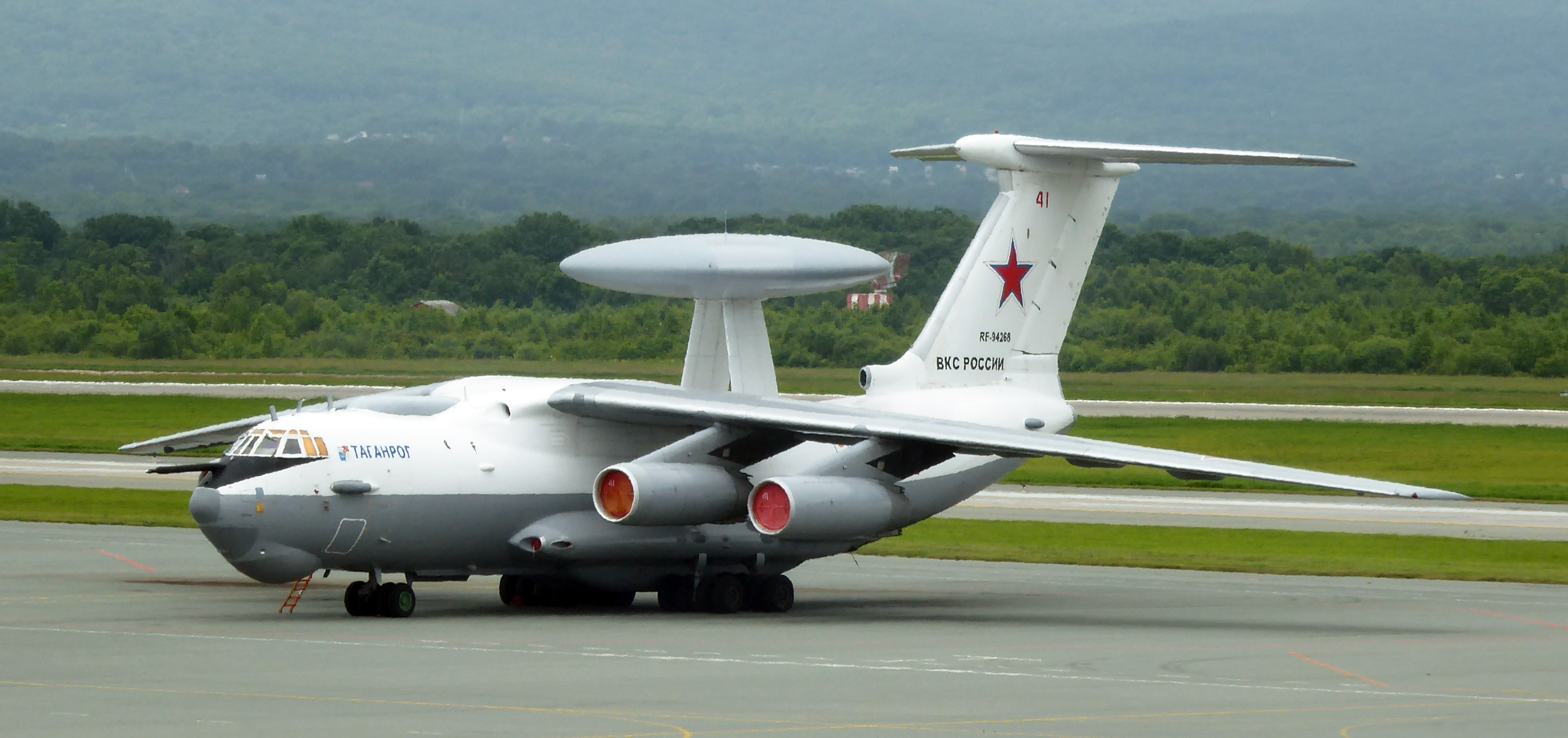
A Russian A-50U at Vladivostok International Airport 2019

=== Former operators ===
Soviet Union

The Soviet Union made 40–42 A-50s for itself. Production stopped after the dissolution of the Soviet Union.

- Soviet Air Defence Forces (1984–1992)
  - 144th Independent Regiment Long-Range Airborne Surveillance

Russia

Russia's Air Defense Force had most of the remaining A-50s after the dissolution of the Soviet Union. The exact number is not known.

- Russian Air Defence Forces (1992–1998)

== Specifications (A-50E) ==
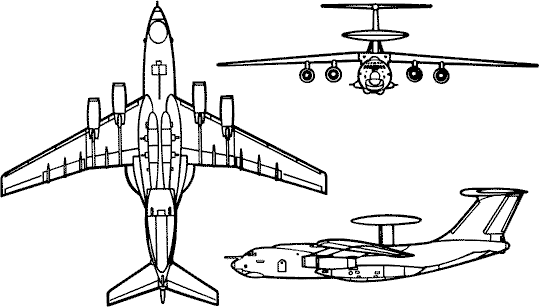
Orthographically projected diagram of the Beriev A-50.

Data from Worldwide Equipment Guide – Volume 2: Airspace and Air Defense Systems, United States Army Training and Doctrine Command, p. 3-44

General characteristics

- Crew: 5 (2 pilots, 3 other flight crew) + 10 mission operators
- Length: 46.6 m (152 ft 11 in)
- Wingspan: 50.6 m (166 ft 0 in)
- Height: 14.8 m (48 ft 7 in)
- Wing area: 300 m^{2} (3,200 sq ft)
- Airfoil: root: TsAGI P-151 (13%); tip: TsAGI P-151 (10%)
- Empty weight: 61,000 kg (134,482 lb)
- Max takeoff weight: 170,000 or 190,000 kg (374,786 or 418,878 lb) based on if the A-50 is based on the Il-76M (170,000 kg) or Il-76MD (190,000 kg)
- Powerplant: 4 × Soloviev D-30KP turbofan engines, 117.68 kN (26,445 lbf) thrust each

Performance

- Maximum speed: 850 km/h (530 mph, 460 kn)
- Cruise speed: 750–800 km/h (470–500 mph, 400–430 kn)
- Range: 7,500 km (4,700 mi, 4,000 nmi)
- Endurance: 4 hours with internal fuel and maximum payload
- Service ceiling: 15,500 m (50,900 ft)

Armament

- Guns: 2 x 23 mm (0.906 in) GSh-23 autocannons at the base of the rudder

== See also ==
Related development

- Shaanxi KJ-2000
- Baghdad-1 and Baghdad-2

Aircraft of comparable role, configuration, and era

- Boeing E-3 Sentry (AWACS)
- EL/W-2090
