= 2024 Russia Beriev A-50 and Ilyushin Il-22 shootdowns =

Russian aircraft shootdowns

Shootdowns
- Date: January 14, 2024
- Summary: Shootdowns
- Site: Sea of Azov near Kyrylivka, Zaporizhzhia Oblast and near Anapa, Krasnodar Krai, Russia
- Total fatalities: 12-13
- Total injuries: Several
- Total survivors: Several

First aircraft
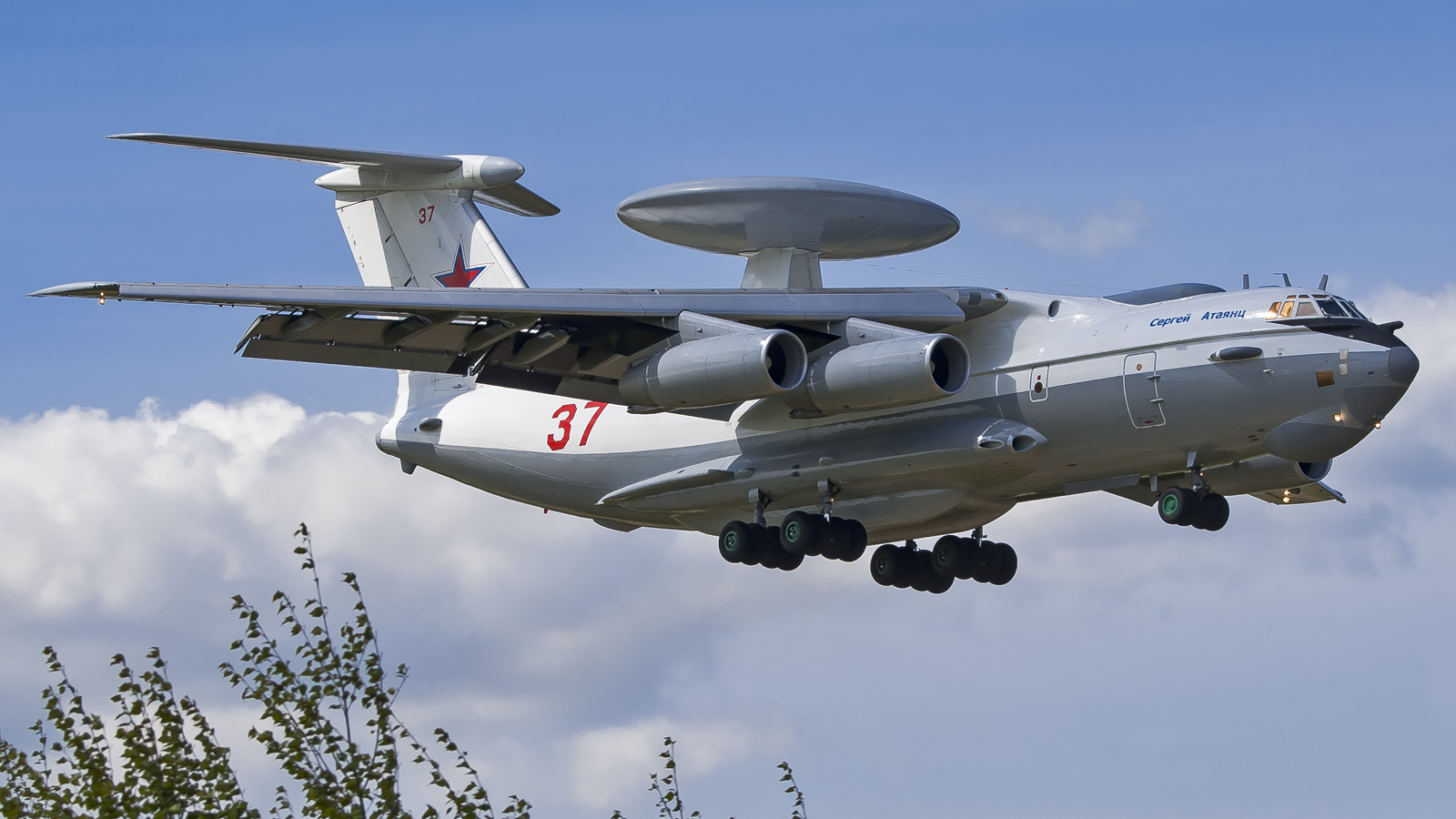
- RF-93966, the Beriev A-50 involved in the accident, pictured in 2017
- Type: Beriev A-50U
- Operator: Russian Air Force
- Registration: RF-93966
- Occupants: 11–12
- Passengers: 0
- Crew: 11–12
- Fatalities: 11–12
- Survivors: 0

Second aircraft
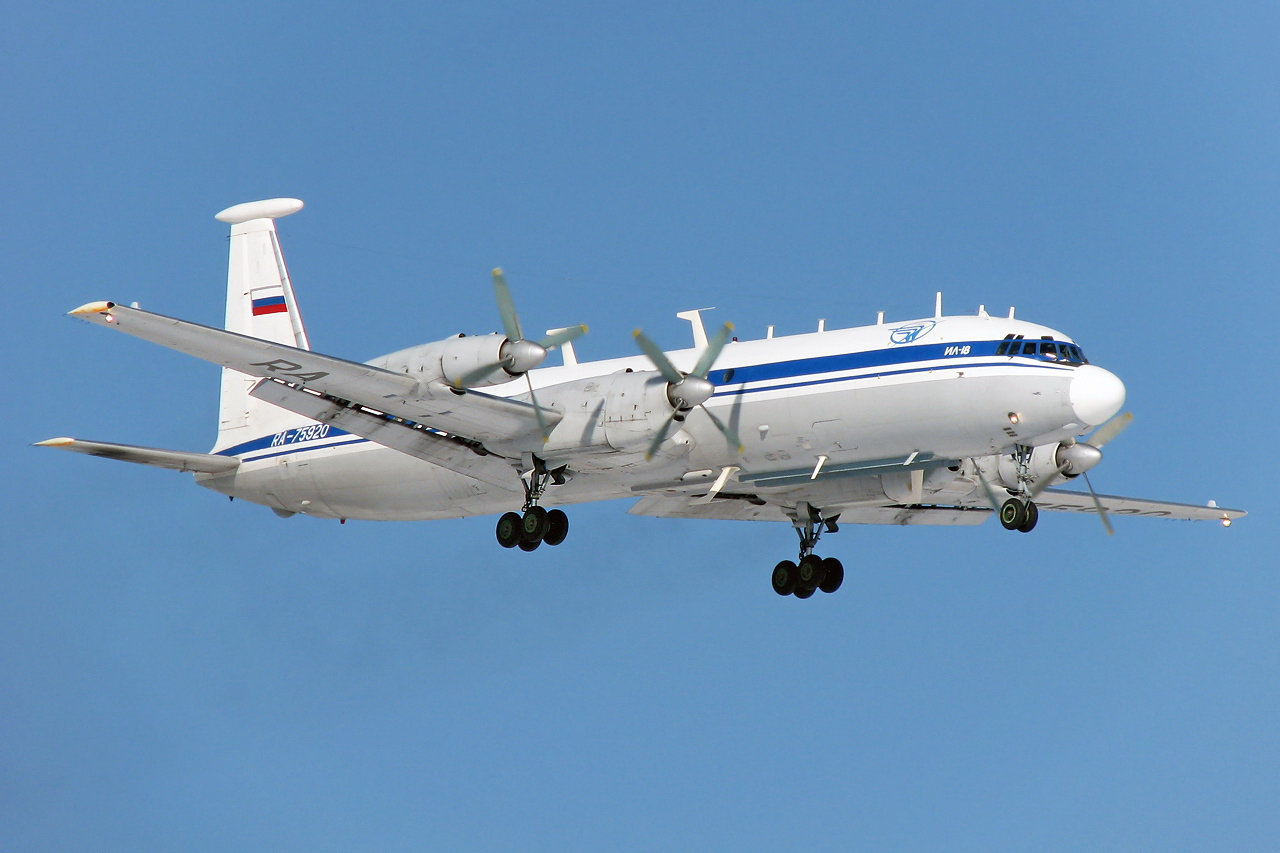
- The Russian Air Force Ilyushin Il-22M involved in the accident, pictured in 2011 in a previous registration
- Type: Ilyushin Il-22M-11RT
- Operator: Russian Air Force
- Registration: RF-95678
- Occupants: Several
- Fatalities: 1
- Injuries: Several
- Survivors: Several

The 2024 Sea of Azov Beriev A-50U shootdown was an aviation incident that occurred during the Russian invasion of Ukraine on January 14, 2024.

On the evening of January 14, 2024, Ukraine reported that a Russian Beriev A-50 reconnaissance aircraft was shot down over the Sea of Azov. A Russian Ilyushin Il-22 was also shot at but managed to land at Anapa Airport, although the commander was killed, several occupants were injured, including the co-pilot, and the plane was damaged.

Journalists called the downing of the A-50 one of the largest single losses of Russian aviation during the entire Russian invasion of Ukraine.

== Background ==
=== Aircraft ===
==== Beriev А-50 ====
The A-50 aircraft is a modification of the Ilyushin Il-76 that functions as a "flying radar". The cost of one A-50 was estimated at $330 million.

According to the Military Balance 2022 bulletin, at the beginning of the Russian invasion of Ukraine, Russia had three A-50 and six modified A-50U aircraft in service. However, the media reported that in 2023, Rostec transferred another aircraft to the Russian Armed Forces.

The A-50 was actively used during the invasion of Ukraine. It is capable of simultaneously tracking up to 60 air, surface and ground targets, directing combat aircraft to them. The A-50 is capable of detecting a fighter-class target flying at low altitude at a range of up to 200–400 km, and a target flying at high altitude at a range of up to 300–600 km; it can detect sea targets at a distance of up to 400 km. The aircraft is also equipped with active and passive electronic warfare systems, as well as infrared jamming systems. The A-50U has higher performance characteristics.

Military pilot and retired Major General Vladimir Popov claimed that with the help of the A-50, Russia is able to track Patriot air defense missile launches and then attack them. Journalists noted that the A-50s are capable of significantly complicating the actions of Ukrainian aviation, for example, attacks by Su-24 frontline bombers with Storm Shadow missiles on Russian targets.

Russia had not previously lost any A-50 aircraft in the war with Ukraine. In February 2023, one A-50 was damaged by a drone in Belarus, after which it was sent to Taganrog for repairs.

==== Ilyushin Il-22M ====
Journalists noted that the Il-22M could play the role of both a relay aircraft and an airborne command post.

According to the Military Balance 2022 bulletin, at the beginning of the Russian invasion of Ukraine, Russian had 12 Il-22M aircraft and 10 Il-22's of an earlier modification in service. In June 2023, during the Wagner Group rebellion, one Il-22M was shot down in Voronezh Oblast. The Russian newspaper Moskovskij Komsomolets also wrote that in October 2022, one Il-22 was fired upon by Ukrainian forces and was damaged, but managed to return to base.

== Course of events ==
=== Ukrainian sources ===
On January 14, 2024, at 22:20 Kyiv time, the Ukrainian monitoring Telegram channel Nikolaevsky Vanyok wrote: "...how was your flight in the Sea of Azov?". Twenty minutes later, the People's Deputy of Ukraine and Deputy Head of the Verkhovna Rada on Defense and Intelligence, Yuriy Mykhailovych Mysyagin wrote that at around 9:00 an A-50 was shot down, and "an IL-22 was hit, the latter was in the air and was trying to reach the nearest airfield, but disappeared from radar after it began to descend in the Kerch region.". Similar information was published by People's Deputy Oleksandr Fedienko. At around 11:20 p.m., RBC-Ukraine, citing sources among the Armed Forces of Ukraine, confirmed this information and published an intercepted conversation between the Il-22M pilot and the airfield dispatcher in Anapa, in which he requested an emergency landing and assistance from ambulance services and firefighters. Soon, Hromadske, citing sources in the Main Intelligence Directorate (G.U.), also confirmed this information. According to RBC-Ukraine, after the A-50 aircraft disappeared from radar, the pilot of a Russian Sukhoi Su-30 discovered "the fire and fall of an unidentified aircraft".

According to the Suspilne publication, the Il-22M was shot at on January 14 at around 9:00 p.m. in the area of Strilkove in Kherson Oblast, and the A-50 was hit at a time between 9:10-9:15 on the same day in the area of Kyrylivka in Zaporizhzhia Oblast.

The next day at 8:03 a.m., the commander of the Ukrainian Air Force, Nikolai Oleshchuk, wrote on his Telegram channel: "This is for the Dnieper campaign." Journalists noted that a year earlier, on January 14, 2023, a Russian missile destroyed a multi-story residential building in Dnipro, killing 46 civilians. The Ukrainian Air Force press service soon also wrote: "The special operation in the Rostov Oblast was successful. To be continued."

At around 11:38 a.m., Commander-in-Chief of the Armed Forces of Ukraine Valerii Zaluzhnyi wrote on his Telegram channel: "Soldiers of the Air Force of the Armed Forces of Ukraine destroyed an enemy A-50 airborne early warning aircraft and an enemy Il-22 airborne command post." He thanked the Ukrainian military "for the perfectly planned and executed operation in the Rostov Oblast." Zaluzhnyi published an animated map of the flights of the aircraft, according to which they were on duty in the northwestern part of the Sea of Azov in the Prymorsk area.

However, a few hours later, against the backdrop of the publication of photographs of the damaged IL-22 on the Internet, a representative of the Ukrainian Air Force, Yurii Ihnat, stated: "It looks like the IL-22 did make it to Anapa." He noted that the A-50 was the priority target, and "until today, the destruction of this aircraft seemed like an impossible task" for the Ukrainian Armed Forces, while the Il-22M "got caught in the crossfire." At the same time, Ihnat stated that the Il-22 "cannot be restored" anyway, so the target can be considered destroyed.

On January 15, 2024, the monitoring Telegram channel Krymskiy Veter noted that since the evening of January 14, there had not been a single civilian vessel with a switched-on transponder in the central part of the Sea of Azov, in connection with which the channel suggested "it is possible that military ships and vessels are conducting search operations."

=== Russian sources ===
The press secretary of the Russian president, Dmitry Peskov, stated that he has no information about any Russian aircraft being shot down by the Ukrainian Armed Forces, and referred the question to the Russian Defense Ministry. The Russian Defense Ministry did not comment on the information.

However, the information about the strikes on the planes was confirmed by Russian "war correspondents" and Z-bloggers. Alexander Kots wrote "there is a downed A-50, there is a saved Il-22". Blogger Yuri Podolyaka also said "About the A-50... Unfortunately, this is true". The destruction of the A-50 was also acknowledged by the WarGonzo channel, which wrote: "Unfortunately, war never goes without tragedies, and the death of our soldiers is always painful. We express our condolences to the crew's families and friends." Telegram channel Rybar wrote that if the information about the downing of the planes is confirmed, it will be "another black day for the Russian Aerospace Forces and Air Defense," since there are "not many" A-50s, and "specialists on them are really rare."

At the same time, Boris Rozhin wrote: "Il-18/22 has definitely returned." Fighterbomber said: "A tragedy is always a tragedy. Especially when it is of such a scale. Whoever was there. Who is to blame for the deaths of the pilots, we will most likely never know. May the dead fly forever, and may the wounded recover quickly and return to duty." Fighterbomber later blamed the Russian command for lack of coordination and reported that 11 or 12 people were killed on board the A-50. Blogger Kirill Fedorov started a fundraiser to help the families of pilots.

On January 18, 2024, the Telegram channel "Spy Dossier" published a list of pilots who, according to the Telegram channel's statement, were in the destroyed A-50. The Telegram channel published the names of the plane's commander, Vyacheslav Levchenko, and five other crew members, although the publication noted that the list was not complete. Journalists noted that the list of pilots was reprinted by the Bars TV channel in the Russian city of Ivanovo, where the A-50Us were based. The media also noted that in previous years, Russian state channels reported on the A-50U aircraft under the command of Levchenko. Ivanovo media also reported on the participation of the A-50 aircraft under the command of Levchenko in the 2020 Moscow Victory Day Parade.

On January 19, 2024, the VChK-OGPU Telegram channel quoted Levchenko's wife, Victoria, who reported that her husband had last contacted her on January 13, and that he had been missing since then.

=== Other sources ===
In a January 17, 2024, report, the UK Ministry of Defence said British intelligence was "almost certain" that the A-50 had crashed over the Sea of Azov.

A 19 January 2024 UK Ministry of Defence intelligence report stated that Russia had begun flying another A-50 in the Sea of Azov region, flying significantly further from the frontline than previously, and that "Russia has tacitly acknowledged Ukraine’s downing of the A-50 aircraft."

== Claims ==
=== Ukrainian weapons ===
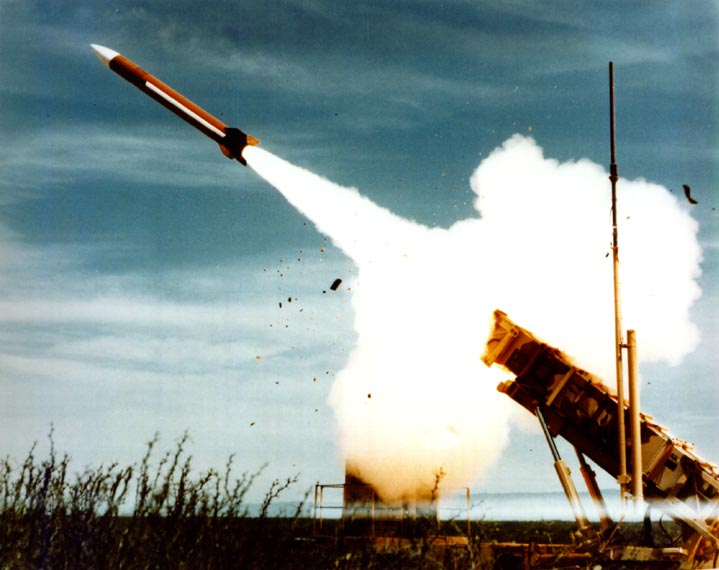
An American MIM-104 Patriot firing a PAC-2 missile, pictured in 2002.

Immediately after the publication of information about the destruction of two Russian aircraft, speculation began to arise about what weapons were used. It was assumed that the planes could have been shot down using MIM-104 Patriot's. However, journalists noted that it was previously known that Ukraine used PAC-3 missiles on Patriot launchers, which, although they work well against ballistic missiles, have a range of only 40 km. But even if Ukraine had used PAC-2 missiles, which can hit targets up to 100 miles away, in the A-50 situation even those missiles would have had to operate at the limit of their range, so they would have had to be near the front lines, which would have put the expensive Patriot system at risk. But all other air defense systems in service with Ukraine, both Soviet and Western types, had an even shorter range and would not have been able to hit Russian aircraft at such a distance.

British military expert Bryden Sporling noted that the Ukrainian S-300 missile system complex could have reached the Sea of Azov.

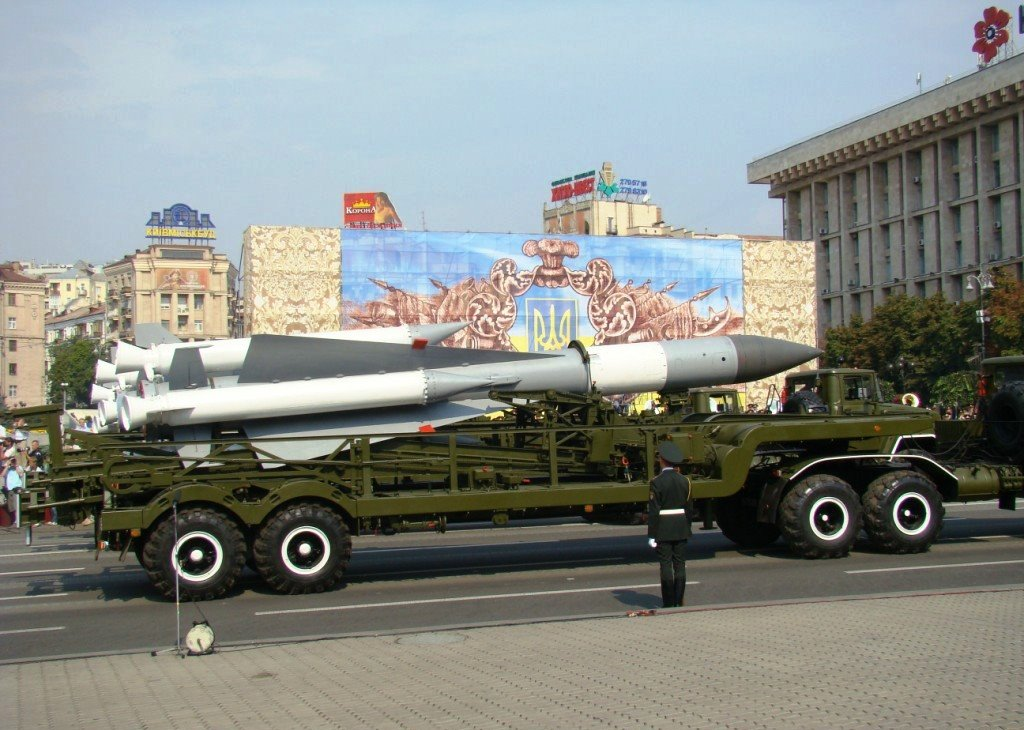
A Ukrainian S-200 missile system in Kyiv, pictured in 2008.

Journalists also suggested that the Ukrainian Armed Forces could theoretically use the old Soviet Union S-200 air defense systems, which were removed from service more than ten years ago, but during the Russian invasion, the Ukrainian Armed Forces began to use them to fire at ground targets. Journalists noted that if the Ukrainian military were able to restore the combat capability of the S-200, then theoretically their range of 600 km would allow them to hit the A-50, which is a large and poorly maneuverable aircraft that should have been a fairly easy target for such missiles.

Also, according to a number of commentators, the Ukrainians could theoretically use fighters with long-range aircraft missiles. However, the Ukrainian Air Force did not have such missiles for the Mikoyan MiG-29 and Sukhoi Su-27 fighters in service, and Ukraine had not yet received General Dynamics F-16 Fighting Falcons from Western countries. Journalists also noted that the A-50 itself, with the help of its radars, should have been able to detect such fighters, and when using the F-16, it should have recognized it by its characteristic signature.

According to military expert Tom Cooper, the Ukrainian Armed Forces carried out a complex operation to destroy the A-50 by luring it into a trap. According to Cooper, on January 13, Ukrainian Sukhoi Su-24s carried out a series of strikes on radars and air defense systems in Crimea, destroying several radar stations. Russian forces used the A-50 and Il-22M to compensate for the loss of the radar, deciding to launch retaliatory strikes against Ukraine with Sukhoi Su-34 aircraft, for this the flight path of the A-50 and Il-22 moved further north, closer to the front line, which is what Ukrainian forces expected. According to the expert, the S-300 system was used to destroy the plane in conjunction with the Patriot system, which did not turn on its radar until the last moment.

After the publication of a photograph of an Il-22M aircraft with a damaged tail section, journalists noted large holes in the tail, characteristic of hits from missile fragments from large ground-based air defense systems.

Journalists noted that the A-50 and Il-22 are large aircraft that are clearly visible on radar screens, and the A-50 itself is also a source of active radio emissions. And if these aircraft were flying on standard routes, this could allow the Ukrainian Armed Forces to prepare an ambush for them using air defense systems or fighters.

At the same time, American military analyst Rafi Cohen said: "We don't know what exactly shot down these planes. It could have been Ukrainian air defense, it could have been another plane, or it could have been sabotage."

Experts noted that Ukraine had already carried out similar operations Thus, in May 2023, Ukraine shot down several Russian planes and helicopters in Bryansk Oblast. And in December 2023, the Ukrainian Armed Forces announced the destruction of three Sukhoi Su-34 fighters at once.

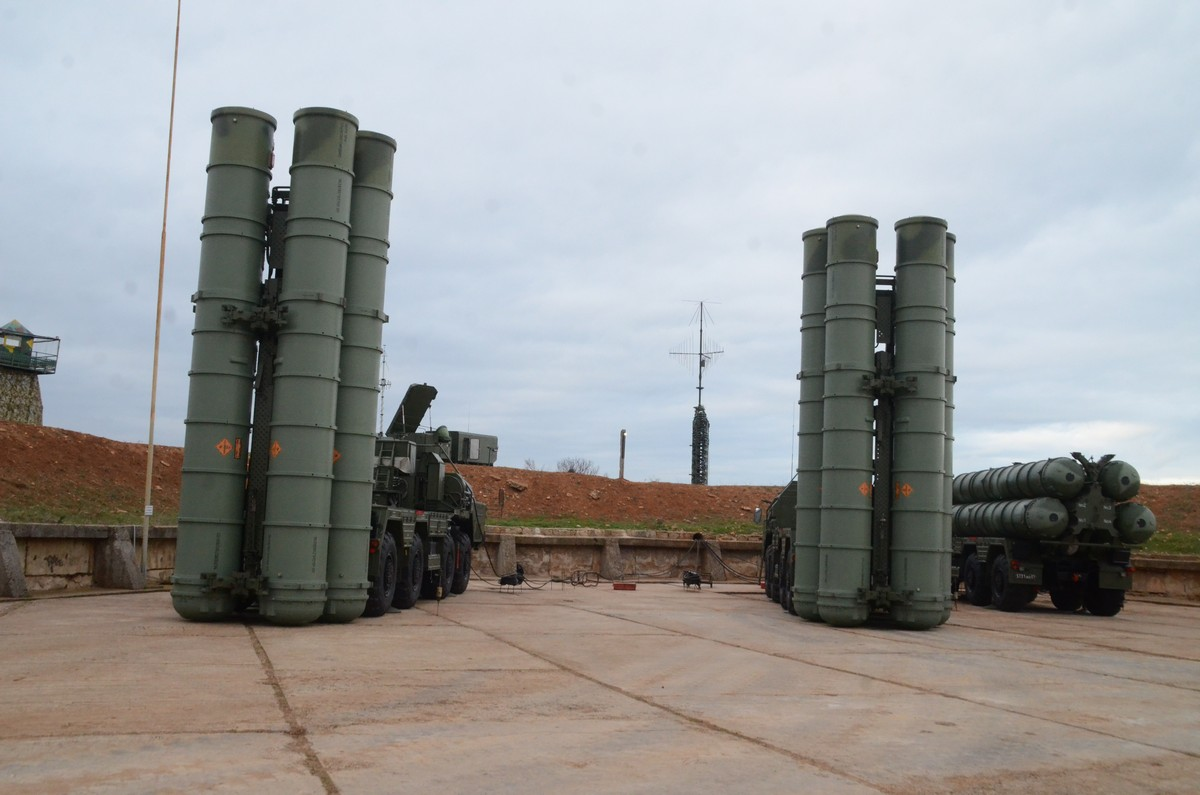
A Russian S-400 missile system on combat duty pictured in 2018.

=== Friendly fire from Russian air defense ===
Telegram channels Rybar and VChK-OGPU suggested that the incident could have occurred due to friendly fire from Russian air defense forces guarding the Crimean Bridge. Other Z-"war correspondents" such as Romanov, Boris Rozhin (Colonelcassad) and Yuri Kotenok also came out with this version. So, Kitten wrote: "Instead of a comment, just three letters - P.V.O." On January 16, Fighterbomber stated: "In the SVO, unfortunately, the most terrible and most dangerous enemy for the VKS has become our air defense. It always strikes in the back. It is impossible to protect yourself from it or somehow foresee or take it into account.

Military expert Kirill Mikhailov noted that he considers the "friendly fire" version to be probable. In his opinion, what happened can indeed be explained by inattention and errors in the organization of the activities of Russian air defense. He suggested that after the recent strikes on Crimea, the Russians could have increased their air defense forces on the peninsula, but that they forgot to tell the newly arrived "military personnel that, in fact, their own people are flying here too." He compared this situation to the downing of Ukraine International Airlines Flight 752, a Ukrainian Boeing 737 operated by Ukraine International Airlines, near Tehran, Iran in 2020, when, in anticipation of an American missile attack, the Islamic Revolutionary Guard Corps strengthened their air defense forces in the Tehran area, but the newly arrived military mistakenly shot down the plane that was on a scheduled Tehran-Kyiv flight.

Journalists from the BBC Russian Service noted that the S-400 missile systems deployed in the area of the Kerch Bridge could theoretically shoot down these aircraft in the Sea of Azov, but in their opinion, it would be difficult for air defense operators to confuse the Il-22M and especially the A-50 with any other targets.

However, Ukrainian military expert Alexander Kovalenko doubted the "friendly fire" version, noting that Russian planes had been flying the same routes for almost two years, but stated: "If it was friendly fire, it will go down in the world history of wars and conflicts as the loudest facepalm."

Ruslan Leviev from the Conflict Intelligence Team noted that cases of "friendly fire" by Russian air defense systems against their own aircraft are not uncommon in this war: the first such incident occurred on the very first day of the full-scale invasion, when a Russian Antonov An-24 was shot down over Russian territory.

== Reactions ==
Journalists and experts called the loss of the A-50 a major loss for the Russian Aerospace Forces, since Russia had a limited number of such aircraft. According to Forbes, Russia has only two serviceable A-50 aircraft left while the remaining six need modernization or major repairs.

American military analyst Rafi Cohen also called the destruction of the A-50 an important symbolic victory for the Ukrainians, significant beyond its purely military effect, comparing it to the sinking of the cruiser Moskva. At the same time, he noted that the destruction of one A-50 would not be able to change the course of the war as a whole. However, British expert Bryden Spoerling said "Not only has Russia lost a valuable and rare asset, but it will also put additional strain on the remaining aircraft if Russia wants to maintain the same rate of operation. And that will likely force Russia to keep these aircraft away, which will impact their effectiveness."

Rafi Cohen also noted that the destruction of the A-50 shows the ability of the Ukrainians to effectively use Western military aid.

Austrian military expert Markus Reisner called the destruction of the A-50 an "impressive success" that has a significant informational effect against the backdrop of crises in other regions of the world, comparing this success of the Ukrainians with the Ukrainian Armed Forces’ strike on a submarine in Crimea.

== See also ==
- 2024 Korochansky Ilyushin Il-76 crash
