= OPK =

OPK may refer to:

- Oak Park railway station, Melbourne, Australia (Metro Trains station code)
- Olli-Pekka Kallasvuo, former CEO of Nokia
- Ovulation prediction kit
- United Instrument Manufacturing Corporation (Russian: Объединённая приборостроительная корпорация)
