= Beriev A-100 =

Russian AEW&C aircraft under development

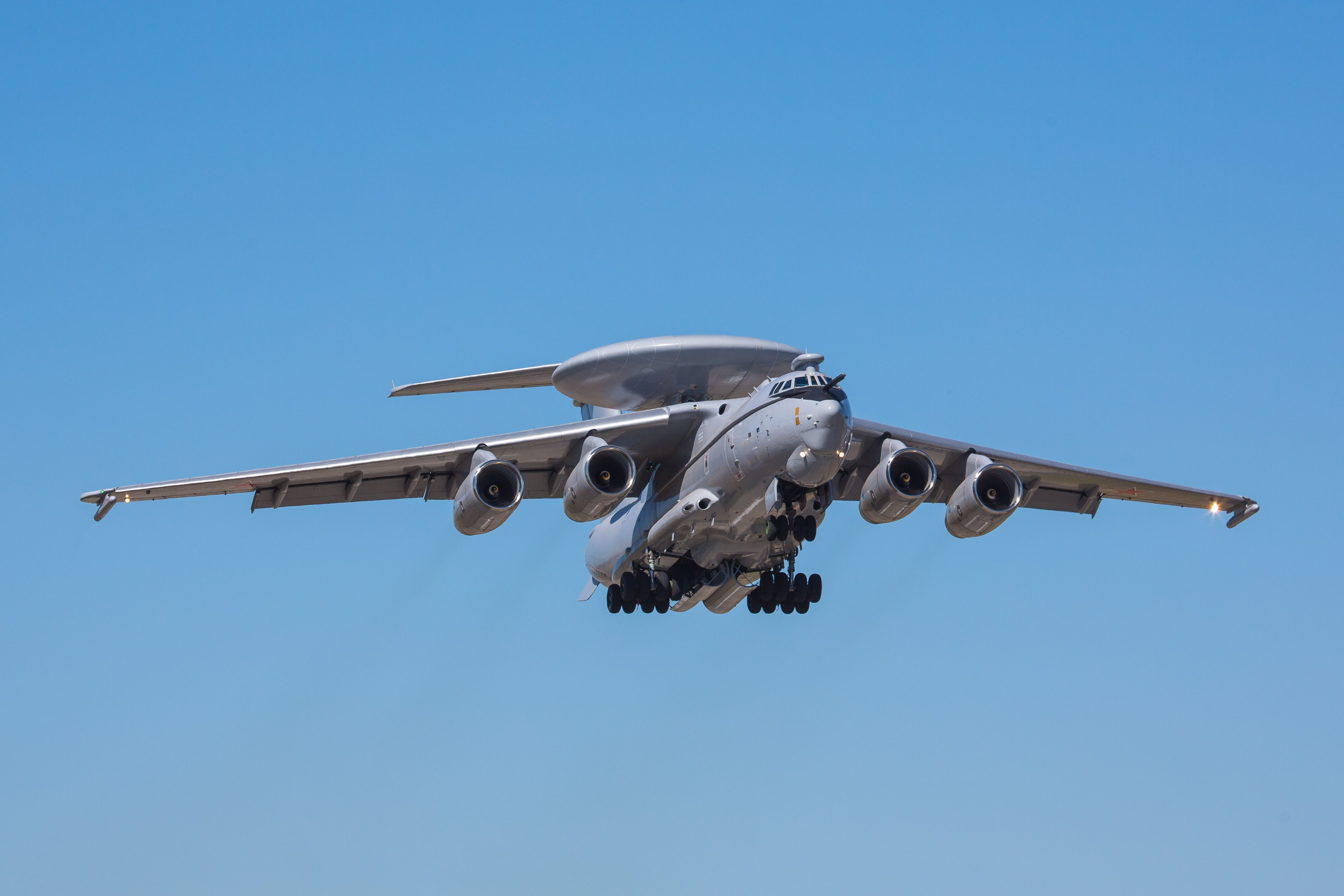
- A-100 in flight

General information
- Type: Airborne early warning and control
- Manufacturer: Beriev / JSC Vega
- Status: Planned to military service; in service
- Primary user: Russian Aerospace Forces
- Number built: 2 (1 A-100LL, 1 A-100)

History
- Introduction date: Not yet in service
- First flight: 18 November 2017
- Developed from: Ilyushin Il-76MD-90A
- Predecessors: Beriev A-50

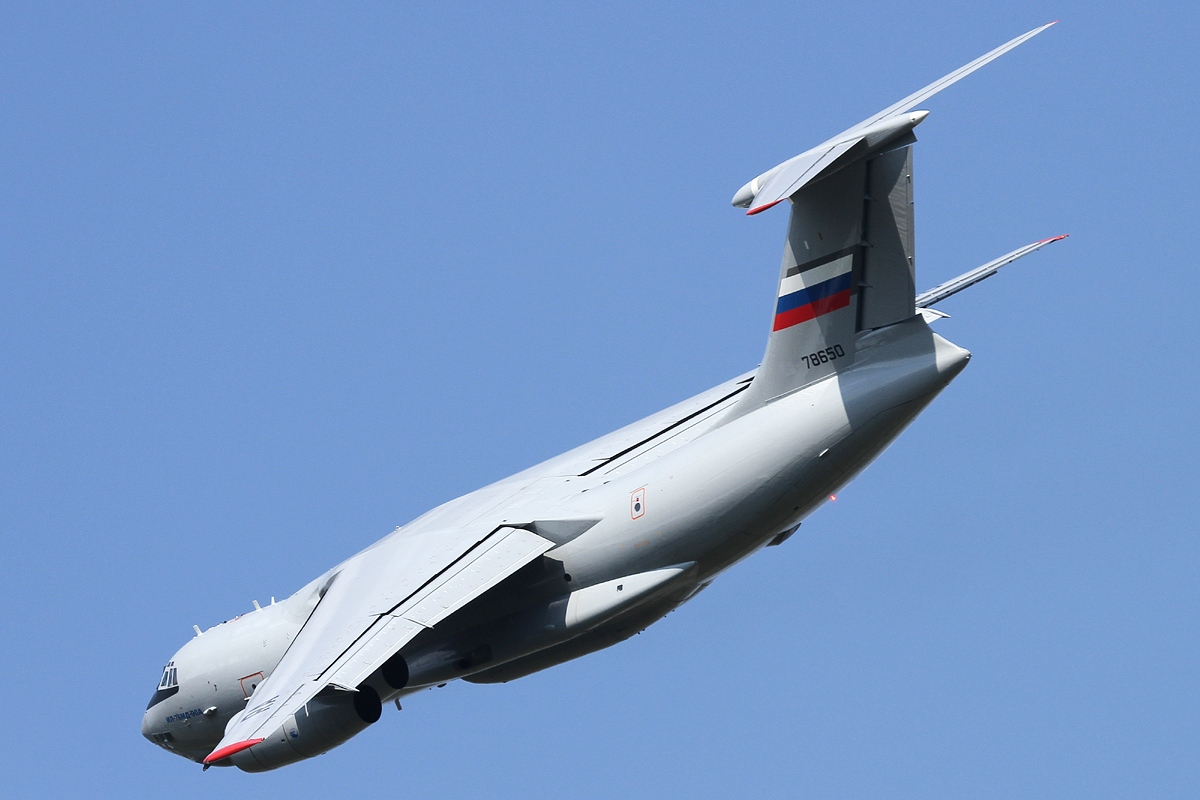
An Ilyushin Il-76MD-90A, on which the Beriev A-100 is based

The Beriev A-100 is a Russian-built airborne early warning and control (AEW&C) aircraft based on the Il-76MD-90A transport aircraft. This aircraft is developed to replace the Beriev A-50 in Russian Aerospace Forces service. Avionics and configuration will be similar to the A-50U, but with a new Vega Premier Active Phased Array Radar.

== Design and development ==
The A-100 is also known as the Izdeliye PM, and is planned to reinforce and then replace Russia's current fleet of Beriev A-50 AEW&C aircraft. Its development contract was signed in 2006 with the Vega Radio Engineering Corporation. The aircraft is based on the improved Il-76MD-90A (Il-476), which is equipped with new PS-90A-76 turbofan engines that are 15% more powerful than the D-30KP used by the Il-76. The external shape of the A-100 will be similar to the A-50, with the main radar array housed in a rotating dome mounted on two struts above the fuselage. The new Vega Premier AESA radar in the dome will have electronic steering in elevation while azimuth is controlled by the rotation of the dome. The array would rotate once every 5 seconds, thus improving the radar's ability to track fast moving targets. In addition to the new radar, the A-100 will have a new electronic warfare suite, a new navigation system, and new communication systems, including a satellite communication antenna.

It can detect aerial targets more than 600 kilometres (370 mi) away and warships nearly 400 kilometres (250 mi) away.

A flying laboratory, designated A-100LL and based on an A-50 airframe, was used to test the operation of the A-100's systems and help with their conception. It first flew on 21 April 2017.

In April 2020, it was said by a source in the Russian military industry that Russia's Aerospace Forces would begin taking delivery of the new Beriev A-100 in 2024, to complement and eventually replace the existing Beriev A-50 and A-50U AEW planes in the Aerospace Forces' inventory.

In February 2022, The Drive claimed that sanctions placed on Russia had delayed the project.

On 9 February 2022 the A-100 made its first flight with a radar turned on.

On 25 November 2025, Ukraine claimed to have destroyed the A-100LL prototype, with satellite images showing the scorched aircraft. The aircraft had no electronic equipment on board as it had been transferred to an A-100.

== Specifications (Il-476) ==
General characteristics

- Length: 46.59 m (152 ft 10 in)
- Wingspan: 50.5 m (165 ft 8 in)
- Height: 14.76 m (48 ft 5 in)
- Wing area: 300 m^{2} (3,200 sq ft)
- Powerplant: 4 × Aviadvigatel PS-90-76 turbofan engines, 142 kN (32,000 lbf) thrust each

Performance

- Maximum speed: 900 km/h (560 mph, 490 kn)
- Maximum speed: Mach 0.82

== See also ==
Related development

- Ilyushin Il-76
- KJ-2000
- DRDO AWACS

Aircraft of comparable role, configuration, and era

- E-3 Sentry (Block G)
- KJ-3000
