= Borisoglebsk-2 =

Russian electronic warfare system

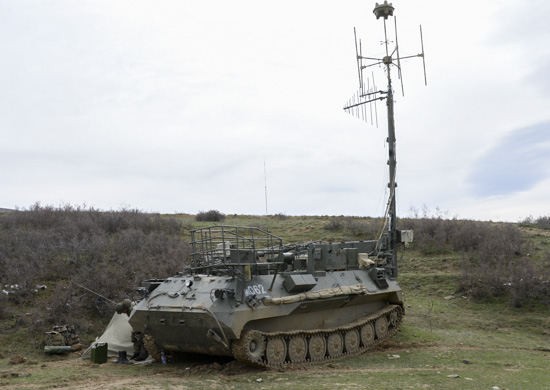
Baseline Borisoglebsk-2 electronic warfare system

The Borisoglebsk 2 (Note: Or Borisoglebsk-2.) is a Russian, MT-LBu ground vehicle mounted, multi-functional electronic warfare (EW) weapon system. It was developed by Sozvezdie over a six-year period, from 2004 to 2010. The system was however not ordered, or for other reasons not manufactured or delivered, at once to the Russian military. Starting in February 2015, it has been manufactured and delivered by UIMC to the Russian Armed Forces. It is designed to disrupt communications and GPS systems. Borisoglebsk 2 achieved initial operating capability in 2010, but was not ordered and delivered to Russian military until February 2015. Rossiyskaya Gazeta reported that Borisoglebsk 2 was the core system for electronic warfare in the Russian Army, controlling four types of jamming units from a single point.

Experimentation and testing were conducted after the first deliveries to the Russian armed forces. The system was in active use by the summer of 2015, in eastern Ukraine. US advisers sent to Ukraine have learned about Russian electronic warfare from the Ukrainian Army, though Ukraine never has had access to this new EW-technology. The American advisers are nevertheless impressed even with earlier Russian EW-technology in the hands of the Ukrainian Army.

Swedish newspaper Svenska Dagbladet claimed that the United States and NATO are worried that the F-35 fighter aircraft may not stand up against new Russian EW systems. Borisoglebsk 2 was given as an example of a new Russian system, but not directly compared to the F-35.

As of August 2015, ten sets of this system have been delivered to the Russian armed forces with another 14 sets to follow. According to Rostec, Russia plans to deploy them along the Russian borders "from Kaliningrad to Blagoveshchensk".

As of October 2015, these systems are also rumored to be active in Syria.

On 21 September 2016, more than 10 Borisoglebsk 2 and Rtut-BM EW systems were delivered to the Russian army. New deliveries took place in the first half of 2017.

On 26 January 2022 as a part of the buildup to their 2022 invasion of Ukraine, the Russian army confirmed the deployment of Borisoglebsk-2 units to the Vistula Motorized Rifle Division of the Western Military District in the Belgorod Region (close to the border with Ukraine) in order to “reduce the time needed to obtain necessary information [about military movements].”

On 28 February 2022, Ukrainian civilians attacked a Borisoglebsk 2 with a molotov cocktail while it was being towed during the 2022 Russian invasion of Ukraine. Ukraine has claimed to have captured at least one Borisoglebsk 2, destroyed one in October 2023, and destroyed two more in November 2023.

== See also ==
- Anti-radiation missile
- Electronic counter-countermeasure
- Electronic warfare support measures
