= BOZ counter-measures pod =

Swedish aircraft equipment pod

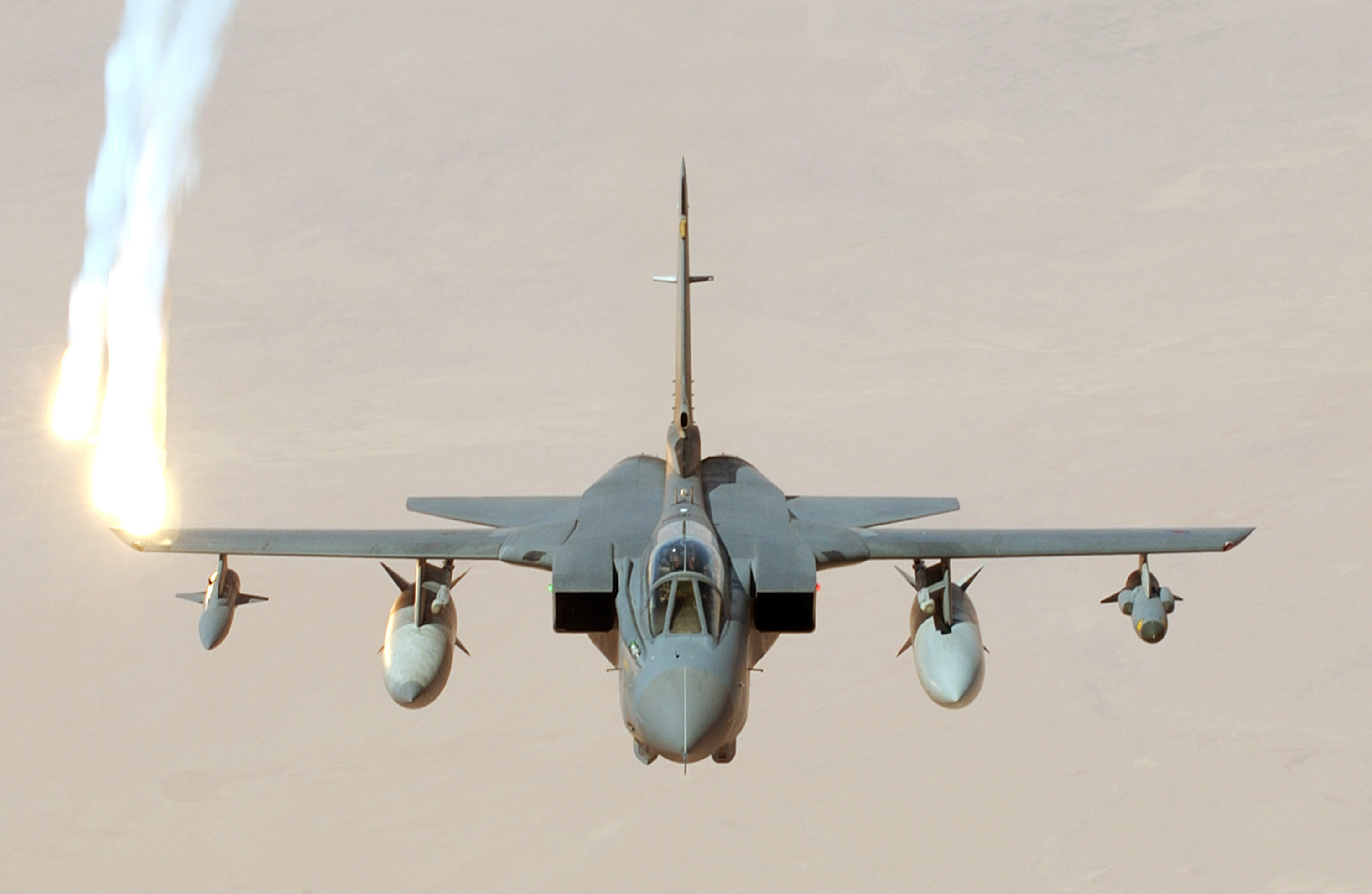
RAF Tornado releases flares from a BOZ-107 pod in August 2004

BOZ is a SAAB-manufactured under-wing radar-guided and heat-seeking (infrared homing) missile counter-measures pod. It can be equipped with chaff-dispensing, flares and electronic counter-measures and threat analysis capabilities. It has been fitted to the Panavia Tornado.

== Components ==
The flares contained, to divert heat-seeking missiles, are 55mm No.4 Mk.2 Type1 flares, manufactured by the British company Chemring.

== Variants ==
- Swedish version is called BOX-9 or KB (pod type B)
- German version is called BOZ-101 (for Tornado IDS and ECR)
- Italian version is called BOZ-102 (for Tornado IDS and ECR) and an enhanced version, the BOZ-102EC (Enhanced Capability)
- French version is called BOZ-103
- British version is called BOZ-107

== See also ==
- Sky Shadow, radar countering, also carried by the Panavia Tornado
