= Chirok =

Russian hybrid amphibious unmanned aerial vehicle

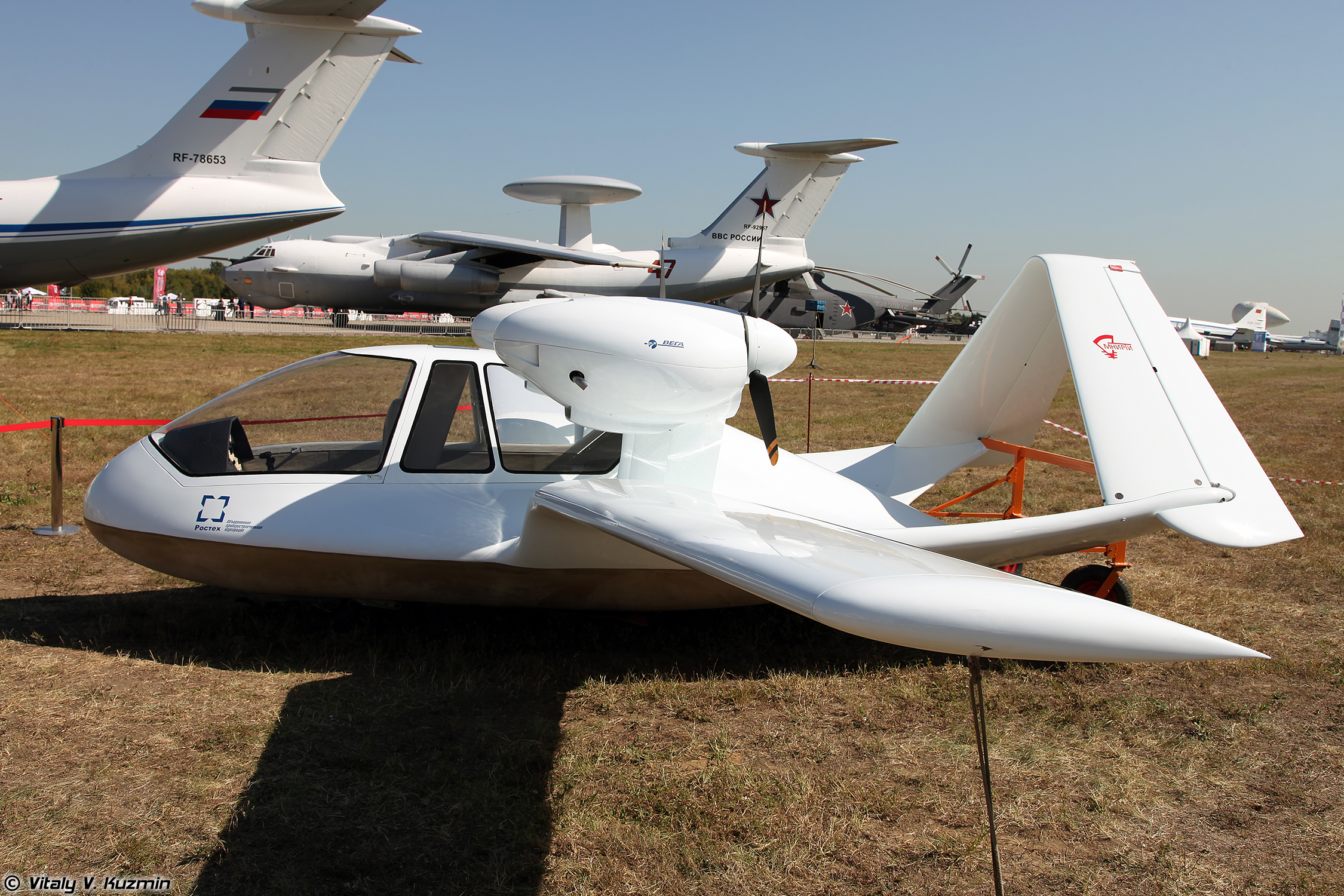
Chirok UAV at the MAKS Airshow 2015

The Chirok (Russian: чирок – "Teal") is a Russian hybrid amphibious UAV vehicle in development by United Instrument Manufacturing Corporation, a Rostec subsidiary. The drone was presented in the Innoprom 2014 technology exhibition in Yekaterinburg for the first time. This machine is a hybridized and amphibious like UAV meaning it doesn't need an airfield for launching, similar how helicopters work according to Aleksey Smirnov, the head of the unmanned aerial vehicles department at Radio-Technical Institute.

It is expected that at Moscow-hosted MAKS Air Show 2015 the UAV Chirok will be presented as an operational prototype. The production of this aircraft could start as early as in the year of 2016.

== Data & performance ==
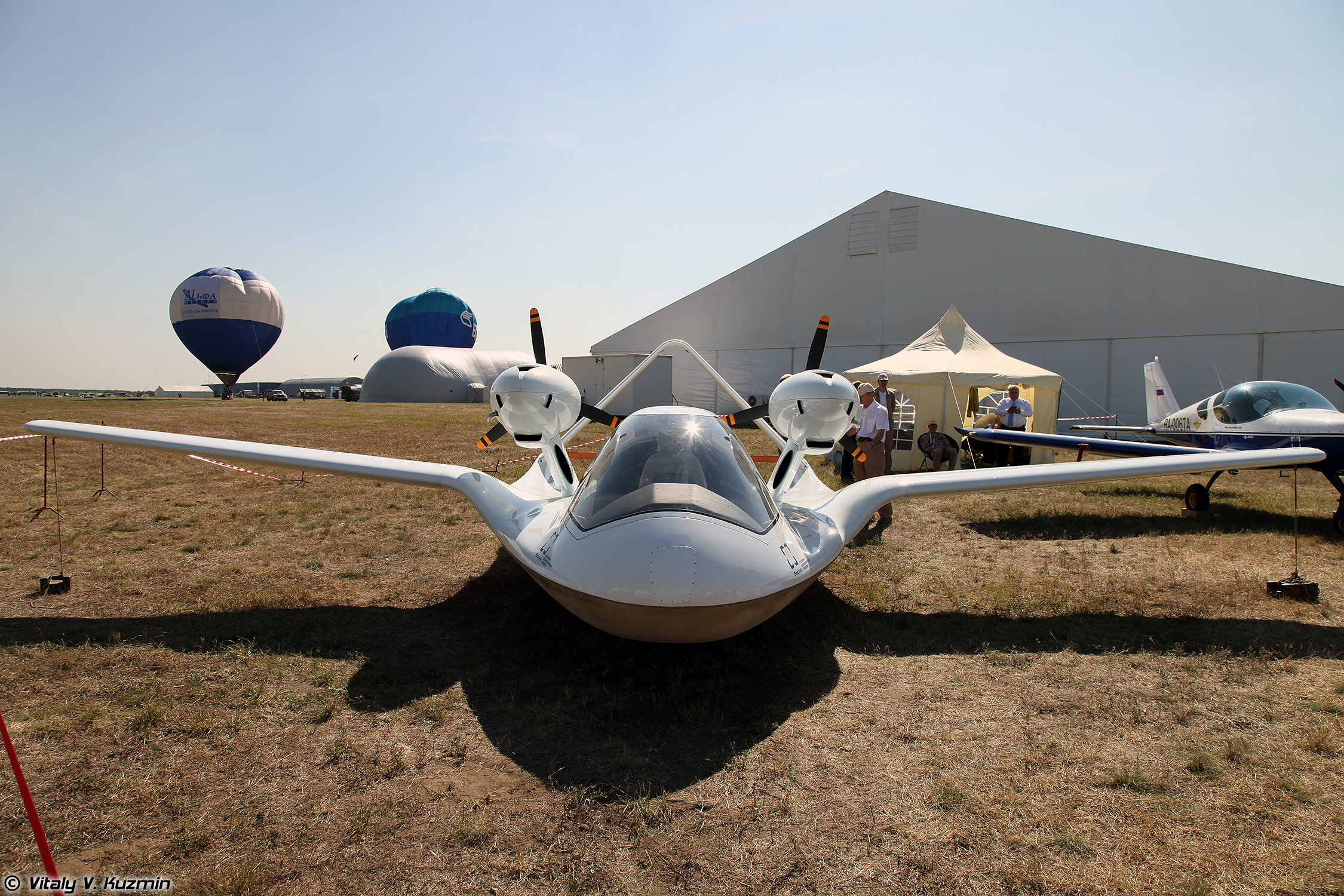
Front view of Chirok UAV at the MAKS Airshow 2015

The first flight tests for the Chirok aircraft will start in 2015. Reports show it will have a wingspan of 10 meters and have a maximum takeoff mass of approximately 700 kilograms, of which 661 pounds (300 kg) would be its effective payload. Maximum altitude was stated to be in excess of 19,500 feet (5,900 m) and the Drone is expected to travel up to 2,500 kilometers on one single fuelling. The material of this device is made exclusively of composite materials and the fabric of its air cushion was developed in Russia and is patented by Rostec, the air cushion is fully retractable in flight mode.

The developers plan to use the drone for reconnaissance and wild fire monitoring missions, delivery of necessities to distant oil rigs and other things, it also enables carrying offensive military appliances.

Chirok can be equipped with high precision weapons like small-size guided missiles. Unlike most existing military drones, the Chirok will enough inner space to fit the weapons internally according to reports.
