= Vega Radio Engineering Corporation =

Russian company specializing in military surveillance radio systems

- Company type: joint-stock company
- Industry: aerospace
- Founded: 1944
- Headquarters: Moscow, Russia
- Key people: V. S. Verba, director and general designer
- Owner: Russian Federation
- Parent: UIMC (Rostec)
- Website: vega.su

JSC Vega Radio Engineering Corporation (Russian: АО «Концерн радиостроения «Вега», earlier CKB-17, NII-17, MNIIP) is a Russian company specializing in military radar and surveillance and C&C systems for ground-based, airborne and space systems like A-50, Almaz-1 and UAVs. Headquarters located in Moscow at 34, Kutuzovsky Prospekt.

== Overview ==
The company has been founded as CKB-17 (Russian: ЦКБ-17) on October 1, 1944 by the Decree of State Defense Committee of USSR. It develops terrestrial, air and space surveillance systems, including unmanned aerial vehicles (UAV). It also manufactures civilian products, such as air traffic control equipment.

Vega's flagship product is the Tipchak mobile aerial system for reconnaissance and target designation. The system operates up to six UAVs launched from a pneumatic catapult. Each UAV has a range of 40 kilometers (25 mi) and a 3-hour endurance. It can provide targeting for artillery and theater-based ballistic missiles at distances up to 350 km (217 mi). The first Tipchak system entered service with the Russian Armed Forces in 2008.

In 2007, the company's revenue was $185 million. Export share was 2.3% and share of civilian production was 10.2% The company is headquartered in Moscow and has 8,981 employees.

Founded in 1944 as The Moscow Scientific Research Institute of Instrument Engineering (MNIIP), the company has during its history developed radio electronic equipment, airborne radars for early warning and control systems, including that for the A-50 airplane; space- and airborne synthetic aperture radars for earth surveillance, including those for the Almaz spacecraft and the IMARK flying laboratory; multi- reflector precision antennas; super-accurate radiometers, doppler aircraft navigation sensors, medical equipment, computer-aided design systems, opto-electronic devices and other electronic means.

Tikhomirov Scientific Research Institute of Instrument Design was created in Zhukovskiy on March 1, 1955 as a branch of the Moscow NII-17 and reorganized into an independent structure in February 1956.

== Structure ==
Includes a number of enterprises and scientific research institutes:

- Vega (Moscow)
- Vega branch at St. Petersburg
- Vega branch at Taganrog
- NII Kulon (research institute "Coulomb", development and creation of radar, Moscow)
- KB Luch (UAV design bureau, Rybinsk)
- RZP (radio factory, Rybinsk)
- NPP Rubin (auto control systems, tele- and radiocommunications, Penza)
- ChRZ Polet (radio factory, Chelyabinsk)
- IMC Vega (Engineering-Marketing Center, Moscow)
- VNII Etalon — liquidated, came to Sozvezdie 30 Dec. 2021
- MNIIS (research institute of communications, Moscow)
- NII Vector (radio research institute, St. Petersburg)
- AO Pilot Plant Integral (radio factory, St. Petersburg)
- AO Plant Energia (radio factory, St. Petersburg)
- AO DKBA (airships and balloons creation, Dolgoprudny)
- MNIRTI (radio research, Moscow)
- MRTI of Russian Academy of Sciences (radio research, Moscow)
- NIITAP (Institute of Technology and Production Automation, Zelenograd)
- AO KNIITMU (communication equipment, Kaluga)
- NII Argon, SKB Topaz, NICEVT
