= Electronic warfare =

Combat involving electronics and directed energy

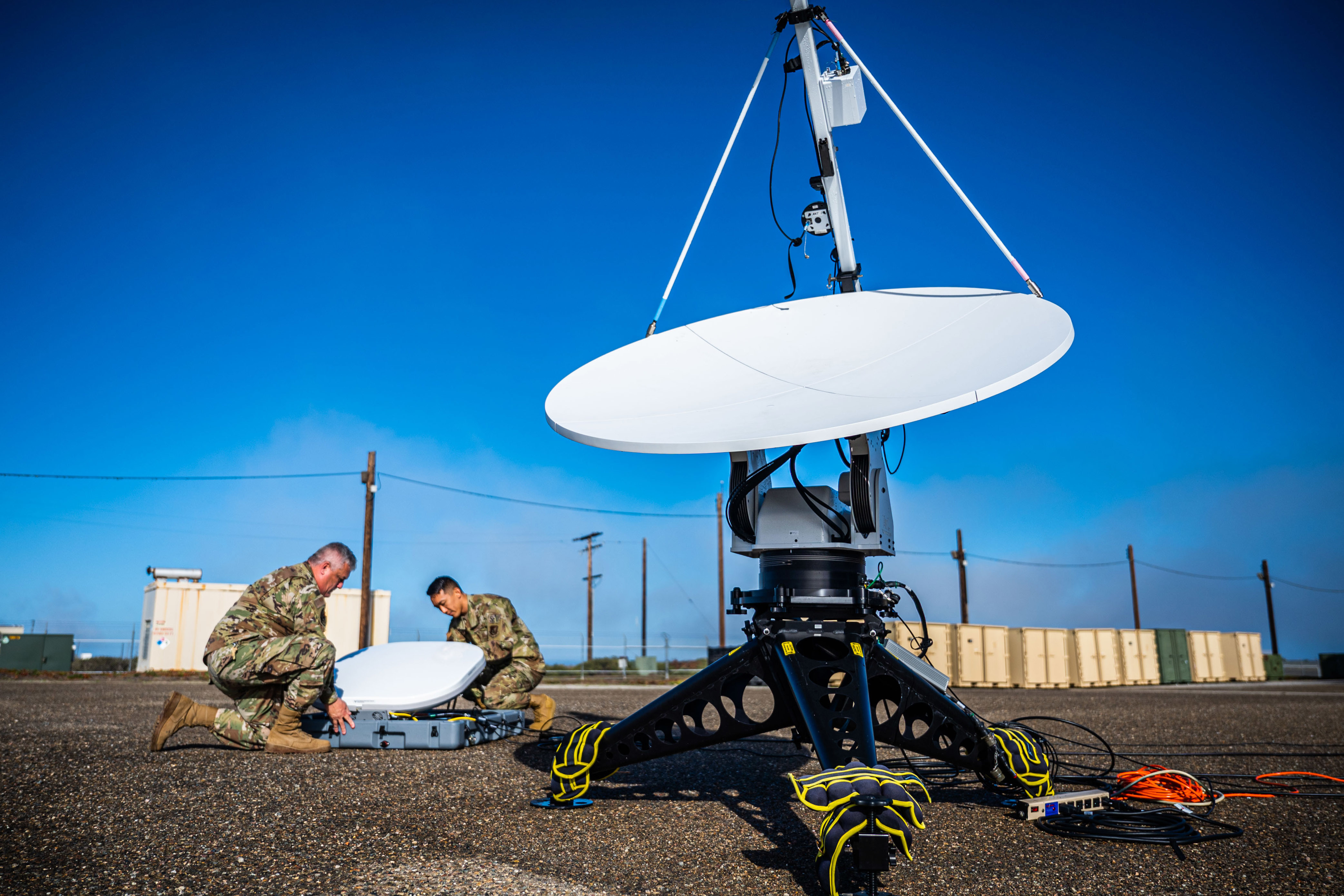
United States Space Force personnel operating a satellite antenna during an electromagnetic warfare military exercise

Electronic warfare or electromagnetic warfare (EW) is warfare involving the use of the electromagnetic spectrum (EM spectrum) or directed energy to control the spectrum, attack an enemy, or impede enemy operations. The purpose of electromagnetic warfare is to deny the opponent the advantage of—and ensure friendly unimpeded access to—the EM spectrum. Electromagnetic warfare can be applied from air, sea, land, or space by crewed and uncrewed systems and can target communication, radar, or other military and civilian assets.

== The electromagnetic environment ==
Military operations are executed in an information environment increasingly complicated by the electromagnetic spectrum. The electromagnetic spectrum portion of the information environment is referred to as the electromagnetic environment (EME). The recognized need for military forces to have unimpeded access to and use of the electromagnetic environment creates vulnerabilities and opportunities for electronic warfare in support of military operations.

Within the information operations construct, EW is an element of information warfare; more specifically, it is an element of offensive and defensive counterinformation.

NATO has a different and arguably more encompassing and comprehensive approach to EW. A military committee conceptual document from 2007, MCM_0142 Nov 2007 Military Committee Transformation Concept for Future NATO Electronic Warfare, recognised the EME as an operational maneuver space and warfighting environment/domain. In NATO, EW is considered to be warfare in the EME. NATO has adopted simplified language which parallels those used in other warfighting environments like maritime, land, and air/space. For example, an electronic attack (EA) is offensive use of EM energy, electronic defense (ED), and electronic surveillance (ES). The use of the traditional NATO EW terms, electronic countermeasures (ECM), electronic protective measures (EPM), and electronic support measures (ESM) has been retained as they contribute to and support electronic attack (EA), electronic defense (ED) and electronic surveillance (ES). Besides EW, other EM operations include intelligence, surveillance, target acquisition and reconnaissance (ISTAR), and signals intelligence (SIGINT). Subsequently, NATO has issued EW policy and doctrine and is addressing the other NATO defense lines of development.

Primary EW activities have been developed over time to exploit the opportunities and vulnerabilities that are inherent in the physics of EM energy. Activities used in EW include electro-optical, infrared and radio frequency countermeasures; EM compatibility and deception; radio jamming, radar jamming and deception and electronic counter-countermeasures (or anti-jamming); electronic masking, probing, reconnaissance, and intelligence; electronic security; EW reprogramming; emission control; spectrum management; and wartime reserve modes.

== Subdivisions ==
Electronic warfare consists of three major subdivisions: electronic attack (EA), electronic protection (EP), and electronic warfare support (ES).

=== Electronic attack ===
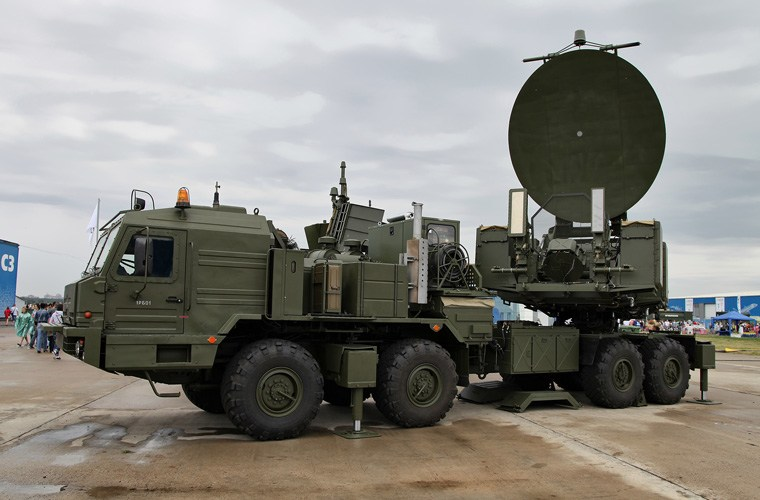
Krasukha, a Russian mobile, ground-based, electronic warfare (EW) system used to jam AWACS and airborne radars on radar-guided missiles

Electronic attack (EA), also known as electronic countermeasures (ECM), involves the offensive use of electromagnetic energy weapons, directed energy weapons, or anti-radiation weapons to attack personnel, facilities, or equipment with the intent of degrading, neutralizing, or destroying enemy combat capability including human life. In the case of electromagnetic energy, this action is most commonly referred to as "jamming" and can be performed on communications systems or radar systems. In the case of anti-radiation weapons, this often includes missiles or bombs that can home in on a specific signal (radio or radar) and follow that path directly to impact, thus destroying the system broadcasting.

In November 2021, Israel Aerospace Industries announced a new electronic warfare system named Scorpius that can disrupt radar and communications from ships, UAVs, and missiles simultaneously and at varying distances.

On 8 September 2024, Russian drones entered both Romanian and Latvian airspace. Romania scrambled two F-16s to monitor one of the drones, which landed "in an uninhabited area" near Periprava, according to the Romanian Ministry of Defence. The drone that entered Latvian airspace from Belarus crashed near Rezekne. This comes as the ISW noted increased success in Ukrainian Electronic Warfare against Russian drones that resulted in "several Russian Shahed drones (that) recently failed to reach their intended targets for unknown reasons." Two Kh-58s also reportedly failed to reach their targets.

=== Electronic protection ===
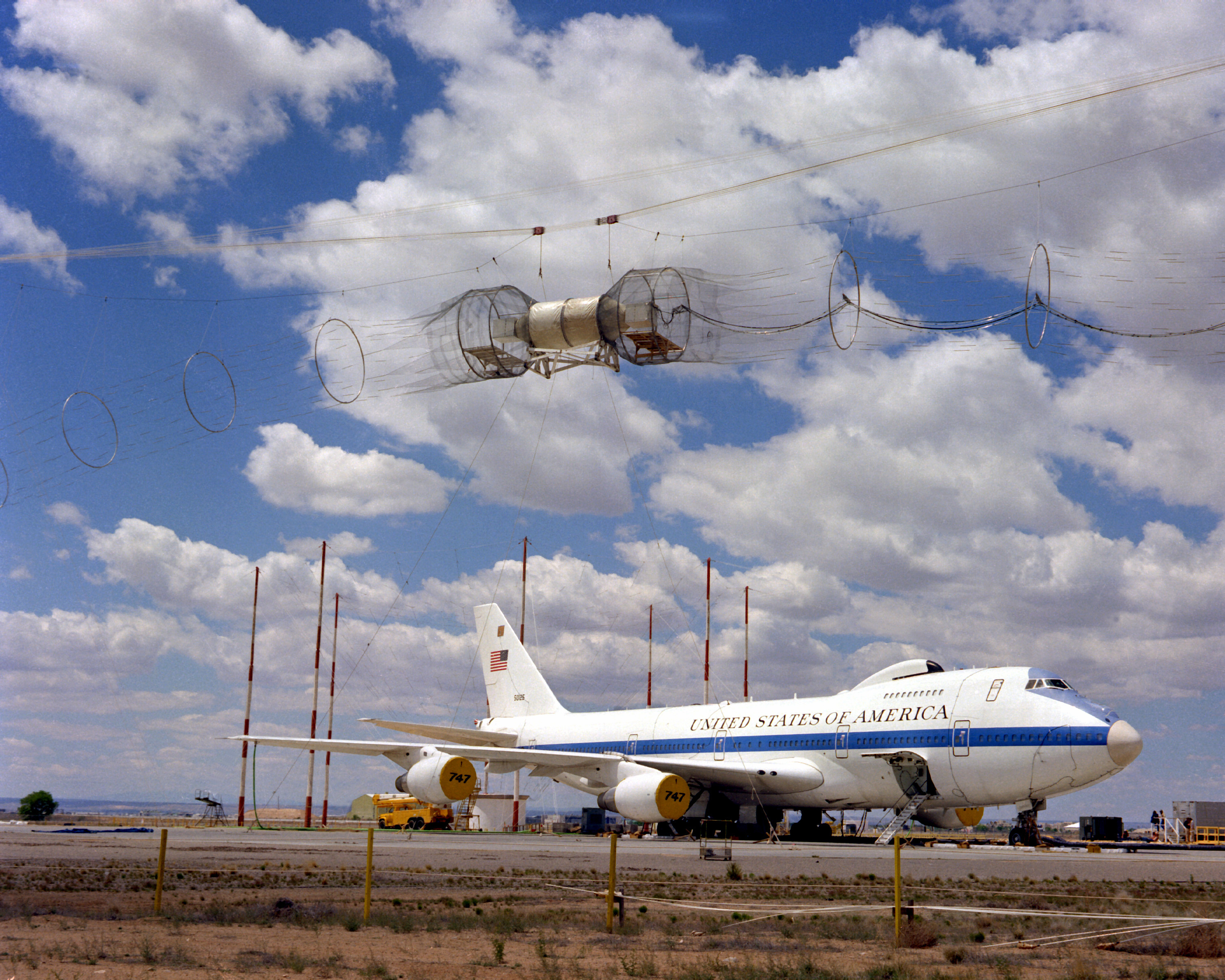
A right front view of a USAF Boeing E-4 advanced airborne command post (AABNCP) on the electromagnetic pulse (EMP) simulator (HAGII-C) for testing

Electronic protection (EP), also known as an electronic protective measure (EPM) or electronic counter-countermeasure (ECCM) are a measure used to protect against an electronic enemy attack (EA) or to protect against friendly forces who unintentionally deploy the equivalent of an electronic attack on friendly forces. (sometimes called EW fratricide). The effectiveness of electronic protection (EP) level is the ability to counter an electronic attack (EA).

Flares are often used to distract infrared homing missiles into missing their target. The use of flare rejection logic in the guidance (seeker head) of an infrared homing missile to counter an adversary's use of flares is an example of EP. While defensive EA actions (jamming) and EP (defeating jamming) both protect personnel, facilities, capabilities, and equipment, EP protects from the effects of EA (friendly and/or adversary). Other examples of EP include spread spectrum technologies, the use of restricted frequency lists, emissions control (EMCON), and low observability (stealth) technology.

Electronic warfare self-protection (EWSP) is a suite of countermeasure systems fitted primarily to aircraft for the purpose of protecting the host from weapons fire and can include, among others: directional infrared countermeasures (DIRCM, flare systems and other forms of infrared countermeasures for protection against infrared missiles; chaff (protection against radar-guided missiles); and DRFM decoy systems (protection against radar-targeted anti-aircraft weapons).

An electronic warfare tactics range (EWTR) is a practice range that provides training for personnel operating in electronic warfare. There are two examples of such ranges in Europe: one at RAF Spadeadam in the northwest county of Cumbria, England, and the Multinational Aircrew Electronic Warfare Tactics Facility Polygone range on the border between Germany and France. EWTRs are equipped with ground-based equipment to simulate electronic warfare threats that aircrew might encounter on missions. Other EW training and tactics ranges are available for ground and naval forces as well.

Antifragile EW is a step beyond standard EP, occurring when a communications link being jammed actually increases in capability as a result of a jamming attack, although this is only possible under certain circumstances such as reactive forms of jamming.

=== Electronic warfare support ===
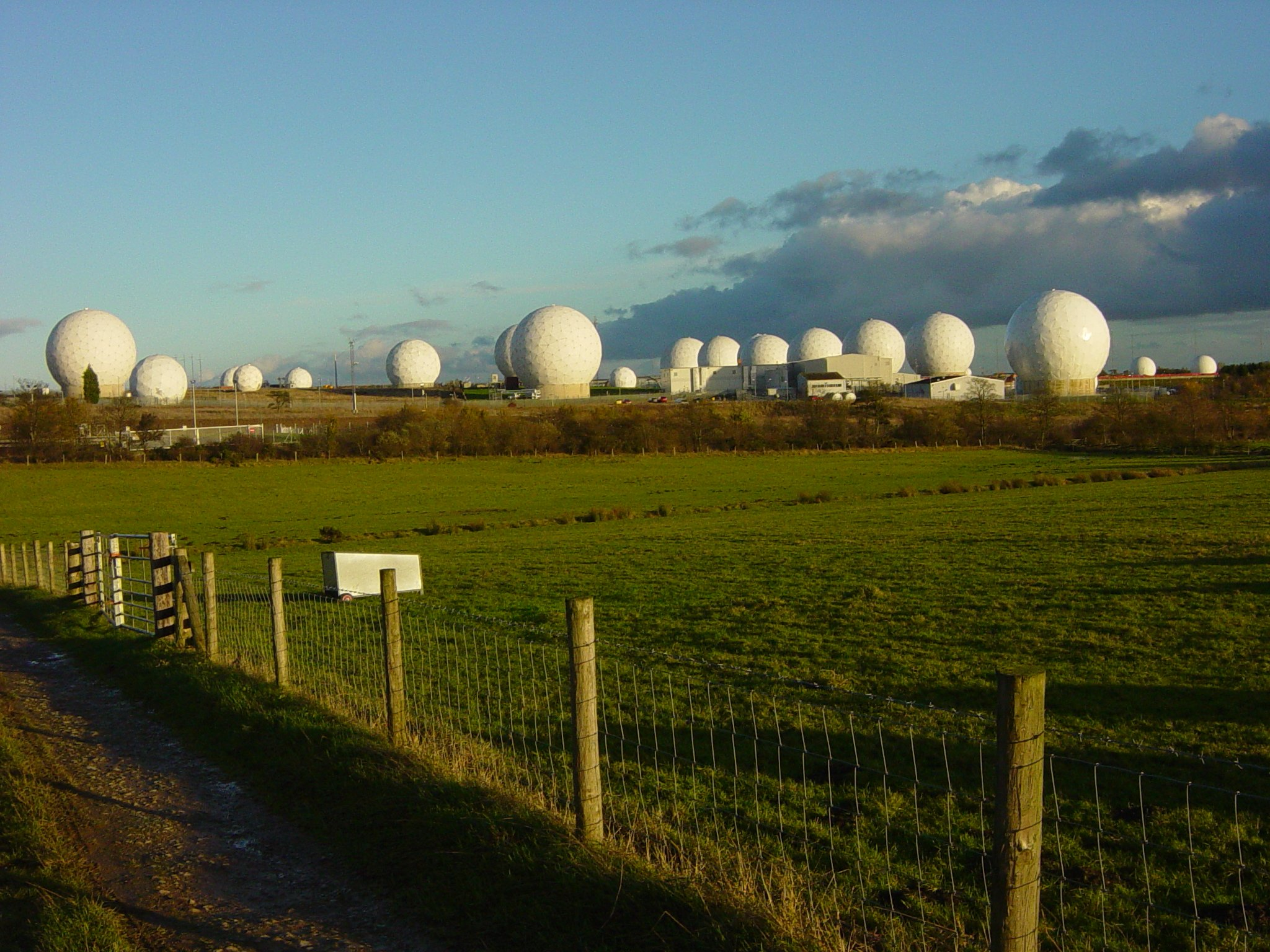
RAF Menwith Hill, a large ECHELON site in the United Kingdom, and part of the UK-USA Security Agreement

Electronic warfare support (ES) is a subdivision of EW involving actions taken by an operational commander or operator to detect, intercept, identify, locate, and/or localize sources of intended and unintended radiated electromagnetic (EM) energy. These Electronic Support Measures (ESM) aim to enable immediate threat recognition focuses on serving military service needs even in the most tactical, rugged, and extreme environments. This is often referred to as simply reconnaissance, although today, more common terms are intelligence, surveillance and reconnaissance (ISR) or intelligence, surveillance, target acquisition, and reconnaissance (ISTAR). The purpose is to provide immediate recognition, prioritization, and targeting of threats to battlefield commanders.

Signals intelligence (SIGINT), a discipline overlapping with ES, is the related process of analyzing and identifying intercepted transmissions from sources such as radio communication, mobile phones, radar, or microwave communication. SIGINT is broken into two categories: electronic intelligence (ELINT) and communications intelligence (COMINT). Analysis parameters measured in signals of these categories can include frequency, bandwidth, modulation, and polarization.

The distinction between SIGINT and ES is determined by the controller of the collection assets, the information provided, and the intended purpose of the information. Electronic warfare support is conducted by assets under the operational control of a commander to provide tactical information, specifically threat prioritization, recognition, location, targeting, and avoidance. However, the same assets and resources that are tasked with ES can simultaneously collect information that meets the collection requirements for more strategic intelligence.

== History ==
The earliest documented use of EW was during the Second Boer War of 1899–1902. The British Army, when trying to relieve Ladysmith, under siege by the Boers, used a searchlight to "bounce" Morse code signals off the clouds. The Boers immediately spotted this and used one of their own searchlights in an attempt to jam the British signals. This was graphically described by Winston Churchill in his book London to Ladysmith via Pretoria.

The very first military attempts at radio jamming were reportedly made during exercises by the Royal Navy in 1902, and by the US Navy in 1903. Nonetheless, the first documented radio jamming was reportedly a civil one. During the 1901 America's Cup, journalists from the American Wireless Telephone and Telegraph Co (AWT&T) used a code to report the leading ship while occupying the frequency, thus preventing other present journalists from reporting the cup's winner, thereby gaining a considerable lead over other journalists in their reporting.

The first recorded wireless interception was performed by HMS Diana in the Suez Canal in 1904, which was capable of recording Russian telecommunications.

The first recorded attempt at wartime jamming happened during the Russo-Japanese War of 1904-1905. On 8 March 1904, as the Japanese Navy was attempting a long-distance bombardment of Port Arthur using cruisers with a "spotter" destroyer that radioed them ballistic corrections. A Russian radio operator, hearing the presence of communications, used his Spark-gap transmitter to attempt to drown out the communications, allegedly leading the Japanese to promptly retreat without having achieved their objectives.

During May 1905, Russian Admiral Zinovy Rozhestvensky was attempting to cross the Tsushima Strait to rejoin Vladivostok after having repaired some of his ships in Madagascar. The Russian Navy was spotted by the Japanese armed Merchantman Shinano Maru. The captain of the Russian warship Ural requested permission to disrupt the Japanese communications link by attempting to transmit a stronger radio signal, hoping to distort the Japanese signal at the receiving end. Rozhestvensky refused the advice and denied the Ural permission to radio jam the enemy, as it could have signaled the position of the Russian Fleet. He also refused to send scouting ships for the same reason. Rozhestvensky, for various reasons (principally lack of ammo and lack of sailor training against a Japanese fleet that was both better equipped and battle-hardened), wanted to reach Vladivostok without a fight, and persisted in ordering radio silence even when it became evident that the Russian Fleet had been spotted and that the Japanese Fleet was closing in. While it is doubtful that jamming the Japanese would have changed the outcome of the Battle of Tsushima that ensued, this hints at the fact that radio jamming was already a standard procedure by this time - as was wireless communication interception.

During World War II, the Allies and Axis Powers both extensively used EW, or what Winston Churchill referred to as the "Battle of the Beams": as navigational radars were used to guide bombers to their targets and back to their base, the first application of EW in WWII was to interfere with the navigational radars. Chaff was also introduced during WWII to confuse and defeat tracking radar systems.

As battlefield communication and radar technology improved, so did electronic warfare, which played a major role in several military operations during the Vietnam War. Aircraft on bombing runs and air-to-air missions often relied on EW to survive the battle, although many were defeated by Vietnamese ECCM.

Electronic Warfare was used extensively during the Gulf War, primarily by USAF and USN electronic attack aircraft such as the EF-111A and EA-6B to disrupt Iraq's large and capable SAM and GCI network.

In 2007, an Israeli attack on a suspected Syrian nuclear site during Operation Outside the Box (or Operation Orchard) used electronic warfare systems to disrupt Syrian air defenses while Israeli jets crossed much of Syria, bombed their targets, and returned to Israel undeterred. The target was a suspected nuclear reactor under construction near the Euphrates River, modeled after a North Korean reactor and supposedly financed with Iranian assistance. Some reports say Israeli EW systems deactivated all of Syria's air defense systems for the entire period of the raid.

In December 2010, the Russian Army deployed their first land-based multifunctional electronic warfare system known as Borisoglebsk 2, developed by Sozvezdie. Development of the system started in 2004 and evaluation testing successfully completed in December 2010. The Borisoglebsk-2 uses four different types of jamming stations on a single system. The Borisoglebsk-2 system is mounted on nine MT-LB armored vehicles and is intended to suppress mobile satellite communications and satellite-based navigation signals. This EW system is developed to conduct electronic reconnaissance and suppression of radio-frequency sources. In August 2015, the Swedish newspaper Svenska Dagbladet said its initial usage caused concern within NATO. A Russian blog described Borisoglebsk-2 thus:

The 'Borisoglebsk-2', when compared to its predecessors, has better technical characteristics: wider frequency bandwidth for conducting radar collection and jamming, faster scanning times of the frequency spectrum, and higher precision when identifying the location and source of radar emissions, and increased capacity for suppression.

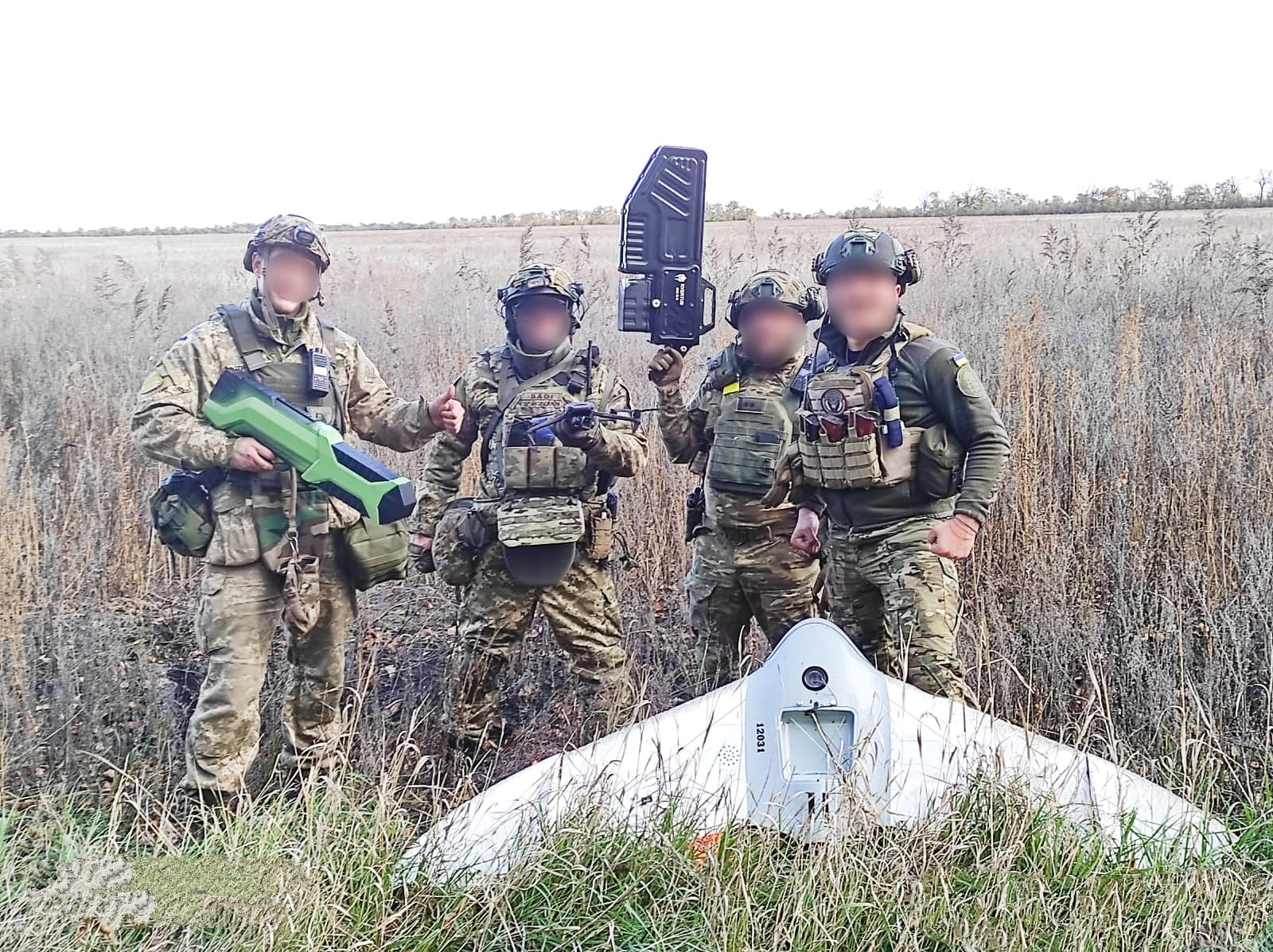
Ukrainian National Guard personnel display drone jammers and a downed Russian Grifon 12 drone in 2022.

During the first two days of the 2022 Russian invasion of Ukraine, Russian EW disrupted Ukraine's air defense radars and communications, severely disrupting Ukrainian ground-based air defense systems. Russian jamming was so effective it interfered with their own communications, so efforts were scaled back. This led to Ukrainian SAMs regaining much of their effectiveness, which began inflicting significant losses on Russian aircraft by the start of March 2022. Rapid Russian advances at the start of the war prevented EW troops from properly supporting the advancing troops, but by late March and April 2022, extensive jamming infrastructure had been deployed. EW complexes were set up in Donbas in concentrations of up to 10 complexes per 13 mi (21 km) of frontage. Electronic suppression of GPS and radio signals caused heavy losses of Ukrainian UAVs, depriving them of intelligence and precise artillery fire spotting. Small quadcopters had an average life expectancy of around three flights, and larger fixed-wing UAVs like the Bayraktar TB2 had a life expectancy of about six flights. By summer 2022, only some one-third of Ukrainian UAV missions could be said to have been successful, as EW had contributed to Ukraine losing 90% of the thousands of drones it had at the beginning of the invasion.

Russian EW capacity to disrupt GPS signals is credited with the reduction in the success of Ukrainian usage of HIMARS and JDAM bombs. The failure of GPS guidance forces these weapons, in particular JDAMS, to use inertial navigation system which reduces accuracy from around 5 metres (15 ft) down to around 27 metres (90 ft). In April 2026, reports emerged that Ukrainian F-16 pilots were being trained by the Royal Air Force to operate in GPS-denied environments. Pilots were trained in low-altitude visual navigation and terrain-based orientation methods intended to compensate for degraded satellite navigation systems.

Ukraine was losing some 10,000 drones a month due to Russian electronic warfare, according to a 19 May 2023 report by the Royal United Services Institute. This was an average of 300 drones a day. Russia has established EW posts about every 10 kilometres (6 mi) of the front, being some 6 kilometres (4 mi) back from the front line. In October 2023, The Economist reported that electronic warfare was in widespread use on front lines to impair small battlefield UAV activity, with Russia installing video feedback and control jammers on high-value equipment like tanks and artillery. By 11 March 2024, Ukraine reported it had destroyed a Russian Palantin EW system in Zaporizhzhia Oblast, which "suppress satellite radio navigation along the entire line of contact and in most parts of Ukraine, replacing the satellite radio navigation field (spoofing)". An estimated three Palantin systems have been hit (June 2022, February 2023, and March 2024). In addition to the Palantin, in Zaporizhzhia a Layer EW system was destroyed.

=== Cognitive Electronic Warfare (CEW) ===
Originating from digital EW, and as a continuation of software based modulation and demodulation, cognitive electronic warfare or cognitive electromagnetic warfare (CEW), is the use of AI in electronic warfare systems.

CEW is affecting all electronic warfare subdivisions, and can improve situation-assessment (SA) and ESM, through automatic detection and classification of new and unknown signals, signatures, and even RCS. Cognitive electronic warfare systems can be used to collect ESM data and assist augmenting, updating, and broadcasting (over JTIDS), real time maps with electronic order of battle (EOB) and electronic identification (EID) data. As well as the ability to adapt in real time to changes in the electromagnetic spectrum, by using artificial intelligence algorithms to quickly generate optimal EA, or EP solutions.

It can provide more comprehensive information to cryptologic technicians, by helping to select the jamming techniques that will be the most effective, and therefore provide faster and better ECM, or ECCM, decisions.

CEW is part of the Electromagnetic Spectrum Superiority Strategy (ESSS), published in October 2020, according to Lieutenant Commander Brian P. Gannon, U.S. Navy. DARPA has used CEW in some SIGINT studies with convolutional neural networks. DARPA had projects such as Blade, and ARC, which are related to R&D on CEW

== Popular culture ==
In 2026, US President Donald Trump described a secret weapon in the US arsenal that he called "the discombobulator", which he said was used in the 2026 United States intervention in Venezuela to jam electronic equipment used by the Venezuelan military. Analysts noted that what Trump described most likely does not exist as a single weapon, but rather as a system of weapons.

Trump later acknowledged that he made up the name "the discombobulator", because in his words, "everything was discombobulated".

== See also ==
- Cyberwarfare
- Electromagnetic pulse
- Electromagnetic interference
- Electronic harassment
- GPS jamming
- L3Harris Technologies
- Suppression of Enemy Air Defenses (SEAD)
- Drone warfare

Other electronic warfare systems:

- ADM-160 MALD
- Krasukha (electronic warfare system)
- Radar warning receiver (RWR)
- Samyukta electronic warfare system
- KORAL electronic warfare system
- Sky Shadow (radar)

Historic:

- 36th Electronic Warfare Squadron
- 55th Wing
- Battle of Latakia: the first recorded use of deception EW in a naval battle
- No. 100 Group RAF

U.S. specific:

- Association of Old Crows
- DARPA
- Electronic warfare officer
- Fleet Electronic Warfare Center
- Joint Functional Component Command – Network Warfare
- National Electronics Museum
- U.S. Marine Corps Radio Reconnaissance Platoon
- USACEWP (United States Army Computer Network Operations-Electronic Warfare Proponents)
