= Ruslan Leviev =

Russian military analyst (born 1986)

Ruslan Leonidovich Leviev (Russian: Руслан Леонидович Левиев, surname at birth - Karpuk; born August 22, 1986, in Bikin, Khabarovsk Krai, RSFSR, USSR) is a Russian opposition activist, military analyst and founder of the investigative group Conflict Intelligence Team.

== Biography ==
=== Early years ===
Ruslan Leonidovich Leviev was born on August 22, 1986, in the Bikin military camp in Khabarovsk Krai, in the Russian Far East. His father left the family when Leviev was two. When he was eight years old, his mother died, and Leviev and his sister were adopted by their mother's distant relatives, who took them to Surgut, the largest city of the Khanty-Mansi Autonomous Okrug in Western Siberia.

After completing high school, Leviev studied law at the Surgut State University, specializing in criminal law. During his studies, he did an internship at an investigation unit of the local police, assisting detectives in criminal investigations. From an early age, he was also interested in computer programming, and in 2009, having become disillusioned with the realities of the Russian legal system, he quit the university and moved to Moscow, where he began working as a computer programmer.

=== Political activity ===
In 2011, after reading opposition blogs, Leviev became interested in Russian politics and began participating in opposition demonstrations. On December 5, 2011, he answered the call of an opposition blogger and activist Alexei Navalny and took part in an opposition rally on Chistoprudny Boulevard. At the rally he was detained by the police and after two days of detention was fined by the court for allegedly shouting “Burn everyone”. After that, he began attending all opposition protests, including rallies on Sakharov Avenue and Bolotnaya Square.

In January 2012, he answered a call by Navalny, who was looking for computer programmers to complete work on a website designed for monitoring presidential election. Leviev “quickly completed the website” and began working for Navalny on a permanent basis; for the first six months he worked directly in the office of the Anti-Corruption Foundation.

In 2012, during the “Occupy Abay” campaign, he worked at the headquarters of Maxim Katz, arranging lawyers, monitoring detention centres and conditions of detainees, as well as presence of minors among the detainees. During the 2013 Moscow mayoral election, Leviev prepared analytical reports for Navalny's headquarters and made live broadcasts, including all of Navalny's official press releases on election day, which, among other things, were shown on TV Rain. Later, he founded a company Newcaster TV, which specialised in online broadcasts of various political actions, in particular, Euromaidan protests in Ukraine and trials of Pussy Riot and protesters on Bolotnaya Square, as well as filming various presentations and business conferences.

During Euromaidan, Leviev monitored air traffic at Kyiv airports and was the first to notice that the day after Sniper shooting of protesters on February 20, 2014, there was a spike in the number of business jets taking off from Boryspil Airport.

=== Military analyst ===
After Russian annexation of Crimea and the start of the war in Donbass, Leviev started Open Source Investigation of the involvement of the Russian military in these events. To be able to investigate a greater number of events and avoid duplication of effort, he joined forces with several other like-minded investigators to form the War in Ukraine (WiU) group. In September 2015, after the start of Russian military intervention in Syria, WiU changed its name to Conflict Intelligence Team (CIT). CIT's investigations have covered other armed conflicts involving Russian armed forces and militias, including their involvement in Libya and Central African Republic. As most other CIT members prefer to remain anonymous, Leviev has been the main public voice of the group.

In early 2022, on behalf of the CIT, Leviev reported extensively on Russian military preparations for the large-scale invasion of Ukraine. In March 2022, after the start of the invasion, Leviev fled Russia and settled in Tbilisi, Georgia, from where he has made daily YouTube broadcasts on the course of the war in conversations with Michael Nacke, an independent journalist who had also left Russia. Leviev also gives frequent interviews to Russian opposition channels and international media.

=== Harassment and prosecution ===
In November 2019, Leviev was attacked near his home by an assailant who hit him and splashed his face with green dye.

On March 16, 2022, Leviev was arrested in absentia for “knowingly spreading false information” about use of Russian armed forces. The prosecution was condemned by the Committee to Protect Journalists.

On November 18, 2022, it became known that the Ministry of Justice of Russia had added Leviev to the Register of Foreign Agents.
