= Sky Shadow (radar jammer) =

RAF EW system

The ARI.23246/1 Sky Shadow is a radar jamming system (ECM pod), initially developed by GEC-Marconi Defence Systems, formerly operated by the Royal Air Force (RAF).

== History ==
It was developed by GEC-Marconi Defence Systems, which employed around 48,000 people, in the early 1970s. Marconi Defence Systems started development in 1972, with production starting in 1979. Production finished in 1996.

The system is designed to jam radar-guided air-to-air missile, ground-to-air missiles and radar directed anti-aircraft-artillerys.

== Operation ==
The Sky Shadow radar jammer was designed for and carried by the RAF's Tornado GR1 and GR4 (now retired). The ECM pod weighed around 200 kg, and was around 3 metres long. It operated in the G to J bands.

The Sky Shadow was hastily fitted to Harrier GR3 aircraft in the Falklands War, on the aircraft's 30mm gun pod. The RAF purchased around 225 ECM pods for the Tornado GR1 (IDS Tornado) fleet.

== See also ==
- Electronic warfare
- Radar jamming and deception
