= Conflict Intelligence Team =

Russian investigative organisation

- Abbreviation: CIT; CITeam
- Formation: 2014
- Founder: Ruslan Leviev
- Type: NGO
- Purpose: Activities of the Russian Armed Forces
- Headquarters: Moscow, Russia (2014–2022); Tbilisi, Georgia (2022–present)
- Methods: Open-source intelligence; human intelligence
- Fields: War journalism
- Members: 5 (2022)
- Official languages: Russian; English
- Website: notes.citeam.org
- Formerly called: War in Ukraine (WiU)

The Conflict Intelligence Team (CIT) is an independent investigative organization, founded by Russian opposition activist Ruslan Leviev, that specializes in open-source intelligence and human intelligence. It is known for its investigations into the activities of Russian Armed Forces in conflicts such as those in Ukraine, Syria, Libya, and the Central African Republic. Founded in 2014, CIT has collaborated with major media outlets and faced significant threats due to its work. The group relocated to Georgia in 2022 to continue its operations after facing legal and physical threats in Russia.

== History ==
The group was founded by Ruslan Leviev, a programmer from Surgut (Russia). According to him, in 2011 he noticed massive fraud in the elections to the State Duma, after which he joined activities of the Russian opposition and started the company to broadcast various events in relation to the Russo-Ukrainian War, particularly the Euromaidan protests in Ukraine. After the annexation of Crimea by Russia and the start of the war in Donbas, Leviev began to cover and investigate the events in these conflicts, including participation of the Russian military in them. At first, his group was called War in Ukraine (WiU), and in September 2015, after the start of the Russian military intervention in the Syrian civil war, it changed its name to the current one. CIT, with six participants, is smaller than other similar organizations and unique because all members are Russian citizens. The names of most members of the group are kept secret for security reasons.

Until 2022, the group operated mainly in Russia and faced threats that included two attempts to initiate a criminal case against Leviev, a summons to the military prosecutor's office, an attack by an unknown person, phone calls with death threats, and a hacker attack by the CyberBerkut group.

On March 5, 2022, CIT announced that it had left Russia in order to be able to continue working. In May, Leviev was charged in exile for violating the March 2022 fake news law, which was criticized by the Committee to Protect Journalists.

In August 2023 the Russian government declared the group an “undesirable organization”, criminalising its work to document and investigate armed conflicts involving Russian forces.

== Activity ==
The group collaborates with major global media that publish its investigations, including the BBC, Reuters, Sky News, and Der Spiegel.

CIT has carried out a number of investigations into the presence and activities of Russian troops in Syria (including the deaths of Russian soldiers and the use of cluster munitions in Syria). By analyzing photographs and maps, CIT disproved the official Russian position that Russian troops in Syria did not participate in ground battles.

Together with Bellingcat, the group studied the circumstances of the Boeing 777 shoot-down in the Donetsk region in 2014. CIT, together with Bellingcat, The Insider, and Proekt, provided the real names of the suspects in the poisoning of Sergei and Yulia Skripal in 2018. In 2020, CIT investigated the murder of Alexander Taraikovsky, a participant in the 2020–2021 Belarusian protests. The group reported in detail about Russia's preparations for the 2022 Russian invasion of Ukraine.
