= Ukkurey (air base) =

Ukurey
- IATA: none; ICAO: XIAU

Summary
- Airport type: Military
- Operator: Russian Air Force
- Location: Chernysevsk
- Elevation AMSL: 1,900 ft / 579 m
- Coordinates: 52°20′0″N 116°50′0″E

Map
- Location in Far Eastern Federal District Ukurey (Russia)

Runways
Direction	Length		Surface
Direction	ft	m	Surface
	9,842	3,000	Concrete

Ukurey (also Komsomolsk and Areda) is an air base in Chitinskaja Oblast, Russia located 24 km southwest of Chernyshevsk. It is a medium-size base with 2 parallel taxiways, tarmacs, and 12 revetments. From 1967-93, it hosted a Military Transport Aviation regiment, from 1989 with Ilyushin Il-76 aircraft.

It was home to 193 Gv ORAP (193rd Guards Independent Reconnaissance Aviation Regiment) flying MiG-25RB, Yak-27, and Yak-28R aircraft in the 1980s. The regiment was disbanded in 1989.
