= Vitebsk (air base) =

Vitebsk-North
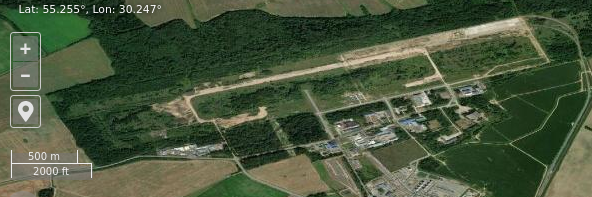
- Satellite imagery of the former Vitebsk air base
- IATA: none; ICAO: XMNW

Summary
- Airport type: Military
- Location: Vitebsk
- Elevation AMSL: 636 ft / 194 m
- Coordinates: 55°15′18″N 30°14′48″E

Map
- Location of airport in Belarus Vitebsk-North (Europe)

Runways
Direction	Length		Surface
Direction	ft	m	Surface
06/24 (closed)	8,200	2,500	Concrete

Vitebsk (also Vitebsk Northeast or Andronovichi) is a former air base in northern Belarus located 8 km northeast of the city of Vitebsk. It was a small airfield complex with a large single tarmac. In Soviet times it was home to the 339th Military Air Transport Regiment (339 VTAP) flying 32 Ilyushin Il-76 cargo jets as well as Antonov An-22 planes.

The regiment was disbanded in 1996.
