= Sozvezdie =

Russian military radio builder

- Type: JSC
- Industry: Defence, electronic warfare
- Founded: February 18, 1958. 2004 (new structure)
- Headquarters: Voronezh, Russia
- Area served: Military
- Products: Electronic warfare systems, Electronic countermeasure, Military radio stations, Automated Unified Tactical Control Systems (AUTCS)
- Revenue: $265 million (2016; 2013)
- Operating income: $27.8 million (2016)
- Net income: $44.4 million (2016)
- Total assets: $66 million (2016)
- Total equity: $281 million (2016)
- Parent: UIMC (Rostec)

Sozvezdie (Russian: Созвездие, Constellation), a joint-stock company also referred to as JSC Concern Sozvezdie, is the leading Russian developer and manufacturer of electronic warfare, radio communications, and electronic countermeasures systems and equipment. Its headquarters are in Voronezh.

== History ==
The Voronezh Scientific Research Institute of Communication (VNIIS) was founded in Voronezh in 1958, and Sozvezdie is headquartered in this city.

In 1963 Sozvezdie was the first in the world to create a fully-fledged mobile communications system.

The organization was founded on July 29, 2004 by decree of the Russian president. It has developed Russia's new multi-functional electronic warfare weapon system.

On July 16, 2014, the Obama administration imposed sanctions through the US Department of Treasury's Office of Foreign Assets Control (OFAC) by adding Concern Sozvezdie and other entities to the Specially Designated Nationals List (SDN) in retaliation for the ongoing Russo-Ukrainian War.

== Structure ==
Apart from VNIIS, Sozvezdie includes the following enterprises and scientific research institutes:

- JSC TNIIR 'Efir'
- JSC Sarapul radiozavod
- JSC Tambov plant 'Revtrud'
- JSC Elektroautomatika
- JSC NPP 'Start'
- JSC Tambov plant 'October'
- JSC 'Luch' Plant
- JSC Ryazanskiy radiozavod
- JSC Slavgorod plant of radioequipment
- JSC Almaz
- JSC Voronezh Central KB 'Polyus'
- JSC VNII 'Vega'
- JSC NPP 'Volna'
- JSC 'Yantar' plant
- JSC Krasnodar instrumentation plant 'Kaskade'
- JSC Krasnodar KB 'Selena'
- JSC 'KB of experimental works'

== Directors ==
From October 2022 Vilkov Sergey Valerievich – executive director of JSC Concern Sozvezdie

== Personnel structure ==
As of May 1, 2015 the company employed 5,418 people.

30 people are laureates of state prizes. The concern employs 1 corresponding member of the Russian Academy of Sciences, 1 corresponding member of the Russian Academy of Sciences, 1 Honored Scientist of the Russian Federation, 21 professors, 17 doctors of Sciences, 177 candidates of Sciences, 39 graduate students. Educational projects are successfully carried out, within the framework of which the work of 7 branches of departments and 1 basic department of leading universities in the region for the training of specialists — VSU, VSTU, VSUET and MICT is organized.

A special place in the social policy of the concern is occupied by the current correspondence graduate school in 3 technical and 1 economic specialties.

Sozvezdie runs career guidance programs for engineering specialties, assists new employees with workplace adaptation, and modifies its employee motivation system. The enterprise currently implements initiatives such as the "Young Specialists" and "Reserve" programs.

== Awards ==
Employees of Concern Sozvezdie JSC have been awarded a high award by the Government of the Russian Federation for developments in the field of electronic warfare. The award of the Government of the Russian Federation was awarded to the director of the STC "Electronic Warfare and Special Communications" M. L. Artemov, Deputy Director of the STC Yu. N. Rybalkina, head of the 403 VP MO S. G. Borisov, head of the NTU Yu. N. Kulikov and Deputy head of the NTU O. V. Afanasyev, as well as Acting Director General of JSC TNIR "Ether" V. I. Iradionov.

Every year, the concern's employees take prizes in professional skill competitions. In 2016, representatives of "Sozvezdie" were again among the winners of the regional competition "Golden Hands" in the nominations "Turner" and "Milling machine operator".

== See also ==
- Almaz-Antey
