= United Instrument Manufacturing Corporation =

Russian state corporation

United Instrument Manufacturing Corporation (UIMC)
- Company type: State corporation
- Industry: Electronics industry, Defense Industry
- Founded: 2014
- Defunct: 2017
- Successor: Ruselectronics
- Headquarters: Moscow, Russia
- Production output: Electronics, Means and systems of automated digital communication; automated control systems; systems and means of electronic warfare; robotic systems and unmanned aerial vehicles; software; data security, etc.
- Revenue: 1,580,000,000 United States dollar (2016)
- Net income: 101.6 billion rubles (the Total revenue of the Corporation of enterprises)
- Number of employees: 43000
- Parent: Rostec

United Instrument Manufacturing Corporation (Russian: Объединённая приборостроительная корпорация) or UIMC was a Russian state-owned company, which was founded in March 2014 within state corporation Rostec as a specialized management company uniting research and production enterprises of radioelectronic industry of Russia. Rostec owned 9.3% of the shares as of April 2015. The company merged with Ruselectronics in February 2017.

They manufactured Sozvezdie's electronic warfare weapon system Borisoglebsk 2. Several products are for civilian or dual-purpose use. The corporation comprised 40 companies from scratch, and this number increased to above 60. These 60 companies had a total of 43,000 employees in 2017.

The UIMC board included seven members, with Grigory Elkin as interim CEO in July 2017.

== History ==
The basis for the creation of JSC United Instrument Corporation was the approval of the State Program of the Russian Federation "Development of the Electronic and Radioelectronic industry for 2013-2025".

On May 8, 2013, the order of the President of Russia V. V. Putin No. Pr-1056 "On the creation of a united holding company in the field of radioelectronic industry" was issued.

On April 29, 2014, the Rostec Supervisory Board approved the proposal of the corporation's management board to form the United Instrument Corporation holding, which included the Constellation and Vega concerns, the Management Systems Company and the Central Research Institute of Economics, Informatics and Management Systems.

In 2014, in accordance with the Decree of the President of the Russian Federation "On the Property Contribution of the Russian Federation to the State Corporation Rostechnologii and on Amendments to the List of strategic Enterprises" dated January 14, 2014 No.20, the State Corporation Rostechnologii (Rostec) received as a property contribution of the Russian Federation 100 percent of shares in a number of open joint-stock companies, including Vega Radio Engineering Corporation (Moscow), Sozvezdie Concern (Voronezh) and Management Systems (Moscow), which are federally owned. By the same Decree, the enterprises transferred to Rostec were excluded from the List of Strategic Enterprises and strategic joint-stock companies. The relevant changes were approved by the Decree of the Government of the Russian Federation dated April 21, 2014 No.365. With the approval of the Rostec Supervisory Board, these enterprises became part of JSC United Instrument Corporation. Alexander Sergeevich Yakunin was appointed the first General Director of JSC "OPK".

In 2014, UIMC delivered NKVS-27, which is a ground-based aerial communication system to the Vietnam armed forces.

In February 2017 Rostec State Corporation announced the merger of JSC Russian Electronics and JSC United Instrument Corporation. As a result of the consolidation of assets, a radioelectronic company was formed – Russia's largest manufacturer of communications equipment, automated control systems, as well as other types of high-tech military and civilian products.

In 2021 the process of combining Rostec's radioelectronic assets under a single management and the creation of a national electronics vendor under the Roselektronika brand was completed. The new holding includes the Automatika Concern and the National Center for Informatization, an integrator of Rostec's integrated IT solutions. JSC United Instrument Engineering Corporation became the management company.

Sanctioned by New Zealand in relation to the 2022 Russian invasion of Ukraine.

== Products ==
UIMC subsidiary Sozvezdie launched software-defined radios (SDR) at the end of 2021. TASS 82403177 is a SDR jam-proof radio.

== The Board of Directors ==
General manager of JSC "OPK" — Sergey Stepanovich Sakhnenko. The Board of Directors of JSC "OPK" includes:

- Nazarov Alexander Yuryevich — Deputy General Director of Rostec State Corporation
- Lobanova Oksana Gennadievna — Director of Economics and Finance at Rostec State Corporation
- Pavel Mikhailovich Osin — Director of Legal Support at Rostec State Corporation
- Koptev Yuri Nikolaevich — Chairman of the Scientific and Technical Council of the Rostec State Corporation
- Popov Alexander Nikolaevich — Director for Special Assignments of the Rostec State Corporation
- Ladygin Sergey Fedorovich — Deputy General Director of Rosoboronexport JSC
