= Airborne Early Warning Group (JASDF) =

Airborne Early Warning Surveillance Group
- 警戒航空隊
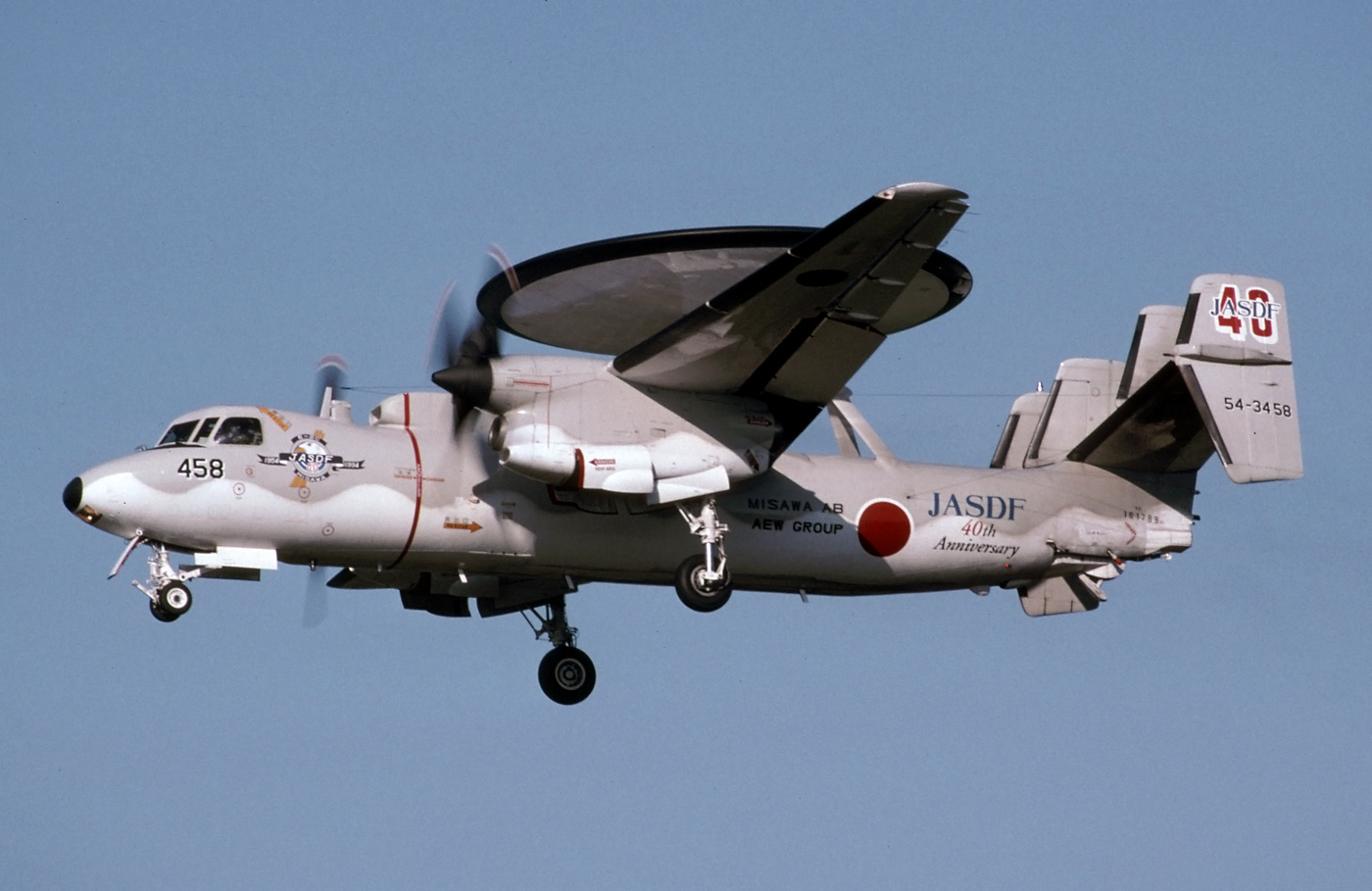
- 601st Sqn E-2C in flight (1994)
- Country: Japan
- Branch: Japan Air Self-Defense Force
- Garrison/HQ: Hamamatsu Air Base

The Airborne Early Warning Surveillance Group (警戒航空隊, keikaikoukuutai) is a unit of the Japan Air Self-Defense Force (JASDF) based at Hamamatsu Air Base in Shizuoka Prefecture, Japan. It oversees the JASDF's Airborne Early Warning squadrons.

== Units ==
- Airborne Early Warning Surveillance Group (Misawa Air Base)
  - 601st Squadron (JASDF) (Misawa Air Base) (Grumman E-2C)
  - 603rd Squadron (JASDF) (Naha Air Base) (Grumman E-2C)
  - 602nd Squadron (JASDF) (Hamamatsu Air Base) (Boeing E-767)
