= 32nd Training Squadron (JASDF) =

Japanese air force unit

- 第32飛行隊
- Country: Japan
- Branch: Japan Air Self-Defense Force
- Part of: 1st Air Wing, Air Training Command
- Garrison/HQ: Hamamatsu Air Base

Aircraft flown
- Trainer: Kawasaki T-4

The 32nd Training Squadron (第32飛行隊 (dai-32-hikoutai)) is a unit of the Japan Air Self-Defense Force. It comes under the authority of the 1st Air Wing of Air Training Command. It is based at Hamamatsu Air Base in Shizuoka Prefecture. It is equipped with Kawasaki T-4 aircraft.

== Aircraft operated ==
- Kawasaki T-4 (1990–present)
