= No. 50 Squadron IAF =

IAF Squadron

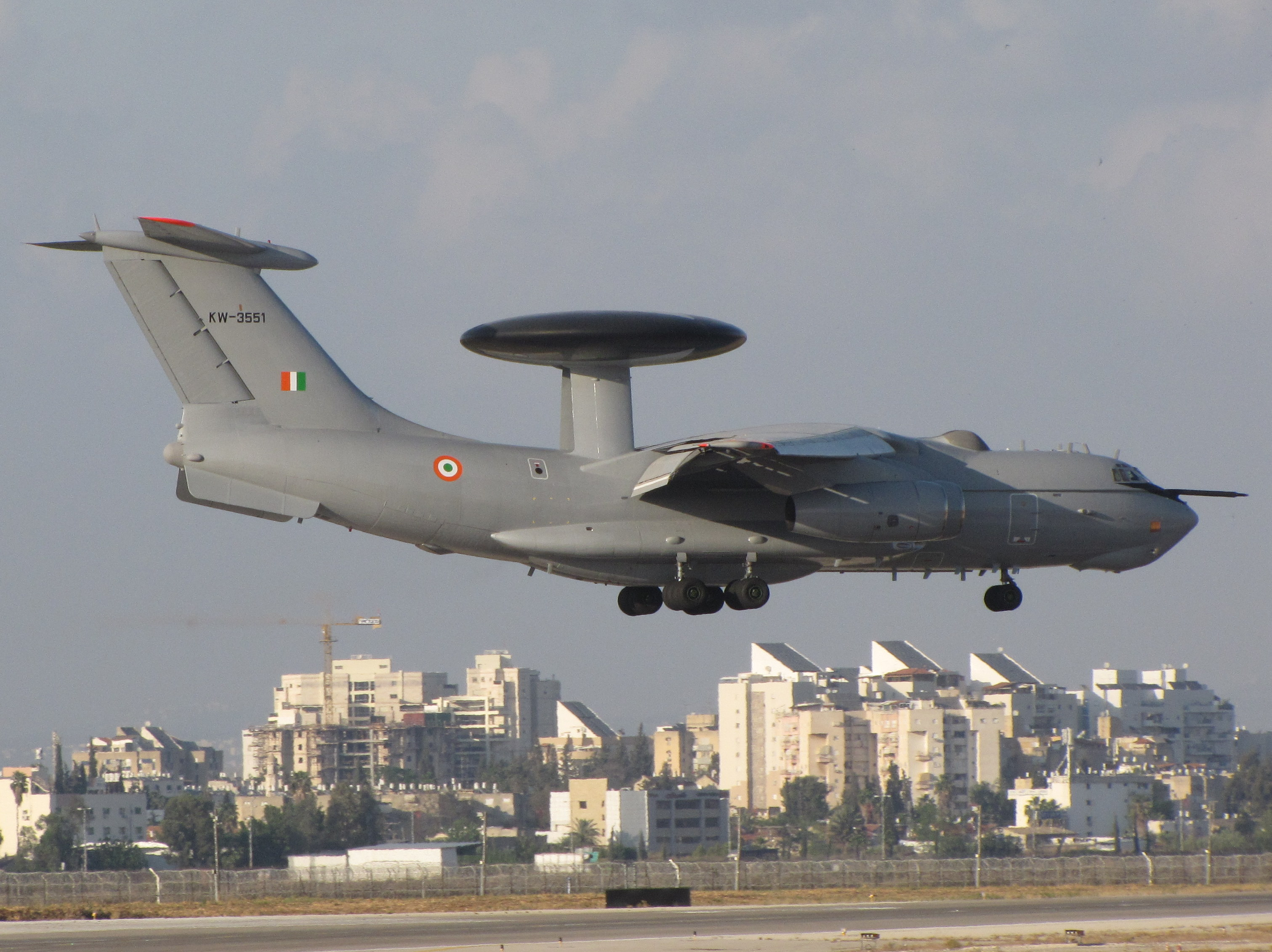
- Beriev A-50 with Phalcon; Airborne Warning, Command and Control System
- Active: 28 May 2009 - Present
- Country: India
- Role: Airborne early warning and control
- Garrison/HQ: AFS Agra
- Nickname: Adwitiya (Peerless)
- Motto: "Sangrame Jayate Shur"

Aircraft flown
- Transport: Beriev A-50

No. 50 squadron IAF is an Indian Air Force transport squadron that participates in operations involving Aerial reconnaissance and Early Warning Missile Launches.

== History ==
The No. 50 Squadron were raised in 2009 at Agra Airforce Station of the Central Air Command. Beriev A-50 is based on the air-frame of the Ilyushin Il-76 and fitted by Beriev with PS-90A-76 engines and Israeli radar system EL/W-2090(Phalcon) mounted on the aircraft by Israeli company Elta Electronics Industries.

=== Lineage ===
- Constituted as No. 50 Squadron on 28 May 2009

=== Assignments ===
- Red Flag exercise

=== Aircraft ===
- Beriev A-50
