= EL/W-2090 =

Airborne early warning and control radar system

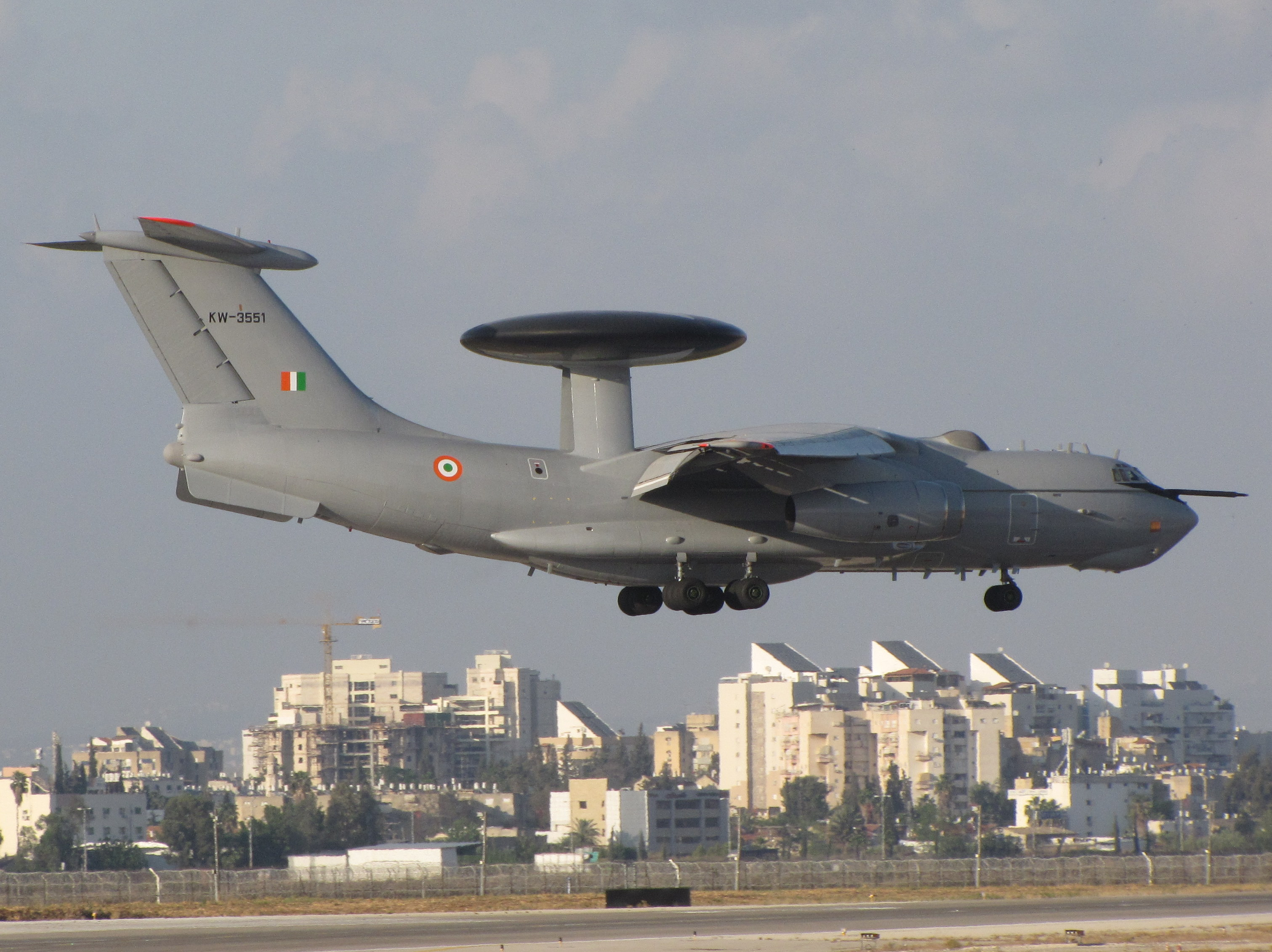
A-50EI (Il-76) of the Indian Air Force with the EL/W-2090

The IAI EL/W-2090 is an airborne early warning and control (AEW&C) radar system developed by Israel Aerospace Industries (IAI) and Elta Electronics Industries of Israel. Its primary objective is to provide intelligence to maintain air superiority and conduct surveillance. The system is currently in-service with the Indian Air Force.

It is a development of the EL/M-2075 system, described by the Federation of American Scientists as the most advanced AEW&C system in the world in a 1999 article.

== Design and features ==
The EL/W-2090 is a further development of EL/M-2075 and EL/W-2085.

The EL/W-2090 uses an active electronically scanned array (AESA), an active phased array radar. This radar consists of an array of transmit/receive (T/R) modules that allow a beam to be electronically steered, making a physically rotating radome unnecessary. AESA radars operate on a pseudorandom set of frequencies and also have very short scanning rates, which makes them difficult to detect and jam.

== Orders ==
=== India ===
On 2 March 2004, a deal worth US$1.1 billion was signed between Israel and India as per which IAI would deliver the Indian Air Force three Phalcon AEW&C radar systems. The systems were estimated to cost approximately $350 million each and would be delivered within 44 months. The deal followed a preliminary agreement in October 2003. India signed a deal with Ilyushin of Russia for the supply of three Il-76TD heavy airlifters, which were to be used as platforms for these radar systems, for US$500 million each.

The first aircraft was delivered to India on 25 May 2009, landing at Jamnagar AFS in Gujarat, completing its 8 hour long journey from Israel. After entering the Indian airspace the aircraft was escorted by 3 MiG-29 and Jaguars each. This marked the first AWACS of the Indian Air Force. It was inducted into No. 50 Squadron on 28 May. The aircraft had been delivered to Israel for radar integration on 20 January 2008. The second aircraft was delivered in 2010. The third aircraft (KW-3553) was delivered to Israel for radar integration on 8 October 2010. All the aircraft were delivered by 2011.

India had plans to procure 2 additional AWACS of the same type. But the price was a hindrance. As per report in October 2017 the Indian government was ready for $800 million but OEMs wanted $1.3 billion for the deal. This was a result of the sudden increase in price of Il-76. On 11 September 2018, the deal, worth around $800 million, was ready to be cleared by the Cabinet Committee on Security (CCS) after multiple delays. By then, the Phalcon system was an integral part of IACCS. In August 2020, India was reportedly ready to approve the deal for around $1 billion, with scheduled delivery within the next 3 or 4 years with upgrades. The acquisition plan was derailed earlier multiple times. However the acquisition plan did not move ahead as of 2022 and IAF revealed plans to operate some AEW&Cs on lease from international market as intermediate measure until indigenous Netra Mk 2 is procured.

=== China ===
In 1994, Israel entered into talks with China regarding the sale of the Phalcon radar system, initially for four units but with an understanding that as many as eight would be procured. An agreement between China and Israel was signed in July 1996. Russia entered the program in March 1997; the first Il-76 slated for modifications landed in Israel in October 1999. Although the US government was aware of the sale, it remained silent until October 1999, when it publicly opposed the sale of the EL/W-2090 to China. Fearing that the system would alter the military balance in the Taiwan Strait, American officials threatened to withhold aid to Israel in April 2000 if the deal proceeded.

On 12 July 2000, Prime Minister Ehud Barak announced that Israel would scrap the deal. However, it was not until July 2000 when a formal letter was sent to the Chinese government; the Israeli government hoped that the newly elected Bush administration would endorse the Phalcon deal. In March 2002, Israel concluded a $350-million compensation package to China, more than the $160-million advance payment China had already made. Subsequently, the Chinese-origin KJ-2000 AEW&C entered service in 2004 and the order for EL/W-2090 did not proceed.

== Operators ==
- Israel - In service with the Israeli air force nicknamed "Nachshon-Eitam"
- India
  - Indian Air Force – 3 in service
    - No. 50 Squadron IAF
