= EL/W-2085 =

Airborne early warning radar system

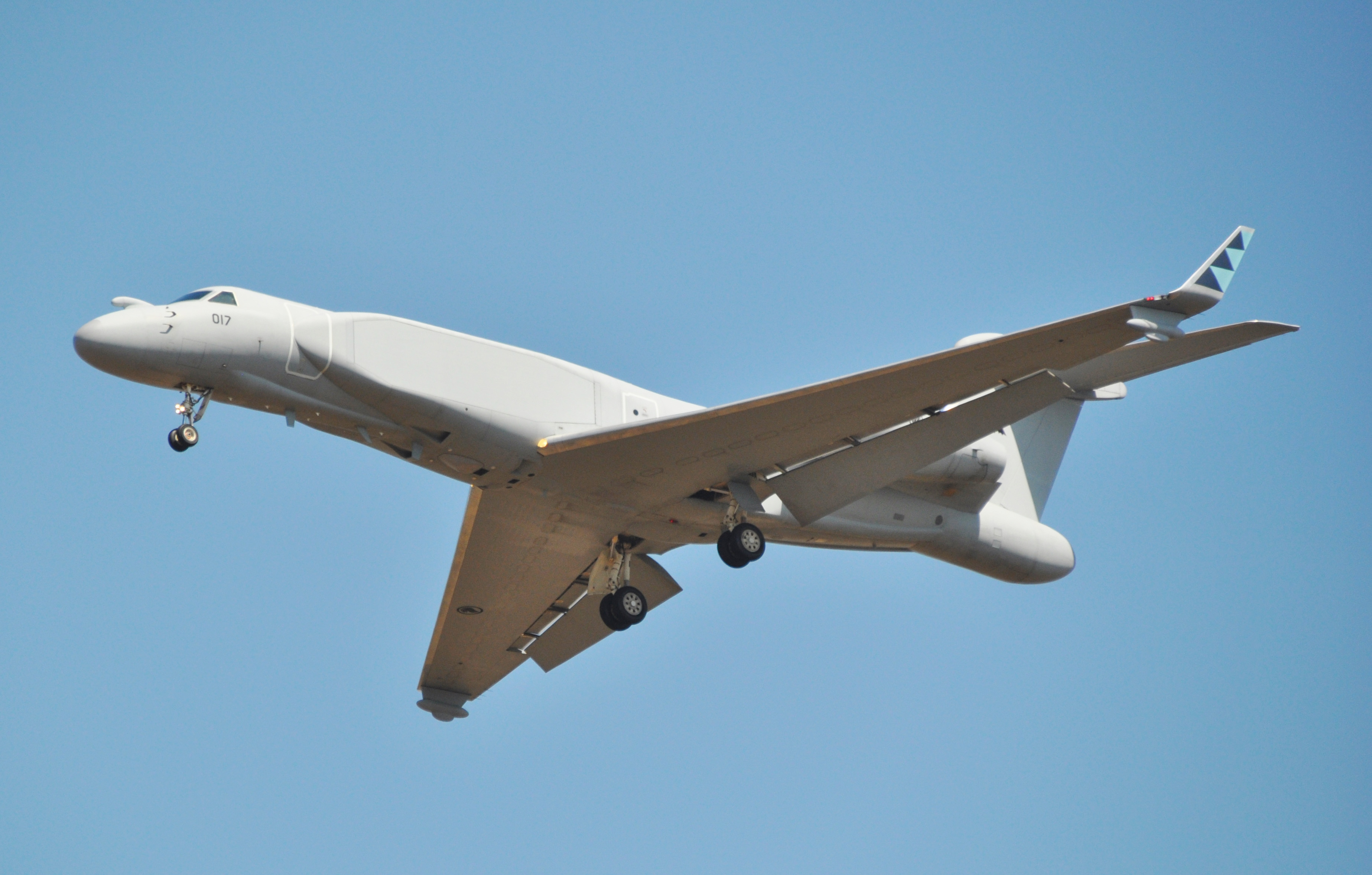
- A Republic of Singapore Air Force Gulfstream G550CAEW
- Country of origin: Israel
- Manufacturer: IAI / Elta
- Type: conformal array radar

The EL/W-2085 is an airborne early warning and control (AEW&C) multi-band radar system developed by Israel Aerospace Industries (IAI) and Elta Electronics Industries of Israel. Its primary objective is to provide intelligence to maintain air superiority and conduct surveillance. The system is currently in-service with Israel, Italy, and Singapore.

== Design and features ==
The EL/W-2085 was developed from the single-band EL/M-2075 "Phalcon" system.

Instead of using a rotodome, a moving radar found on some AEW&C aircraft, the EL/W-2085 uses an active electronically scanned array (AESA) – an active phased array radar. This radar consists of an array of transmit/receive (T/R) modules that allow a beam to be electronically steered, making a physically rotating rotodome unnecessary. AESA radars operate on a pseudorandom set of frequencies and also have very short scanning rates, which makes them difficult to detect and jam. Up to 1000 targets can be tracked simultaneously to a range of 243 nmi (450 km), while at the same time, multitudes of air-to-air interceptions or air-to-surface (includes maritime) attacks can be guided simultaneously. The radar equipment of the Israeli CAEW consists of each one L-band radar left and right sides on the fuselage and each one S-band antenna in nose and tail. The phased array allows positions of aircraft on operator screens to be updated every 2–4 seconds, rather than every 10 seconds as is the case on the rotodome AWACS.

== Operational history ==
In 2005, the Israeli Air Force purchased five Gulfstream G550-based Eitam aircraft to serve as the new IDF platform for its newer generation of AEW systems. The new aircraft use the EL/W-2085 dual-band sensor suite, and are more capable and less expensive to operate than the older Boeing 707-based EL/M-2075. Extensive modifications were made to the Gulfstream's fuselage by IAI, such as the addition of protruding composite radomes, to house the radar arrays in conformal body modifications. Based at Nevatim Airbase.

In 2007, four similar G550-EL/W-2085 aircraft were purchased by the Republic of Singapore Air Force to replace its upgraded E-2C Hawkeyes. The new G550 aircraft entered service on 13 April 2012.

Italy initially purchased two G550-EL/W-2085 aircraft in 2011 and ordered two more in 2022.

In 2018, the U.S. Navy accepted delivery of a G550-EL/W-2085 intended to be further modified by Raytheon to become the NC-37B.

== Operators ==
=== Current operators ===
Israel (2 + 1 on order)
Israeli Air Force
Italy (2 + 2 on order)
Operated by the Italian Air Force (with the CAEW aircraft, know locally as the E-550A).
- 2 ordered in 2012, delivered in 2018.
- 2 ordered in 2024.
Singapore (4)
Singapore Air Force

=== Future operators ===
South Korea (4 on order)
Saab and KAI (Korea Aerospace Industries) signed a memorandum of understanding in October 2024 for industrial cooperation and transfer of technology regarding the AEW&C II programme for the South Korean Air Force.
In September 2025, South Korea selected the Phoenix by L3Harris fitted with the EL/W-2085 radar by Elta.

== See also ==
- EL/W-2090 – Airborne early warning and control radar system
- Erieye – Airborne Early Warning and Control System used on a variety of aircraft platforms
- L3Harris EA-37B Compass Call – American electronic warfare airplane
