= 602nd Squadron (JASDF) =

- 第602飛行隊
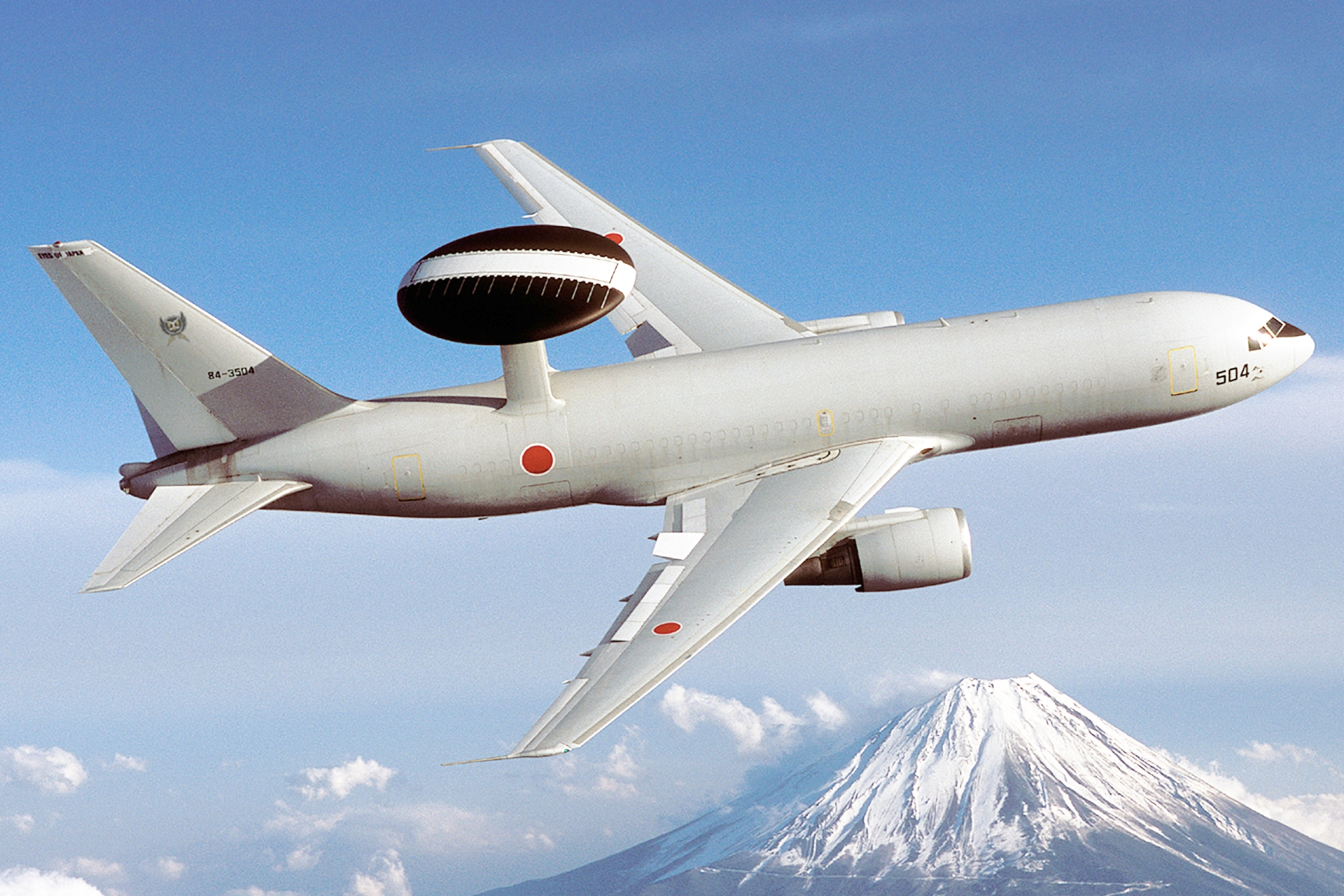
- 602nd Sqn E-767 in flight near Mount Fuji
- Country: Japan
- Allegiance: AEW Surveillance Group (JASDF)
- Branch: Japan Air Self-Defense Force
- Garrison/HQ: Hamamatsu Air Base

Aircraft flown
- Electronic warfare: Boeing E-767

The 602nd Squadron (第602飛行隊, dai-roku-zero-ni-hikoutai) is a squadron of the Airborne Early Warning Surveillance Group of the Japan Air Self-Defense Force (JASDF) based at Hamamatsu Air Base in Shizuoka Prefecture, Japan. It is equipped with Boeing E-767 aircraft.

== History ==
The squadron participated in the Cope North exercise for the first time in 2001. It has also participated in other years including 2003.

The squadron's aircraft have also taken part in the Red Flag - Alaska exercise, including in 2008, 2009, 2012 2014 and 2015.

In 2014 the JASDF ordered upgrades for the aircraft and its systems.

== Aircraft operated ==
- Boeing E-767
