= 603rd Squadron (JASDF) =

- 第603飛行隊
- Active: April 20, 2014
- Country: Japan
- Allegiance: AEW Surveillance Group (JASDF)
- Branch: Japan Air Self-Defense Force
- Garrison/HQ: Naha Air Base

Aircraft flown
- Electronic warfare: Northrop Grumman E-2C Hawkeye

The 603rd Squadron (第603飛行隊, dai-roku-zero-san-hikoutai) is a squadron of the Airborne Early Warning Surveillance Group of the Japan Air Self-Defense Force (JASDF) based at Naha Air Base in Okinawa Prefecture, Japan. It is equipped with Northrop Grumman E-2C Hawkeye aircraft.

== History ==
In the early 2010s the amount of air activity by China near Okinawa increased dramatically after Japan effectively nationalized the disputed Senkaku Islands, sparking a major backlash from China. Beginning in 2012 E-2C aircraft began deploying to Naha air base, and in 2014 the squadron was officially formed.

The unit was formed by taking around 130 personnel and four of the JASDF's 13 E-2C aircraft from 601st Squadron at Misawa Air Base in Aomori Prefecture.

On April 12, 2015 one of the squadron's aircraft made an emergency landing at Kadena Air Base due to electrical problems.

== Tail markings ==
Unlike many other JASDF squadrons, the squadron's aircraft generally have a marking on their forward fuselage instead of on the tail. The marking is of a bat grasping lightning bolts, retained from the aircraft's time with the 601st Squadron.

== Aircraft operated ==
- Northrop Grumman E-2C Hawkeye (2014–)
