= 1st Air Wing (JASDF) =

- 第1航空団
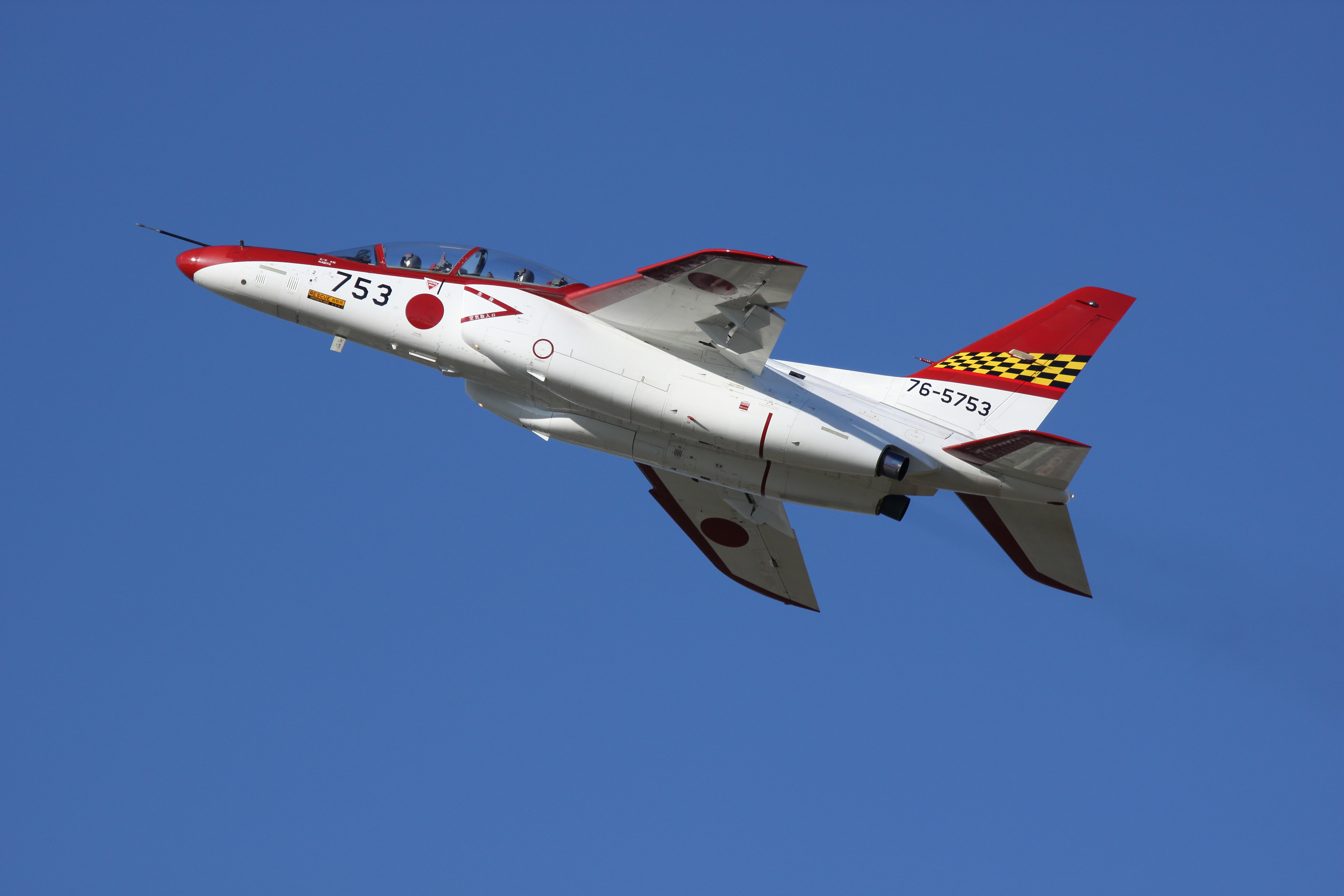
- 1st Air Wing Kawasaki T-4 (2010)
- Active: December 1, 1955
- Country: Japan
- Branch: Japan Air Self-Defense Force
- Part of: Air Training Command
- Garrison/HQ: Hamamatsu Air Base

Aircraft flown
- Trainer: Kawasaki T-4

The 1st Air Wing (第1航空団, dai-ichi-koukudan) is a wing of the Japan Air Self-Defense Force. It comes under the authority of the Air Training Command and resides in Shizuoka Prefecture.

== History ==
=== Formation ===
The 1st Air Wing was formed in 1 December 1955.

== Organisation ==
As of 2017 it has two squadrons, both equipped with Kawasaki T-4 aircraft:

- 31st Training Squadron
- 32nd Training Squadron

It is currently based at Hamamatsu Air Base in Shizuoka Prefecture.
