= 601st Squadron (JASDF) =

- 第601飛行隊
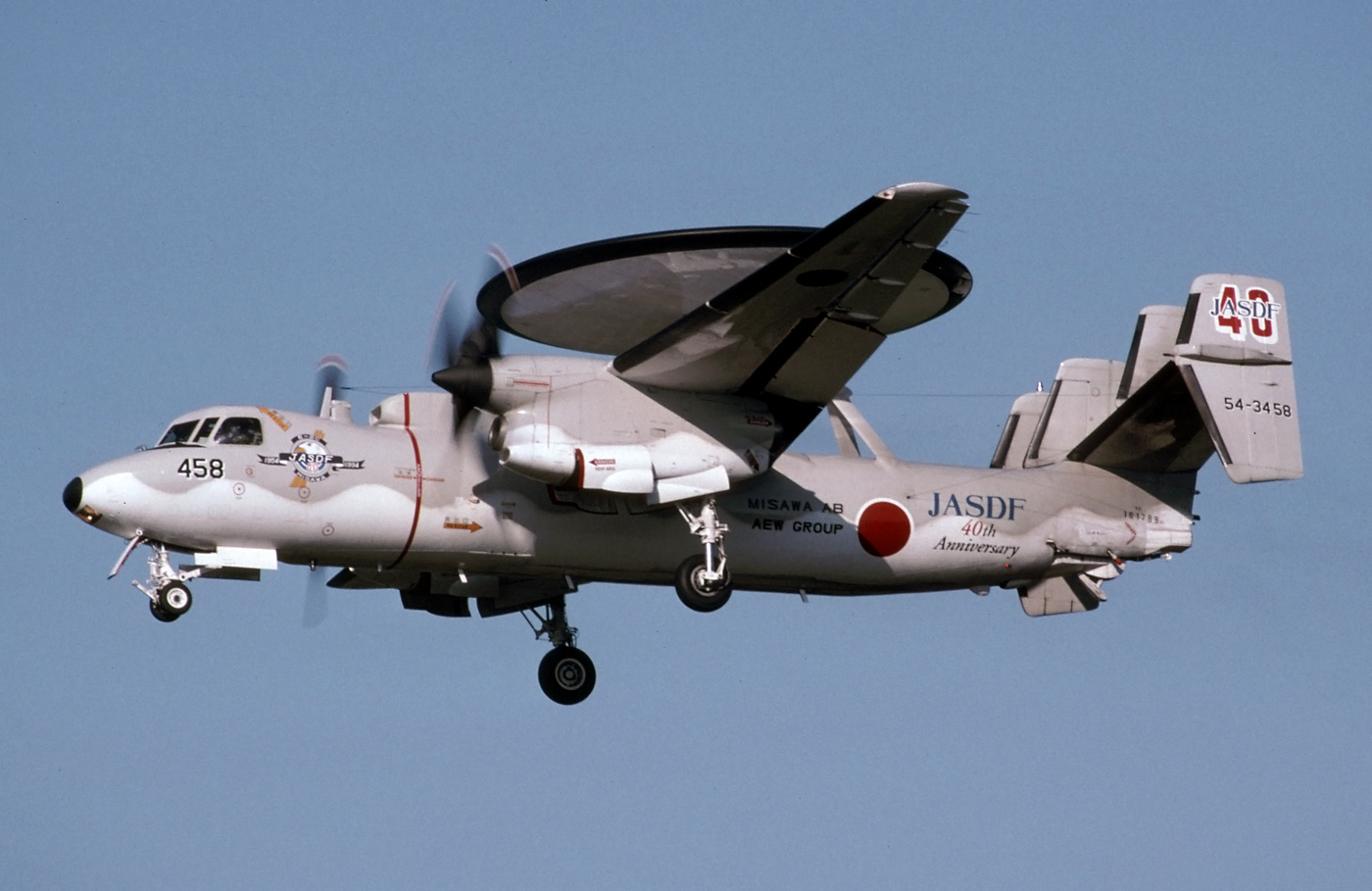
- 601st Sqn E-2C in flight (1994)
- Country: Japan
- Allegiance: AEW Surveillance Group (JASDF)
- Branch: Japan Air Self-Defense Force
- Garrison/HQ: Misawa Air Base

Aircraft flown
- Electronic warfare: Northrop Grumman E-2C/D Hawkeye/Advanced Hawkeye

The 601st Squadron (Japanese: 第601飛行隊, Hepburn: dai601hikoutai) is a squadron of the Airborne Early Warning Surveillance Group of the Japan Air Self-Defense Force (JASDF) based at Misawa Air Base in Aomori Prefecture, Japan. It is equipped with Northrop Grumman E-2C/D Hawkeye aircraft.

== History ==
In the early 2010s the amount of air activity by China near Okinawa increased dramatically after Japan effectively nationalized the disputed Senkaku Islands, sparking a major backlash from China.

Beginning in 2012 E-2C aircraft of the squadron began deploying to Naha Air Base as required, and in 2014 603rd Squadron was officially formed by taking around 130 personnel and four of the squadron's 13 E-2C aircraft from Misawa Air Base in Aomori Prefecture. This left the 601st squadron with nine aircraft.

== Tail markings ==
Unlike many other JASDF squadrons, the squadron's aircraft generally have a marking on their forward fuselage instead of on the tail. The marking is of a bat grasping two bolts of lightning.

== Aircraft operated ==
- Northrop Grumman E-2C/D Hawkeye/Advanced Hawkeye
