= EL/M-2075 Phalcon =

Airborne early warning and control radar system

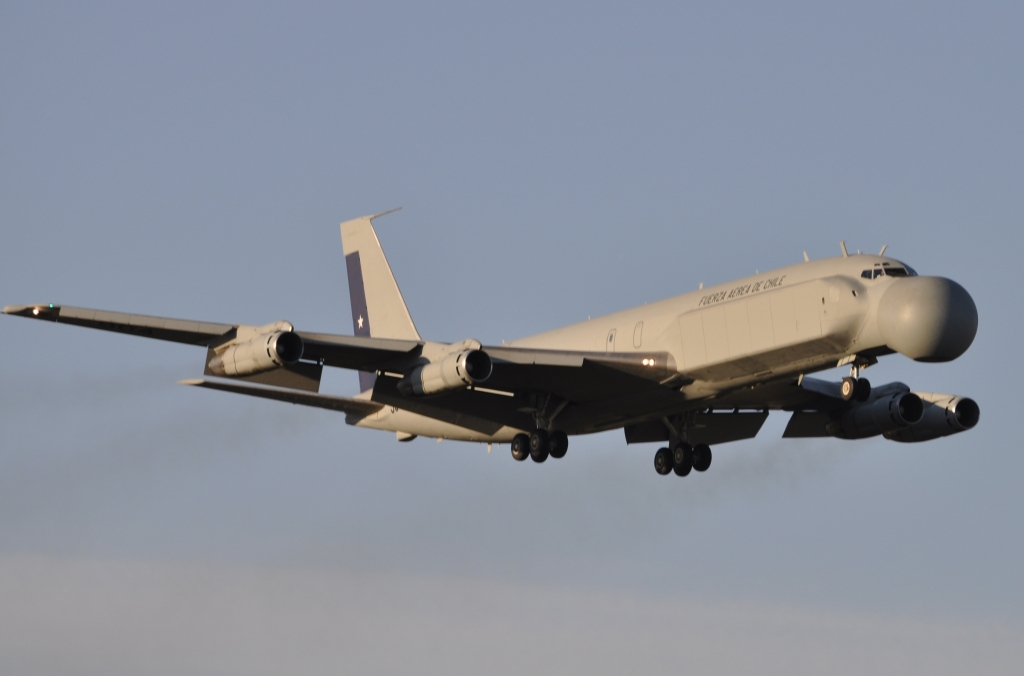
- A Chilean Air Force Phalcon
- Country of origin: Israel
- Introduced: May 1994
- Type: solid-state L-band conformal array radar

The EL/M-2075 Phalcon is an airborne early warning and control (AEW&C) active electronically scanned array radar system developed by Israel Aerospace Industries (IAI) and Elta Electronics Industries of Israel. the first Phalcon system to be installed was fitted to a former LanChile Boeing 707. Its primary objective is to provide intelligence to maintain air superiority and conduct surveillance. It was surpassed by newer versions—the EL/W-2085 and the EL/W-2090.

== History ==
The Phalcon was first revealed at the Paris Air Show in 1993.

=== Operational history ===
The Israeli Air Force installed the Phalcon system on Boeing 707 aircraft, which replaced its E-2Cs which were retired in mid-1990s.

== Design and features ==
The EL/M-2075 is a solid-state L-band conformal array radar system for use on a Boeing 707 and other aircraft.Phalcon, as the complete AEW mission suite is referred to, is intended for airborne early warning, tactical surveillance of airborne and surface targets and intelligence gathering. It also integrates the command and control capabilities needed to employ this information. The system uses six panels of phased-array elements: two on each side of the fuselage, one in an enlarged nosecone and one under the tail. Each array consists of 768 liquid-cooled, solid-state transmitting and receiving elements, each of which is weighted in phase and amplitude. These elements are driven by individual modules and every eight modules are connected to a transmit/receive group. Groups of 16 of these eight module batches are linked back to what is described as a pre-receive/transmit unit, and a central six-way control is used to switch the pre-transmit/receive units of the different arrays on a time division basis.

Instead of using a rotodome, a moving radar found on some AEW&C aircraft, the Phalcon uses the active electronically scanned array (AESA), an active phased array radar. This radar consists of an array of transmit/receive (T/R) modules that allow a beam to be electronically steered, making a physically rotating rotodome unnecessary. AESA radars operate on a pseudorandom set of frequencies and also have very short scanning rates, which makes them difficult to detect and jam. Up to 100 targets can be tracked simultaneously to a range of 200 nmi (370 km), while at the same time, over a dozen air-to-air interception or air-to-ground attack can be guided. The radar can be mounted on an aircraft's fuselage or on the top inside a small dome. Either position gives the radar 360-degree coverage. The phased array radar allows positions of aircraft on operator screens to be updated every 2–4 seconds, rather than every 20–40 seconds as is the case on the rotodome AWACS.

As used in its Chilean Boeing 707-based application, the lateral fairings measured approximately 12 × 2 m and were mounted on floating beds to prevent airframe flexing degrading the radar accuracy. Each array scans a given azimuth sector, providing a total coverage of 360°. Scanning is carried out electronically in both azimuth and elevation. Radar modes include high PRF search and full track, track-while-scan, a slow scan detection mode for hovering and low-speed helicopters (using rotor blade returns) and a low PRF ship detection mode.

=== Platforms ===
The system can be fitted to a number of aircraft, including the Boeing 707, Boeing 767 and Boeing 747 series aircraft. Under a contract signed with Chile in 1989, the first Phalcon system to be installed was fitted to a former LanChile Boeing 707, and was first flown in 1993. In May 1994, the aircraft was delivered to the Chilean Air Force, where it is known as the Condor.

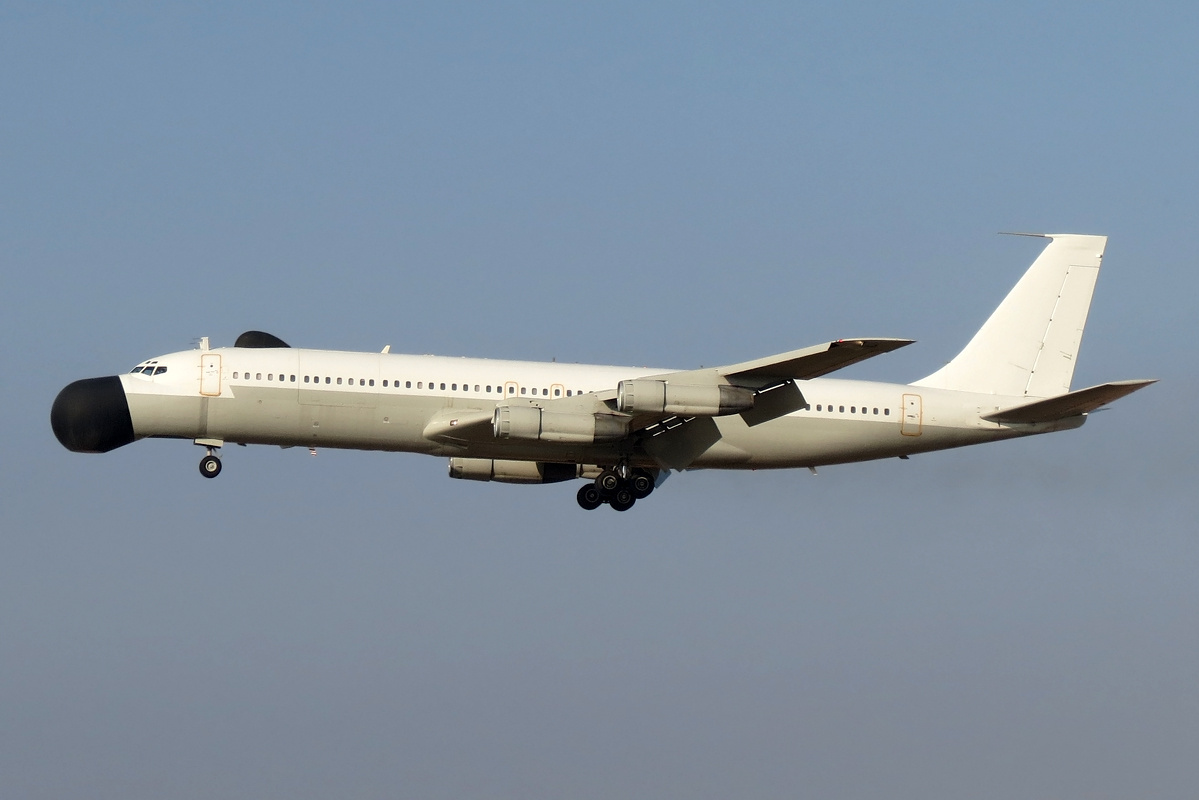
A development system mounted on a Boeing 707

== Operators ==
=== Current operators ===
- Israel: 2 in service with Israeli Air Force: (supplemented with the multi-band EL/W-2085).

=== Former operators ===
- Chile: Had one in service on a Boeing 707 platform in Chilean Air Force, which was replaced with E-3D Sentry aircraft in 2022.

=== Failed contracts ===
- China
- India
