= Hamamatsu Air Base =

Hamamatsu Air Base 浜松基地
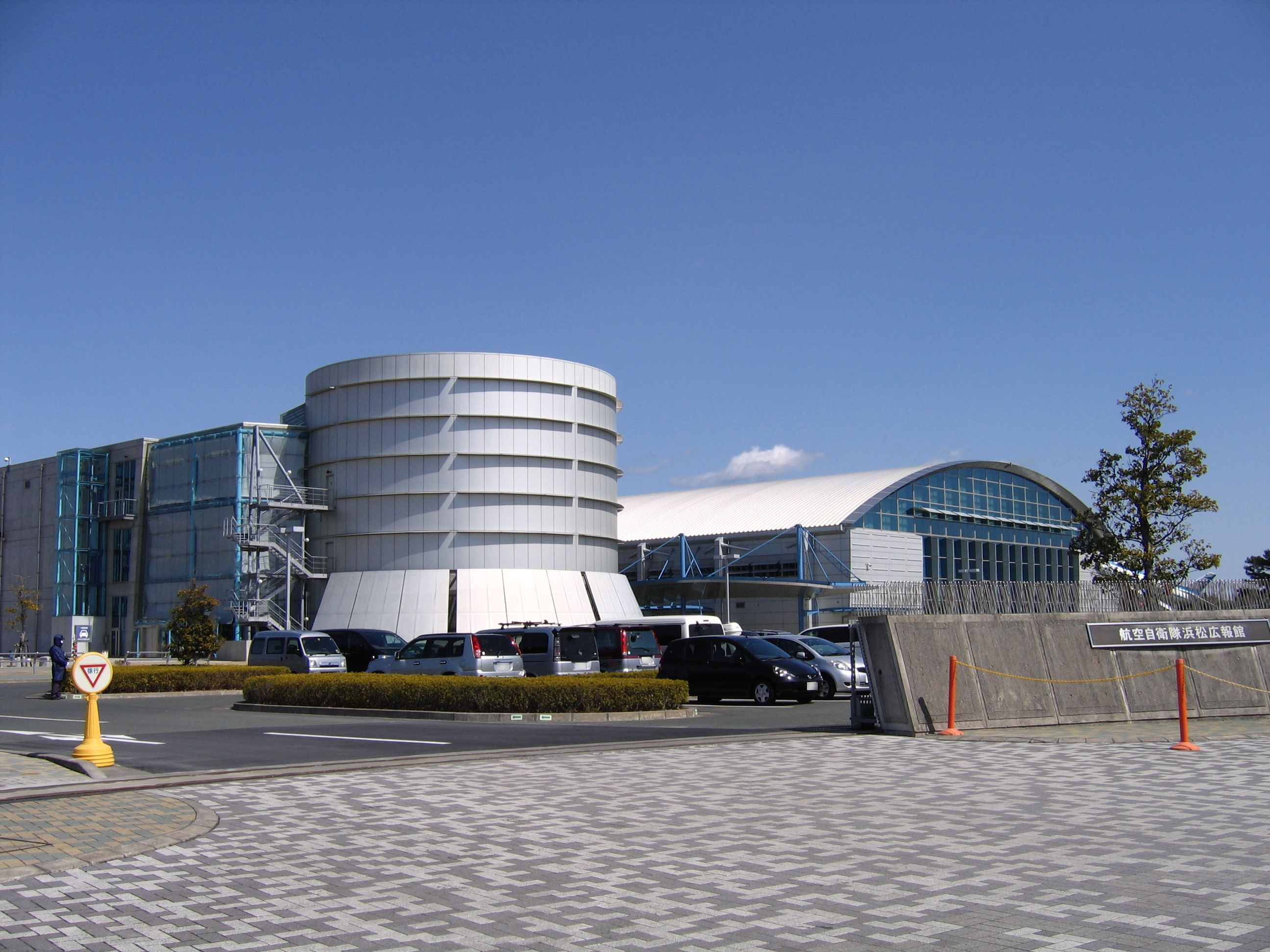
- IATA: none; ICAO: RJNH

Summary
- Airport type: Military
- Owner: Ministry of Defense
- Operator: JASDF
- Location: Hamamatsu, Shizuoka, Japan
- Elevation AMSL: 150 ft / 46 m
- Coordinates: 34°45′01″N 137°42′11″E

Map
- Location in Japan RJNH (Japan)

Runways
Direction	Length		Surface
Direction	m	ft	Surface
09/27	2,550	8,366	Concrete
- Source: Japanese AIP at AIS Japan

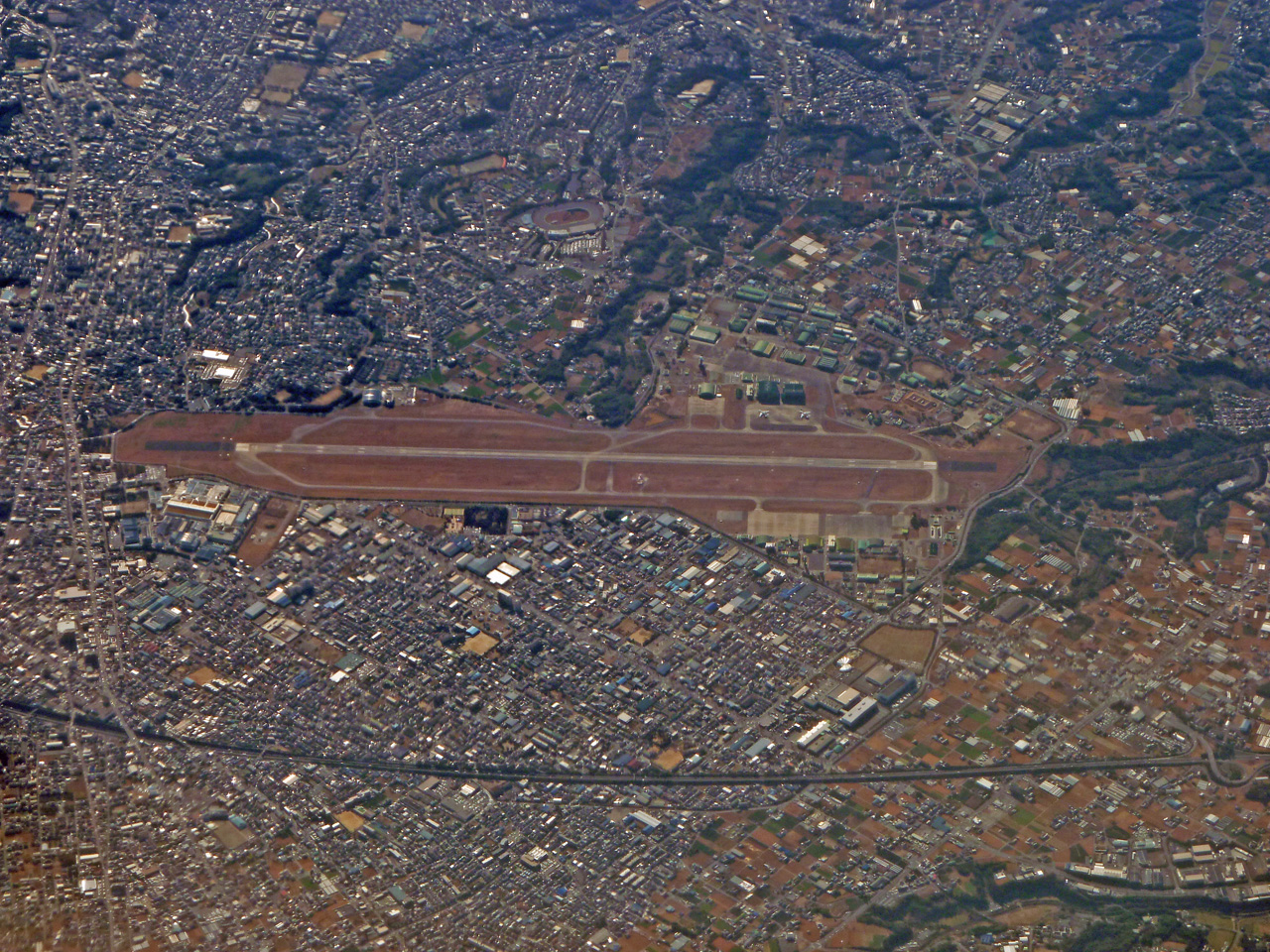
Hamamatsu Air Base

Hamamatsu Air Base (浜松基地, Hamamatsu-kichi) (ICAO: RJNH) is a Japan Air Self-Defense Force base located 3.0 NM (5.6 km; 3.5 mi) north of the city of Hamamatsu, Shizuoka Prefecture, in central Japan.

== History ==
Hamamatsu Air Base was established in 1925 as an Imperial Japanese Army Air Force base to be home to the newly formed IJAAF No.7 Air Regiment. In 1933, it was designated as the primary flight school for Japanese army aviation. After World War II, the base facilities were used as an emergency landing strip by the United States Air Force, and were returned to the Japanese government in 1952 for use as a flight training school for the nascent Japan Air Self-Defense Force.

The training syllabus was transformed in 1954 into separate schools for flight training, aircraft maintenance and communications. The base was divided into northern and southern areas in 1958, with the operational area in the north housing the 1st Air Wing, and from 1960, the Blue Impulse aerobatic squadron and the southern area housing the administrative and training facilities.

The Blue Impulse squadron was transferred to Matsushima Air Base in 1981; however the team suffered from a fatal mid-air collision during a farewell performance at Hamamatsu in 1982

The First Air Wing transitioned from Lockheed T-33A trainers to Kawasaki T-4 trainers in 1988. In a fiscal reform in 1989, the northern and southern halves of the base were reunited into a single administrative entity. From 1998, Hamamatsu Air Base became the home base of Japan's squadron of Boeing E-767 AWACS aircraft.

In 1999, an aviation museum, the JASDF Hamamatsu Air Base Publication Center (航空自衛隊浜松広報館, Hamamatsu Kōhōkan), was established. It has many aircraft from the history of the Japan Air Self-Defense Force on static display, and also a restored example of a World War II era A6M5 Zero.

In 2004, in celebration of the 50th anniversary of the Japan Air Self-Defense Force, Hamamatsu Air Base hosted a display by the U.S. Air Force Thunderbirds aerobatic display team.

From 2008, the MIM-104 Patriot missile has been deployed at Hamamatsu Air Base.

== Organization ==
Hamamatsu Air Base is currently headquarters to the JASDF Air Training Command. Units currently based at Hamamatsu include:

- 1st Air Wing
  - 31st Training Squadron (Kawasaki T-4)
  - 32nd Training Squadron (Kawasaki T-4)
- Airborne Early Warning Group
  - 602nd Squadron (Boeing E-767)
- Air Basic Training Wing
- Air Rescue Wing Hamamatsu Detachment (U-125A, UH-60J)
- Hamamatsu Anti-Aircraft Missile Group
- Air Officer Training School
- 1st & 2nd Technical School
- Air Training Aids Group
- Air Traffic Control Group
- Air Weather Service Group
- Hamamatsu Air Police Group
