= Airborne early warning and control =

Airborne system of surveillance radar plus command and control functions

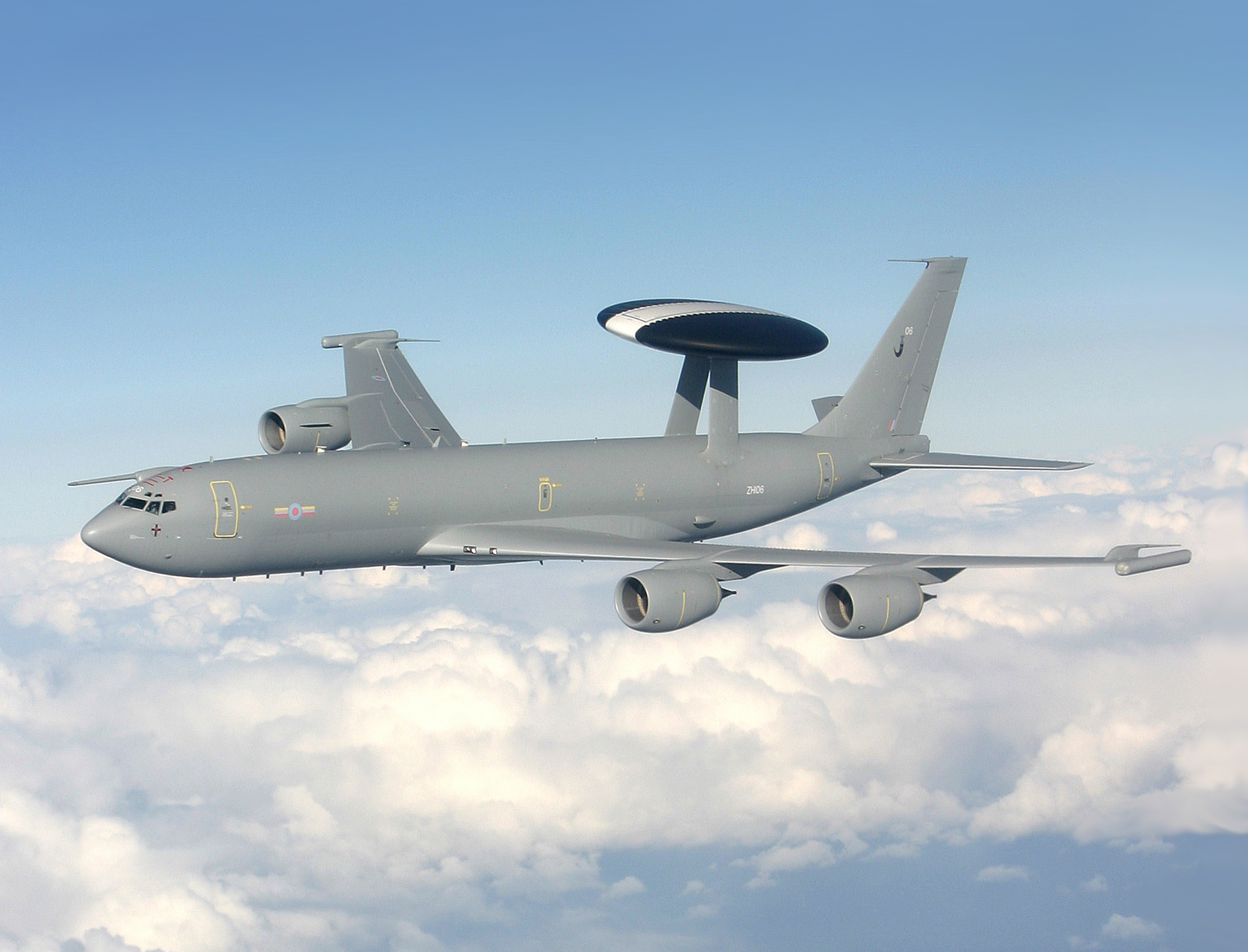
A Royal Air Force Boeing E-3 Sentry over North Yorkshire

An airborne early warning and control (AEW&C) system is an airborne radar early warning system designed to detect aircraft, ships, vehicles, missiles and other incoming projectiles at long ranges, as well as performing command and control of the battlespace in aerial engagements by informing and directing friendly fighter and attack aircraft. AEW&C units are also used to carry out aerial surveillance over ground and maritime targets, and frequently perform battle management command and control (BMC2). When used at altitude, the radar system on AEW&C aircraft allows the operators to detect, track and prioritize targets and identify friendly aircraft from hostile ones in real-time and from much farther away than ground-based radars. Like ground-based radars, AEW&C systems can be detected and targeted by opposing forces, but due to aircraft mobility and extended sensor range, they are much less vulnerable to counter-attacks than ground systems.

AEW&C aircraft are used for both defensive and offensive air operations, and serve air forces in the same role as what the combat information center is to naval warships, in addition to being a highly mobile and powerful radar platform. So useful and advantageous is it to have such aircraft operating at a high altitude, that some navies also operate AEW&C aircraft for their warships at sea, either coastal- or carrier-based and on both fixed-wing and rotary-wing platforms. In the case of the United States Navy, the Northrop Grumman E-2 Hawkeye AEW&C aircraft is assigned to its supercarriers to protect them and augment their onboard command information centers (CICs). The designation "airborne early warning" (AEW) was used for earlier similar aircraft used in the less-demanding radar picket role, such as the Fairey Gannet AEW.3 and Lockheed EC-121 Warning Star, and continues to be used by the RAF for its Sentry AEW1, while AEW&C (airborne early warning and control) emphasizes the command and control capabilities that may not be present on smaller or simpler radar picket aircraft. AWACS (Airborne Warning and Control System) is the name of the specific system installed in the American Boeing E-3 Sentry and Japanese Boeing E-767 AEW&C airframes, but is often used as a general synonym for AEW&C.

== General characteristics ==
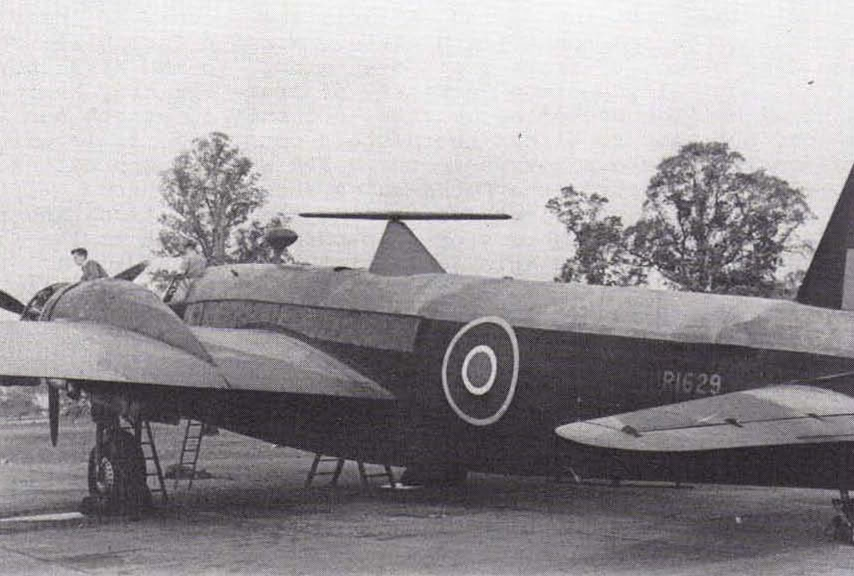
Wellington Ic "Air Controlled Interception" showing rotating radar antenna

Modern AEW&C systems can detect aircraft from up to 400 km (220 nmi) away, well out of range of most surface-to-air missiles (SAM). One AEW&C aircraft flying at 9,000 m (30,000 ft) can cover an area of 312,000 km^{2} (120,000 sq mi). Three such aircraft in overlapping orbits can cover the whole of Central Europe. AEW&C system indicates close and far proximity range on threats and targets, help extend the range of their sensors, and make offensive aircraft harder to track by avoiding the need for them to keep their own radar active, which the enemy can detect. Systems also communicate with friendly aircraft, vectoring fighters towards hostile aircraft or any unidentified flying object (UFO).

== History of development ==
After having developed Chain Home—the first ground-based early-warning radar detection system—in the 1930s, the British developed a radar set that could be carried on an aircraft for what they termed "Air Controlled Interception". The intention was to cover the North West approaches where German long range Focke-Wulf Fw 200 Condor aircraft were threatening shipping. A Vickers Wellington bomber (serial R1629) was fitted with a rotating antenna array. It was tested for use against aerial targets and then for possible use against German E boats. Another radar equipped Wellington with a different installation was used to direct Bristol Beaufighters toward Heinkel He 111s, which were air-launching V-1 flying bombs.

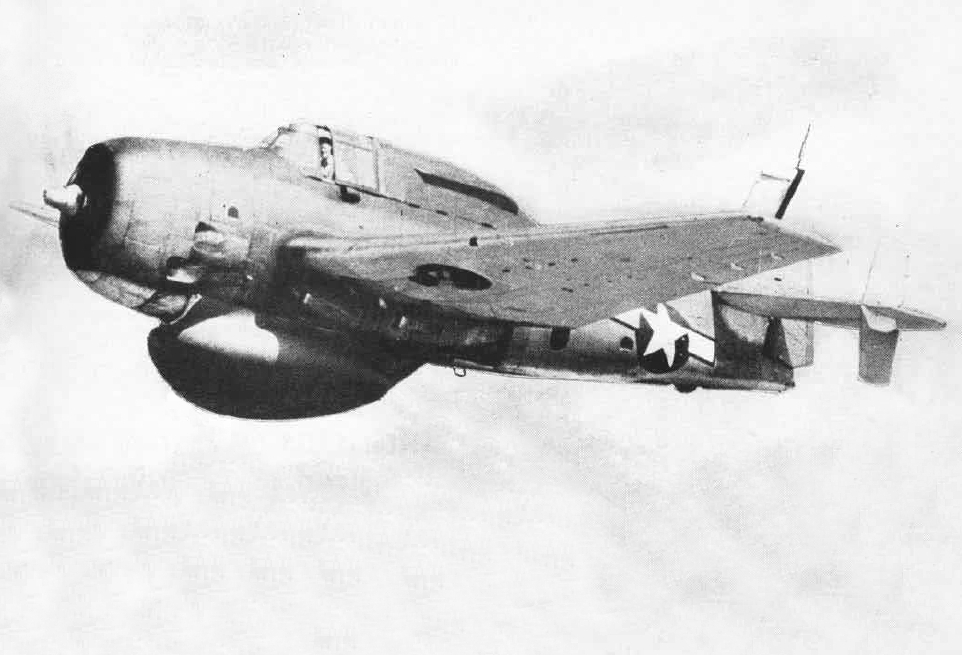
AEW radome on a torpedo bomber, c. 1946

In February 1944, the US Navy ordered the development of a radar system that could be carried aloft in an aircraft under Project Cadillac. A prototype system was built at the MIT Radiation Laboratory and flown in August on a modified TBM Avenger torpedo bomber. Tests were successful, with the system being able to detect low flying formations at a range greater than 100 miles (160 km). US Navy then ordered production of the TBM-3W, the first production AEW aircraft to enter service. TBM-3Ws fitted with the AN/APS-20 radar entered service in March 1945, with 27 eventually constructed. It was also recognised that a larger land-based aircraft would be attractive, thus, under the Cadillac II program, multiple Boeing B-17G Flying Fortress bombers were also outfitted with the same radar.

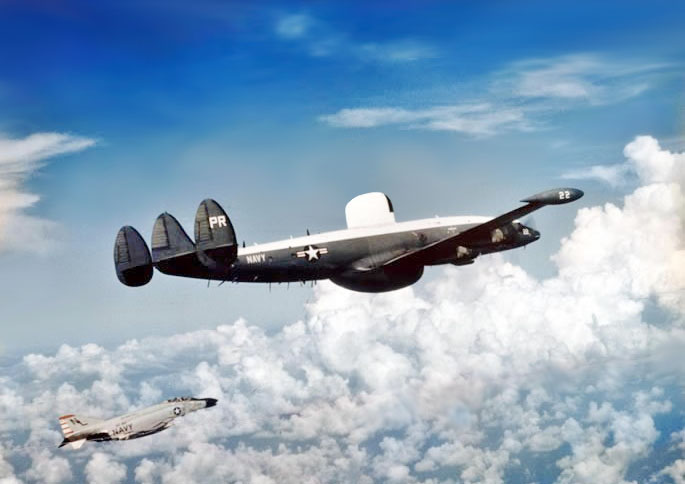
Lockheed EC-121, one of the first AEW aircraft

The Lockheed WV and EC-121 Warning Star, which first flew in 1949, served widely with the US Air Force and US Navy. It provided the main AEW coverage for US forces during the Vietnam war. It remained operational until replaced with the E-3 AWACS. Developed roughly in parallel, N-class blimps were also used as AEW aircraft, filling gaps in radar coverage for the continental US, their tremendous endurance of over 200 hours being a major asset in an AEW aircraft. Following a crash, the US Navy opted to discontinue lighter than air operations in 1962.

In 1958, the Soviet Tupolev Design Bureau was ordered to design an AEW aircraft. After determining that the projected radar instrumentation would not fit in a Tupolev Tu-95 or a Tupolev Tu-116, the decision was made to use the more capacious Tupolev Tu-114 instead. This solved the problems with cooling and operator space that existed with the narrower Tu-95 and Tu-116 fuselage. To meet range requirements, production examples were fitted with an air-to-air refueling probe. The resulting system, the Tupolev Tu-126, entered service in 1965 with the Soviet Air Forces and remained in service until replaced by the Beriev A-50 in 1984.

During the Cold war, United Kingdom deployed a substantial AEW capability, initially with American Douglas AD-4W Skyraiders, designated Skyraider AEW.1, which in turn were replaced by the Fairey Gannet AEW.3, using the same AN/APS-20 radar. With the retirement of conventional aircraft carriers, the Gannet was withdrawn and the Royal Air Force (RAF) installed the radars from the Gannets on Avro Shackleton MR.2 airframes, redesignated Shackleton AEW.2. To replace the Shackleton AEW.2, an AEW variant of the Hawker Siddeley Nimrod, known as the Nimrod AEW3, was ordered in 1974. After a protracted and problematic development, this was cancelled in 1986, and seven E-3Ds, designated Sentry AEW.1 in RAF service, were purchased instead.

The US Defense Department is considering options to move the air moving target indicator (AMTI) mission component from AWACS aircraft to space-based platforms. The space-based sensor is already in orbit and in testing phase.

== Current systems ==
Many countries have developed their own AEW&C systems, although the Boeing E-3 Sentry, E-7A and Northrop Grumman E-2 Hawkeye and Gulfstream/IAI EL/W-2085 are the most common systems worldwide.

=== Airborne Warning and Control System (AWACS) ===
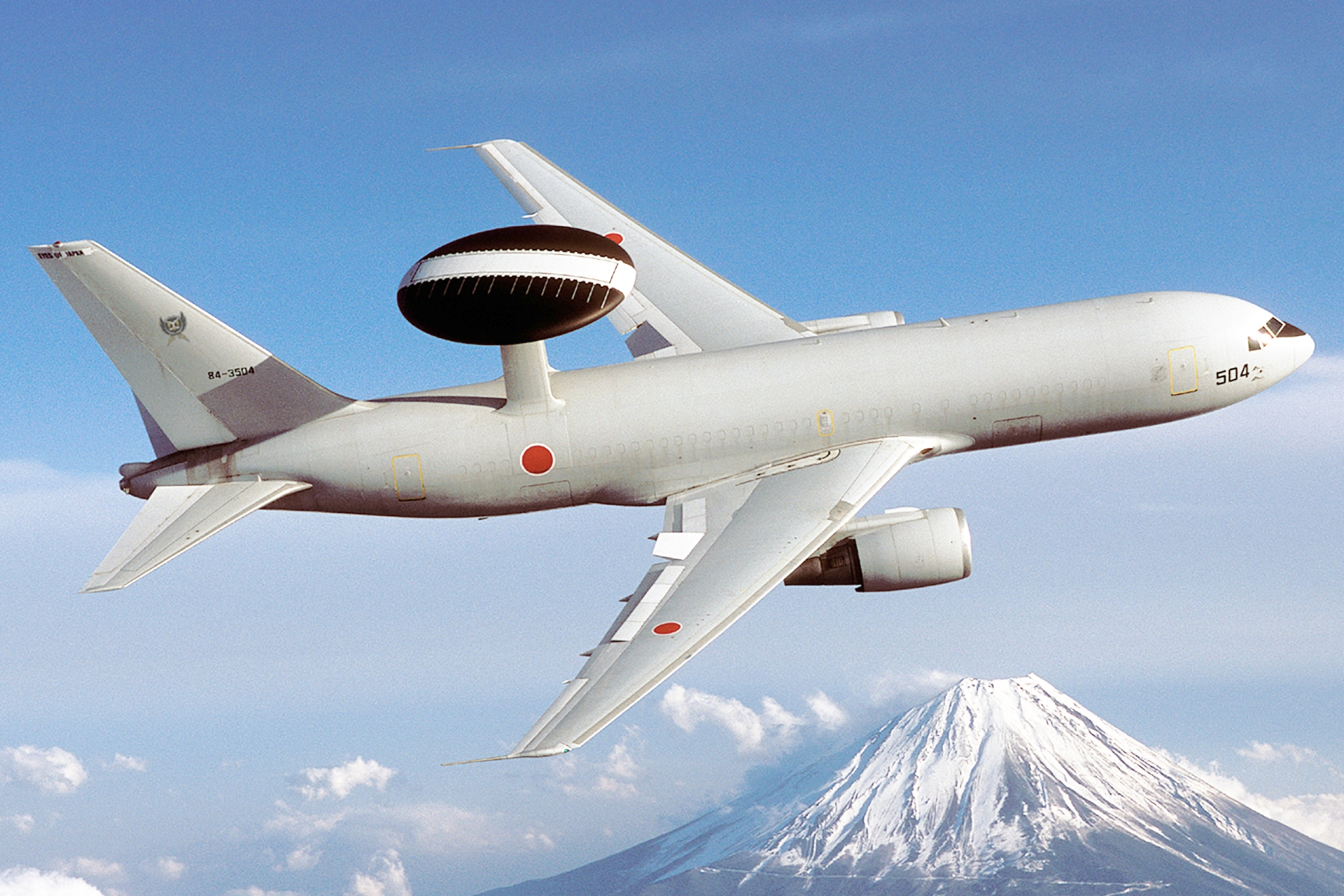
E-767 of the Japan Air Self Defense Force

Boeing produces a specific system with a "rotodome" rotating radome that incorporates Westinghouse (now Northrop Grumman) radar. It is mounted on either the E-3 Sentry aircraft (Boeing 707) or more recently the Boeing E-767 (Boeing 767), the latter only being used by the Japan Air Self-Defense Force.

When AWACS first entered service it represented a major advance in capability, being the first AEW to use a pulse-Doppler radar, which allowed it to track targets normally lost in ground clutter. Previously, low-flying aircraft could only be readily tracked over water. The AWACS features a three-dimensional radar that measures azimuth, range, and elevation simultaneously; the AN/APY-2 unit installed upon the E-767 and later E-3 models has superior surveillance capability over water compared to the AN/APY-1 system on the earlier E-3 models.

=== E-2 Hawkeye ===
The E-2 Hawkeye was a specially designed AEW aircraft. Upon its entry to service in 1965, it was initially plagued by technical issues, causing a (later reversed) cancellation. Procurement resumed after efforts to improve reliability, such as replacement of the original rotary drum computer used for processing radar information by a Litton L-304 digital computer. In addition to purchases by the US Navy, the E-2 Hawkeye has been sold to the armed forces of Egypt, France, Israel, Japan, Singapore and Taiwan.

The latest E-2 version is the E-2D Advanced Hawkeye, which features the new AN/APY-9 radar. The APY-9 radar has been speculated to be capable of detecting fighter-sized stealth aircraft, which are typically optimized against high frequencies like Ka, Ku, X, C and parts of the S-bands. Historically, UHF radars had resolution and detection issues that made them ineffective for accurate targeting and fire control; Northrop Grumman and Lockheed claim that the APY-9 has solved these shortcomings in the APY-9 using advanced electronic scanning and high digital computing power via space/time adaptive processing.

=== Beriev A-50 ===
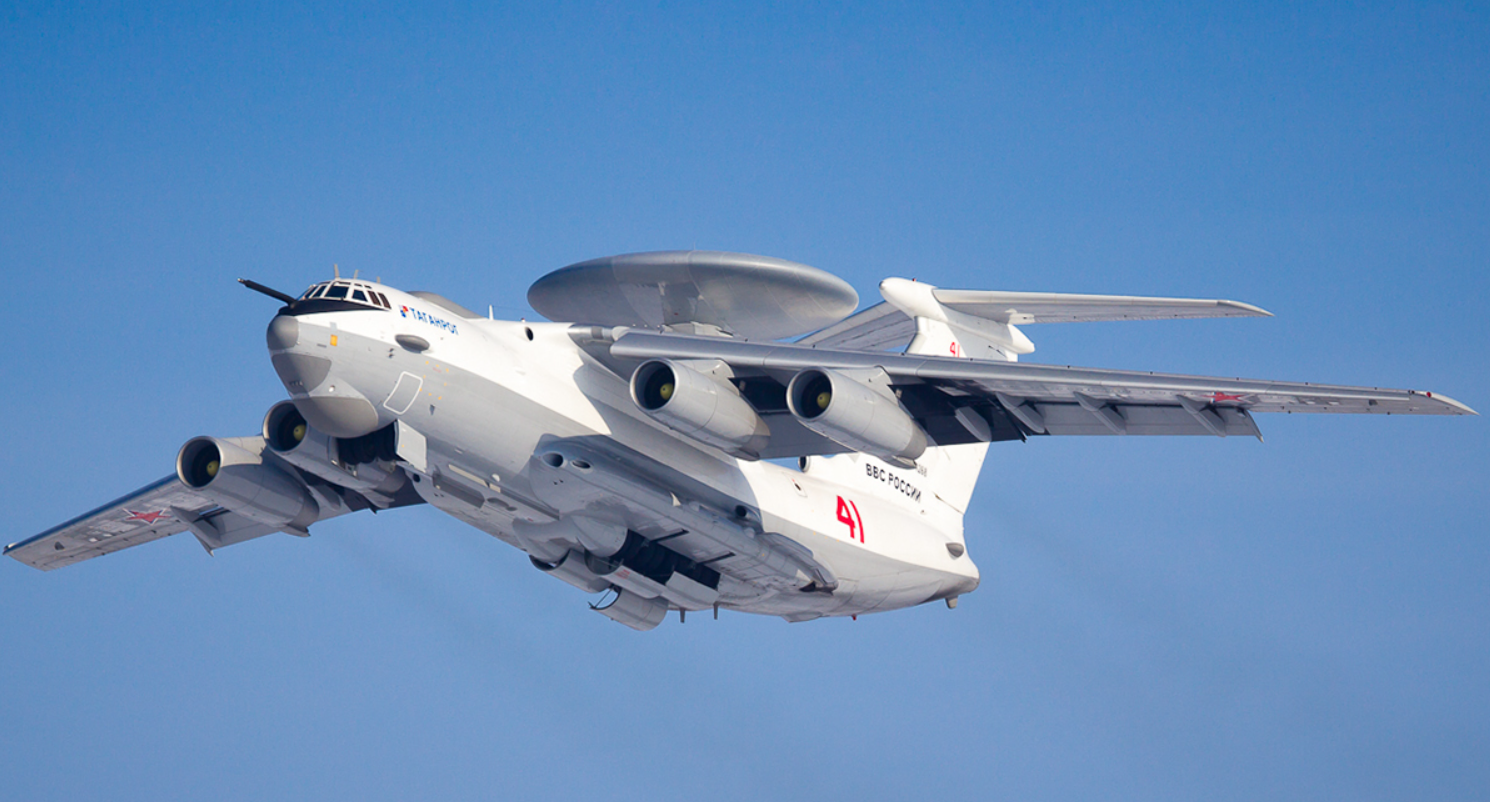
Beriev A-50

The Russian Aerospace Forces are currently using approximately 3-5 Beriev A-50 and A-50U "Shmel" in the AEW role. The "Mainstay" is based on the Ilyushin Il-76 airframe, with a large non-rotating disk radome on the rear fuselage. These replaced the 12 Tupolev Tu-126 that filled the role previously. The A-50 and A-50U will eventually be replaced by the Beriev A-100, which features an AESA array in the radome and is based on the updated Il-476.

In March 27th 2025, North Korea unveiled an indigenous AEW&C system based on the Il-76TD equipped with an AESA radar, similar in resemblance to the Beriev A-50.

=== KJ-2000 ===
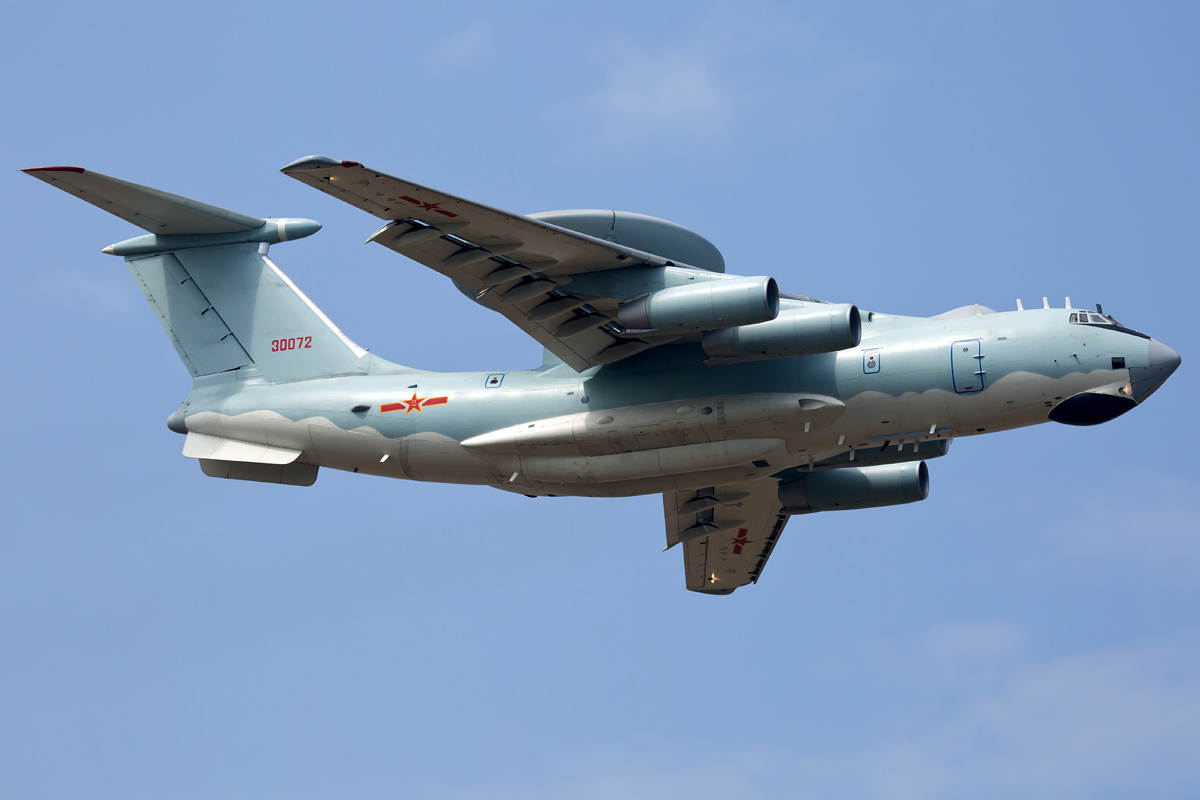
KJ-2000 at 2014 Zhuhai Air Show

In May 1997, Russia and Israel agreed to jointly fulfill an order from China to develop and deliver an early warning system. China reportedly ordered one Phalcon for $250 million, which entailed retrofitting a Russian-made Ilyushin Il-76 cargo plane [also incorrectly reported as a Beriev A-50 Mainstay] with advanced Elta electronic, computer, radar and communications systems. Beijing was expected to acquire several Phalcon AEW systems, and reportedly could buy at least three more [and possibly up to eight] of these systems, the prototype of which was planned for testing beginning in 2000. In July 2000, the US pressured Israel to back out of the $1 billion agreement to sell China four Phalcon phased-array radar systems. Following the cancelled A-50I/Phalcon deal, China turned to indigenous solutions. The Phalcon radar and other electronic systems were taken off from the unfinished Il-76, and the airframe was handed to China via Russia in 2002. The Chinese AWACS has a unique phased array radar (PAR) carried in a round radome. Unlike the US AWACS aircraft, which rotate their rotodomes to give a 360 degree coverage, the radar antenna of the Chinese AWACS does not rotate. Instead, three PAR antenna modules are placed in a triangular configuration inside the round radome to provide a 360 degree coverage. The installation of equipment at the Il-76 began in late 2002 aircraft by Xian aircraft industries (Xian Aircraft Industry Co.). The first flight of an airplane KJ-2000 made in November 2003. All four machines will be equipped with this type. The last to be introduced into service the Chinese Air Force until the end of 2007. China is also developing a carrier-based AEW&C, Xian KJ-600 via Y-7 derived Xian JZY-01 testbed.

=== KJ-200 ===
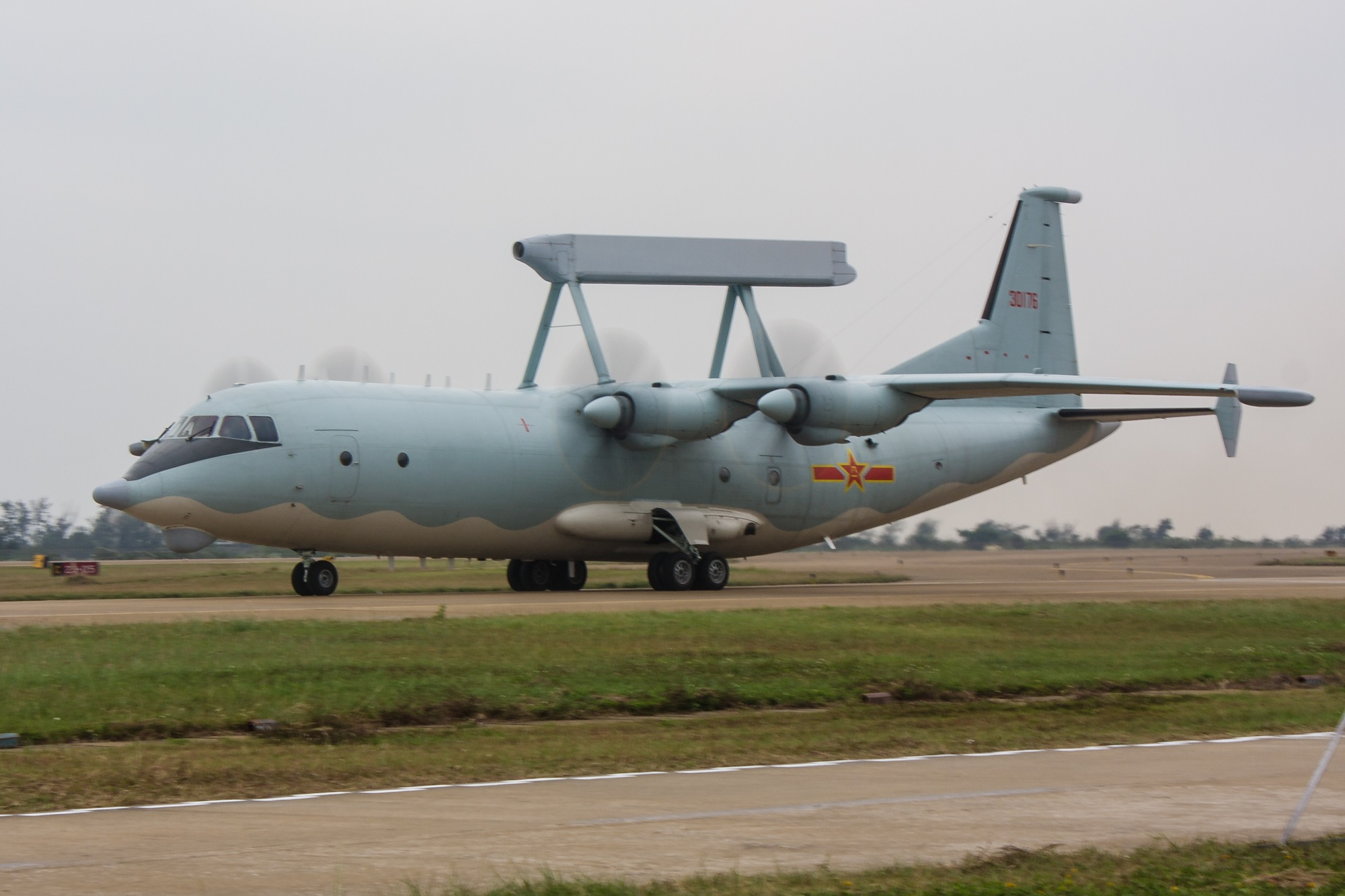

The KJ-200 is an AEW&C aircraft developed by the Shaanxi Aircraft Corporation of China. It is based upon the Shaanxi Y-8 military transport aircraft. 4 are in service within the PLAAF and 6 are in service within the PLANAF.

=== KJ-500 ===
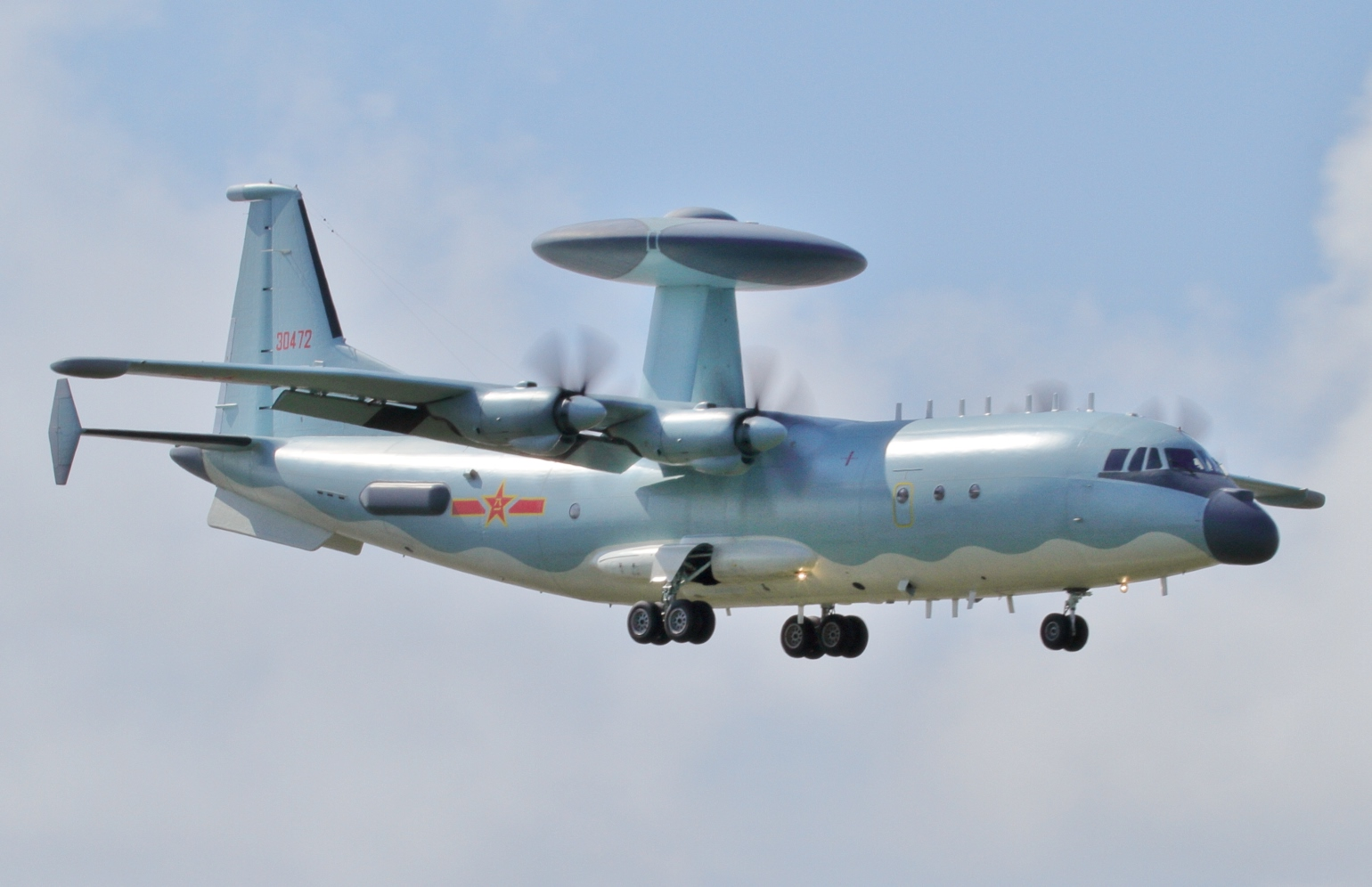
Y-9W (KJ-500) airborne early warning aircraft

The Shaanxi KJ-500 is a third-generation AEW&C aircraft. It was built by Shaanxi Aircraft Corporation. It's based upon the Y-9 platform. Currently 40 pieces are in service with the PLAAF and over 20 are in service within the PLANAF.

=== KJ-700 ===
The KJ-700 is an AEW&C aircraft built upon the Shaanxi Y-9 military transport aircraft. It will probably serve as a "multi-intelligence" aircraft, integrating both an airborne radar and an array of electro-optical and infrared sensors, which are likely to cover air, sea and land domains.

=== KJ-3000 ===
The aircraft is based on a modified Xi'an Y-20 platform powered by Shenyang WS-20 engines. It incorporates a new-generation active electronically scanned array (AESA) radar along with upgraded avionics and an air surveillance suite. Unlike earlier Chinese disc-shaped AEW&C aircraft such as the KJ-500 and KJ-2000, which have fixed radomes with three AESA arrays, the KJ-3000 features a rotating radome containing two AESA arrays.

=== EL/W-2085 AEW&C ===
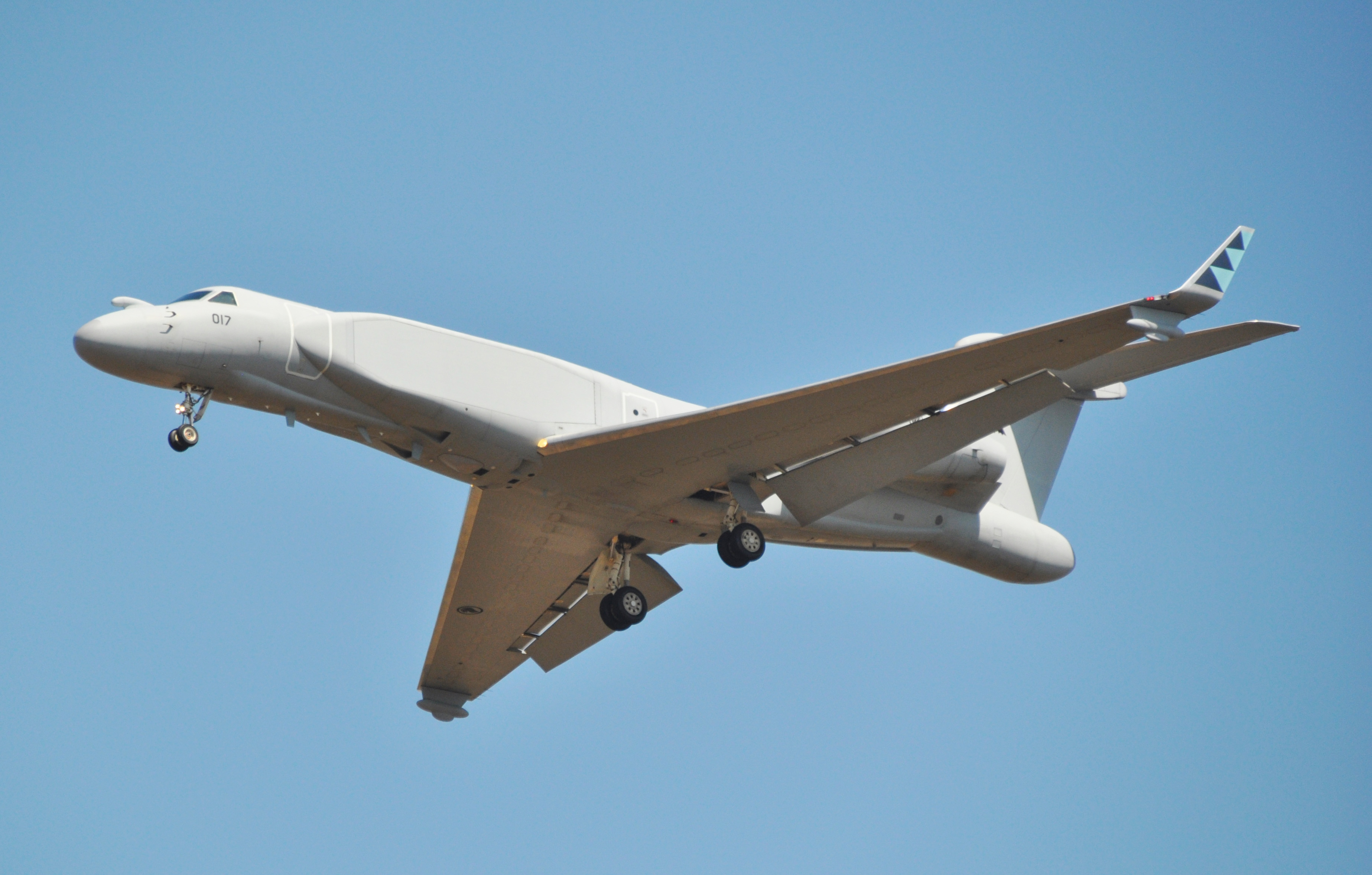
Republic of Singapore Air Force Gulfstream G550 CAEW

The EL/W-2085 is an airborne early warning and control (AEW&C) multi-band radar system developed by Israel Aerospace Industries (IAI) and its subsidiary Elta Systems of Israel. Its primary objective is to provide intelligence to maintain air superiority and conduct surveillance. The system is currently in service with Israel, Italy, and Singapore. Instead of using a rotodome, a moving radar was found on some AEW&C aircraft, and the EL/W-2085 used an active electronically scanned array (AESA) – an active phased array radar. This radar consists of an array of transmit/receive (T/R) modules that allow a beam to be electronically steered, making a physically rotating rotodome unnecessary.

AESA radars operate on a pseudorandom set of frequencies and also have very short scanning rates, which makes them difficult to detect and jam. Up to 1000 targets can be tracked simultaneously to a range of 243 mi (391 km), while at the same time, multitudes of air-to-air interceptions or air-to-surface (including maritime) attacks can be guided simultaneously. The radar equipment of the Israeli AEW&C consists of each L-band radar on the left and right sides of the fuselage and each S-band antenna in the nose and tail. The phased array allows aircraft positions on operator screens to be updated every 2–4 seconds rather than every 10 seconds, as is the case on the rotodome AWACS.

ELTA was the first company to introduce an Active Electronically Scanned Array Airborne (AESA) Early Warning Aircraft and implement advanced mission aircraft using efficient, high-performance business jet platforms.

=== Netra AEW&CS ===
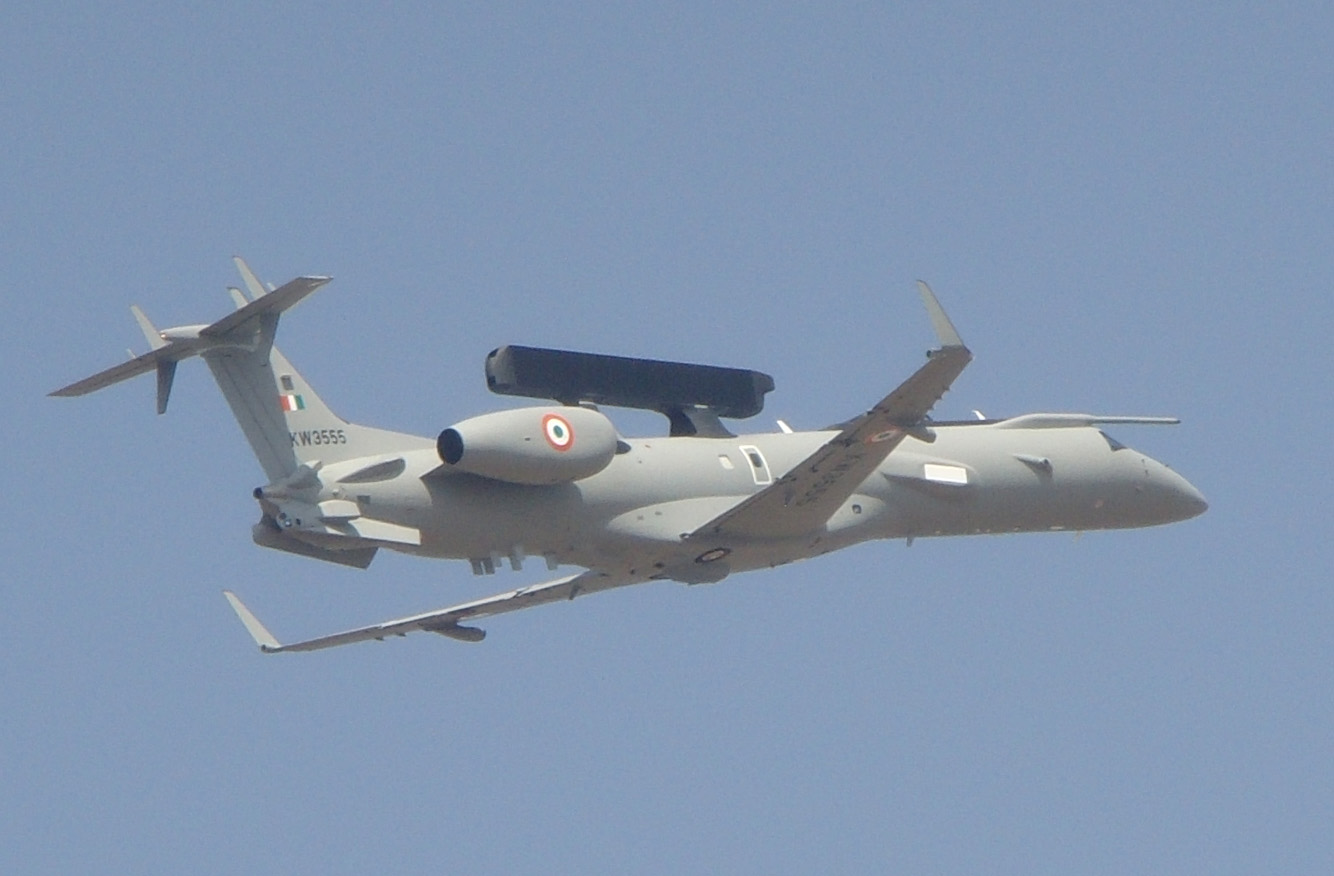
Netra AEW&CS in Aero India 2017

In 2003, the Indian Air Force (IAF) and Defence Research and Development Organisation (DRDO) began a study of requirements for developing an Airborne Early Warning and Control System (AEW&CS). In 2015, DRDO delivered three AEW&CSs, called Netra, to the IAF with an advanced Indian AESA radar system fitted on the Brazilian Embraer EMB-145 air frame. Netra gives a 240-degree coverage of airspace. The EMB-145 has air-to-air refuelling capability for longer surveillance time.

The IAF also operates three Israeli EL/W-2090 Phalcon systems, mounted on Ilyushin Il-76 airframes, the first of which first arrived on 25 May 2009. The DRDO proposed a more advanced AWACS with a longer range and with a 360-degree coverage akin to the EL/W-2090 system, based on the Airbus A330 airframe, but given the costs involved there is also the possibility of converting used A320 airliners as well.

IAF has plans to develop 6 more Netra AEW&CS based on Embraer EMB-145 platform and another 6 based on Airbus A321 platform. These systems are expected to have an enhanced performance including range and azimuth.

=== Boeing 737 AEW&C ===
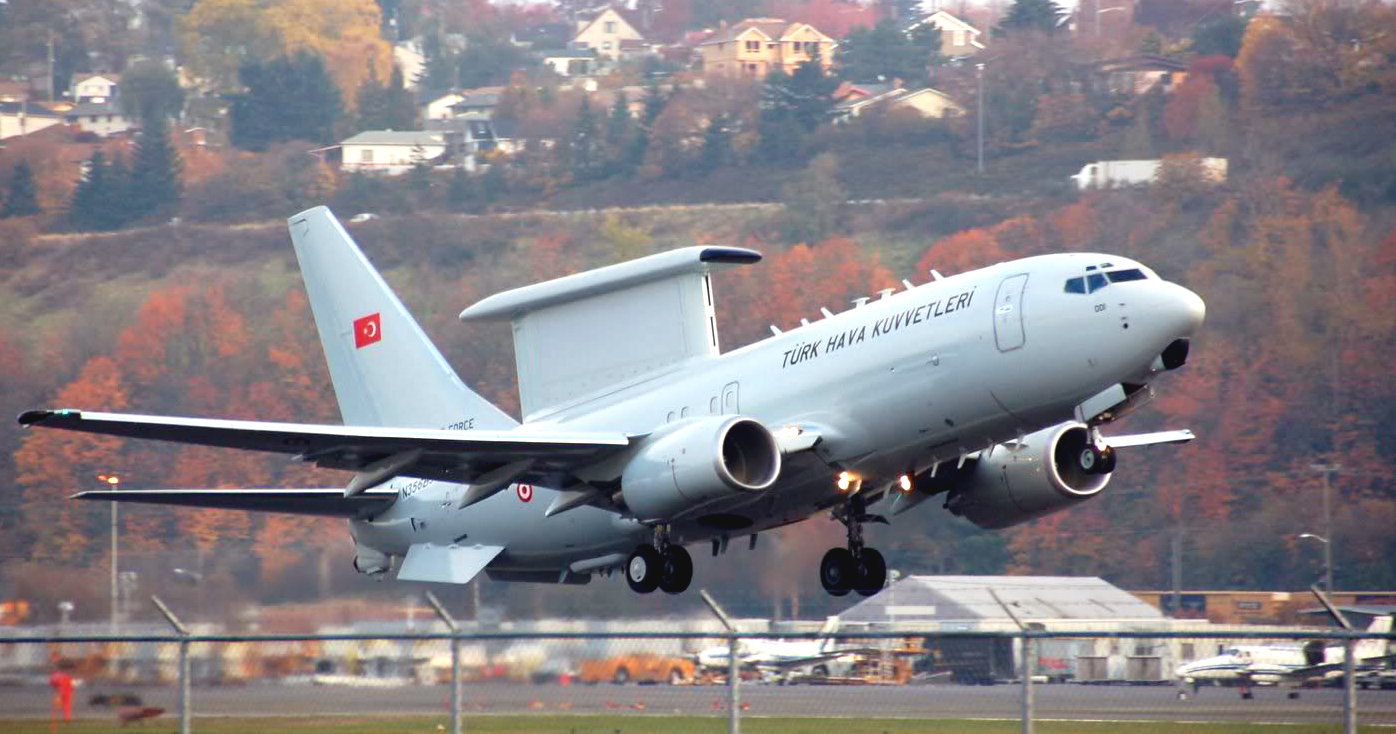
A Turkish Air Force Boeing 737 AEW&C

The Royal Australian Air Force, Republic of Korea Air Force and the Turkish Air Force are deploying Boeing 737 AEW&C aircraft. The Boeing 737 AEW&C has a fixed, active electronically scanned array radar antenna instead of a mechanically-rotating one, and is capable of simultaneous air and sea search, fighter control and area search, with a maximum range of over 600 km (370 mi) (look-up mode). In addition, the radar antenna array is also doubled as an ELINT array, with a maximum range of over 850 km (530 mi) at 9,000 metres (30,000 ft) altitude.

=== Erieye/GlobalEye ===
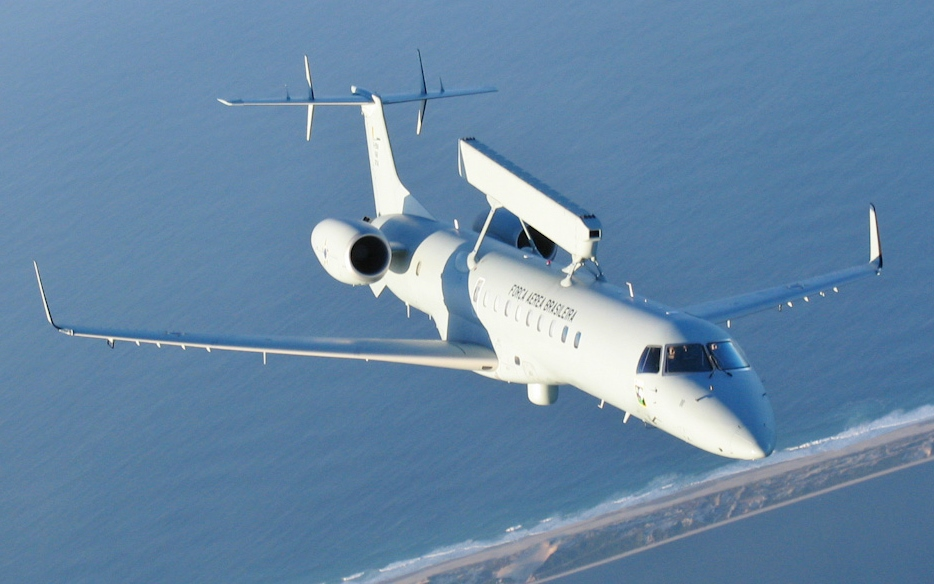
A Brazilian Air Force Embraer R-99

The Swedish Air Force uses the S 100D Argus ASC890 as its AEW platform. The S 100D Argus is based on the Saab 340 with an Ericsson Erieye PS-890 radar. Saab also offers the Bombardier Global 6000-based GlobalEye. In early 2006, the Pakistan Air Force ordered six Erieye AEW equipped Saab 2000s from Sweden. In December 2006, the Pakistan Navy requested three excess P-3 Orion aircraft to be equipped with Hawkeye 2000 AEW systems. China and Pakistan also signed a memorandum of understanding (MoU) for the joint development of AEW&C systems.

The Hellenic Air Force, Brazilian Air Force and Mexican Air Force use the Embraer R-99 with an Ericsson Erieye PS-890 radar, as on the S 100D.

=== Others ===
Israel has developed the IAI/Elta EL/M-2075 Phalcon system, which uses an AESA (active electronically scanned array) in lieu of a rotodome antenna. The system was the first such system to enter service. The original Phalcon was mounted on a Boeing 707 and developed for the Israeli Defense Force and for export. Israel uses IAI EL/W-2085 airborne early warning and control multi-band radar system on Gulfstream G550; this platform is considered to be both more capable and less expensive to operate than the older Boeing 707-based Phalcon fleet. North Korea appears to operate an AEW&C plane based on the Il-76. North Korean designation and design details are unclear.

== Helicopter AEW systems ==
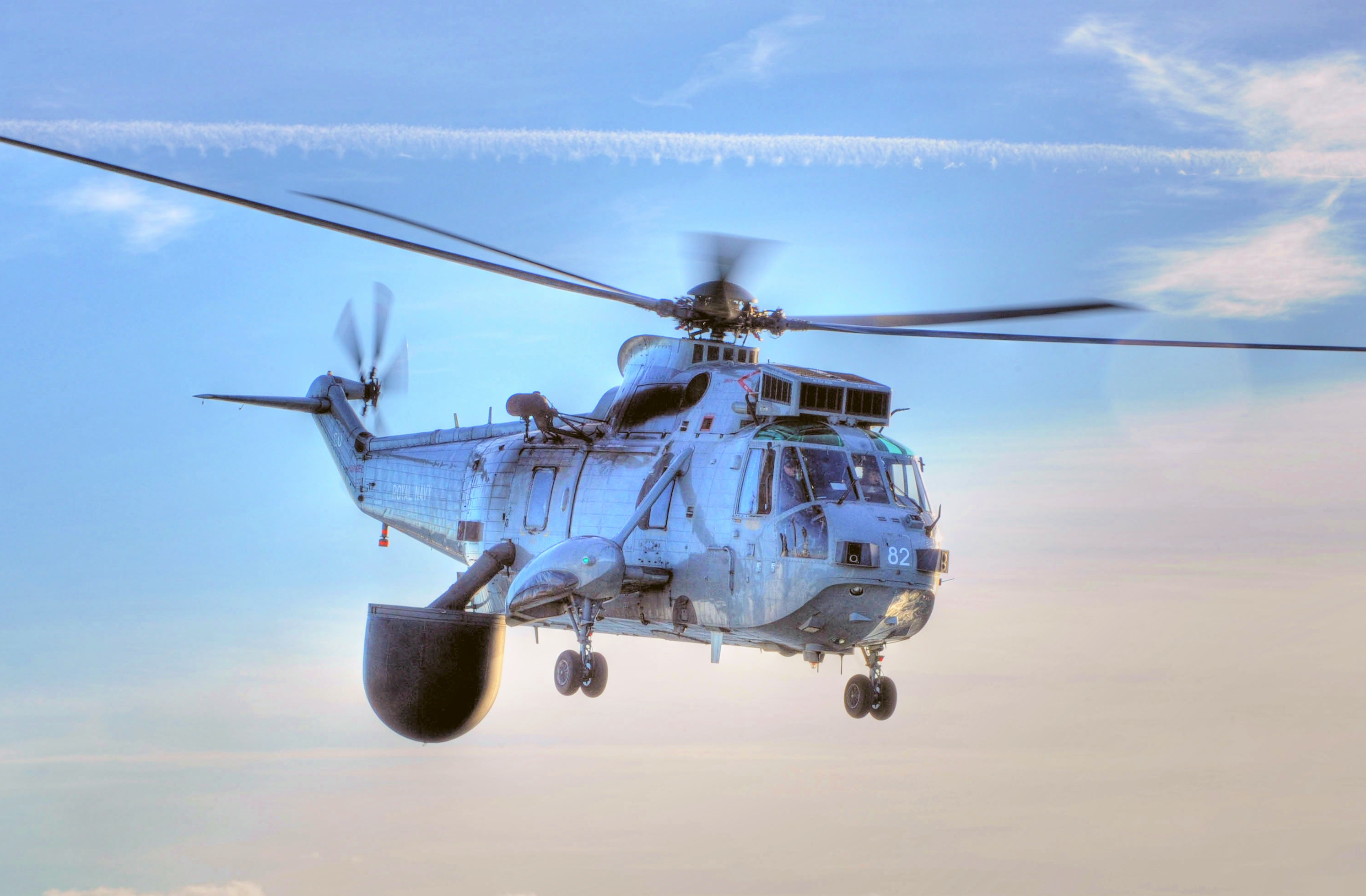
An AEW Westland Sea King helicopter of the Royal Navy

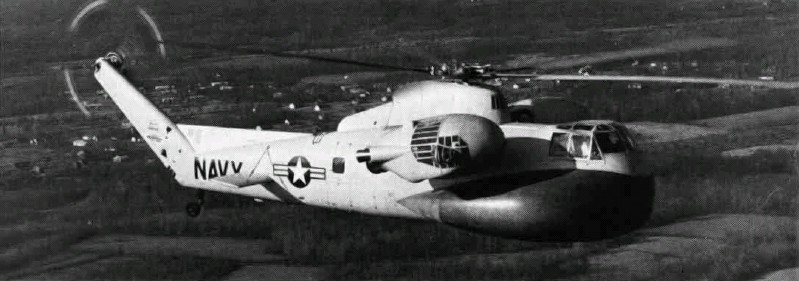
An AEW derivative of the Sikorsky CH-37 Mojave helicopter

On 3 June 1957, the first of 2 HR2S-1W, a derivative of the Sikorsky CH-37 Mojave, was delivered to the US Navy. It used the AN/APS-32 radar mounted in a prominent circular housing at the front, but proved unreliable due to vibration, as well as costly to operate and slow, and only two were built.

The British Sea King ASaC7 naval helicopter was operated from both the Invincible-class aircraft carriers and later the helicopter carrier HMS Ocean. The creation of Sea King ASaC7, and earlier AEW.2 and AEW.5 models, came as the consequence of lessons learnt by the Royal Navy during the 1982 Falklands War when the lack of AEW coverage for the task force was a major tactical handicap, and rendered them vulnerable to low-level attack. The Sea King was determined to be both more practical and responsive than the proposed alternative of relying on the RAF's land-based Shackleton AEW.2 fleet. The first examples were a pair of Sea King HAS2s that had the Thorn-EMI ARI 5980/3 Searchwater LAST radar attached to the fuselage on a swivel arm and protected by an inflatable dome. The improved Sea King ASaC7 featured the Searchwater 2000AEW radar, which was capable of simultaneously tracking up to 400 targets, instead of an earlier limit of 250 targets. The Spanish Navy fields the SH-3 Sea King in the same role, operated from the LPH Juan Carlos I.

The AgustaWestland EH-101A AEW of the Italian Navy is operated from the aircraft carriers Cavour and Giuseppe Garibaldi. During the 2010s, the Royal Navy opted to replace its Sea Kings with a modular "Crowsnest" system that can be fitted to any of their Merlin HM2 fleet. The Crowsnest system was partially based upon the Sea King ASaC7's equipment; an unsuccessful bid by Lockheed Martin had proposed using a new multi-functional sensor for either the AW101 or another aircraft.

The Russian-built Kamov Ka-31 is deployed by the Indian Navy on the aircraft carriers INS Vikramaditya and INS Vikrant and also on Talwar-class frigates. The Russian Navy has two Ka-31R variants, at least one of which was deployed on their aircraft carrier Admiral Kuznetsov in 2016. It is fitted with E-801M Oko (Eye) airborne electronic warfare radar that can track 20 targets simultaneously, detecting aircraft up to 150 km (90 mi) away, and surface warships up to 200 km (120 mi) distant.

The British Royal Air Force StormShroud drone helicopter is intended to carry on E-war operations, mainly radar jamming but also warning.

== See also ==
- List of airborne early warning aircraft
- List of AEW&C aircraft operators
- Airborne ground surveillance
- Airborne Launch Control Center
- Electronic-warfare aircraft
- Intelligence, surveillance, target acquisition, and reconnaissance
