= List of F-15 losses =

Losses of the F-15 fighter aircraft

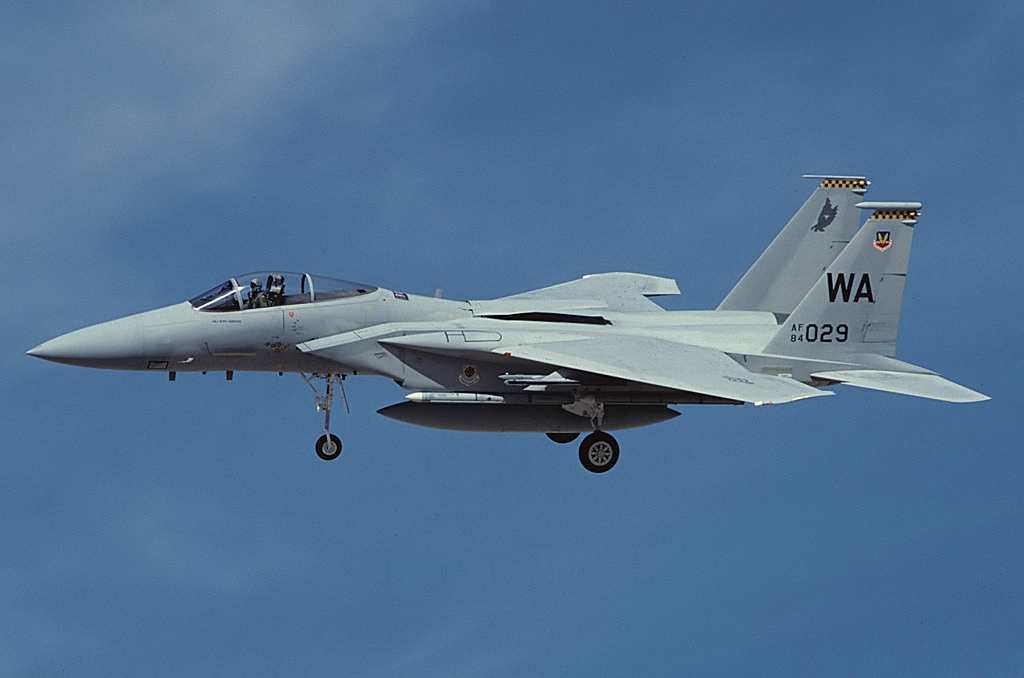
F-15C 84–0029 on 31 October 1989; it crashed six days later.

This is a list of losses involving the F-15 including the F-15 Eagle, F-15E Strike Eagle, F-15EX Eagle II, Mitsubishi F-15J and other F-15 variants.

== Accidents and losses ==
=== United States ===
As of April 2026, 151 USAF F-15 aircraft had been destroyed in mishaps, with 59 fatalities. This was a lifetime average of 2.93 aircraft destroyed per year, or 1.99 aircraft destroyed per 100,000 flight hours.

==== 1970s ====
- 14 October 1975: F-15A-7-MC, 73-0088, c/n 0027/A022, of the 555th TFTS, 58th TFTW, USAF, crashed W of Minersville, Utah, due to electrical smoke/fire from generator failure; pilot ejects safely. This was the first F-15 crash.
- 28 February 1977: F-15A, 74-0129, of the 433rd FWS, 57th FWW, USAF, mid-air collision with an F-5E, Nellis AFB, Nevada. Pilot ejected and survived.
- 6 December 1977: F-15B, 75-0085, of the 433rd FWS, 57th FWW, USAF, crashed at Nellis AFB, both crew killed.
- 8 February 1978: F-15A, 73-0087, of the 555th TFTS, 58th TFTW, USAF, lost in a ground incident.
- 17 April 1978: F-15A, 75-0059, of the 525th TFS, 36th TFW, USAF, crashed into the North Sea off Cromer, Norfolk, UK. Pilot lived.
- 15 June 1978: F-15A, 76-0047, of the 53rd TFS, 36th TFW, USAF, crashed into the North Sea. Pilot ejected and survived.
- 6 July 1978: F-15A, 76-0053, of the 53rd TFS, 36th TFW, USAF, crashed near Ahlhorn, West Germany. Pilot was killed.
- 1 September 1978: F-15A, 75-0018, of the 71st TFS, 1st TFW, USAF, crashed into the Atlantic Ocean off Norfolk, VA.
- 19 December 1978: F-15A, 75-0063, of the 525th TFS, 36th TFW, USAF, crashed near Ahlhorn, West Germany. Pilot ejected and survived.
- 28 December 1978: F-15A, 75-0064, of the 22nd TFS, 36th TFW, USAF, crashed near Daun, West Germany. Pilot ejected and survived.
- 29 December 1978: F-15A, 74-0136, of the 433rd FWS, 57th FWW, USAF, crashed on Nellis AFB.
- 16 February 1979: F-15A, 77-0107, of the 9th TFS, 49th TFW, USAF, crashed on Nellis AFB.
- 12 March 1979: F-15A, 77-0076, of the 9th TFS, 49th TFW, USAF, crashed near El Paso, TX.
- 25 April 1979: F-15B, 77-0167, of McDonnell Douglas, crashed near Fredericktown, Missouri. Test pilot killed.
- 3 June 1979: F-15A, 76-0035, of the 53rd TFS, 36th TFW, USAF, crashed on takeoff at Bitburg Air Base, West Germany.
- 13 September 1979: F-15A, 76-0085, of the 57th FWW, USAF, crashed on Nellis AFB.
- 3 October 1979: F-15A, 77-0072, of the 9th TFS, 49th TFW, USAF, crashed near NAS Fallon, NV after colliding with F-15A 77-0061 which landed safely.

==== 1980s ====
- 4 March 1980: F-15A, 75-0070, of the 22nd TFS, 36th TFW, USAF, crashed near Baden-Baden, West Germany.
- 6 March 1980: F-15A, 76-0082, of the 22nd TFS, 36th TFW, USAF, crashed near Bitburg Air Base, West Germany.
- 10 March 1980: F-15A, 75-0023, of the 27th TFS, 1st TW, USAF, burned on flight line, Langley AFB, VA.
- 25 July 1980: F-15A, 76-0013, of the 525th TFS, 36th TFW, USAF, crashed near Spangdahlem, West Germany.
- 21 January 1981: F-15B, 77-0164, of the 57th FWW, USAF, destroyed in a mid-air collision with an F-5E. Both crew killed as well as F-5E crew.
- 17 February 1981: F-15A, 76-0065, of the 555th TFTS, 405th TTW, USAF, crashed into the Pacific Ocean. Pilot ejected but did not survive.
- 23 June 1981: F-15C, 79-0040, of the 525th TFS, 36th TFW, USAF, crashed near Bremen, West Germany.
- 12 September 1981: F-15C-27-MC, 80-0007, c/n 0642/C156, of the 22nd TFS, 36th TFW, USAF, crashed while attempting to land during an airshow at Soesterberg AB Netherlands. Aircraft had just been delivered to the 36th TFW and had only 9.5 hours on the clock. Pilot did not eject but was safe.
- 2 November 1981: F-15A, 75-0051, of the 59th TFS, 33rd TFW, USAF, destroyed in a mid-air collision with F-15 76-0048. Pilot of 75-0051 killed, but F-15 76-0048 landed safely.
- 15 December 1981: F-15A, 73-0106, of the 461st TFTS, 58th TFTW, USAF, crashed near Phoenix, Arizona. Pilot died.
- 6 April 1982: F-15C, 78-0524, of the 12th TFS, 18th TFW, USAF, crashed into the Pacific Ocean near Okinawa. Pilot ejected and survived.
- 22 December 1982: F-15C, 80-0025, assigned to the 525th TFS, 36th TFW, USAF, crashed near Herschbach, West Germany shortly after takeoff from Bitburg AB on a Zulu Alert training sortie. Pilot Capt. Jeff "Wedge" Roether of the 53rd TFS was killed, no ejection was attempted. The accident board found that a recurring cabin pressure problem that caused the pilot to lose consciousness was the cause of the crash.
- 28 December 1982: F-15C, 78-0481, of the 67th TFS, 18th TFW, USAF, collided with F-15C 78-0540 and crashed in the Pacific Ocean near Okinawa. Pilot ejected and survived.
- 28 December 1982: F-15C, 78-0540, of the 67th TFS, 18th TFW, USAF, collided with F-15C 78-0481 and crashed in the Pacific Ocean near Okinawa. Pilot was killed.
- 4 January 1983: F-15C, 80-0036, of the 94th TFS, 1st TFW, USAF, crashed into the Atlantic Ocean off North Carolina. Pilot ejected and survived.
- 4 February 1983: F-15A, 76-0081, of the 59th TFS, 33rd TFW, USAF, crashed into the Gulf of Mexico near Tyndall AFB. Pilot ejected and survived.
- 9 May 1983: F-15A, 77-0094, of the 7th TFS, 49th TFW, USAF, crashed at White Sands MR, New Mexico. Pilot ejected and survived.
- 1 June 1983: F-15C, 79-0071, of the 53rd TFS, 36th TFW, USAF, collided with F-15C 80-0008 and crashed near Kusel, West Germany. Pilot ejected and survived.
- 1 June 1983: F-15C, 80-0008, of the 53rd TFS, 36th TFW, USAF, collided with F-15C 79-0071 and crashed near Kusel, West Germany. Pilot was killed.
- 10 June 1983: F-15A, 75-0076, of the 59th TFS, 33rd TFW, USAF, collided with F-5E 74-1509. F-15A pilot ejected and survived. F-5E pilot was killed.
- 9 March 1984: F-15A, 74-0094, of the 43rd TFS, 21st TFW, USAF, crashed near Goose Bay, Alaska. Pilot ejected and survived.
- 10 April 1984: F-15C, 79-0044, of the 525th TFS, 36th TFW, USAF, crashed near Lommersdorf, West Germany. Pilot ejected and survived.
- 17 August 1984: F-15B, 74-0139, of the 43rd TFS, 21st TFW, USAF, crashed into a mountain in low visibility near Elmendorf AFB, Alaska. Crew were both killed.
- 17 August 1984: F-15B, 75-0087, of the 1st TFTS, 325th TTW, USAF, collided with F-4E 68-0535 and crashed into the Gulf of Mexico. One dead, two survivors. F-15B pilot survived, no other crew aboard the two seat F-15B.
- 20 March 1985: F-15A, 74-0120, of the 43rd TFS, 21st TFW, USAF, crashed into the Yellow Sea near Kunsan AB, South Korea. Pilot was killed.
- 24 June 1985: F-15A, 74-0087, of the 43rd TFS, 21st TFW, USAF, crashed on takeoff in the Yukon River, Alaska. Pilot was killed.
- 9 September 1985: F-15A, 74-0090, of the 43rd TFS, 21st TFW, USAF, crashed near Goose Bay, Alaska. Pilot ejected and survived.
- 16 December 1985: F-15D-37-MC, 84-0042, c/n 0909/D050, of the 3246th TW, crashed into the Gulf of Mexico near Eglin AFB, Florida. Both crew survived.
- 2 January 1986: F-15C, 80-0037, of the 57th FIS, USAF, crashed into the Atlantic Ocean near Iceland. Pilot was killed.
- 7 January 1986: F-15C, 79-0061, of the 525th TFS, 36th TFW, USAF, crashed after colliding with F-15C 80-0032 near Rimschweiler, West Germany. Pilot ejected and survived.
- 7 January 1986: F-15C, 80-0032, of the 525th TFS, 36th TFW, USAF, crashed after colliding with F-15C 79-0061 near Rimschweiler, West Germany. Pilot was killed.
- 15 January 1986: F-15A, 76-0023, of the 5th FIS, crashed into the top of a ridge in the Guadalupe Mountains, near the White Sands Missile Range. Pilot was killed.
- 7 March 1986: F-15A, 76-0055, of the 426th TFTS, 405th TTW, USAF, crashed after a mid-air collision with F-15 76-0074 near Luke AFB. Pilot of one ejected and survived, the other did not eject and was killed.
- 7 March 1986: F-15A, 76-0074, of the 426th TFTS, 405th TTW, USAF, crashed after a mid-air collision with F-15 76-0055 near Luke AFB. The pilot of one ejected and survived, the other did not eject and was killed.
- 9 June 1986: F-15A 78-0472, of the 67th TFS, 18th TFW, USAF, crashed into the Pacific Ocean near Kadana AB, Okinawa. Pilot ejected and survived.
- 12 September 1986: F-15A, 77-0153, of the 9th TFS, 49th TFW, USAF, crashed after colliding with F-15A 77-0083. Pilot ejected and survived. The 2nd F-15A landed safely.
- 9 March 1987: F-15A, 77-0075, of the 9th TFS, 49th TFW, USAF, crashed near Holloman AFB, New Mexico. Pilot was killed.
- 19 May 1987: F-15C, 78-0495, of the 44th TFS, 18th TFW, USAF, crashed into the Pacific Ocean near Kadena AB, Okinawa. Pilot ejected and survived.
- 8 June 1987: F-15C, 81-0056, of the 27th TFS, 1st TFW, USAF, crashed 15 miles east of Farmville, Virginia in Amelia County, Virginia. Pilot was killed.
- 1 October 1987: F-15A, 75-0027, of the 1st TFTS, 325th TTW, USAF, crashed in the Apalachicola National Forest, Florida. Pilot ejected and survived.
- 24 November 1987: F-15A, 75-0056, of the 128th TFS, 116th TFW, Georgia ANG, crashed near Wadley, Georgia, after a mid-air collision with F-16B 79-0419. F-15A pilot ejected and survived. Stock car racer Bill Elliott was in the rear seat of the two seat F-16B, which recovered following the collision and landed safely.
- 8 November 1988: F-15C, 80-0017, of the 21st TFW, crashed in low visibility into Barometer Mountain near Kodiak, Alaska. The pilot was killed.
- 1 May 1989: F-15B, 76-0138, c/n 0295/B040, of the 95th TFTS, crashed into the Gulf of Mexico near Tyndall AFB. The pilot was killed and apparently did not eject.
- 18 May 1989: F-15A, 76-0056, of the 2nd TFTS, 325th TFTW hit a support wire holding up a microwave relay tower near Frink, Florida. The pilot successfully recovered the stricken aircraft, albeit with extensive damage.
- 8 July 1989: F-15C, 85-0109, of the 58th TFS, 33rd TFW, crashed near Lamison, Alabama. Pilot ejected and survived.
- 10 August 1989: F-15A, 77-0101, of the 49th TFW, Holloman AFB, crashed at White Sands Missile Range, New Mexico. Pilot ejected and survived.
- 6 November 1989: F-15C, 84-0029, crashed near Las Vegas, Nevada. Pilot ejected and survived.
- 28 December 1989: F-15C, 86-0153, of the 59th TFS, 33 TFW, Eglin AFB, FL crashed into the Gulf of Mexico near Apalachicola, Florida. Pilot was killed.

==== 1990s ====
- 16 January 1990: F-15D, 80-0059, of the 21st TFW, crashed into Mount Susitna, Alaska in reduced visibility. Pilot was killed, no others aboard the 2-seat aircraft.
- 24 January 1990: F-15C, 78-0534, of the 18th TFW, crashed in the South China Sea near Clark AFB, Philippines, after colliding with F-15C, 78-0520, which landed safely. Pilot was missing, presumed dead.
- 15 March 1990: F-15A, 76-0069, of the 426th TFTS, crashed near Wenden, Arizona.
- 25 April 1990: F-15C, 81-0049, of the 32nd TFS, crashed in the North Sea off Spurn Head, East Riding of Yorkshire, UK. Pilot ejected and survived.
- 30 September 1990: F-15E, 87-0203, of the 336th TFS, crashed near Thumrait, Oman. Both crew were killed.
- 24 October 1990: F-15C, 79-0067, of the 22d TFS, crashed into the Mediterranean Sea off Decimomannu Air Base, Sardinia, Italy. Pilot ejected and survived.
- 17/18 January 1991: F-15E-46-MC, 88‑1689, c/n 1098/E073, of the 335th FS, 4th TFW, USAF, was shot down by anti-aircraft artillery on the first day of Operation Desert Storm.
- 19/20 January 1991: F-15E-46-MC, 88‑1692, c/n 1101/E076, of the 336th FS, 4th TFW, USAF, was shot down by an Iraqi SA-2E missile during Operation Desert Storm. Both crew members ejected and were POWs.
- 27 March 1991: F-15C, 78-0526, of the 12th TFS, 18th TFW, crashed near Osan Air Base, South Korea. Pilot ejected and survived.

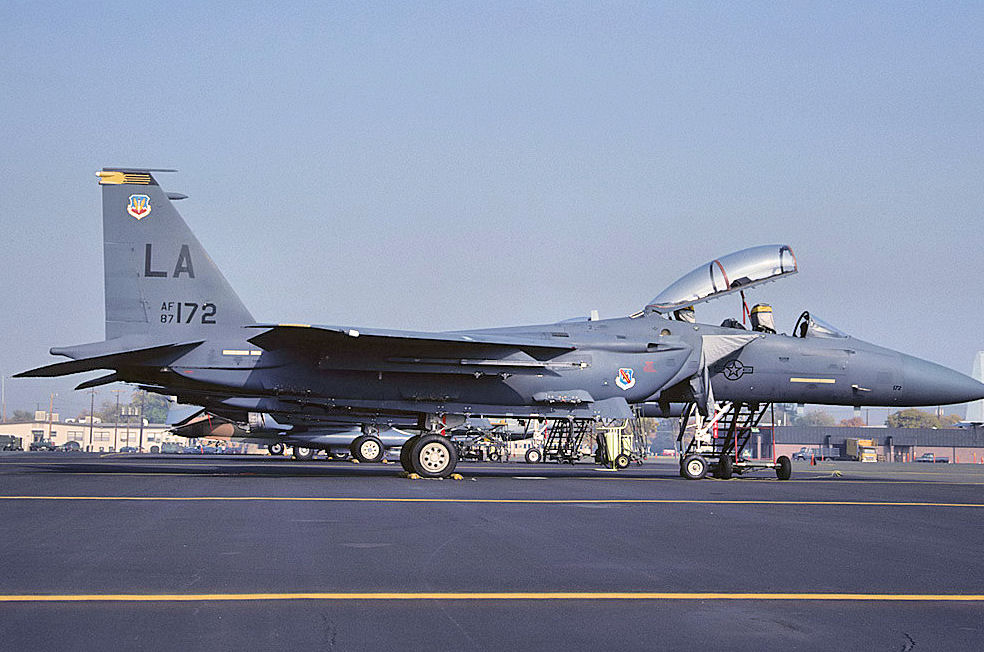
F-15E 87–0172 in 1990; it crashed 16 September 1991.

- 16 September 1991: F-15E-43-MC, 87-0172, c/n 1037/E012, of the 461st TFS, 405th TTW, crashed 42 nautical miles south-south-west of Gila Bend, AZ. Both crew members survived.
- 15 January 1992: F-15A, 75-0071, of the 128th TFS, 116th TFW, Georgia ANG, crashed in eastern Tennessee after colliding with F-15A 75-0075. Pilot ejected and survived. 75-0075 landed at McGhee Tyson Airport, near Knoxville, TN.
- 21 January 1992: F-15C, 81-0052, of the 57th FW, crashed at Nellis AFB, Nevada. Pilot ejected and survived.
- 22 April 1992: F-15C, 80-0023, of the 22nd TFS, 36th TFW, crashed near Dinkelsbühl, West Germany. Pilot was killed.
- 13 July 1992: F-15C, 85-0116, of the 60th TFS, Eglin AFB, crashed in the Gulf of Mexico. The pilot ejected and survived.
- 10 August 1992: F-15E, 89-0479, of the 57th FWW, crashed in Nevada. Both crew killed.
- 30 November 1992: F-15C, 83-0021, of the 71st FS, 1st FW, crashed near Dhahran, Saudi Arabia. Pilot ejected and survived.
- 15 March 1993: F-15C, 79-0027, c/n 0560/C096, of the 95th FS, crashed into the Gulf of Mexico south of Tyndall AFB, Florida. Pilot ejected and survived.
- 12 June 1993: F-15A, 77-0117, of the 122nd FS, Louisiana ANG, crashed near NAS New Orleans, Louisiana. Pilot ejected and survived.
- 17 December 1993: F-15A, 75-0054, of the 122nd FS, 159th FG, Louisiana ANG, crashed into the Atlantic Ocean off Brunswick, Georgia after colliding with F-16A 82-0927. F-16A pilot was killed, F-15A pilot ejected and survived.
- 4 April 1994: F-15C, 78-0497, of the 44th FS, crashed on takeoff from Kadena AB, Okinawa. Pilot ejected and survived.
- 5 May 1994: F-15C, 79-0058, of the 1st FS, 325th FS, crashed into the Gulf of Mexico while based out of Tyndall AFB. Pilot ejected at 745 miles per hour (1,199 km/h) and survived with serious injuries.
- 6 May 1994: F-15C, 78-0530, of the 67th FS, crashed in the Yellow Sea, off Boryeong, South Korea, after colliding with F-16C 87-0274. F-16C pilot ejected and survived, F-15C pilot was missing and presumed dead.
- 18 April 1995: F-15E-48-MC, 89-0504, c/n 1151/E126, of the 336th FS, 4th FW, USAF, lost during a training flight off the coast of North Carolina. The WSO, Capt Dennis White was killed during the supersonic ejection; the pilot, Capt Brian Udell survived one of the fastest known ejections in history at over 780 miles per hour (1,260 km/h) and about 3,000 feet (910 m) above the ocean.
- 30 May 1995: F-15C-26-MC, 79‑0068, c/n 0616/C137, of the 53rd FS, 52nd FW, USAF, Major Donald "Zane" Lowry was killed when his F-15C crashed at Spangdahlem AB in Germany. Investigation showed that during routine maintenance, mechanics had crossed and mis-connected the control rods. Two mechanics were charged with negligent homicide. One committed suicide during his military trial. Charges against the other mechanic were dropped. This same crossed-control rod installation had happened in USAF F-15s at least twice previously, in 1986 and 1991, but the error was caught on the ground (see 53rd FS for complete info).
- 3 August 1995: F-15C, 78-0537, of the 67th FS, crashed in the Yukon–Charley Rivers National Preserve, Alaska. Pilot ejected and survived.
- 18 October 1995: F-15C, 78-0529, of the 44th FS, crashed in the Pacific Ocean south of Kadena AB, Okinawa. Pilot ejected and survived.
- 21 March 1996: F-15C, 82-0023, 27th FS, 1st FW, crashed on takeoff at Nellis AFB during Exercise Green Flag. Pilot ejected and survived.
- 27 August 1996: F-15C, 86-0150, 390th FS, crashed south west of Mountain Home AFB, Idaho. Bearing 5 failure resulting in #2 engine catastrophic failure which liberated the turbine disc cutting #1 engine in half. Pilot ejected and survived.
- 10 January 1997: F-15C, 85-0099, of the 58th FS, 33rd FW, destroyed by fire at Eglin AFB, pilot escaped.
- 11 July 1997: F-15E, 89-0491, of the 334th FS, crashed into the Alligator River in North Carolina. Crew both ejected and survived.
- 24 November 1997: F-15C, 83-0033, of the 94th FS, 1st FW, USAF, crashed in the Atlantic Ocean off Virginia. Pilot ejected and survived.
- 5 June 1998: F-15A, 77-0120, of the 122nd FS, 159th FW, USAF, crashed on takeoff beyond the runway end at NAS New Orleans, Louisiana. Pilot ejected and survived.
- 21 October 1998: F-15E-48-MC, 89-0497, c/n 1144/E119, of the 391st FS, 366th FW, USAF, at Mountain Home, ID, was lost on a night terrain-following training sortie. Both crewmembers were killed: pilot Lt Col William "Willy" aka "Skunk" Morel and WSO, Capt Jeff "Flounder" Fahnlander.
- 28 January 1999: F-15C, 82-0020, of the 85th TES, 53rd WG, USAF, crashed into the Gulf of Mexico near Eglin AFB after colliding with F-15C 84-0011. Pilot ejected and survived.
- 28 January 1999: F-15C, 84-0011, of the 85th TES, 53rd WG, USAF, crashed into the Gulf of Mexico near Eglin AFB after colliding with F-15C 82-0020. Pilot ejected and survived.
- 15 or 19 June 1999: F-15C, 82-0008, of the 422nd TES, 57th FWW, USAF, crashed at Nellis AFB after colliding with F-15D 79-0013. Pilot ejected and survived.
- 15 or 19 June 1999: F-15D, 79-0013, of the 445 FLTS, 412th TW, USAF, crashed at Nellis AFB after colliding with F-15C 82-0008. Pilot ejected and survived, apparently only one crewmember on board the two seat F-15D.
- 19 August 1999: F-15A, 76-0117, of the 110th FS, 131st FW, MO ANG, crashed near Lindbergh, Missouri after colliding with F-15A 76-0118. Pilot ejected and survived, the other F-15A landed safely at St. Louis-Lambert.

==== 2000s ====
- 26 March 2001: F-15C-42-MC, 86-0169, c/n 1018/C397, of the 493d FS, 48th FW, USAF, two US Air Force F-15Cs crashed near the summit of Ben Macdui in the Cairngorms during a low flying training exercise over the Scottish Highlands with low visibility. Lieutenant Colonel Kenneth John Hyvonen died in the accident as did Captain Kirk Jones in the second F-15. USAF investigators cited a breakdown in terrain avoidance responsibilities between the pilots and ground controllers. In 2003, an RAF air traffic controller was found not guilty during a court martial. In 2006, the RAF Board of Inquiry stated that the pilots were partly responsible for accepting a clearly unsafe air traffic control instruction.
- 26 March 2001: F-15C-42-MC, 86-0180, c/n 1033/C408, of the 493d FS, 48th FW, USAF, in formation with 86-0169 above, crashed near the summit of Ben Macdui in the Cairngorms. Captain Kirk Jones died in the accident.

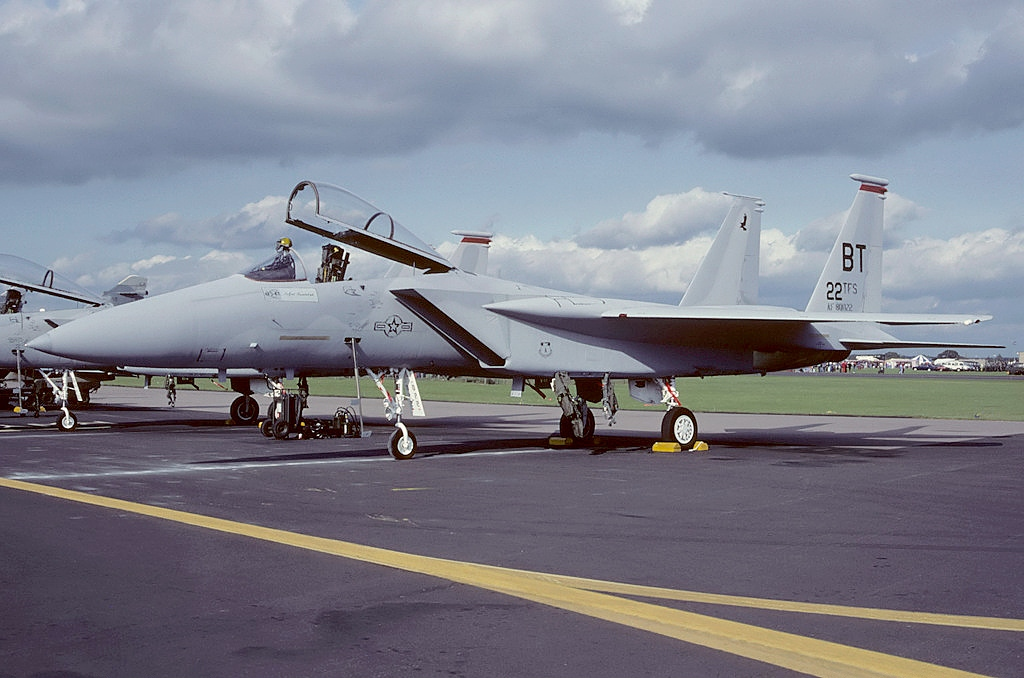
F-15C Eagle 80–0022 on 26 May 1991. It crashed on 30 April 2002.

- 30 April 2002: F-15C-27-MC, 80-0022, c/n 0665/C171, of the 46th Test Wing, based at Eglin Air Force Base, Florida, crashed in the Gulf of Mexico approximately 60 miles south of Panama City, Florida, killing test pilot Maj. James A. Duricy, assigned to the 40th Test Squadron, 46th Test Wing. An Accident Investigation Board determined that the crash was caused by the structural failure of the honeycomb material supporting the leading edge of the port vertical stabilizer during a high-speed test dive. A section of the leading edge, approximately 6 × 3 feet, broke away.
- 21 August 2002: F-15C, 78-0541, of the 18th FW, crashed into the Pacific Ocean near Kadena AB, Okinawa. Pilot ejected and survived.
- 17 March 2003: F-15C, 80-0030, of the 422d TES, 53d WG, crashed after colliding with F-15C 83-0040. Pilot ejected and survived, the second F-15C landed safely at Nellis AFB.
- 7 April 2003: F-15E-46-MC, 88-1694, c/n 1103/E078, of the 335th FS, 4th FW, USAF, crashed during a combat bombing mission near Tikrit, Iraq during the U.S. invasion of Iraq. Both the pilot, Capt. Eric Das of Amarillo, Texas and Weapon Systems Officer (WSO), Major William R. Watkins III of South Boston, VA were killed. From the investigation of the crash site neither man tried to eject, and the aircraft was destroyed in the crash.
- 4 June 2003: F-15E-43-MC, 87-0186, c/n 1051/E026, of the 334th FS, 4th FW, USAF, crashed in an unpopulated wooded area of Johnston County near Four Oaks, North Carolina. The mishap crew ejected and sustained only minor injuries. The crash was due to a malfunction of the right stabilator which caused the aircraft to go into an unrecoverable spin.
- 6 May 2004: F-15E-46-MC, 88-1701, c/n 1110/E085, of the 335th FS, 4th FW, USAF, out of Seymour Johnson AFB crashed near a rural area outside of Roanoke, VA during a low-level training mission. The two pilots parachuted to safety and reported only minor injuries.
- 21 May 2004: F-15C, 81-0027, of the 325th FW, crashed along the shore of St. George Island in the Gulf of Mexico after pilot accidentally pulled the ejection handle. Pilot survived.
- 18 June 2004: F-15C, 79-0054, of the 57th WG, crashed near Nellis AFB, Nevada. Pilot ejected and survived.
- 25 March 2005: F-15C, 80-0052, of the 53d WG, crashed at Nellis AFB. Pilot ejected and survived.
- 17 January 2006: F-15, 78-0498, of the 44th FS, 18th FW, USAF, crashed into the Pacific Ocean near Kadena AB, Okinawa. Pilot ejected and survived.
- 30 May 2007: F-15D, 78-0571, of the 131st FW, Missouri ANG, crashed 8 miles south of Vincennes, Indiana. Pilot ejected and survived, no second crewmember aboard.
- 11 June 2007: F-15C, 83-0017, of the 71st FS, 1st FW, crashed west of Eielson AFB, Alaska after colliding with F-16C 86-0269 during Red Flag exercise. Pilot ejected and survived. The F-16C was damaged but landed safely.
- 26 June 2007: F-15A, 75-0040 of the 123d FS, 142d FW, Oregon ANG, crashed into the Pacific Ocean west of Arch Cape, Oregon. Pilot was killed and apparently did not eject.
- 2 November 2007: F-15C-28-MC, 80-0034, c/n 0687/C183, of the 131st Fighter Wing, Missouri Air National Guard, crashed during air combat maneuvering training near St. Louis, Missouri. The pilot, Maj. Stephen W. Stilwell, ejected but suffered serious injuries. The crash was the result of an in-flight breakup due to structural failure. On 3 November 2007, all non-mission critical models of the F-15 were grounded pending the outcome of the crash investigation, and on the following day, grounded non-mission critical F-15s engaged in combat missions in the Middle East. By 13 November 2007 over 1,100 were grounded worldwide after Israel, Japan and Saudi Arabia grounded their aircraft as well. F-15Es were cleared on 15 November 2007 pending aircraft passing inspections. On 8 January 2008, the USAF cleared 60 percent of the F-15A-D fleet for return to flight. On 10 January 2008, the accident review board released its report stating the 2 November crash was related to the longeron not meeting drawing specifications. The Air Force cleared all its grounded F-15A-D fighters for flight on 15 February 2008 pending inspections, reviews and any needed repairs. In March 2008, Stilwell, the injured pilot, filed a lawsuit against Boeing, the F-15's manufacturer.
- 1 February 2008: F-15D, 78-0562, of the 154th Wing, Hawaii ANG, crashed in the Pacific Ocean near Hickam AFB, Hawaii. Pilot ejected and survived.
- 20 February 2008: F-15C-26-MC, 79-0075, c/n 0624/C144, of the 58th FS, 33d FW, USAF, Eglin AFB, Florida, one of two F-15C Eagles that collided over the Gulf of Mexico approximately 50 miles south of Tyndall AFB, Florida, killing 1st Lt. Ali Jivanjee. Capt. Tucker Hamilton ejected from the other fighter and survived. Both pilots ejected and one was rescued from the Gulf by the fishing boat Niña, owned by Bart Niquet of Lynn Haven, Florida, which was guided to the pilot by an HC-144A Ocean Sentry aircraft. A 1st SOW AC-130H and an MV-22 Osprey were also diverted to the scene to help search as were five Coast Guard aircraft and two vessels. An HH-60J Jayhawk from Coast Guard Aviation Training Center, Mobile, Alabama lifted the pilot from the fishing boat and evacuated him to the Eglin Hospital. The second pilot was rescued from the Gulf by an HH-60J Jayhawk from CGAS Clearwater and also taken to the Eglin Hospital. One pilot subsequently died several hours later from his injuries. An accident investigation released 25 August 2008 found that the accident was the result of pilot error and not mechanical failure. Both pilots failed to clear their flight paths and anticipate their impending high-aspect, midair impact, according to Brig. Gen. Joseph Reynes Jr., Air Combat Command's inspector general who led the investigation.
- 20 February 2008: F-15C-32-MC, 81-0043, c/n 0793/C226, of the 58th FS, 33d FW, USAF, Eglin AFB, Florida, one of two F-15C Eagles that collided over the Gulf of Mexico as above.
- 30 July 2008: F-15D-39-MC, 85-0131, c/n 0957/D057, of the 65th Aggressor Squadron, 57th ATG, at Nellis Air Force Base, departed controlled flight and entered into a spin while executing a planned maneuver during exercise Red Flag 08–3. The aircraft was destroyed after impacting the ground 20 miles northwest of Rachel, Nevada in an uninhabited area on the Nevada Test and Training Range (NTTR) belonging to the Bureau of Land Management. Both aircrew ejected. The back seat observer pilot sustained minor injuries and was rescued; the front seat pilot hit the ground before his parachute fully deployed and died upon ground impact. There were no civilian casualties or additional damage.
- 18 July 2009: F-15E-49-MC, 90-0231, c/n 1160/E133, of the 336th FS, 4th FW, USAF, crashed in central Afghanistan, killing the two crew members.

==== 2010s ====
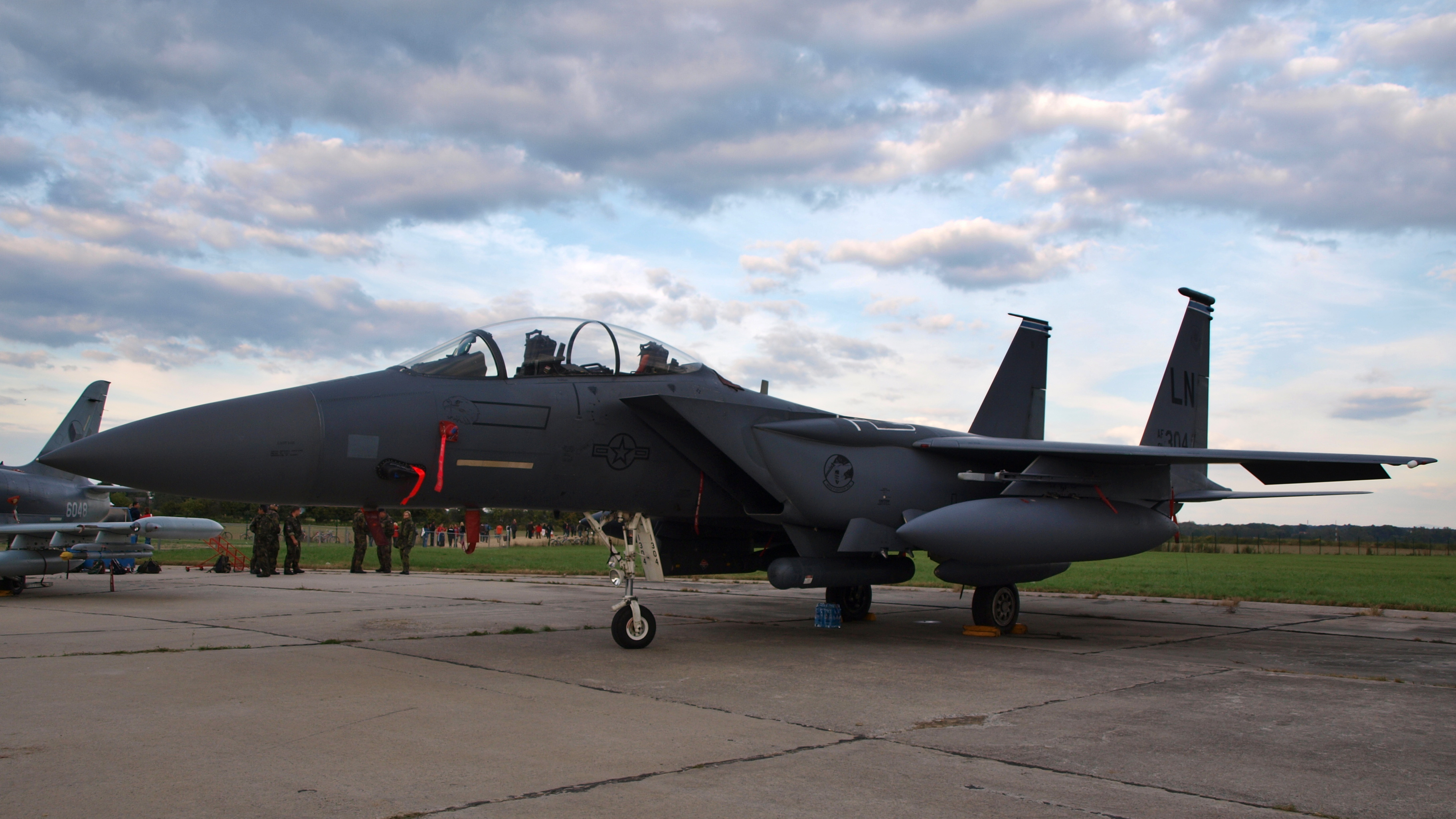
Aircraft F-15E '91-0304/LN', 48th Fighter Wing, at Dny NATO in Ostrava, Czech Republic on 18 September 2010; it crashed on 22 March 2011 in Libya.

- 22 March 2011: F-15E-51-MC, 91-0304, c/n 1211/E169, of the 492nd FS "Bolars", 48th FW, USAF, from RAF Lakenheath crashed near Benghazi, Libya in Operation Odyssey Dawn. Both crewmen ejected safely and were recovered by friendly forces. Equipment problems with weapons interface software and the right external fuel tank led to a strong right-wing weight imbalance, which caused the aircraft to enter a flat spin during a low-speed, high altitude, 100-degree bank-angle right turn. The mishap investigation board found the cause of the crash to be lack of published knowledge on F-15E maneuvering with large external store weight imbalances at high altitude.
- 24 October 2011: F-15C-29-MC, 80-0041, c/n 0704/C190, of the 422nd Test and Evaluation Squadron at Nellis Air Force Base crashed near Alamo, Nevada. The pilot ejected and was picked up by an Air Force helicopter a half hour later. No injuries were reported. The resulting USAF investigation attributed the crash to six contributing factors, including a problem with the plane's radome and the pilot's subsequent actions.
- 28 March 2012: F-15E-49-MC, 90-0235, c/n 1165/E137, of the 391st EFS, 366th FW, USAF, deployed from Mountain Home AFB, Idaho, crashed due to an accident approximately 15 miles outside a base in Southwest Asia. The pilot, Capt. Francis D. "Piston" Imlay, 31, of Vacaville, California died from his injuries. The WSO suffered minor injuries only.
- 3 May 2012: F-15E-50-MC, 90-0254, c/n 1191/E156, of the 391st EFS, 366th FW, USAF, deployed from Mountain Home AFB, Idaho, crashed on a "routine training flight" in Southwest Asia. Both crew members ejected safely and no one on the ground was injured. An investigation found that, for unknown reasons, titanium components in the right engine had ignited, resulting in complete loss of aircraft hydraulics and electrical power, which made the aircraft unflyable.
- 27 May 2013: F-15C-24-MC, 79-0025, c/n 0557/C094, of the 44th FS, 18th FW, USAF, crashed off the southern Japan island of Okinawa after the aircraft developed problems in flight. The pilot ejected and was recovered safely. The F-15, flying out of Kadena Air Base, went down in the Pacific about 70 miles east of Okinawa.
- 27 August 2014: F-15C-41-MC, 86-0157, c/n 1004/C385, of the 104th FW, Massachusetts Air National Guard, crashed near Deerfield, VA. The jet went down shortly after 9 AM south east of Deerfield. The jet was en route to Louisiana from Westfield, Massachusetts. Investigation at the scene of the crash show that the pilot never ejected.

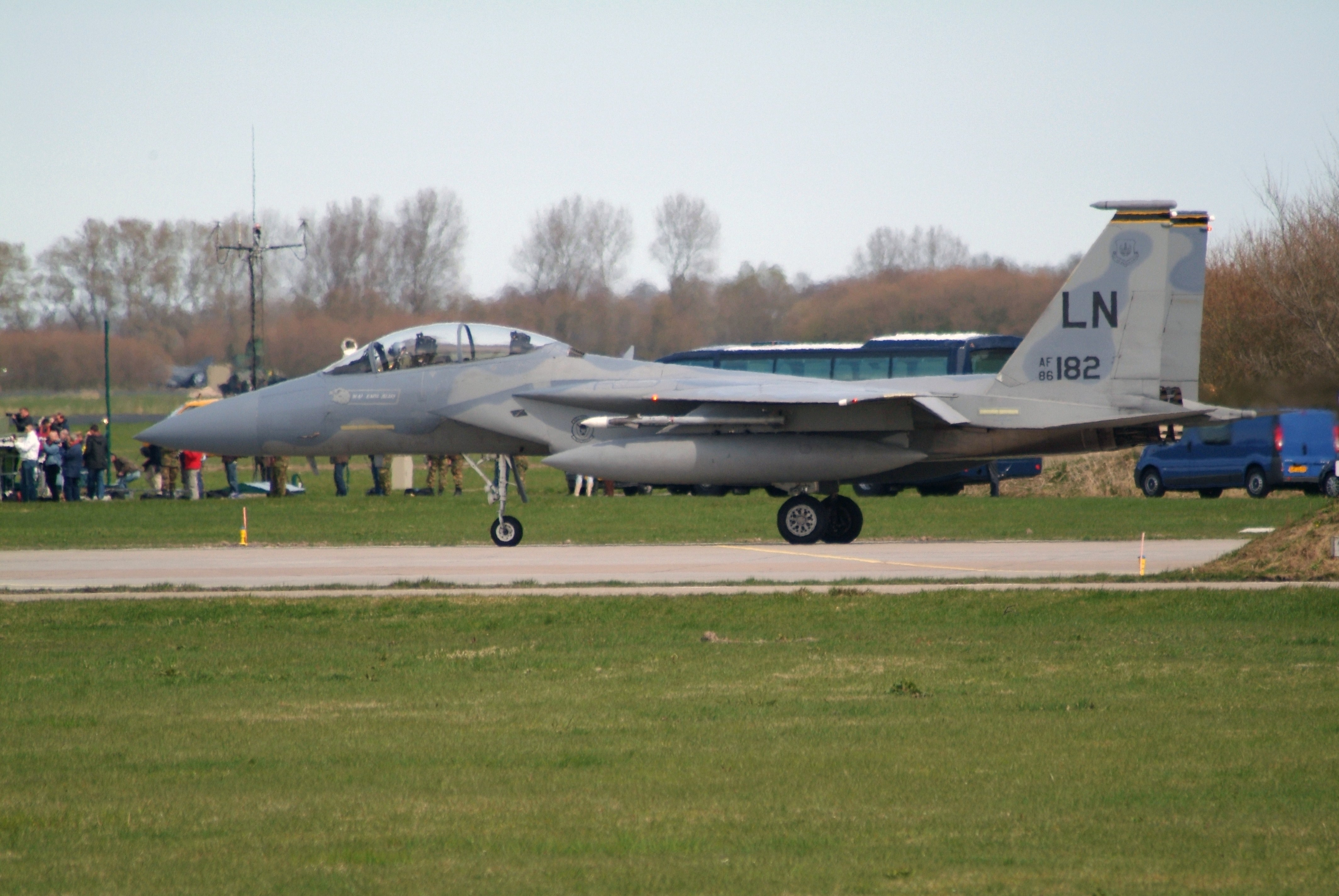
F-15D 86–0182 on 13 April 2010; it crashed in October 2014.

- 8 October 2014: F-15D-41-MC, 86-0182, c/n 0994/D062, of the 48th FW, USAF, based at RAF Lakenheath in Suffolk, crashed in a field close to a school near Weston Hills, Lincolnshire, UK. The pilot safely ejected. No one on the ground was injured. The cause of the crash was attributed to imperfections in the assembly of the nose cap which caused an uneven aerodynamic surface and the pilot carrying out a maneuver which was an "inappropriate response to conditions".
- 10 June 2018: F-15C 84-008 of the 44th Fighter Squadron at Kadena Air Base crashed into the ocean south of Okinawa. The pilot ejected and was recovered by Japanese rescue forces.

==== 2020s ====
- 15 June 2020: A USAF F-15C, 86–0176, of the 48th Fighter Wing based in RAF Lakenheath, crashed in the North Sea off of the Yorkshire Coast while on a training mission. Pilot Kenneth "Kage" Allen died in the accident. The cause of the crash was attributed to pilot error in a reduced visibility scenario.
- 2 March 2026: Three USAF F-15E were shot down by a Kuwaiti F/A-18C Hornet in a friendly fire incident over Kuwaiti airspace during Operation Epic Fury in 2026 Iran war. Their crews survived.
- 3 April 2026: One USAF F-15E was shot down by Iranian forces over Iranian airspace. Both the pilot and Weapon Systems Officer (WSO) ejected from the aircraft inside Iranian territory. The pilot was rescued on 3 April 2026. After heavy fighting on 5 April 2026, the WSO from the F-15E was successfully recovered by U.S. special operations forces in a combat search and rescue operation, in which two HH-60W Jolly Green II helicopters were reportedly damaged by incoming fire, injuring several troops.
- 9 September : 2026 - Around 8 USAF McDonnell Douglas F-15E Strike Eagle fighter planes sustained minor damage in the same attack. attack aircraft was hit and lost a wing following Iranian missile attacks on Muwaffaq Salti Air Base in Jordan.

=== Israel ===
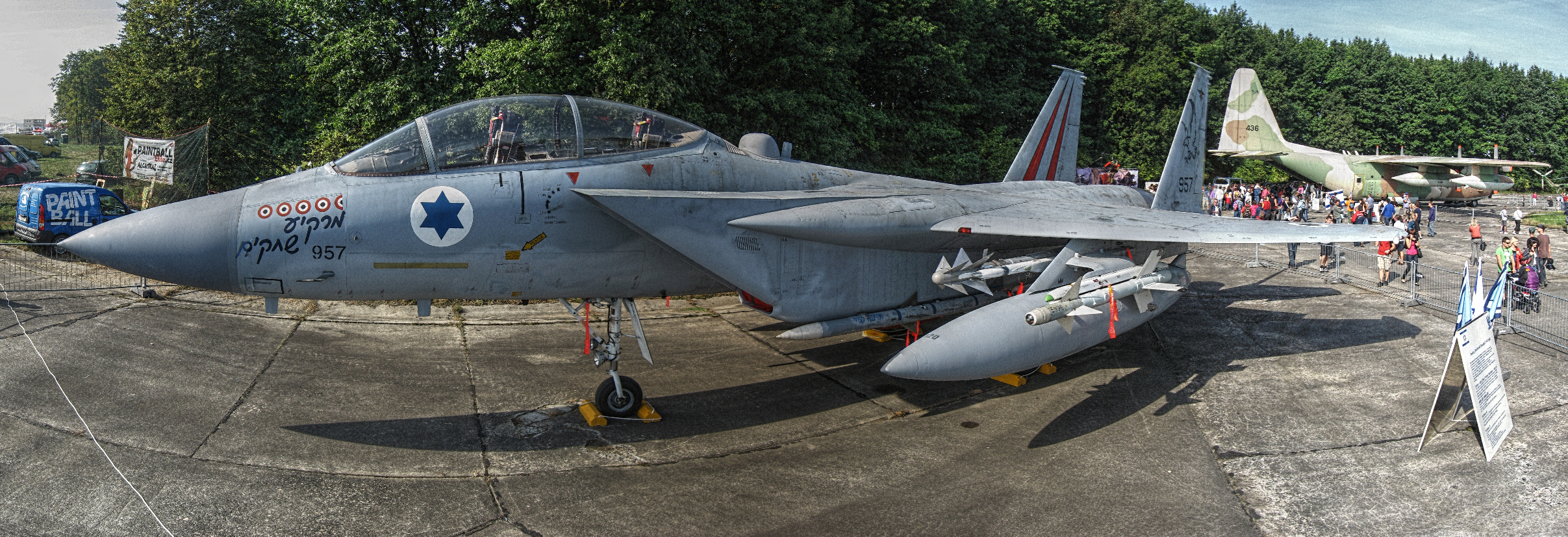
The F-15D involved in the 1983 Negev mid-air collision on 1 May.

- 29 September 1979: 133 Squadron F-15A 676 was lost in a landing accident. Pilot Guy Golan was killed.
- 1 May 1983: during an Israeli Air Force training dogfight, 106 Squadron F-15D 957 Markia Schakim (Sky soarer) collided with an A-4 Skyhawk. Unknown to pilot Zivi Nedivi and his copilot, the right wing of the Eagle was sheared off roughly two feet (60 cm) from the fuselage. The F-15 entered a controllable spin after the collision. Zivi decided to attempt recovery and engaged afterburner to increase speed, allowing him to regain control of the aircraft. The pilot was able to prevent stalling and maintain control because of the lift generated by the large horizontal surface area of the fuselage, the stabilators and remaining wing areas. The F-15 landed at twice the normal speed to maintain the necessary lift, and its tailhook was torn off completely during the landing during a failed attempt at using the emergency arresting gear installed on the runway to bring the aircraft to a halt. Zivi managed to bring his F-15 to a complete stop approximately 20 ft (6 m) from the end of the runway. He was later quoted as saying "(I) probably would have ejected if I knew what had happened." The A-4 was destroyed in the collision.
- 1 April 1987: 106 Squadron F-15D 223 HaNamer HaMeofef (Flying Leopard), the lead aircraft of Operation Wooden Leg, crashed following a low speed flat spin. Pilot Yiftach Mor was killed, while navigator Ofer Paz ejected successfully.
- 25 August 1988: F-15A 672 Tornado collided with F-15A 684 HaArpad (The Vampire), killing both pilots, 133 Squadron commander Ram Caller and pilot Ehud Falk.
- 10 February 1991: 106 Squadron F-15C 821 Peres (Bearded vulture), 80–0130, crashed during a training sortie. Pilot Israel Ornan ejected but drowned.
- 10 August 1995: 106 Squadron F-15D 965, 80–0134, suffered a birdstrike. Ronen Lev and Yaron Vayonte are killed.
- 19 January 1997: 106 Squadron F-15B 137 crashed, crew Kfir and Yuval were recovered.
- 1 March 1998: F-15B 142 Keren Or (Ray of Light), 73–0112, crashed during a strike training mission near Nablus. 106 Squadron junior deputy commander Uri Kolton and navigator Uri Manor were killed when the aircraft hit an antenna on top of a mountain obscured by clouds.

=== Japan ===
The Japan Air Self-Defense Force (JASDF) lost ten Mitsubishi F-15J/DJ aircraft from 1983 to 2011.

- 20 October 1983: F-15DJ, 12-8053, of the 202nd Tactical Fighter Squadron, crashed, both crew killed.
- 13 March 1987: F-15J, 42-8840, of the 204th Tactical Fighter Squadron, crashed, pilot killed.
- 29 June 1988: F-15J, 22-8804, of the 303rd Tactical Fighter Squadron, collided with JASDF F-15J, 22–8808, pilot killed.
- 2 July 1990: F-15J, 52-8857, of the 204th Tactical Fighter Squadron, crashed, pilot killed.
- 13 December 1991: F-15DJ, 12-8079, of the 201st Tactical Fighter Squadron, crashed, pilot injured after low altitude ejection.
- 27 October 1992: F-15J, 72-8884, of the 204th Tactical Fighter Squadron, crashed, pilot ejected but died later.
- 6 October 1993: F-15DJ, 82-8064, of the 202nd Tactical Fighter Squadron, crashed, both crew ejected and rescued.
- 22 November 1995: F-15J, 52-8846, of the 303rd Tactical Fighter Squadron, Komatsu AFB, JASDF, during air-intercept training over the Sea of Japan, flown by Lt. Tatsumi Higuchi was shot down by an AIM-9L Sidewinder missile accidentally fired by his wingman. The pilot ejected safely. A similar friendly fire incident had happened five years earlier, on 19 Mar 1990. A USAF F-15 flown by LtC Jimmy L. Harris was hit by a Sidewinder launched by his wingman, 1Lt Michael Lynch, in the skies of Alaska. This incident does not appear here in this list of losses, because Harris was able to limp his severely damaged jet (photo) back for a safe landing.
- 5 July 2011: F-15J, 72-8879, of the 204th Tactical Fighter Squadron, During a training flight the F-15J crashed in the East China Sea about 180 kilometres (110 miles) northwest of Naha city on Okinawa island. The aircraft's speed brake and part of a wing were found about an hour later. The pilot, Major Yuji Kawakubo, was not found and is presumed dead.
- 18 August 2026: Japan Self Defense Force F-15's landing gear broken became immobilized following landing at the Naha International Airport at Naha City, Okinawa Prefecture.

=== South Korea ===
- 7 June 2006: F-15K, ROKAF, crashed off the coast of Pohang, North Gyeongsang Province, South Korea, during a nighttime intercept training mission, killing both crew members. The Republic of Korea Air Force commissioned a full investigation. The ROKAF later issued a public statement saying that the accident was apparently caused by both crew members entering a state of g-LOC that lasted 16 seconds and resulted in loss of control of the aircraft. Subsequent public outcry ensued with accusations of a cover-up because the blackbox was never recovered, and F-15Ks are equipped with automatic GLC (G Limited Control anti g-LOC device) systems. In addition the crew members were both seasoned Air Force veterans and the claim that both lost consciousness simultaneously was questioned in the press. (However, ROKAF reported that F-15K models do not have automatic GLC as other F-15 variants.)
- 5 April 2018: F-15K Slam Eagle crashed in the Yuhak mountain range in Chilgok, North Gyeongsang, on its way back to the Daegu Air Base after an hour-long mission. Two F-15K pilots killed in plane crash.

=== Saudi Arabia ===
- May 1982: F-15C, s/n 1308, 12 Squadron
- 1 September 1986: F-15C, s/n 611, 6 Squadron, collision with RSAF F-15C 610.
- 30 August 1988: F-15C, 5 Squadron, crashed near Al Hesa, Saudi Arabia.
- 3 July 1996: F-15C, collision with RSAF F-15C, eastern Saudi Arabia, pilot killed.
- 23 May 2000: F-15C, crash at night east of Riyadh, pilot killed.
- 23 May 2011: F-15, Royal Saudi Air Force (RSAF), crashed during a training flight in eastern Saudi Arabia from King Abdulaziz Air Base, killing the pilot.
- 26 March 2015: F-15S, RSAF, crashed in the Gulf of Aden during a mission in Yemen. The two crew members ejected and were rescued by a US Armed Forces HH-60 from Djibouti 26 March 2015 at around 2120 UTC, two hours after making a request for assistance.
- 26 July 2023: F-15SA, RSAF, crashed during a training mission in Khamis Mushait at King Khalid Air Base, killing the crew.
- 7 December 2023: F-15SA, RSAF, crashed during a training mission in King Abdulaziz Air Base killing its two crew members on board.
- 16 September 2026: F-15SA, RSAF, tail number 5529, reportedly shot down by the Houthis over Marib governorate, the status of the crew remains unverified.
