= Naha Air Base =

Naha Air Base

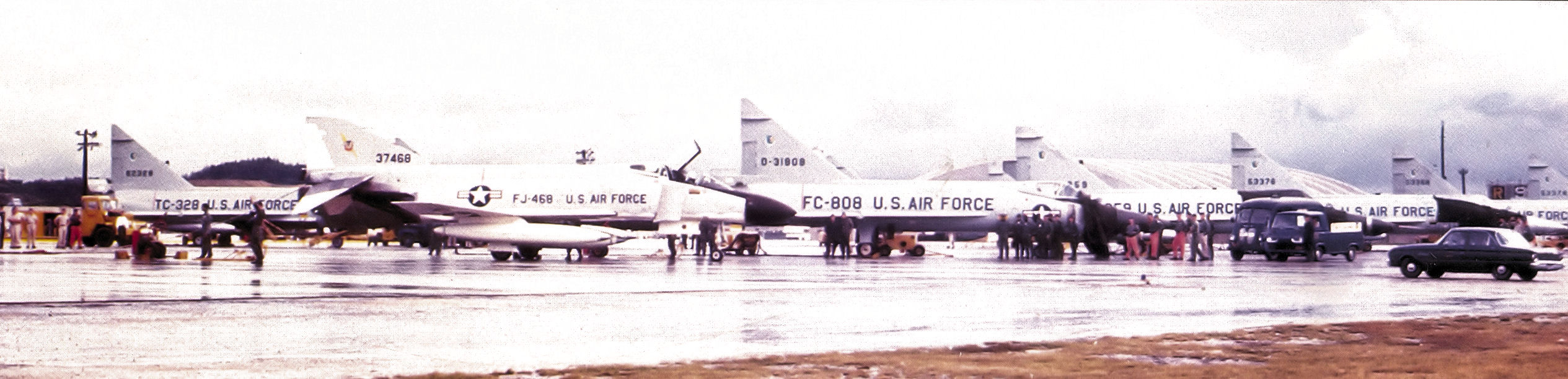
- PACAF 16th Fighter-Interceptor Squadron F-102 interceptors on the flight line, 1966
- IATA: OKA; ICAO: ROAH

Summary
- Airport type: Military
- Serves: Naha, Okinawa, Japan
- Elevation AMSL: 11 ft / 3 m
- Coordinates: 26°11′45″N 127°38′45″E

Map
- Location in Japan

Runways
Direction	Length		Surface
Direction	m	ft	Surface
18L/36R	3,000	9,843	Asphalt
- Source: Japanese AIP at AIS Japan

Naha Air Base (那覇基地, Naha Kichi), formally known as the Kōkū Jieitai Naha Kichi (航空自衛隊那覇基地), is an air base of the Japan Air Self-Defense Force formerly under control of the United States Air Force. It is located at Naha Airport on the Oroku Peninsula in Naha, Okinawa, Japan.

== History ==
=== Imperial Period ===
Naha Airfield was constructed in 1933 as Oroku Naval Air Base, an air base of the Imperial Japanese Navy (IJN). In 1936 control of the air base was transferred to the Japanese Ministry of Communications and formally renamed Naha Airfield. In 1942 control of the air base again reverted to the IJN, which reverted the name of the installation to Oroku Naval Air Base. The facility was captured by the United States during World War II in the Battle of Okinawa on 1 April 1945.

=== US period ===
After World War II the installation became a major United States Air Force (USAF) base, known as Naha Air Base (Naha AB).

It appears that the 22 Air Depot arrived at Naha on 16 August 1945, under the control of the VIII Air Force Service Command. It was transferred to the Okinawa Air Depot, by October 1945; the IV Air Service Area Command, whose headquarters may have been at Sacramento, January 1946; and the Okinawa Air Materiel Area on 31 July 1946. It was inactivated on 20 February 1947. Decades later, it was technically disbanded on paper in 1984, then reconstituted under a different name at RAF Fairford in 2005.

The base fell under Far East Air Forces from 1947 and then Pacific Air Forces (PACAF) from 1957. It became a joint military-civilian air field in 1954 with the resumption of civilian air service between Tokyo and Okinawa. The USAF ended its use of Naha AB on 31 May 1971 and control of civil aviation was transferred to the Japanese Ministry of Transportation, which established Naha Airport on the site; control of the military air field was officially transferred to the Japan Air Self-Defense Force in 1979.

=== Post-US period ===
Japanese F-15s have been stationed there, with a second squadron of F-15s added in 2014.

== Former USAF units ==
Major USAF units assigned to Naha AB were:

- Headquarters, 301st Fighter Wing, 12 May 1947 – 20 January 1949
- 51st Fighter Group, 22 May 1947 – 22 September 1950

16th Fighter Squadron, 22 May 1947 – 22 September 1950 (F-80 Shooting Star)
25th Fighter Squadron, 22 May 1947 – 22 September 1950 (F-80 Shooting Star)
26th Fighter Squadron, 22 May 1947 – 22 September 1950 (F-80 Shooting Star)

- 4th Fighter (All-Weather) Squadron, 19 August 1948 – 16 February 1953 (P-61 Black Widow, F-82 Twin Mustang)

Assigned to: 347th Fighter (later Fighter-All Weather) Group, Kadena Air Base, Okinawa

Attached to: 51st Fighter (later Fighter-Interceptor) Group), 19 August 1948

Assigned to: Twentieth Air Force, 24 June 1950

Attached to: 51st Fighter-Interceptor Wing, 24 June 1950

Flight of 8 aircraft attached to 347th Provisional Fighter Group (All Weather), Itazuke Air Base, Japan, 27 June – 5 July 1950 for combat missions in Korea

Attached to: 6302d Air Base Group, 20 September 1950
Attached to: 6351st Air Base Wing, 25 June 1951–16 February 1953

- Redesignated: 4th Fighter-Interceptor Squadron (F-94 Starfire)

Assigned to: 6351st Air Base Wing, 25 February-1 August 1954

- 6351st Air Base Wing, 22 September 1950 – 1 August 1954
- 51st Fighter-Interceptor Wing, 1 August 1954 – 31 May 1971

16th Fighter-Interceptor Squadron, 1 August 1954 – 31 May 1971, (F-86 Sabre, F-102 Delta Dagger)
25th Fighter-Interceptor Squadron, 1 August 1954 – 8 June 1960, (F-86 Sabre)
26th Fighter-Interceptor Squadron, 1 August 1954 – 11 July 1955, (F-86 Sabre)

- 623rd Aircraft Control & Warning Squadron, 20 December 1957 – 8 July 1973

Assigned to: 313th Air Division, 15 March 1955 – 17 July 1960

Attached to: 51st Fighter-Interceptor Wing, 27 March 1958 – 17 July 1960

Assigned to: 51st Fighter-Interceptor Wing, 18 July 1960 – 20 May 1971
Assigned to: 18th Tactical Fighter Wing, 21 May 1971 – 8 July 1973

- 21st Troop Carrier (Tactical Airlift) Squadron 15 November 1958 – 31 May 1971, (C-119 Flying Boxcar, C-130 Hercules)

Assigned to: 483rd Troop Carrier Wing (1958–1960); 315th Air Division (1960–1963) 6315th Operations Group (1963–1966); 374th Tactical Airlift Wing (1966–1971)

- 35th Troop Carrier Squadron (315th Air Division), 8 January 1963 – 8 August 1966, (C-130 Hercules)
- 817th Troop Carrier Squadron (315th Air Division), 25 June 1960 – 8 August 1966, (C-130 Hercules)

== Current SDF units ==
Japan Air Self-Defense Force

- 9th Air Wing
  - 204th Tactical Fighter Squadron (F-15J/DJ)(Kawasaki T-4)
  - 304th Tactical Fighter Squadron (F-15J/DJ)(Kawasaki T-4)
  - Southwestern Air Command Support Flight (Kawasaki T-4)
- 603rd Squadron (E-2C)
- Air Rescue Wing
  - Naha Helicopter Airlift Squadron (CH-47J)

Japan Ground Self-Defense Force

- 15th Brigade
  - 15th Helicopter Squadron (LR-2)(UH-60JA)(CH-47JA)

Japan Maritime Self-Defense Force

- 5th Air Fleet Squadron (P-3C)
- Naha Base Squadron (UH-60J)

The Okinawa Prefectural Police, and the Japan Coast Guard also utilize facilities at Naha Airport.

As of 2013, funding in the region of ¥0.3 billion has been requested for preparing the base to host JASDF E-2C aircraft, including ¥70million for new repair and maintenance facilities.

== See also ==
- Naval Base Okinawa
