= 202nd Tactical Fighter Squadron (JASDF) =

- 第202飛行隊
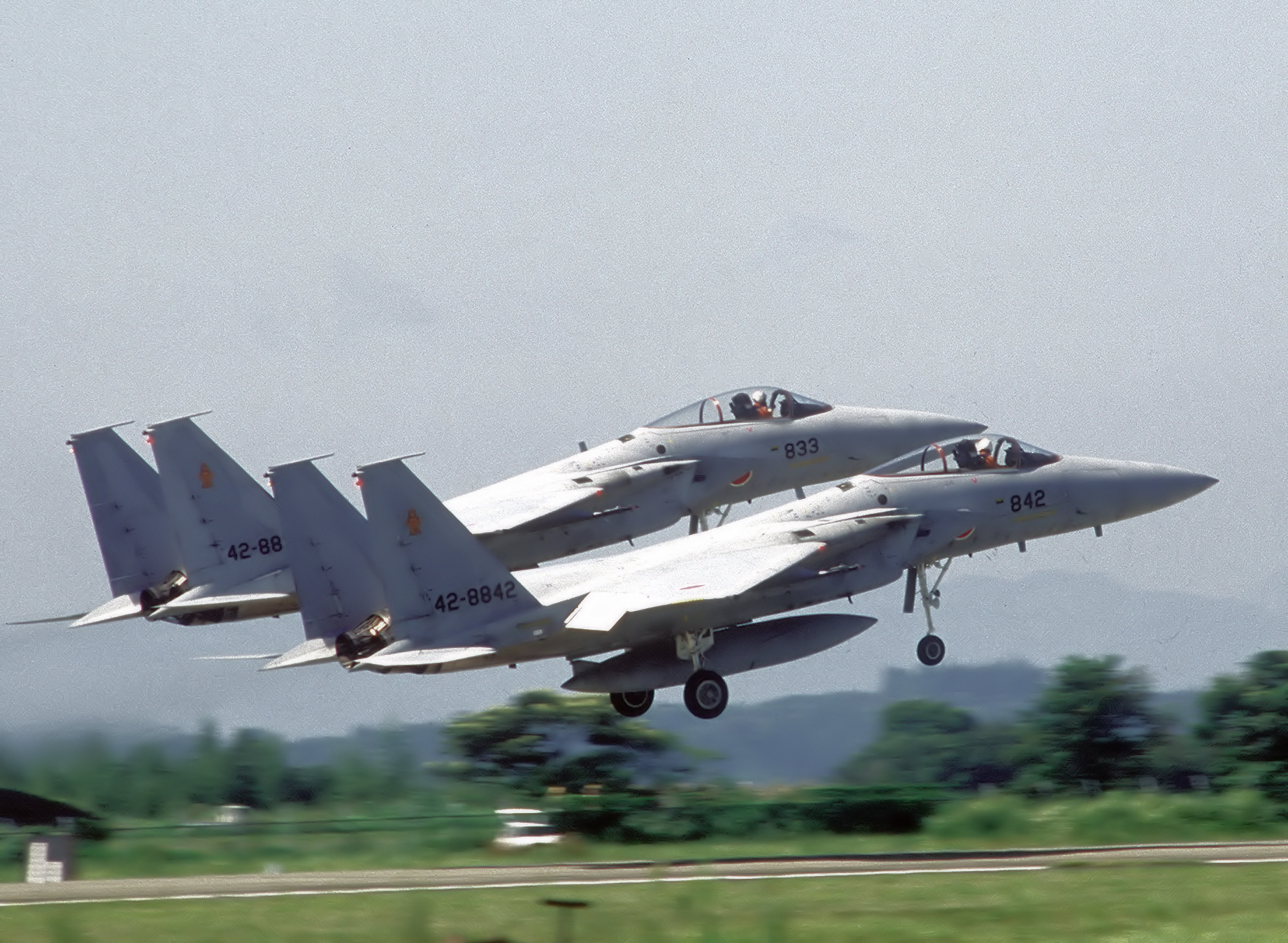
- 202 Squadron Mitsubishi F-15Js (1985)
- Active: March 31, 1964 – October 3, 2000
- Country: Japan
- Branch: Japan Air Self-Defense Force
- Part of: Western Air Defense Force, 5th Air Wing
- Garrison/HQ: Nyutabaru Air Base

Aircraft flown
- Fighter: Mitsubishi F-15J/DJ
- Trainer: Kawasaki T-4

The 202nd Tactical Fighter Squadron (第202飛行隊 (dai-ni-hyaku-ni-hikoutai)) was a squadron of the 5th Air Wing of the Japan Air Self-Defense Force from 1964 to 2000. It was based at Nyutabaru Air Base in Miyazaki Prefecture, Japan. When the squadron disbanded it was equipped with Mitsubishi F-15J/DJ and Kawasaki T-4 aircraft.

The squadron was based at Nyutabaru Air Base for almost all of its existence. Its successor squadron, the 23rd Flying Training Squadron is currently based there.

== History ==
The squadron was formed flying the Lockheed F-104J Starfighter on March 31, 1964, as part of the 5th Air Wing. From October 1, 1964 it was responsible for quick reaction alert scrambles. For a brief period (August 20, 1980 to January 31, 1981) the squadron relocated to Tsuiki Air Base in Fukuoka Prefecture. It participated in exercises including Cope North 1980.

In the early 1980s the JASDF was introducing the Mitsubishi F-15J to begin replacing the older F-104 and F-4 aircraft. On December 17, 1981 the squadron became the first in the JASDF to operate the F-15, as the "Provisional F-15J Squadron". From December 21, 1982 it was known once again as 202nd squadron. As the squadron was responsible for F-15 pilot conversion training, it had more of the double-seater F-15DJ models than other squadrons. On July 16, 1984 it again took up a quick response alert role, scrambling for the first time three days later. From 1984 to 2000 it continued to combine both the training and interceptor roles. During the F-15 era it participated in exercises including Cope North 1985-4.

It was replaced by the 23rd Flying Training Squadron, which formed immediately after the 202nd Squadron was disbanded.

== Tail markings ==
During the F-104 period the squadron's aircraft bore the Roman numeral "V", relating to the 5th Air Wing. At first these were on the engine intake and from 1968 were on the tail. During the F-15 period the squadron's aircraft had a Haniwa (warrior statue) similar to those discovered at the burial mound close to the Nyutabaru base.

== Aircraft operated ==
=== Fighter aircraft ===
- Lockheed F-104J/DJ (1964–1981)
- Mitsubishi F-15J/DJ (1981–2000)

=== Liaison aircraft ===
- Lockheed T-33A (1964–1992)
- Kawasaki T-4 (1992–2000)

== See also ==
- Fighter units of the Japan Air Self-Defense Force
