= 304th Tactical Fighter Squadron (JASDF) =

- 第304飛行隊
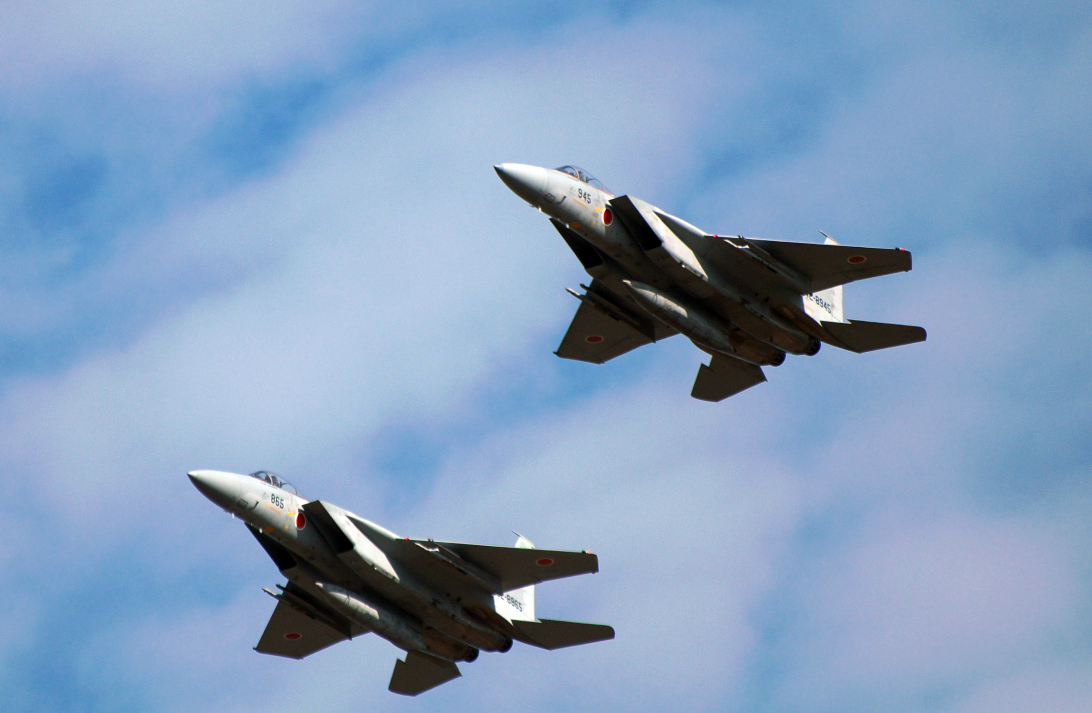
- 304 Squadron Mitsubishi F-15s (2008)
- Active: August 1, 1977
- Country: Japan
- Branch: Japan Air Self-Defense Force
- Part of: Southwestern Air Defense Force, 9th Air Wing
- Garrison/HQ: Naha Air Base

Aircraft flown
- Fighter: Mitsubishi F-15J/DJ
- Trainer: Kawasaki T-4

The 304th Tactical Fighter Squadron (第304飛行隊 (dai-sann-byaku-yon-hikoutai)) is a squadron of the 9th Air Wing of the Japan Air Self-Defense Force. It is based at Naha Air Base, in Okinawa Prefecture, Japan. It is equipped with Mitsubishi F-15J/DJ and Kawasaki T-4 aircraft.

== History ==
The squadron was founded on August 1, 1977, at Tsuiki Air Base in Fukuoka Prefecture flying the McDonnell Douglas F-4EJ. A number of the early pilots had previously flown the North American F-86F Sabre with 10th Squadron, which had just been disbanded. During this period the JASDF still followed a system in which the numbering of a squadron was dependent on the type of aircraft it operated. Single digit squadrons operated the F-86F, 100-numbered squadrons operated the F-86D, 200-numbered squadrons operated the F-104J and the new squadrons operating the F-4 were numbered in the 300s. The pilots retrained on the F-4 and from 1978 were responsible for Quick Reaction Alert duties around Fukuoka.

In January 2016, the squadron relocated to Naha Air Base in Okinawa Prefecture as part of the newly-formed 9th Air Wing.

== Tail marking ==
The squadron's aircraft bear the likeness of a tengu on their tails. Tengu are goblin-like creatures from Japanese mythology. Known for their skill with swords and possession of mystical powers, they were said to inhabit Mount Hiko in Fukuoka, located near the squadron's original base at Tsuiki.

== Aircraft operated ==
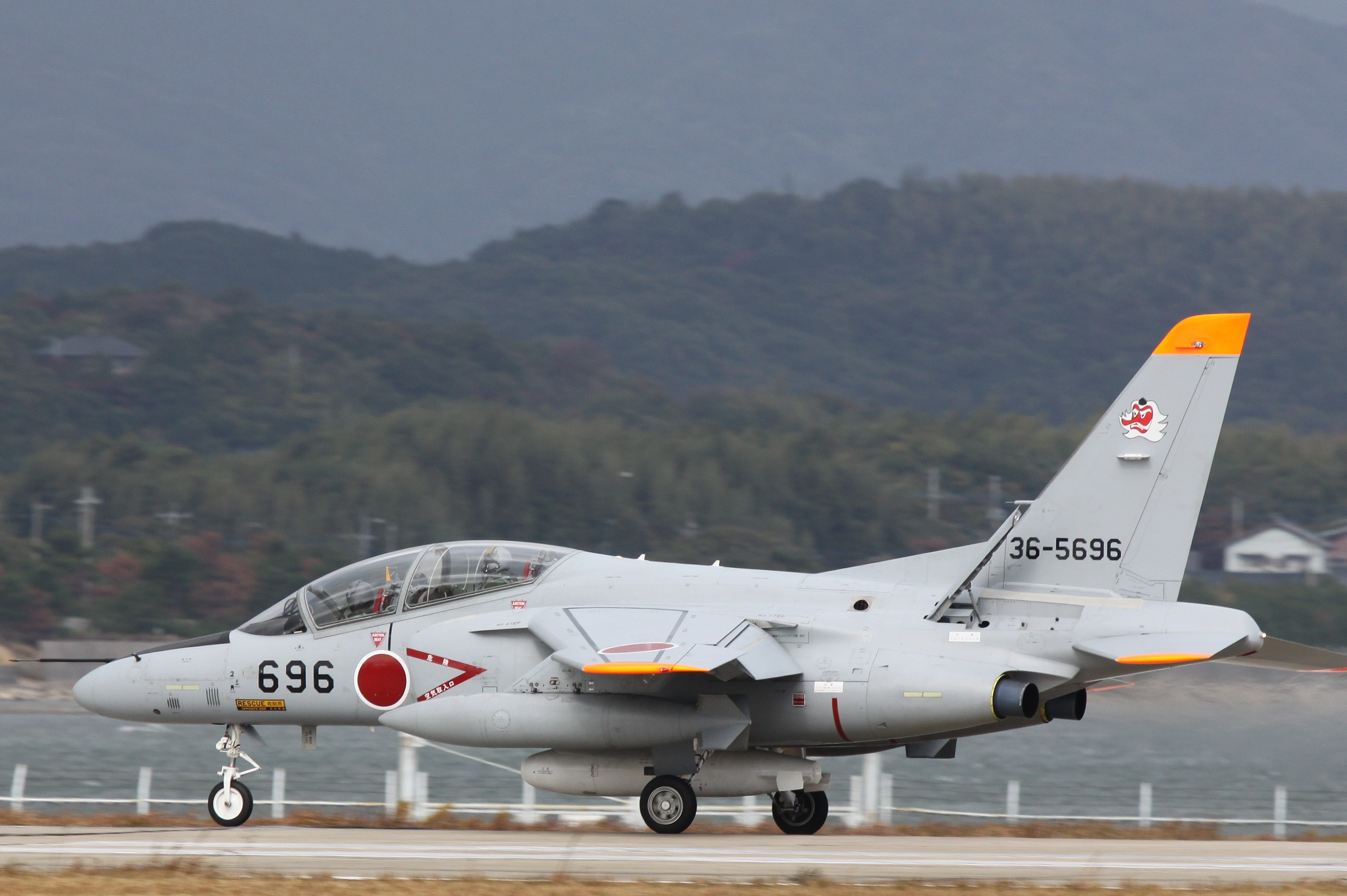
Kawasaki T-4 of 304 Sqn (2010)

=== Fighter aircraft ===
- McDonnell Douglas F-4EJ (1977–1990)
- Mitsubishi F-15J/DJ (1990–present)

=== Liaison aircraft ===
- Lockheed T-33A (1977–1993)
- Kawasaki T-4 (1991–present)

== See also ==
- Fighter units of the Japan Air Self-Defense Force
