= Mitsubishi F-15J =

Japan licensed built variant of McDonnell Douglas F-15

F-15J
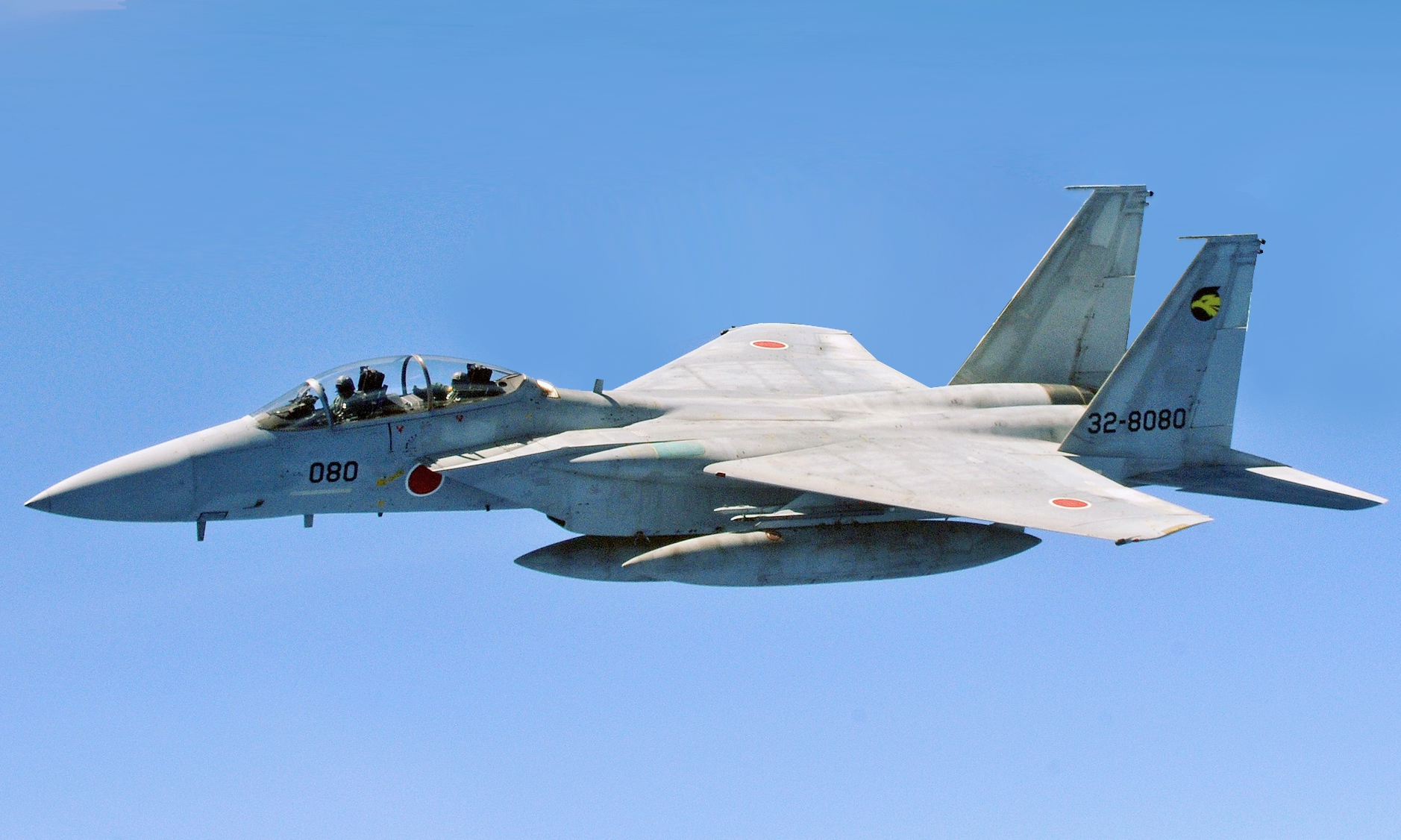
- A Japan Air Self-Defense Force F-15DJ

General information
- Type: Air superiority fighter
- National origin: Japan; United States
- Manufacturer: Mitsubishi Heavy Industries; McDonnell Douglas
- Status: In service
- Primary user: Japan Air Self-Defense Force
- Number built: 213

History
- Introduction date: 7 December 1981
- First flight: 4 June 1980
- Developed from: McDonnell Douglas F-15 Eagle

The Mitsubishi F-15J/DJ Eagle is a twin-engine, all-weather air superiority fighter based on the McDonnell Douglas F-15 Eagle in use by the Japan Air Self-Defense Force (JASDF). The F-15J was produced under license by Mitsubishi Heavy Industries along with McDonnell Douglas. The subsequent F-15DJ and F-15J Kai variants were also produced. Japan is the largest customer of the F-15 Eagle outside the United States. In addition to combat, F-15DJ roles include training.

== Development ==
In June–July 1975, the Japan Defense Agency (JDA, now Ministry of Defense) examined the McDonnell Douglas F-15 Eagle as one of the 13 candidates for the replacement of the F-104J/DJ Starfighter and F-4EJ Phantom II. A single-seat F-15A and a twin-seat F-15B were evaluated at Edwards Air Force Base, and in December 1975, the F-15 was announced the winner, with the government intending to purchase 187 F-15J/DJs. By April 1978, Mitsubishi Heavy Industries was designated as the primary contractor and licensing for the F-15C/D was achieved.

After congressional review, the Department of Defense (DoD) withheld the aircraft's electronic warfare and engine systems from the licensing. Initially, the aircraft were produced in the U.S. and exported to Japan. This initial export production contributed to aircraft development under the defense industry of Japan while facilitating base production of aircraft, achieving the goal of producing a fighter to Japan's requirements.

The Japan Air Self-Defense Force (JASDF) acquired 203 F-15Js and 20 F-15DJs, of which 2 F-15Js and 12 F-15DJs were built by McDonnell Douglas in St. Louis, Missouri. Dubbed the "Peace Eagle" by the DoD FMS program, the first F-15J built in St. Louis was delivered to the United States Air Force for its first flight on 4 June 1980, and a subsequent cruise on 15 July to Japan. Additionally, 8 F-15Js were manufactured in large components and shipped to Japan for final assembly by Komaki of Mitsubishi, the first of these (serial number 12–8803) making its maiden flight on 26 August 1981. Companies divided the remainder share and produced it under license from 1981, with final assembly of aircraft performed by Mitsubishi.

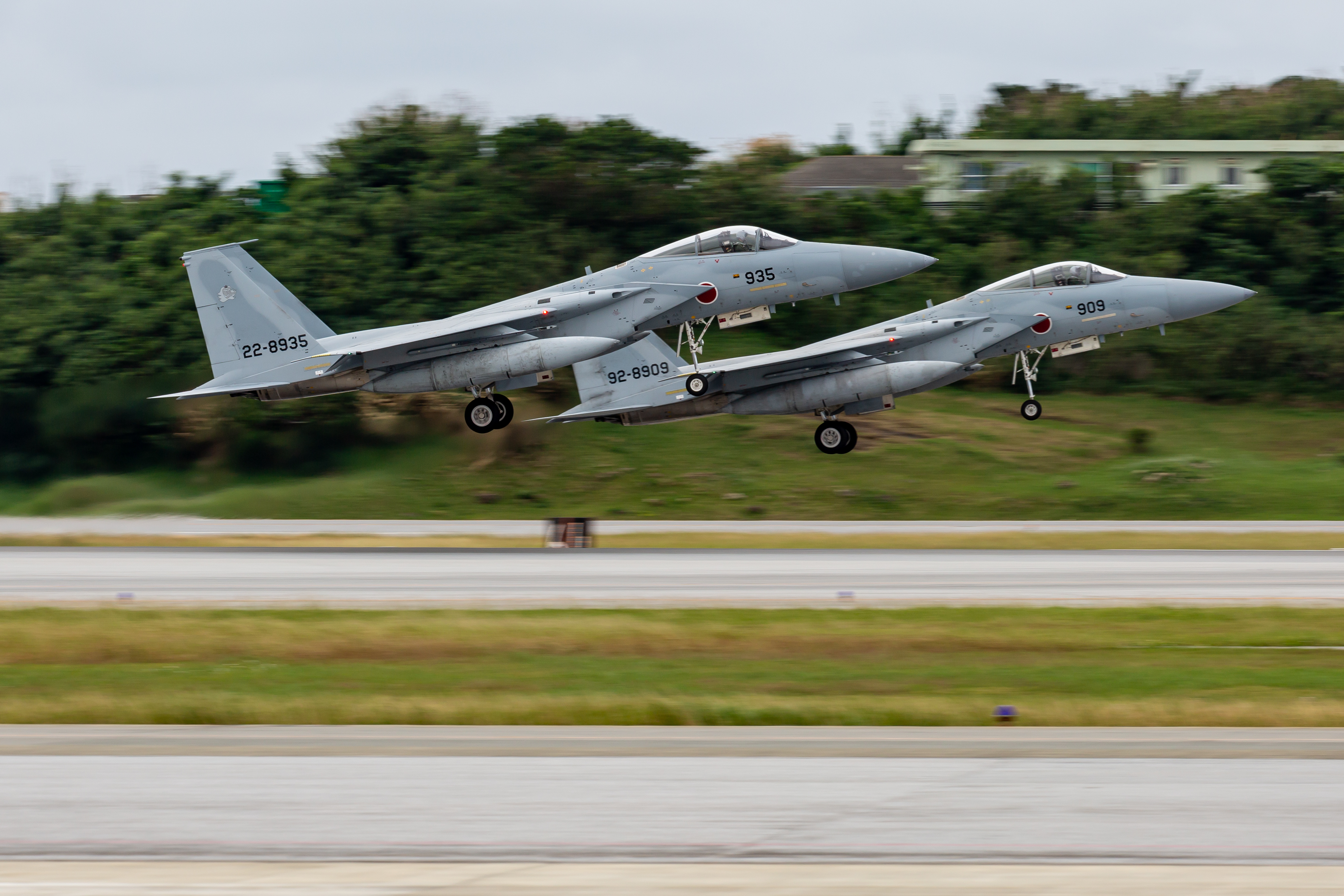
Two F-15Js taking off at the Naha Air Show in 2018

In the latter period of 1981, the first F-15J/DJ aircraft were sent to 202nd Tactical Fighter Squadron, which was reorganized as an Eagle FTU and renamed the 23 Flying Training Squadron at Nyutabaru base on 21 December 1982. The JASDF developed a plan to form the first squadron after the KAL007 shootdown by a Soviet Su-15 on 1 September 1983. In March 1984, new F-15Js began replacing the 203rd Tactical Fighter Squadron's F-104Js at Chitose Air Base, located across the La Pérouse Strait from the Soviet fighter base on Sakhalin Island.

On 24 December 2018, it was announced that Japan is considering selling their F-15s to the U.S. in order to acquire funds to purchase F-35s.

The Japanese Ministry of Defense confirmed on February 4, 2022 that 68 F-15Js will be upgraded through the Japan Super Interceptor (JSI) programme under a cost of JPY646.5 billion (USD5.6 billion). Boeing was awarded an undefinitized contract not-to-exceed $24,550,000 for the F-15 Japan Super Interceptor program.

== Design ==
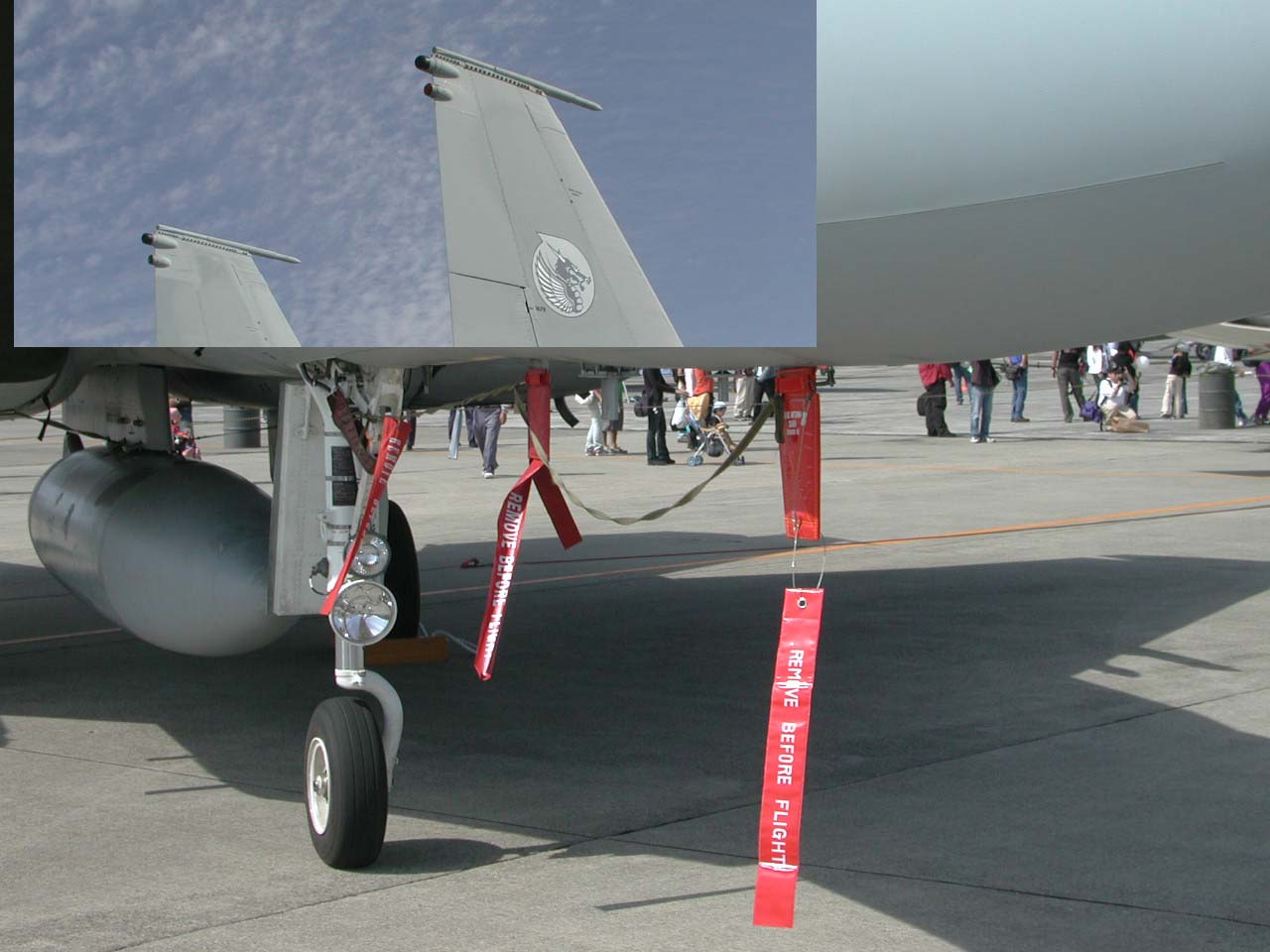
An ECM antenna position of Mitsubishi F-15J MSIP (2005)

F-15J/DJs are identical to F-15C/Ds aside from the ECM, radar warning system, and nuclear equipment. The AN/ALQ-135 Internal Countermeasures System is replaced by the indigenous J/ALQ-8 and the AN/ALR-56 Radar warning receiver is replaced by the J/APR-4. The engine is the Pratt & Whitney F100 turbofan, produced under license by IHI Corporation. Some aircraft still have an inertial measurement unit, an old type of the inertial navigation system. All F-15J/DJs have two UHF radios, which are also VHF capable.

The F-15J is characterized by an indigenous data link, but they do not support Link 16 FDL mounted by USAF F-15Cs. It works as a basic bidirectional link with the Japanese ground-controlled intercept network, and it is limited because it is not a true network.

Mitsubishi received the F-15C/D Multistage Improvement Program (MSIP) and in 1987 began upgrading the F-15J/DJs. Improvements included an uprated central computer, engines, armament control set and added the J/APQ-1 countermeasures set. The F100-PW-220 (IHI-220) was upgraded to the F100-PW-220E (IHI-220E) with a digital engine electronic control retrofit. Differences in appearance from earlier F-15Js include the J/ALQ-8 ICS with an ICS antenna mounted under the intake. The J/APQ-4 RWR antenna position on the F-15J/DJs is the same as F-15C/Ds, but the lens of F-15J/DJ MSIPs is black rather than white for F-15C/Ds.

=== Improvements and upgrades ===
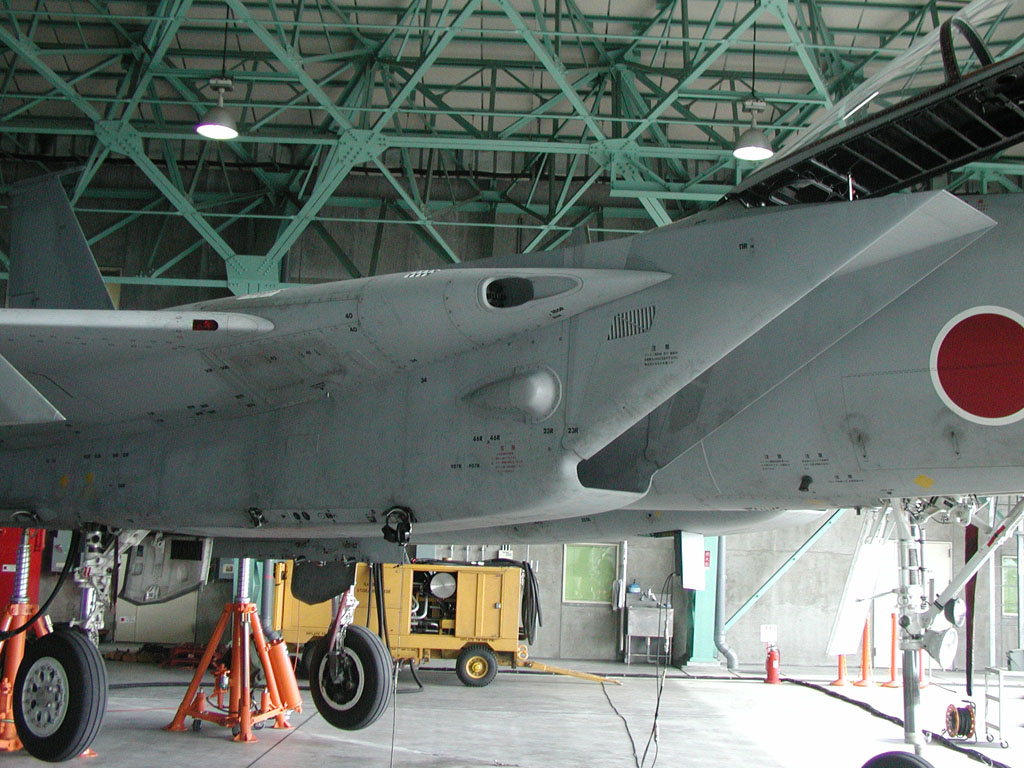
An F-15J after the 2nd phase MTDP modernization with changes visible around the intake (2008)

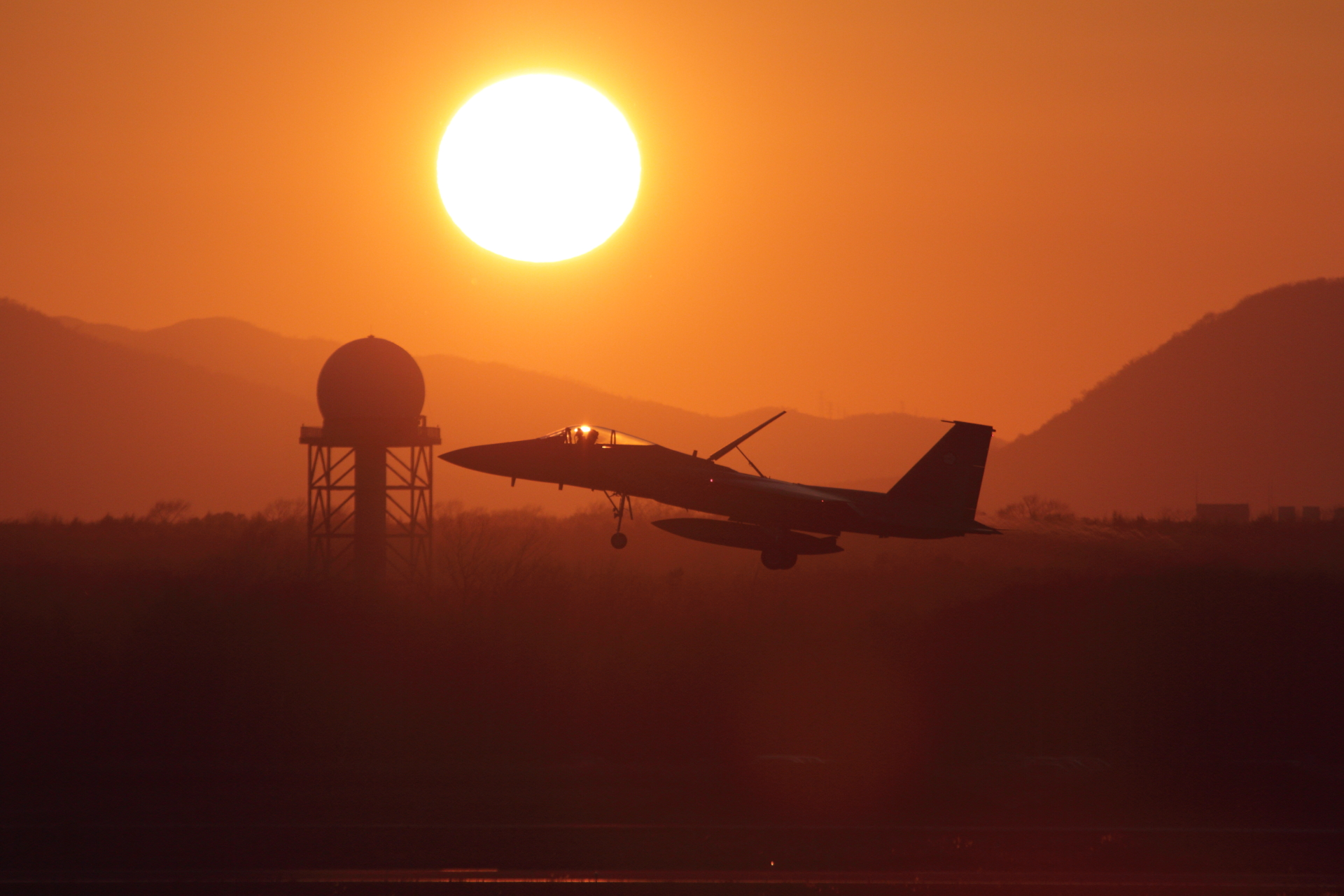
F-15J at Chitose Air Base (2010)

F-15Js have been equipped with the Japanese-built AAM-3 missile, a Japanese successor to the AIM-9 Sidewinder follow-on with distinctive "barbed" forward fins. Japan has been investigating an advanced fighter to replace the F-15, meanwhile the F-15J fleet is being modernized. On 28 July 2003, the first upgraded F-15J (#928) made its first flight, and it was delivered to the JASDF Air Development Test Wing on 21 October 2003.

On 10 December 2004, the Japanese Government approved a Mid-Term Defense Program (MTDP) to modernize the F-15J MSIPs over five years in accordance with new National Defense Program Guidelines. The upgrade is being implemented in phases, but ultimately the upgrade will include a new ejection seat; replaced IHI-220E engines; more powerful processor; uprated electrical generation and cooling capabilities to support more avionics and the Raytheon AN/APG-63(V)1 radar. which has been produced under license by Mitsubishi Electric since 1997. Raytheon expects the radar will ultimately be installed in 80 F-15Js. The new radar will support the AAM-4 missile, the Japanese answer to the AMRAAM.

The Ministry of Defense (MoD) requested the modernization and deployment of reconnaissance aircraft in June 2007, and it was planned to upgrade some F-15Js with synthetic aperture radar pods; these aircraft would replace the RF-4 Phantom IIs currently in service.

On 17 December 2009, the reconnaissance upgrade disappeared from the budget after the Democratic Party of Japan took power following the 2009 general election, and priority was given instead to improvement of the F-15J and the Mitsubishi F-2. The number of F-15J upgrades was increased from 26 to 48, and the MoD purchased part of the modernization for 38 fighters. However, the full budget for modernization is incomplete. 48 F-15Js would get a Link 16 datalink and helmet-mounted sight under this upgrade program. The helmet-mounted sight will support the AAM-5 dogfighting missile, which will replace the AAM-3.

On 17 December 2010, modernization was funded for 16 F-15Js but the MoD reduced this to 10 F-15Js.

In late October 2019, the US Defense Security Cooperation Agency approved a possible sale to Japan of up to 103 APG-82(V)1 Active Electronically Scanned Array (AESA) Radars, 116 Advanced Display Core Processor II Mission System Computers and 101 AN/ALQ-239 Digital Electronic Warfare Systems for the upgrade of 98 F-15Js to a "Japanese Super Interceptor" (JSI) configuration for an estimated cost of $4.5 billion. It can also carry a large air-to-surface weapon on its centerline weapon station, such as an AGM-158B JASSM-ER or AGM-158C LRASM, giving the aircraft an air-to-ground and anti-ship capability. In July 2020, Boeing signed an agreement with MHI to provide assistance and support to the program. Work on this program was set to start in 2022.

== Variants ==
F-15J
Single-seat all-weather air-superiority fighter version for the Japan Air Self-Defense Force 139 built under license in Japan by Mitsubishi Heavy Industries in 1981–97, two built in St. Louis.
F-15DJ
Two-seat training version for the Japan Air Self-Defense Force. 12 built in St. Louis, and 25 built under license in Japan by Mitsubishi in the period 1981–1997.

== Operators ==
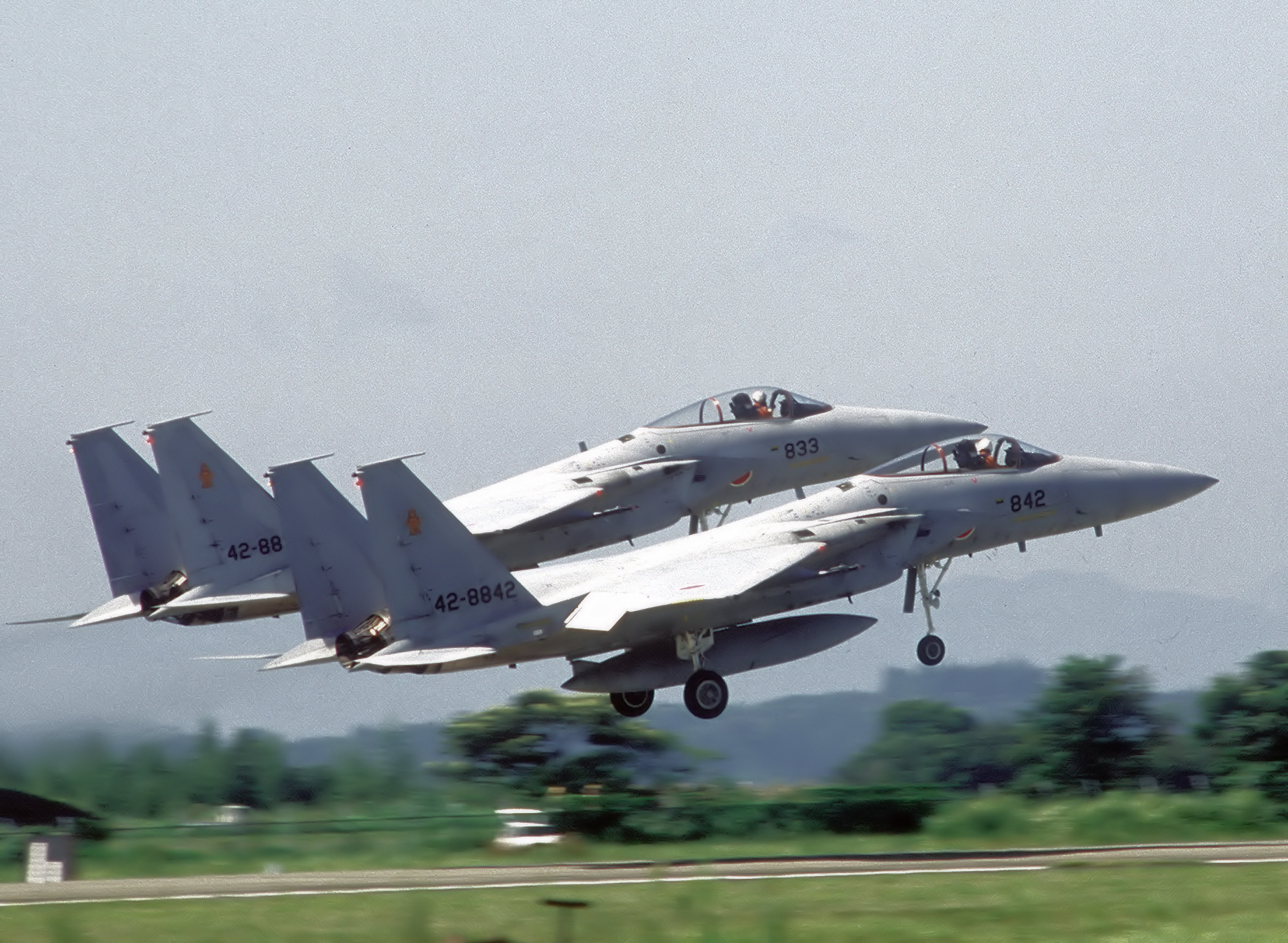
Two F-15J Eagles of 202nd Tactical Fighter Squadron take off during a joint USA/Japan exercise (1985)

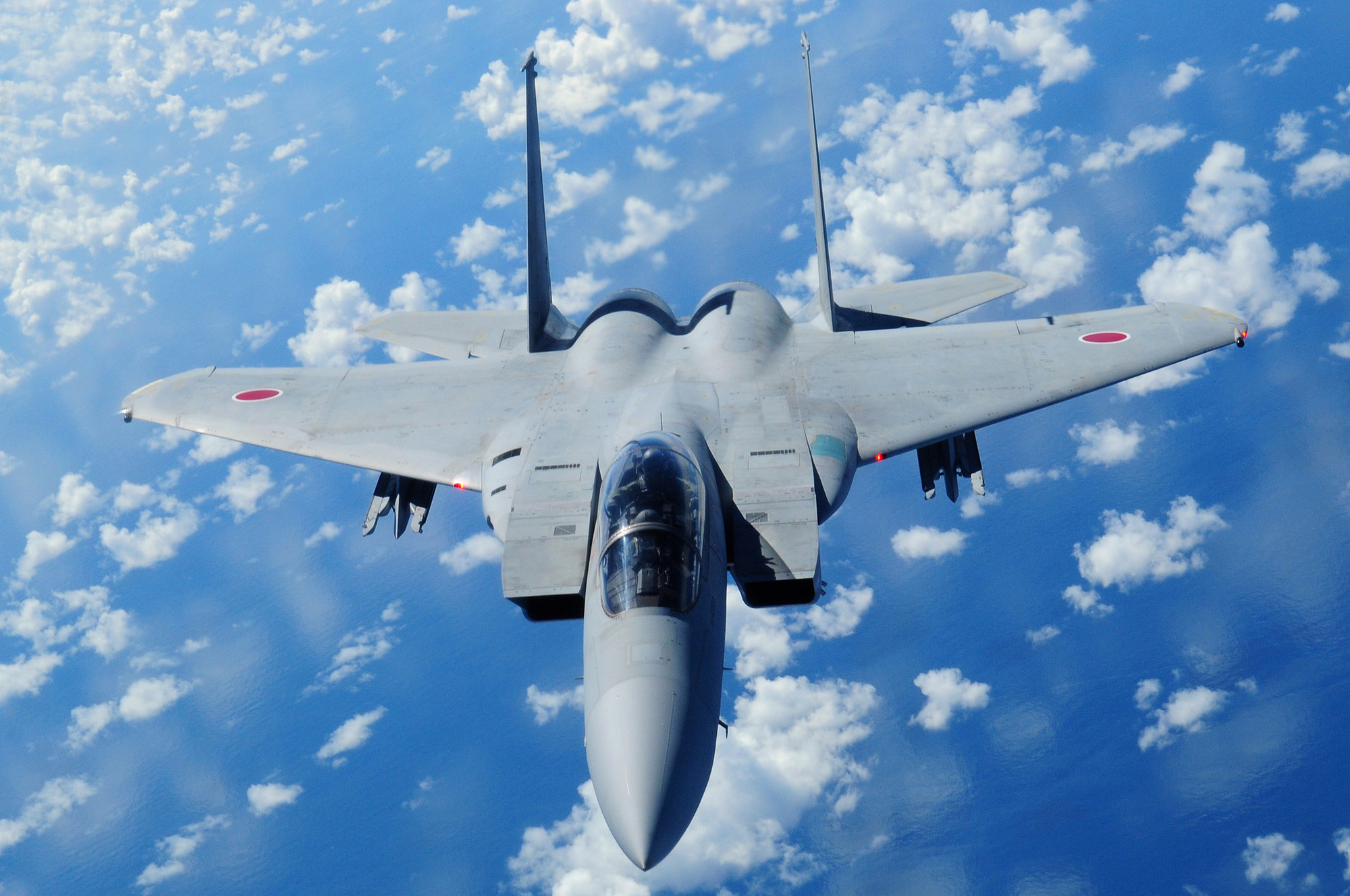
F-15DJ after refueling from a US Air Force KC-135 (2009)

Japan

- Japan Air Self Defense Force has 155 F-15J and 45 F-15DJ aircraft in service as of 2020.
  - 2nd Air Wing Chitose Air Base
    - 201st Tactical Fighter Squadron (1986–)
    - 203rd Tactical Fighter Squadron (1983–)
  - 6th Air Wing Komatsu Air Base
    - 303rd Tactical Fighter Squadron (1987–)
    - 306th Tactical Fighter Squadron (1997–)
  - 5th Air Wing Nyutabaru Air Base
    - 202nd Tactical Fighter Squadron (1981–2000)
    - 305th Tactical Fighter Squadron (1993–)
  - 9th Air Wing Naha Air Base
    - 204th Tactical Fighter Squadron (1984–)
    - 304th Tactical Fighter Squadron (1990–)
  - Air Development and Test Wing - Gifu Airbase
  - 23rd Flying Training Squadron (2000–) - Nyutabaru Air Base
  - Air Tactics Development Wing[ja]
    - Tactical Fighter Training Group(1990-) - Komatsu Air Base

== Specifications (F-15J) ==
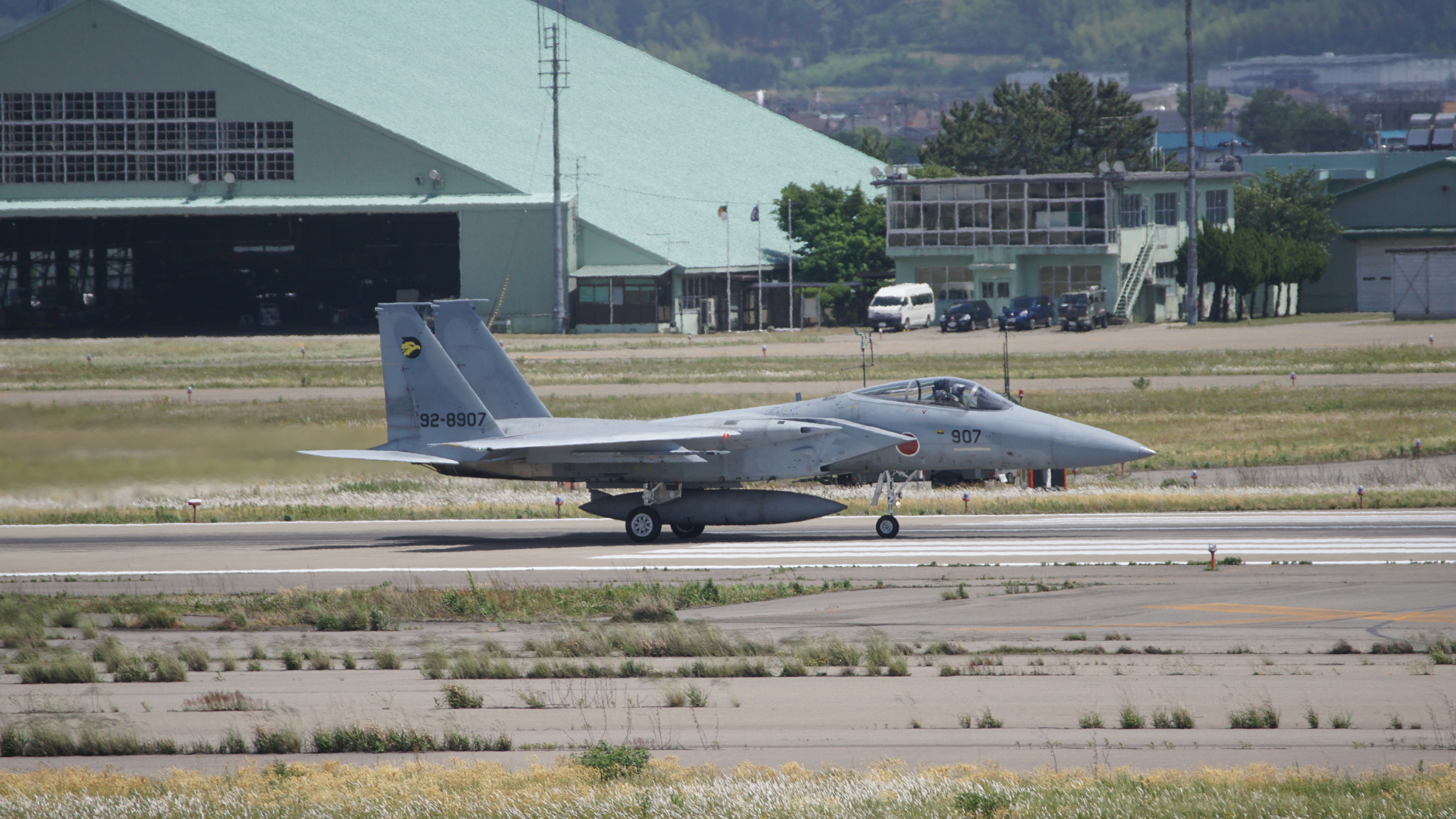
306 Sqn F-15J taxiing at Komatsu Air Base (2017)

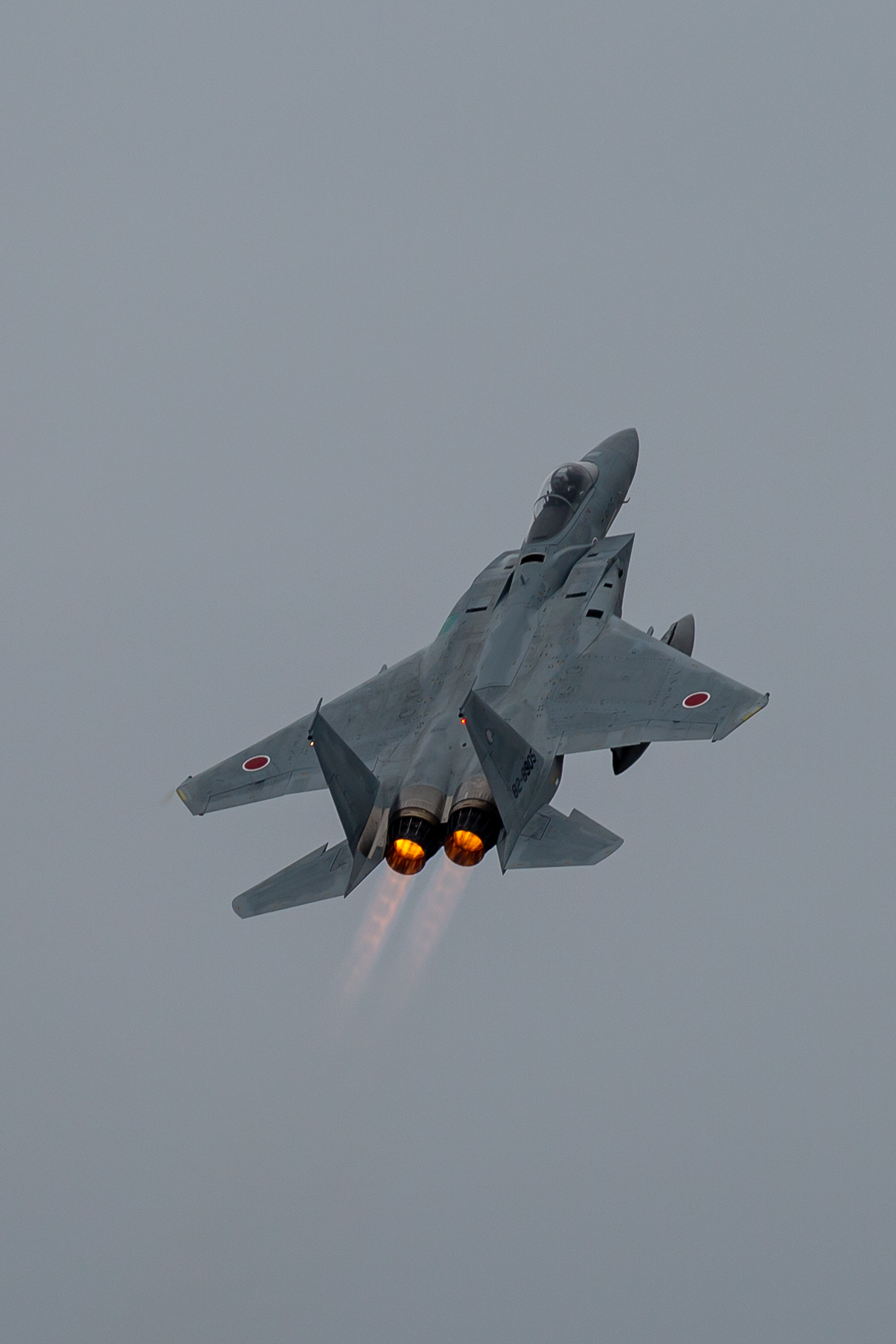
An F-15J taking off at the Naha Air Show in 2018

Data from

General characteristics

- Crew: 1
- Length: 19.43 m (63 ft 9 in)
- Wingspan: 13.05 m (42 ft 10 in)
- Height: 5.63 m (18 ft 6 in)
- Wing area: 56.5 m^{2} (608 sq ft)
- Airfoil: root: NACA 64A006.6; tip: NACA 64A203
- Empty weight: 12,700 kg (27,999 lb)
- Gross weight: 20,200 kg (44,533 lb)
- Max takeoff weight: 30,845 kg (68,002 lb)
- Fuel capacity: 6,100 kg (13,448 lb) internal
- Powerplant: 2 × Pratt & Whitney F100-220 (or −100)The engine is a Pratt & Whitney F100 built under licence by IHI Corporation . afterburning turbofan engine, 77.62 kN (17,450 lbf) thrust each dry, 111.2 kN (25,000 lbf) with afterburner

Performance

- Maximum speed: 2,650 km/h (1,650 mph, 1,430 kn) / M2.5+ at high altitude

1,450 km/h (900 mph; 780 kn) / M1.2 at low altitude

- Service ceiling: 20,000 m (66,000 ft)
- Rate of climb: 254 m/s (50,000 ft/min)
- Wing loading: 358 kg/m^{2} (73 lb/sq ft)
- Thrust/weight: 1.12

Armament

- Guns: 1× 20 mm M61 Vulcan 940 shells.
- Hardpoints: 10 , with provisions to carry combinations of:
  - Missiles:
    - Air-to-air missiles
      - Mitsubishi AAM-3
      - Mitsubishi AAM-4
      - Mitsubishi AAM-5
      - AIM-9 Sidewinder
      - AIM-7 Sparrow
    - Air-to-ground missiles
      - AGM-158 JASSM
    - Bombs
      - Mk 82 General-Purpose Bomb
      - CBU-87 Cluster bomb

== See also ==
- Fighter units of the Japan Air Self-Defense Force
- List of F-15 losses, Japan

Aircraft of comparable role, configuration, and era

- Grumman F-14 Tomcat
- McDonnell Douglas F/A-18 Hornet
- Panavia Tornado ADV
- Sukhoi Su-27/Shenyang J-11

Related lists

- List of military aircraft of Japan
