= 204th Tactical Fighter Squadron (JASDF) =

- 第204飛行隊
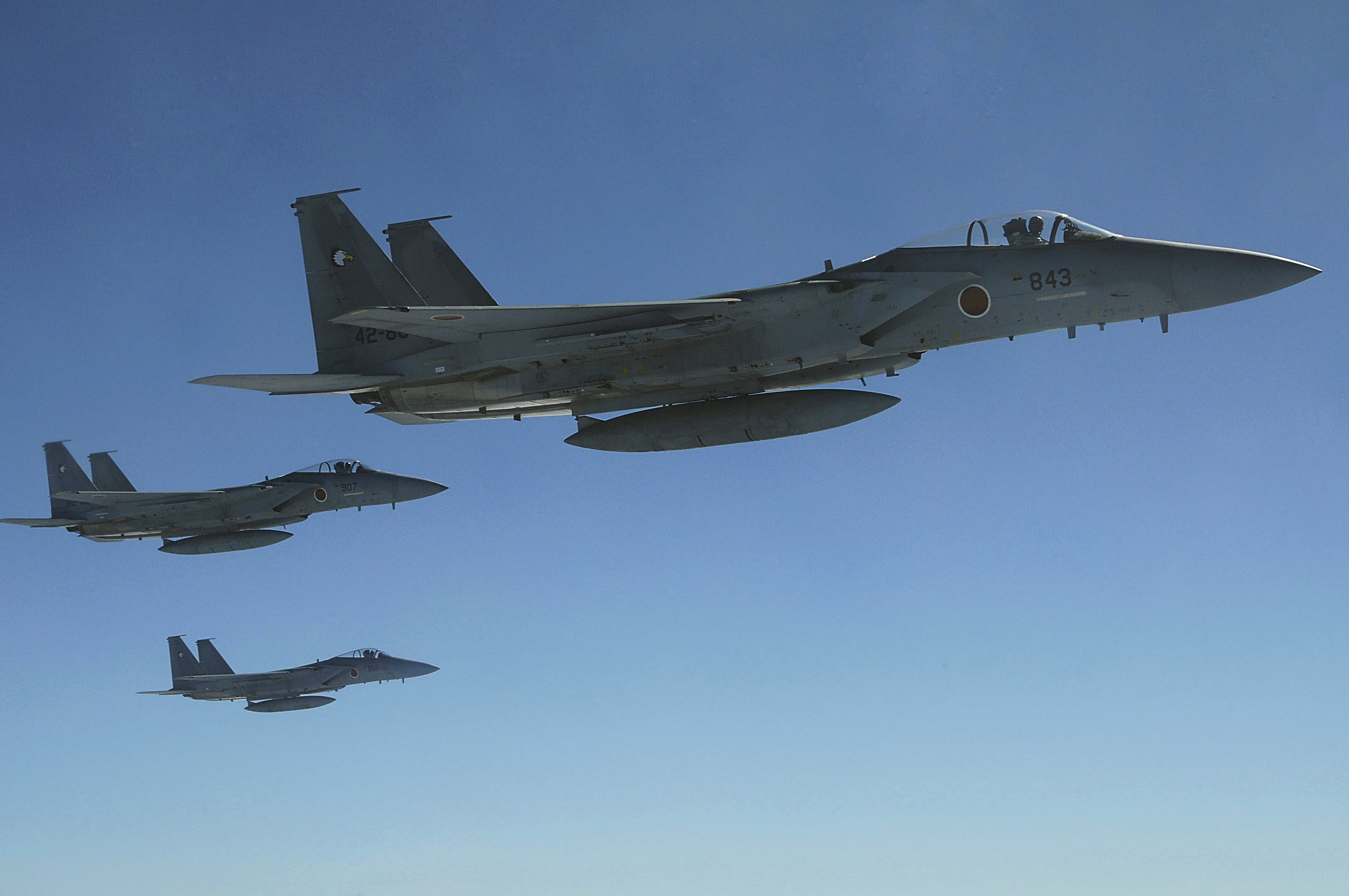
- 204 Squadron Mitsubishi F-15Js (2010)
- Active: December 1, 1964 – present
- Country: Japan
- Branch: Japan Air Self-Defense Force
- Part of: Southwestern Air Defense Force, 9th Air Wing
- Garrison/HQ: Naha Air Base

Aircraft flown
- Fighter: Mitsubishi F-15J/DJ
- Trainer: Kawasaki T-4

The 204th Tactical Fighter Squadron (第204飛行隊 (dai-ni-hyaku-yon-hikoutai)) is a squadron of the 9th Air Wing of the Japan Air Self-Defense Force. It is based at Naha Air Base, in Okinawa Prefecture, Japan. It is equipped with Mitsubishi F-15J/DJ and Kawasaki T-4 aircraft.

== History ==
The squadron was founded as part of the 5th Air Wing on December 1, 1964, at Nyutabaru Air Base as a Lockheed F-104J/DJ squadron. It began as a conversion squadron under Lieutenant Colonel Tadashi Matsuzaki, former commander of the 201st Tactical Fighter Squadron based at Chitose Air Base in Hokkaido. It took on Quick Reaction Alert duties from October 1968. It was temporarily based at Komatsu Air Base in 1980 and 1981 before returning to Nyutabaru.

In 1985 it upgraded to the F-15J/DJ and became part of the 7th Air Wing at Hyakuri Air Base in Ibaraki Prefecture. It was partly responsible for the air defense of Tokyo. This move prompted the 301st Tactical Fighter Squadron to move to Nyutabaru as a replacement.

In 2009 the squadron moved from Hyakuri to Naha Air Base in Okinawa Prefecture, swapping with the F-4EJ equipped 302nd Tactical Fighter Squadron which moved to Hyakuri. The 204th became the southernmost of the JASDF's F-15 Eagle squadrons.

The squadron's aircraft participated in the Cope North exercise at Andersen Air Force Base in Guam in 2012.

In September 2017 it conducted training with US Rockwell B-1B Lancer bombers.

== Tail marking ==
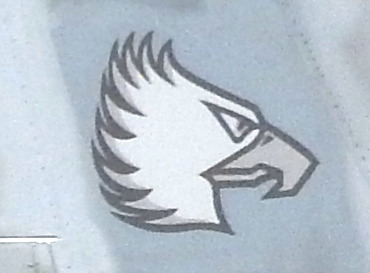
Tail marking (2016)

During the F-104 era the squadron's tail marking was a blue and yellow "V", signifying the 5th Air Wing. Since 1984 (when the F-15 Eagle was adopted) the squadron's aircraft carry a bald eagle as their tail marking.

== Aircraft operated ==
=== Fighter aircraft ===
- Lockheed F-104J/DJ (1964–1984)
- Mitsubishi F-15J/DJ (1984–present)

=== Liaison aircraft ===
- Lockheed T-33A (1964–1993)
- Kawasaki T-4 (1992–present)

== See also ==
- Fighter units of the Japan Air Self-Defense Force
