= 10th Squadron (JASDF) =

- 第10飛行隊
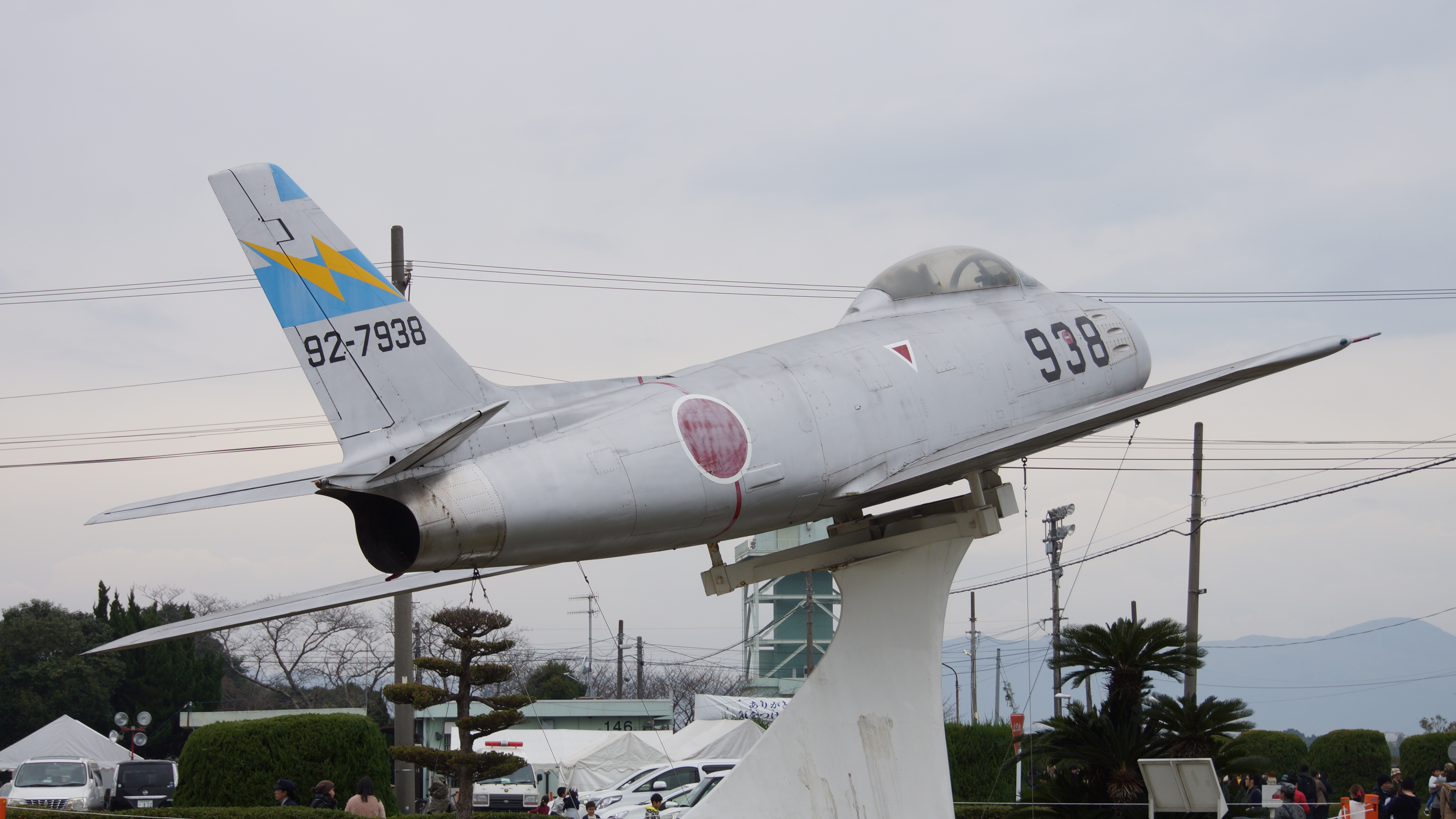
- A Japanese F-86F Sabre on display
- Active: January 18, 1962
- Disbanded: April 1, 1977
- Country: Japan
- Branch: Japan Air Self-Defense Force
- Part of: Western Air Defense Force, 8th Air Wing
- Garrison/HQ: Tsuiki Air Field

Aircraft flown
- Fighter: North American F-86F Sabre

The 10th Squadron (第10飛行隊 (dai-juu-hikoutai)) was a squadron of the 8th Air Wing of the Japan Air Self-Defense Force based at Tsuiki Air Field, in Fukuoka Prefecture, Japan. It was equipped with North American F-86F Sabre aircraft.

== History ==
On January 18, 1962, the squadron was formed at Nyutabaru Air Base in Miyazaki Prefecture as part of the 5th Air Wing. After five months it was attached to the 7th Air Wing. On May 15, 1962, it moved along with the 6th Squadron to Nyutabaru Air Base in Miyazaki Prefecture.

It was disbanded on April 1, 1977. Squadrons 1-11 were F-86F squadrons. It was replaced by the 304th Tactical Fighter Squadron which was equipped with F-4EJ Phantom II aircraft.

== Aircraft operated ==
=== Fighter aircraft ===
- North American F-86F Sabre（1962-1977）

== See also ==
- Fighter units of the Japan Air Self-Defense Force
