= 9th Air Wing (JASDF) =

- 第9航空団
- Active: January 31, 2016
- Country: Japan
- Branch: Japan Air Self-Defense Force
- Part of: Southwestern Air Defense Force
- Garrison/HQ: Naha Air Base

Aircraft flown
- Fighter: Mitsubishi F-15J/DJ
- Trainer: Kawasaki T-4

The 9th Air Wing (第9航空団 (dai-kyuu-koukudan)) is a wing of the Japan Air Self-Defense Force. It comes under the authority of the Southwestern Air Defense Force. It is based at Naha Air Base in Okinawa Prefecture.

As of 2017 it has two squadrons, both equipped with Mitsubishi F-15J/DJ and Kawasaki T-4 aircraft:

- 204th Tactical Fighter Squadron
- 304th Tactical Fighter Squadron

== Gallery ==
Aircraft

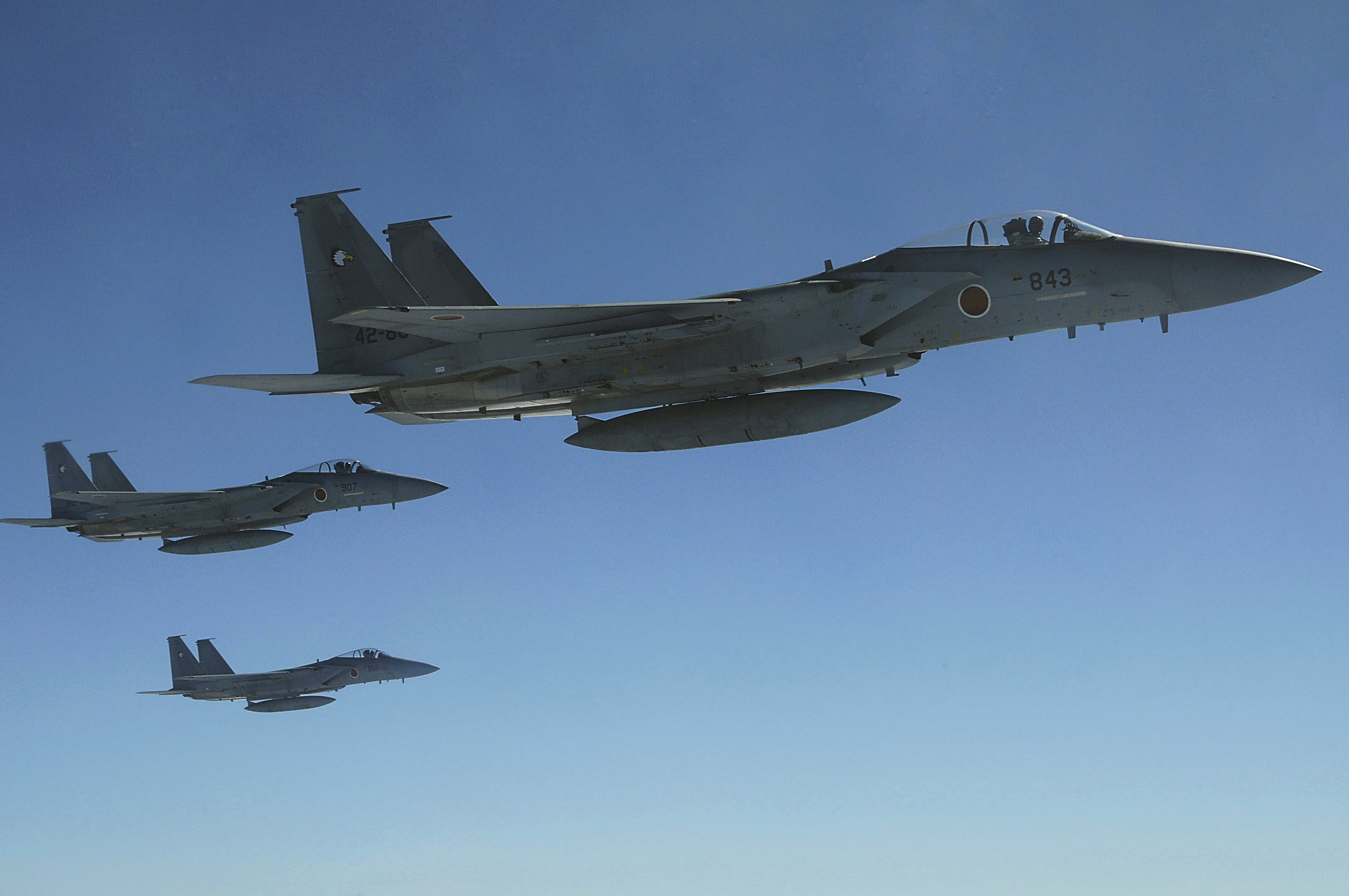
F-15Js of 204 Sqn in flight (2010)

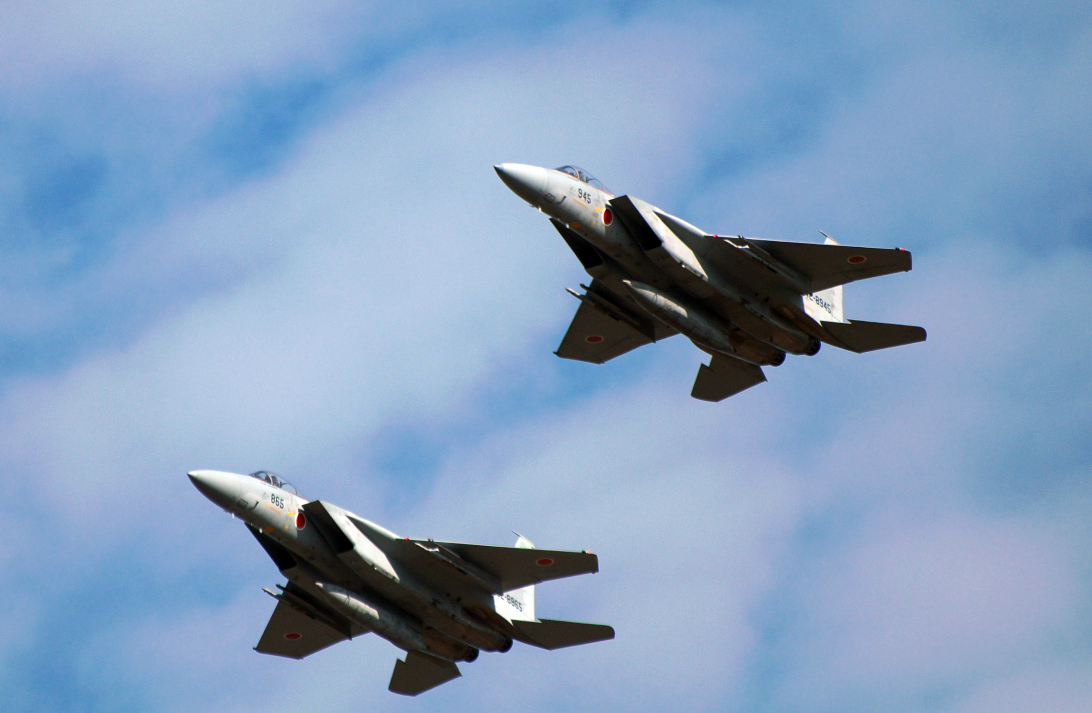
F-15Js of 304 Sqn in flight (2008)

== See also ==
- Fighter units of the Japan Air Self-Defense Force
