= Cope North =

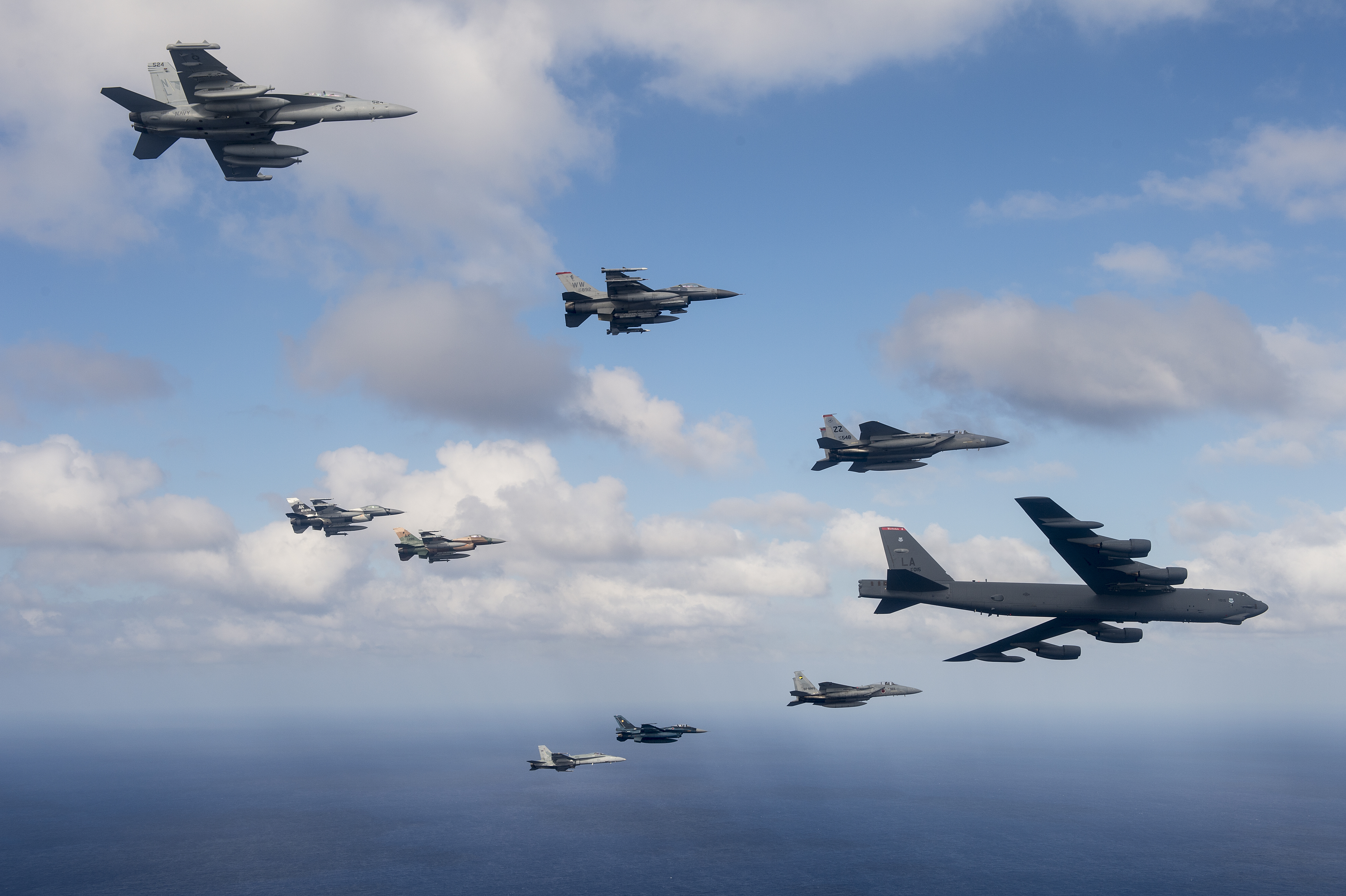
Formation flight during Cope North 2015

Cope North is an annual multinational military exercise taking place in and around Guam. The first exercise took place in 1978.

In 2016 in addition to US, Japan, Australia, South Korea, the Philippines and New Zealand participated. This was the largest ever Cope North exercise. 2017 and 2018 saw a return to the usual participants - US, Japanese and Australian forces.
