= 1st Technical School (JASDF) =

- 航空自衛隊第1術科学校
- Active: September 1, 1954
- Country: Japan
- Allegiance: Air Training Command
- Branch: Japan Air Self-Defense Force
- Garrison/HQ: Hamamatsu Air Base

The 1st Technical School (航空自衛隊第1術科学校, kōkūjieitai-dai-ichi-jutsukagakkō) is a training unit belonging to Air Training Command of the Japan Air Self-Defense Force based at Hamamatsu Air Base in Shizuoka Prefecture, Japan.

== Aircraft operated ==
=== Fighter ===
- F-4EJ Kai Phantom II
- Mitsubishi F-15J/DJ
- Mitsubishi F-2A

=== Trainer ===
- Kawasaki T-4
- Fuji T-7
