= Japan Air Self-Defense Force =

Air warfare branch of Japan's armed forces

- 航空自衛隊 (Japanese); Kōkū Jieitai
- Emblem of the Air Self-Defense Force
- Founded: 1 July 1954; 72 years ago
- Country: Japan
- Type: Air force Space force
- Role: Aerial warfare; Space warfare; Cyberwarfare; Electronic warfare
- Size: 49,913 personnel (2018); 745 aircraft
- Part of: Japan Self-Defense Forces
- Headquarters: Ichigaya, Shinjuku, Tokyo
- Mottos: "Key to Defense, Ready Anytime!"
- Website: www.mod.go.jp/asdf/

Commanders
- Commander-in-Chief: Prime Minister Sanae Takaichi
- Minister of Defense: Shinjirō Koizumi
- Chief of Staff, Joint Staff: General Hiroaki Uchikura
- Chief of Staff, Air Self-Defense Force: General Takehiro Morita

Insignia
- Roundel

- Flag

Aircraft flown
- Electronic warfare: E-767, E-2C/D, YS-11EA/EB
- Fighter: F-15J/DJ, F-2A/B, F-35A/B
- Helicopter: UH-60J, CH-47J (LR)
- Trainer: T-7, T-400, T-4
- Transport: C-2, C-130H, Hawker 800, Gulfstream IV, Boeing 777
- Tanker: KC-767, KC-130

The Japan Air Self-Defense Force (Japanese: 航空自衛隊, Hepburn: Kōkū Jieitai), JASDF (空自, Kūji), also referred to as the Japanese Air Force, is the air and space branch of the Japan Self-Defense Forces, responsible for the defense of Japanese airspace, other air and space operations, cyberwarfare and electronic warfare. The JASDF carries out combat air patrols around Japan, while also maintaining a network of ground and air early-warning radar systems. The branch also has an aerobatic team known as Blue Impulse and has provided air transport in UN peacekeeping missions.

The JASDF had an estimated 49,913 personnel as of 2018, and as of 2023 operates about 712 aircraft, approximately 321 of them being fighter aircraft.

The service was to be renamed in 2027 to the Japan Air and Space Self-Defense Force (航空宇宙自衛隊, Kōkū Uchū Jieitai), in recognition of the increasing importance of the space domain. However, the schedule was then changed to 2026 in the 2026 defense budget.

== History ==
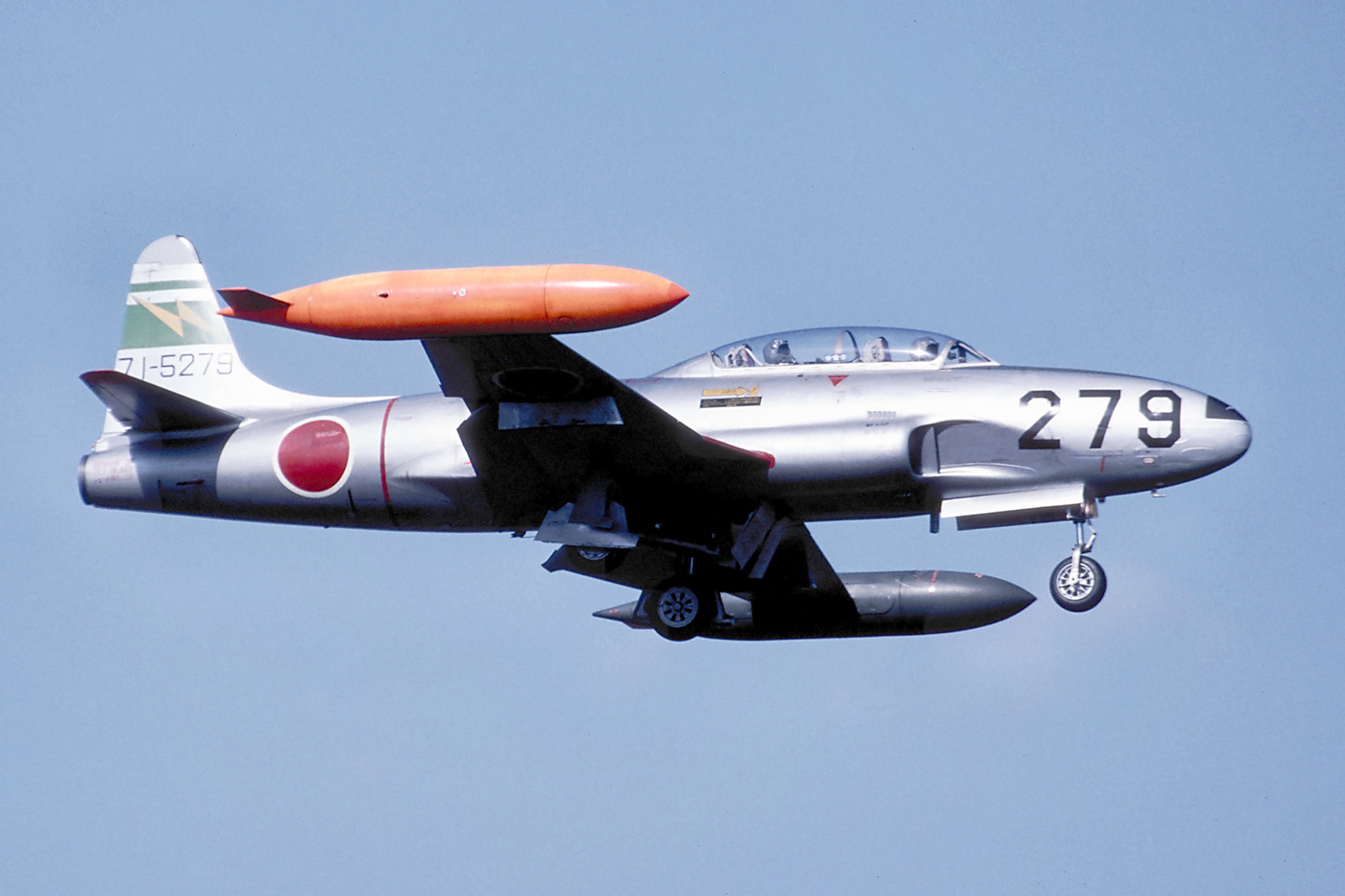
A JASDF Lockheed T-33 trainer

Japan did not have a separate air force before and during World War II. Aviation operations were carried out by the Imperial Japanese Army Air Service and the Imperial Japanese Navy Air Service (Kōkūtai). Following defeat in World War II, the Imperial Japanese Army and Navy (including their respective Air Services) were disbanded in 1945.

Under the supervision of the United States occupation authorities, a pacifist Japanese government was appointed in place of the militaristic governments that administered the Empire of Japan during the war. The new government drafted a postwar constitution. While the primary intent of this endeavor was to place the country's political structure on a firmly democratic footing, the constitution endorsed by the United States and ratified by the Diet of Japan in 1947 also contained Article 9 which strictly prohibited Japan from having a regular military.

The U.S. occupation formally ended in 1952, although a large American garrison remained in Japan, to defend the country. The victory of the Chinese Communist Party in the Chinese Civil War and the onset of the Korean War led the Americans to reconsider what role the Japanese could be expected to play in, at the very least, defending their own home islands against growing Chinese, Soviet and North Korean power in the region. Under U.S. guidance, on 1 July 1954 the National Security Board was reorganized as the Defense Agency, and the National Security Force was reorganized afterwards as the Japan Ground Self-Defense Force (de facto post-war Japanese Army), the Coastal Safety Force was reorganized as the Japan Maritime Self-Defense Force (de facto post-war Japanese Navy) and the Japan Air Self-Defense Force (de facto post-war Japanese Air Force) was established as a new branch of JSDF. General Keizō Hayashi was appointed as the first Chairman of Joint Staff Council—professional head of the three branches. The enabling legislation for this was the 1954 Self-Defense Forces Act (Act No. 165 of 1954).

The Far East Air Force, U.S. Air Force, announced on 6 January 1955, that 85 aircraft would be turned over to the fledgling Japanese air force on about 15 January, the first equipment of the new force.

The JASDF Air Defense Command (Japan) Headquarters was relocated from Fuchu Air Base to Yokota Air Base on March 26, 2012. The relocation is due to the 2002 Defense Policy Review Initiative. The purpose is to strengthen the U.S.-Japan Security Alliance. The ADC Headquarters does command and control operations to defend Japanese airspace.

Until 2015, women were banned from becoming fighter jet and reconnaissance aircraft pilots. The first female pilot of an F-15 joined the ranks, along with three other female pilots currently in training, in 2018.

Since 2008, the number of scrambles to intercept Chinese aircraft has increased rapidly. In 2010 there were scrambles against 31 Chinese aircraft and 193 Russian aircraft. In 2018 scrambles increased to against 638 Chinese aircraft and against 343 Russian aircraft. Chinese aircraft flight paths are mostly in the East China Sea, around the Ryukyu Islands and through the Korea Strait. Russia frequently has conducted flights orbiting Japan with military aircraft.

The Ministry of Defense reported in fiscal 2018 that there were 999 scrambles by JASDF jets against mainly Chinese and Russian unidentified aircraft. That was the second highest amount of scrambles by the JASDF since 1958. 638 (64%) were Chinese aircraft and 343 (34%) were Russian aircraft. On June 20, 2019, two Russian bombers (Tupolev Tu-95) violated Japanese airspace twice on the same day.

The Diet of Japan approved the modification of the ships of the Izumo-class to operate STOVL aircraft and in 2019 ordered 42 STOVL Lockheed Martin F-35 Lightning IIs. The US Marines will operate their own STOVL F-35s from the Izumo-class in cooperation with the ship's crew to build up a Japanese capability to operate this type. The current plan is for the Japan Air Self-Defense Force to operate the STOVL F-35B from land bases once delivered.

As of 2020, the JASDF is under increasing pressure to intercept warplanes from China's People's Liberation Army Air Force (PLAAF) close to entering its air space. As of the last fiscal year ending in March 2020, the JASDF scrambled aircraft a record 947 times to intercept PLAAF warplanes. This has resulted in heavy wear and tear on their F-15J fighter aircraft, due to this, as of 2021, the JASDF intercepted fewer PLAAF warplane approaches and deployed F-35 fighter jets to supplement the F-15J fighter jets in this role.

On 17 March 2021, the Mitsubishi F-4EJ Phantom II was retired after 50 years of service with the JASDF, being replaced by the F-35A.

During the 9 months of fiscal year 2021, JASDF fighters scrambled against 785 inbound flights. Chinese aircraft were intercepted 571 times (70%), and 199 Russian aircraft. The majority of the Chinese aircraft flew over Okinawa prefecture.

On 22 October 2023, the JASDF conducted its first-ever trilateral exercise with the South Korean and United States air forces near the Korean Peninsula.

The JASDF's Mitsubishi F-2 fighters are slated to be replaced by a future sixth-generation stealth fighter developed under the Global Combat Air Programme (GCAP). This aircraft would be designed by a joint venture set-up in mid-2025 with manufacturing and assembly being subcontracted to Britain's BAE Systems, Italy's Leonardo, and Japan's Mitsubishi Heavy Industries.

As of October 2024, a trilateral organisation called the GCAP International Government Organization (GIGO) would oversee the entire project; it would be headquartered in the UK and led by former Japanese Vice Minister of Defense Masami Oka. The fighter is slated to be deployed by 2035 and would be a crewed platform which would possibly be capable of directing other autonomous aircraft.

From 17th September 2025, several Kawasaki C-2 and Mitsubishi F-15J were deployed to RAF Coningsby from Chitose Air Base as part of the 'Atlantic Eagle Deployment', the first JASDF deployment to Europe.

== Organization ==
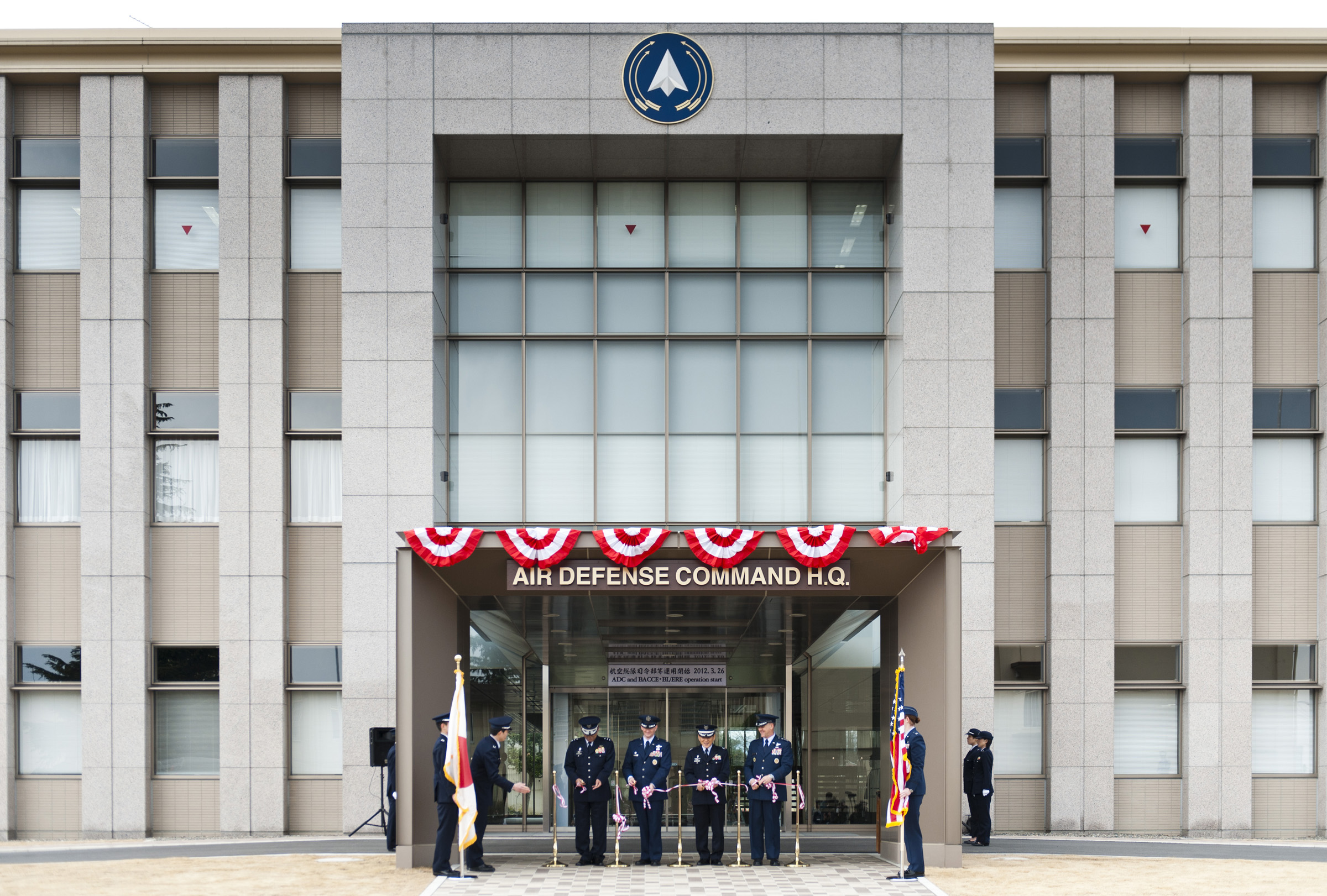
Japan Air Self-Defense Force Air Defense Command Headquarters (2012)

Major units of the JASDF are the Air Defense Command, Air Support Command, Air Training Command, Air Development and Test Command, and Air Materiel Command. The Air Support Command is responsible for direct support of operational forces in rescue, transportation, control, weather monitoring and inspection. The Air Training Command is responsible for basic flying and technical training. The Air Development and Test Command, in addition to overseeing equipment research and development, is also responsible for research and development in such areas as flight medicine. On May 19, 2020, the JASDF officially inaugurated its Space Operation Squadron.

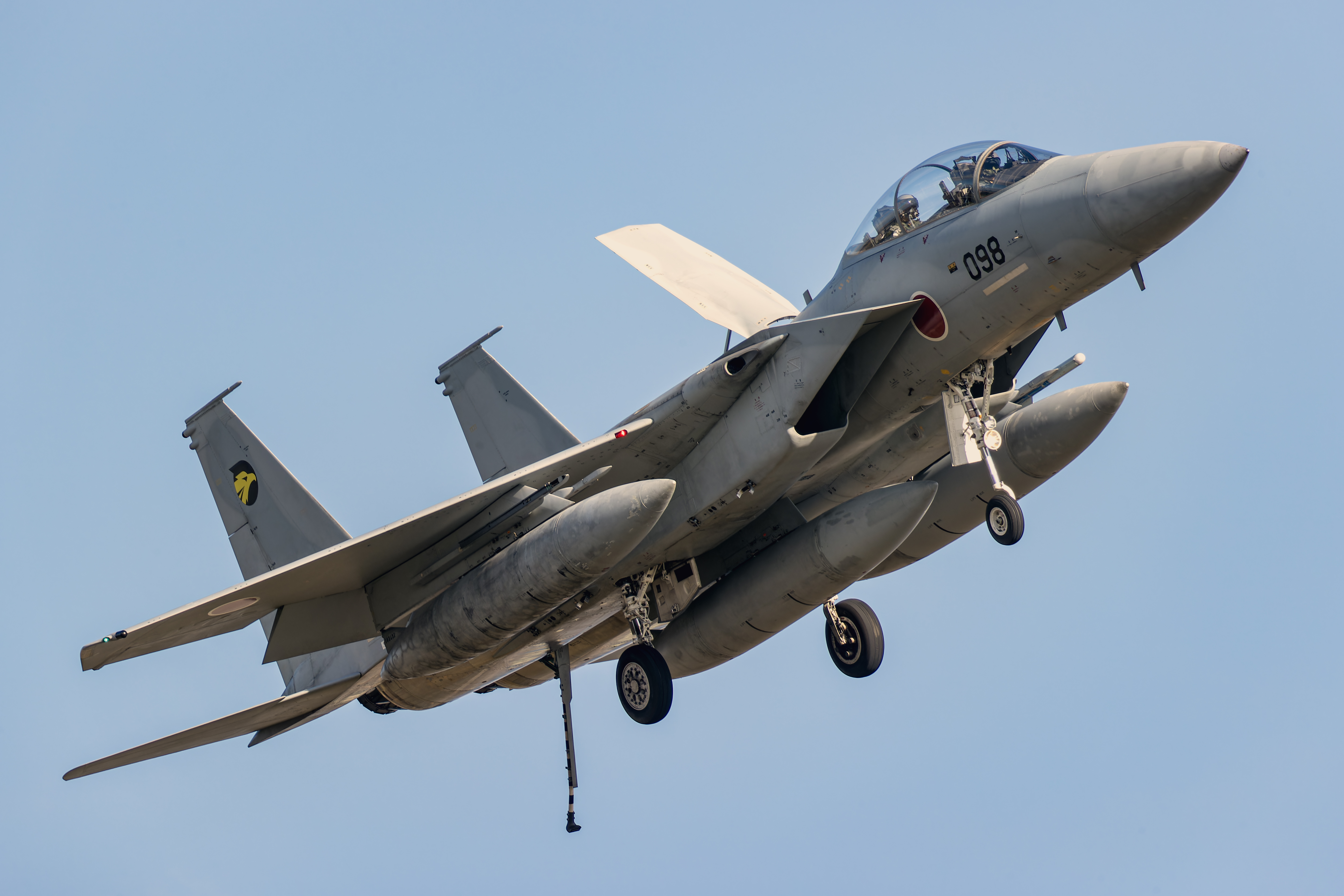
F-15DJ Eagle

The Air Defense Command has northern, central, and western regional headquarters located at Misawa, Iruma, and Kasuga, respectively and the Southwestern Composite Air Division based at Naha, Okinawa Prefecture. All four regional headquarters control surface-to-air missile units of both the JASDF and the JGSDF located in their respective areas.

- Prime Minister of Japan
  - Minister of Defense
    - JASDF Chief of Staff / Air Staff Office
      - Air Defense Command: Yokota, Fussa, Tokyo
        - Northern Air Defense Force: Misawa, Aomori
          - 2nd Air Wing (Chitose Air Base: 201SQ, F-15J/DJ, T-4; 203SQ, F-15J/DJ, T-4)
          - 3rd Air Wing (Misawa Air Base: 301SQ, F-35A, T-4; 302SQ, F-35A, T-4)
          - Northern Air Command Support Flight, (Misawa, T-4)
          - Northern Aircraft Control & Warning Wing
          - Northern Air Defense Missile Group (9th, 10th, 11th, 20th, 21st, 22nd, 23rd and 24th Air Defense Missile Squadron)
        - Central Air Defense Force: Iruma, Saitama
          - 6th Air Wing (Komatsu Air Base: 303SQ, F-15J/DJ, T-4; 306SQ, F-15J/DJ, T-4)
          - 7th Air Wing (Hyakuri Air Base: 3SQ, F-2A/B T-4)
          - Central Air Command Support Squadron (Iruma Air Base T-4, U-4)
          - Central Aircraft Control & Warning Wing
          - Central Air Defense Missile Group (1st, 2nd, 3rd, 4th, 12th, 13th, 14th and 15th Air Defense Missile Squadron)
          - Iwo Jima Air Base Group
        - Western Air Defense Force: Kasuga, Fukuoka
          - 5th Air Wing (Nyutabaru Air Base: 305SQ, F-15J/DJ, T-4)
          - 8th Air Wing (Tsuiki Air Base: 6SQ, F-2A/B, T-4; 8SQ, F-2A/B, T-4)
          - Western Air Command Support Squadron, (Kasuga, T-4)
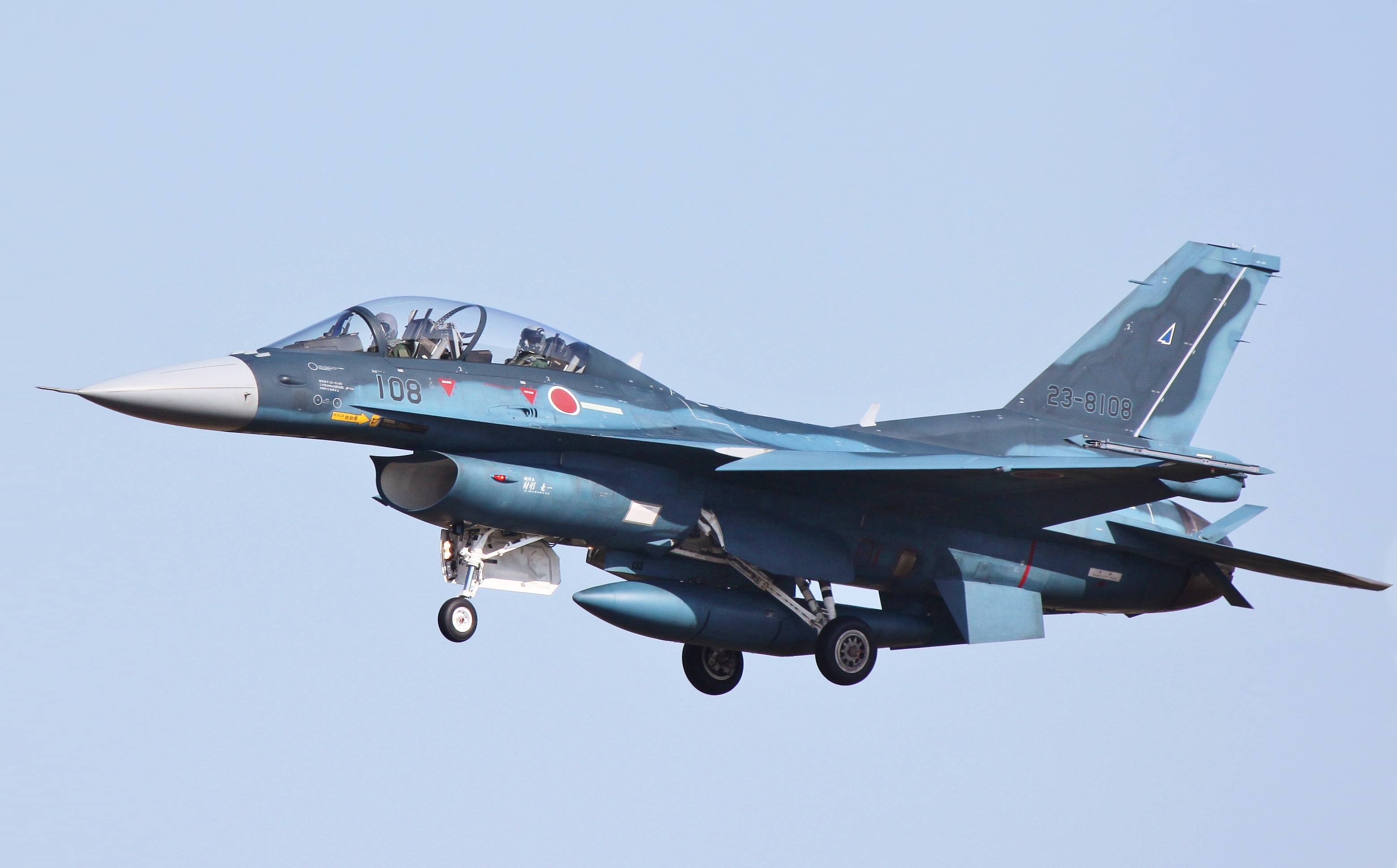
            F-2B
          - Western Aircraft Control & Warning Wing
          - Western Air Defense Missile Group (5th, 6th, 7th, and 8th Air defense Missile Squadron)
        - Southwestern Air Defense Force: Naha, Okinawa
          - 9th Air Wing (Naha Air Base: 204SQ, F-15J/DJ, T-4; 304SQ, F-15J/DJ, T-4
          - Southwestern Air Command Support Squadron, T-4)
          - Southwestern Aircraft Control & Warning Wing
          - Southwestern Air Defense Missile Group (16th, 17th, 18th and 19th Air Defense Missile Squadron)
        - Airborne Early Warning and Control Wing: Hamamatsu Air Base )
          - Flight Warning and Control Group: Hamamatsu Air Base
            - 602SQ, E-767
            - Operation Information Squadron
          - Flight Alert Monitoring Group: Misawa Air Base
            - 601SQ, E-2C/D: Misawa Air Base
            - 603SQ, E-2C/D: Naha Air Base
          - 1st Maintenance Group
          - 2nd Maintenance Group
        - Air Tactics Development Wing (Yokota Air Base)
          - Tactical Fighter Training Group: Komatsu Air Base (F-15DJ/J, T-4)
          - Electronic Warfare Squadron Iruma Air Base (EC-1, YS-11EB)
          - Electronic Intelligence Squadron Iruma Air Base (YS-11EB)
        - Air Rescue Wing
          - Detachments: Chitose, Matsushima, Ashiya, Akita, Hyakuri, Nyutabaru, Niigata, Hamamatsu, Naha, Komatsu, Komaki (Training Squadron) (UH-60J, U-125A)
          - Helicopter Airlift Squadrons: Iruma (CH-47J (LR)), Kasuga (CH-47J (LR)), Misawa (CH-47J (LR)), Naha (CH-47J (LR))
        - Air Defense Missile Training Group: Hamamatsu, Chitose
    - Air Support Command: Fuchū Air Base, Tokyo
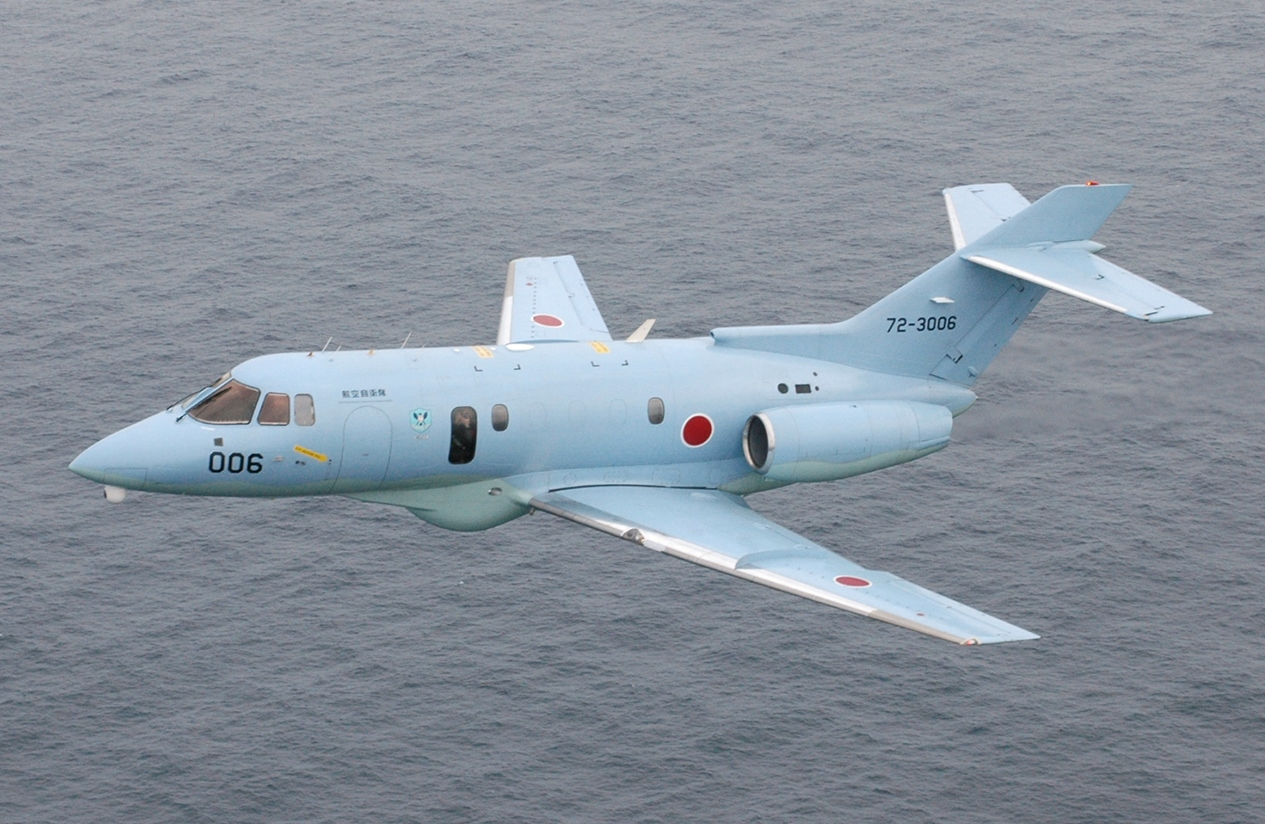
      A U-125A aircraft
      - 1st Tactical Airlift Group (Komaki Air Base: 401SQ, C-130H, KC-130H; 404SQ, KC-767)
      - 2nd Tactical Airlift Group (Iruma Air Base: 402SQ, C-1, U-4)
      - 3rd Tactical Airlift Group (Miho Air Base: 403SQ, C-1, C-2; 405SQ, KC-46)
      - Air Traffic Control Service Group
      - Air Weather Group
      - Flight Check Squadron (Iruma Air Base: U-125)
      - Special Airlift Group: (701SQ Chitose Air Base: Boeing 777-300ER as Japanese Air Force One)
    - Air Training Command: Hamamatsu, Shizuoka
      - 1st Air Wing (Hamamatsu Air Base: 31SQ, T-4; 32SQ, T-4, 41SQ, T-400)
      - 4th Air Wing (Matsushima Air Field: F-2B; 11SQ, T-4 Blue Impulse 21SQ)
      - 11th Flying Training Wing (Shizuhama Air Base: 1SQ, T-7; 2SQ, T-7)
      - 12th Flight Training Wing (Hofu kita Air Base: 1SQ, T-7; 2SQ, T-7)
      - 13th Flight Training Wing (Ashiya Air Base: 1SQ, T-4; 2SQ, T-4)
      - Fighter Training Group (Nyutabaru Air Base: 23SQ (Ex-202SQ), F-15DJ, T-4)
      - 1st, 2nd, 3rd, 4th & 5th Technical School
      - Air Basic Training Wing
      - Air Training Aids Group
      - Air Officer Candidate School
    - Air Development and Test Command: Iruma Air Base, Saitama
      - Air Development and Test Wing (Gifu Air Base: F-15J/DJ, F-2A/B, C-1FTB, C-2, T-7, T-4)
      - Electronics Development and Test Group
      - Aeromedical Laboratory
    - Air Material Command: Jujou, Tokyo
      - 1st, 2nd, 3rd & 4th Air Depot
    - Air Staff College
    - Air Communications and Systems Wing
    - Aerosafety Service Group
    - Central Air Base Group
    - Space Operations Squadron
Fighter bases: F-15J/F-15DJ Eagle F-35A Lightning II F-2A/B
Training bases: T-4 T-7 Other bases:

== Ranks ==
=== Commissioned officer ranks ===
The rank insignia of commissioned officers.

| Rank group | General / flag officers | | | Senior officers | | | Junior officers |
|---|---|---|---|---|---|---|---|---|---|---|
| Japan Air Self-Defense Force |
| Japan Air Self-Defense Force | 幕僚長および統合作戦司令官たる空将; Bakuryōchō-oyobi-Tōgōsakusenshireikan-taru-kūshō | 空将; Kūshō | 空将補; Kūshō-ho | 1等空佐; Ittō kūsa | 2等空佐; Nitō kūsa | 3等空佐; Santō kūsa | 1等空尉; Ittō kūi | 2等空尉; Nitō kūi | 3等空尉; Santō kūi | 准空尉; Jun kūi |

=== Other ranks ===
The rank insignia of non-commissioned officers and enlisted personnel.

| Rank group | Senior NCOs | | | | Junior NCOs | | Enlisted |
|---|---|---|---|---|---|---|---|---|
| Japan Air Self-Defense Force |
| Japan Air Self-Defense Force | 空曹長; Kūsōchō | 1等空曹; Ittō kūsō | 2等空曹; Nitō kūsō | 3等空曹; Santō kūsō | 空士長; Kūshichō | 1等空士; Ittō kūshi | 2等空士; Nitō kūshi | 自衛官候補生; Jieikan kōhosei |

== Equipment ==
The JASDF maintains an integrated network of radar installations and air defense direction centers throughout the country known as the Basic Air Defense Ground Environment. In the late 1980s, the system was modernized and augmented with E-2C Hawkeye airborne early warning aircraft. The nation relies on fighter-interceptor aircraft and surface-to-air missiles to intercept hostile aircraft. Both of these systems were improved from the beginning of the late 1980s. Outmoded aircraft were replaced in the early 1990s with more sophisticated models, and Nike-J missiles have been replaced with the modern Patriot PAC-2 and PAC-3 system and M167 VADS. Multiple tests by North Korea with so-called hypersonic missiles are currently prompting Japan to consider purchasing the Israeli Arrow-3 system. The JASDF also provides air support for ground and sea operations of the JGSDF and the JMSDF and air defense for bases of all the forces. Base defenses were upgraded in the late 1980s with new surface-to-air missiles, modern antiaircraft artillery and new fixed and mobile aircraft shelters. To facilitate mobile control in case of emergency deployments or rapid response, the JASDF also employed the cylindrical J/TPS-102 3D radar for battlefield air control.

=== Aircraft ===
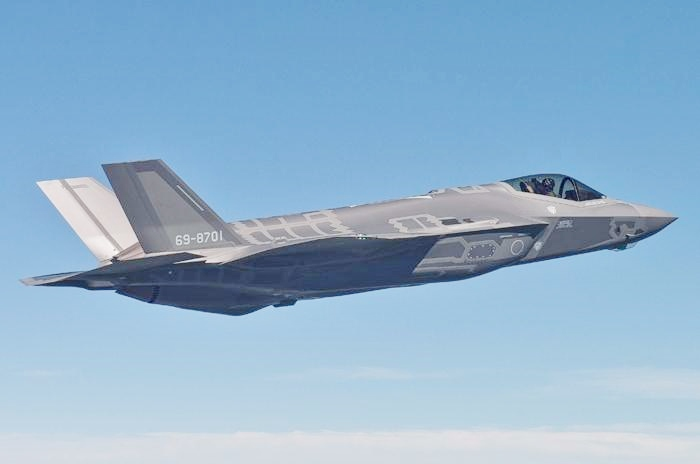
A JASDF F-35A

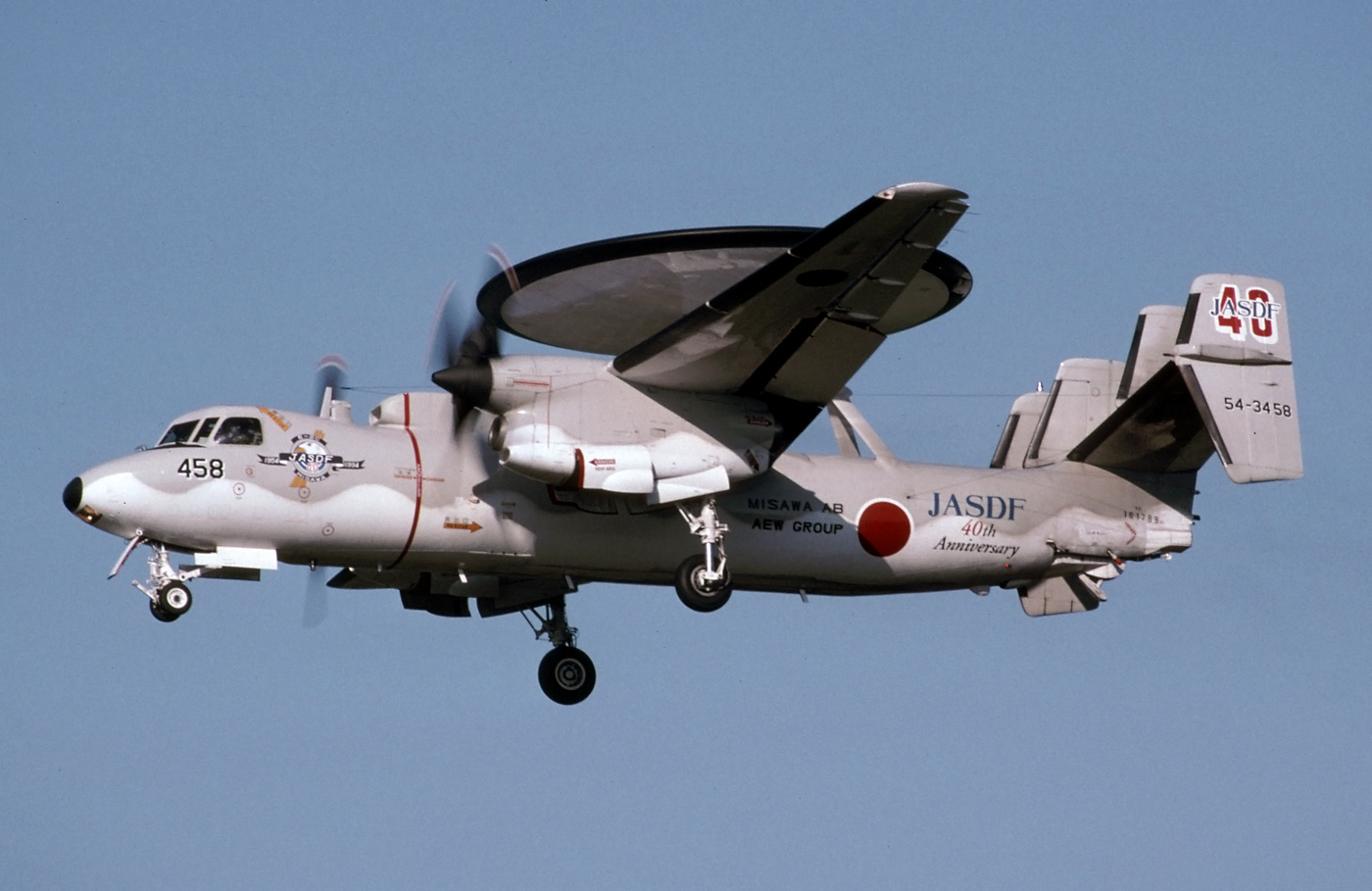
An E-2C Hawkeye landing at Misawa Air Base

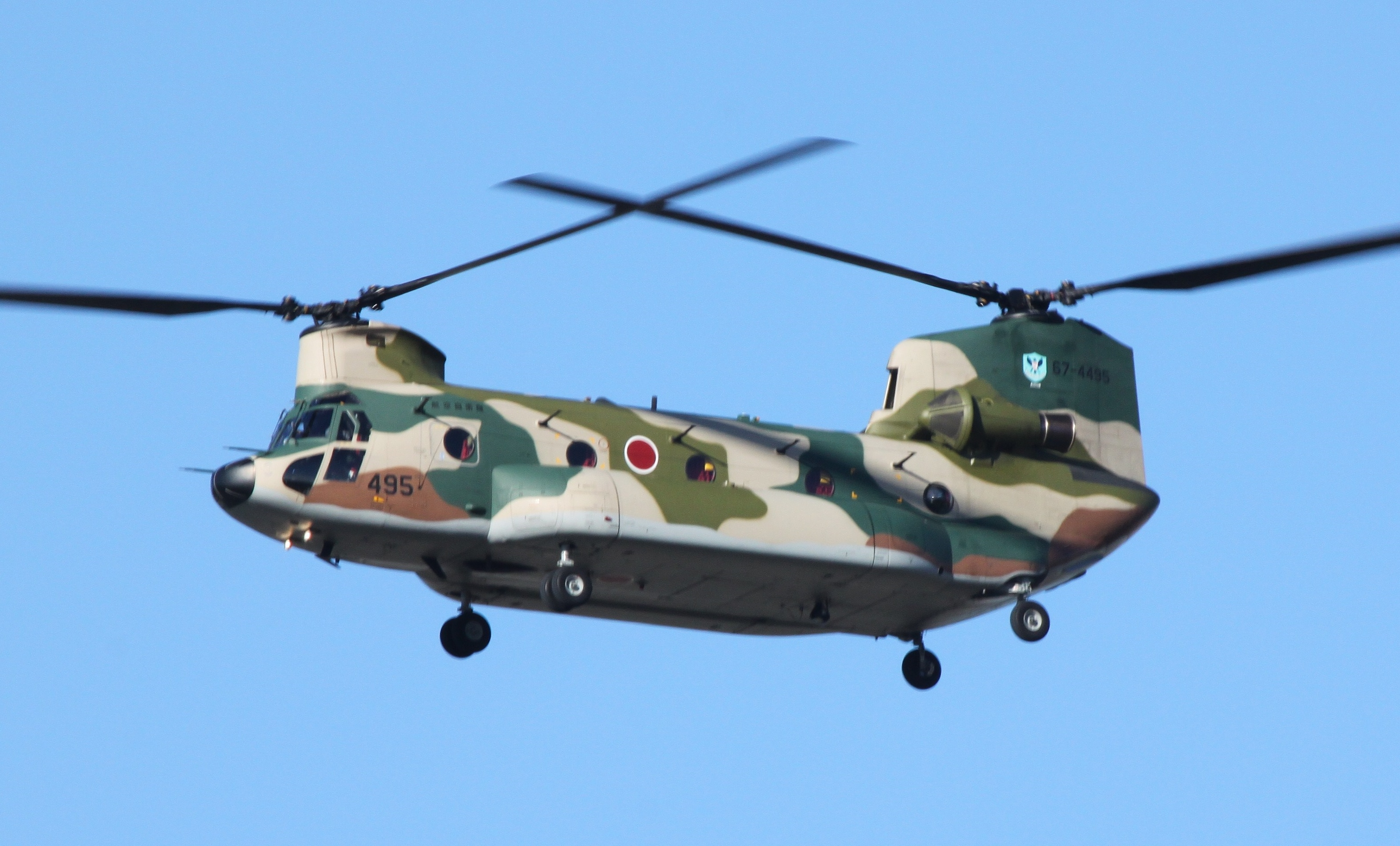
A CH-47J from Iruma Air Base

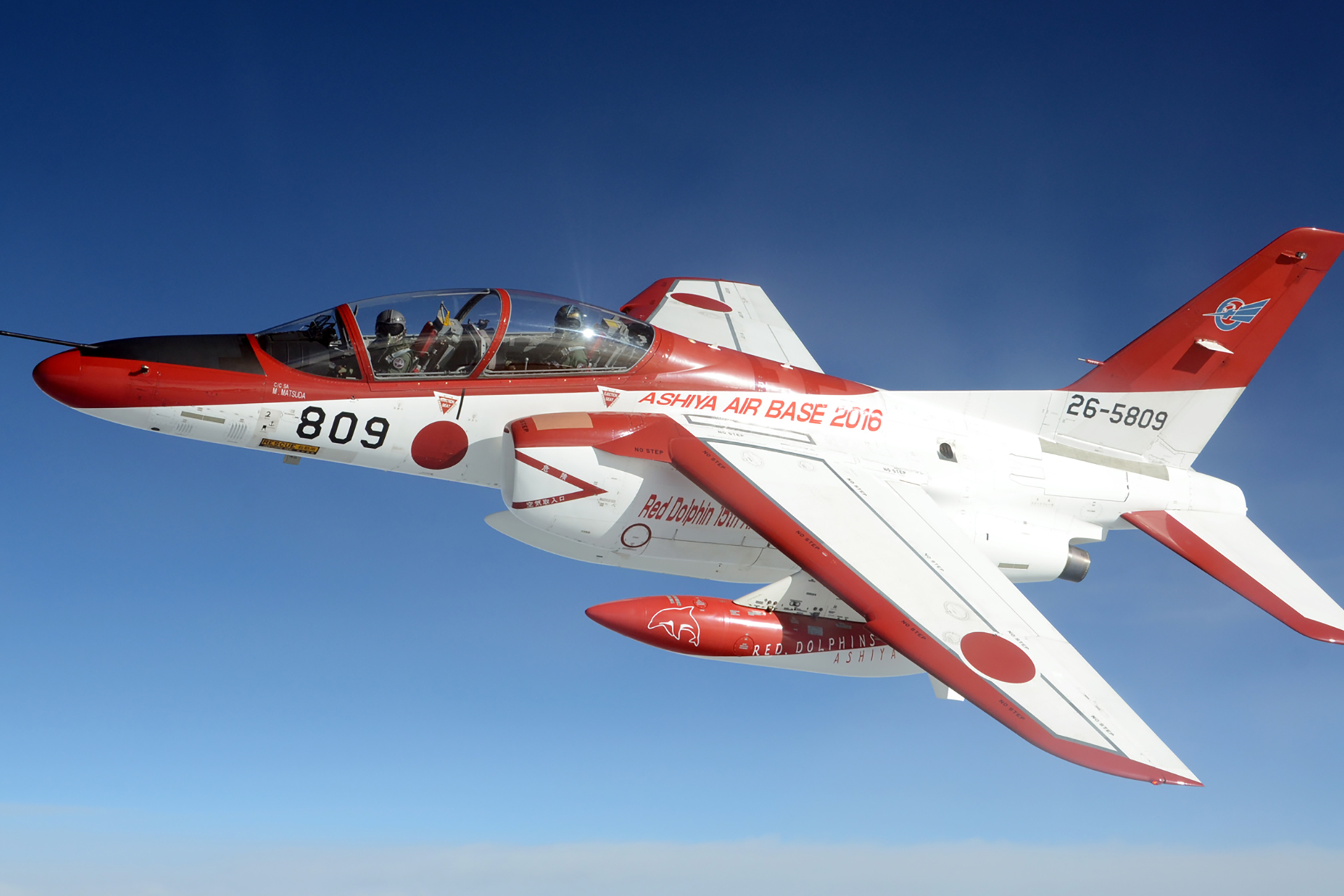
A Kawasaki T-4

| Aircraft | Origin | Type | Variant | In service | Notes |
Combat aircraft
| F-15 Eagle | United States / Japan | Air superiority | F-15J | 155 | licensed produced by Mitsubishi |
| F-15 Eagle | United States / Japan | Conversion trainer | F-15DJ | 44 | licensed produced by Mitsubishi |
| F-35 Lightning II | United States | Multirole | F-35A/B | 47 | 1+98* on order |
| Mitsubishi F-2 | Japan | Multirole | F-2A | 62 | based on the Lockheed Martin F-16 |
| Mitsubishi F-2 | Japan | Conversion trainer | F-2B | 23 | based on the Lockheed Martin F-16 |
AWACS
| Boeing E-767 | United States | AEW&C | | 4 | |
| E-2 Hawkeye | United States | AEW&C | E-2C/D | 20 | 7 on order |
Reconnaissance
| Kawasaki C-2 | Japan | Reconnaissance | RC-2 | 1 | + 2 on order< |
Electronic warfare
| Kawasaki C-1 | Japan | Electronic warfare | EC-1 | 1 | retired in 2025 along with the C-1 |
| NAMC YS-11 | Japan | Electronic warfare | | 3 | retired in 2021 |
Tanker
| Boeing KC-767 | United States | Aerial refueling | KC-767J | 4 | |
| Boeing KC-46 Pegasus | United States | Aerial refueling / Transport | KC-46A | 4 | 2 on order |
| Lockheed Martin KC-130 | United States | Aerial refueling | KC-130H | 2 | |
Transport
| Boeing 777 | United States | VIP transport | 777-300ER | 2 | call sign Japanese Air Force One |
| Hawker 800 | United Kingdom | SAR / Transport | U-125A | 25 | |
| Kawasaki C-2 | Japan | Transport | | 15 | 4 on order |
| Lockheed C-130 Hercules | United States | Transport | C-130H | 14 | |
| Gulfstream IV | United States | Flight inspection | | 5 | |
| British Aerospace 125 | United Kingdom | Flight inspection | | 2 | |
| Cessna Citation Latitude | United States | Flight inspection / Utility | | 2 | 1 on order |
Helicopters
| Boeing CH-47 Chinook | United States | Transport / Utility | CH-47J | 17 | Licensed built by Kawasaki Heavy Industries. 5 on order. |
| Sikorsky UH-60 Black Hawk | United States | SAR / Utility | UH-60J | 61 | Licensed built by Mitsubishi. 13 on order. |
Trainer aircraft
| Fuji T-7 | Japan | Light trainer | | 49 | |
| Hawker 400 | United States | Jet trainer | T-1 Jayhawk | 13 | |
| Kawasaki T-4 | Japan | Jet trainer | | 178 | |
| T-6 Texan II | United States | Light trainer | | 0 | 36 on order |
UAV
| RQ-4 Global Hawk | United States | Surveillance | RQ-4B | 1 | 2 on order |

==== Future aircraft ====
Japan is part of the Global Combat Air Programme that aims to put a replacement for the F-2 in service around the mid-2030s.

Japan has unveiled a plan to enhance its future military equipment, focusing on acquiring additional RC-2 aircraft for command, control, and signal intelligence missions. The plan also includes developing a stand-off electronic warfare aircraft to boost electromagnetic warfare and network capabilities. Additionally, Japan aims to strengthen its unmanned aircraft fleet for intelligence gathering and combat missions.

Japan plans to order 1 RC-2 aircraft with the 2024 budget.

Japan plans to order 4 C-2 SOJ electronic warfare aircraft to replace the EC-1 fleet.

Japan selected the T-6JP Texan II trainer aircraft to replace their Fuji T-7s. An unspecified number are to be ordered.

Kawasaki T-4s are expected to be replaced by 2030 with a new advanced trainer. Contenders for this contract include the Boeing-Saab T-7 Red Hawk, Alenia Aermacchi M-346 Master, and the Mitsubishi T-X Trainer Concept.

==== Detailed F-35 orders ====
| Fiscal year | Budget (¥ billion) | F-35 yearly procurement | | Notes |
| Fiscal year | Budget (¥ billion) | F-35A | F-35B | Notes |
| Target total | – | 105 | 42 | 147 planned |
| 2027 | ¥ 0 | – | – | |
| 2027 | ¥ 0 | – | – | |
| 2026 | ¥ 149.30 | 8 | – | |
| 2026 | ¥ 72.50 | – | 3 | |
| 2025 | ¥ 138.70 | 8 | – | |
| 2025 | ¥ 66.50 | – | 3 | |
| 2024 | ¥ 112.00 | 8 | – | |
| 2024 | ¥ 128.20 | – | 7 | |
| 2023 | ¥ 106.90 | 8 | – | |
| 2023 | ¥ 143.50 | – | 8 | |
| 2022 | ¥ 76.80 | 8 | – | |
| 2022 | ¥ 51.00 | – | 4 | |
| 2021 | ¥ 39.10 | 4 | – | |
| 2021 | ¥ 25.90 | – | 2 | |
| 2020 | ¥ 28.10 | 3 | – | |
| 2020 | ¥ 79.30 | – | 6 | |
| 2019 | ¥ 68.10 | 6 | – | |
| 2018 | ¥ 78.50 | 6 | – | |
| 2017 | ¥ 88.00 | 6 | – | |
| 2016 | ¥ 108.40 | 6 | – | |
| 2015 | ¥ 103.20 | 6 | – | |
| 2014 | ¥ 63.80 | 4 | – | |
| 2013 | ¥ 29.90 | 2 | – | |
| 2012 | ¥ 39.50 | 4 | – | |
| Total | ¥ 1,797.29 (+ ¥ 0.00) | 87 (+ 0) | 33 (+ 0) | – |
| Total | ¥ 1,797.29 (+ ¥ 0.00) | 120 (+ 0) | | – |

Targeted number of vehicles
Budget request

== Culture and traditions ==
=== JASDF flag ===
The Japan Air Self-Defense Force flag was first adopted in 1955 after the JASDF was created in 1954. It is based on a cap badge made in 1954. The flag is cobalt blue with a gold winged eagle on top of a combined star, the moon, the Hinomaru sun disc and clouds. The latest version of the JASDF flag was re-adopted on 19 March 2001. The JASDF flag is different from the JSDF flag and the JGSDF flag. It is determined by a directive regarding the flags of the JSDF.

=== Food ===
The dish of the JASDF is deep-fried chicken karaage, such as Okinawan-style deep-fried chicken. The JASDF tried to increase its popularity by promoting its fried chicken recipe since 2018. There were competitions between the JMSDF's popular curry.

== See also ==
- Fighter units of the Japan Air Self-Defense Force
- Japan Maritime Self-Defense Force aviation
- J/FPS-5
