= Southwestern Air Command Support Flight (JASDF) =

- 南西部航空方面隊支援飛行班
- Country: Japan
- Branch: Japan Air Self-Defense Force
- Part of: 9th Air Wing Southwestern Air Defense Force
- Garrison/HQ: Naha Air Base

Aircraft flown
- Trainer: Kawasaki T-4

The Southwestern Air Command Support Flight (南西部航空方面隊支援飛行班, minami-seibu-kōkūhōmentai-shien-hikō-han) is a unit of the Japan Air Self-Defense Force based at Naha Air Base in Okinawa Prefecture. Under the authority of the Southwestern Air Defense Force, the flight operates Kawasaki T-4 aircraft.
