= Tactical Fighter Training Group (JASDF) =

Air Development and Test Wing
- 飛行教導群(hikoukyoudougun)
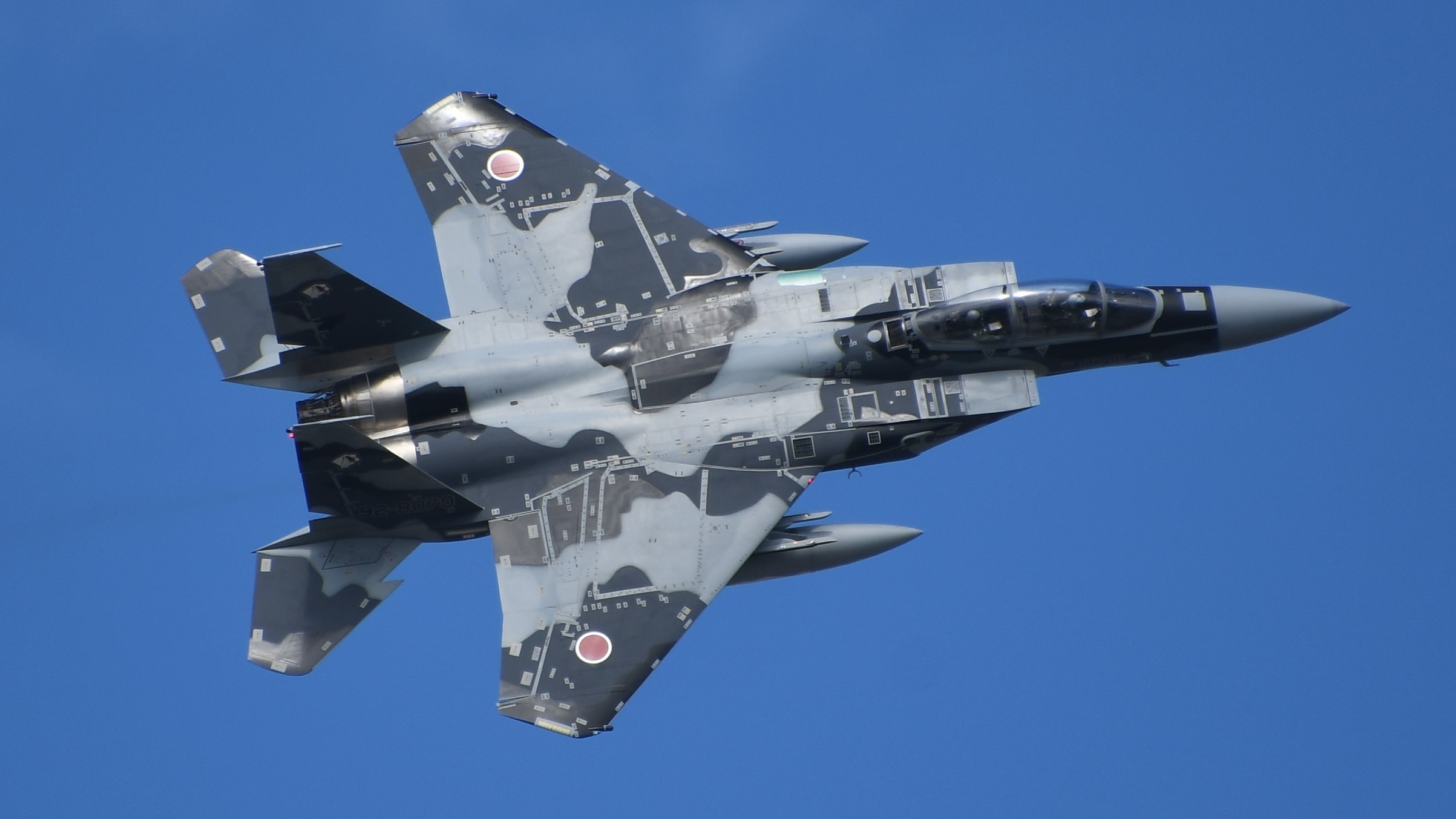
- F-15DJ #92-8070 of the Tactical Fighter Training Group (2018)
- Active: December 17, 1981
- Country: Japan
- Allegiance: Air Tactics Development Wing
- Branch: Japan Air Self-Defense Force
- Garrison/HQ: Komatsu Air Base

The Tactical Fighter Training Group (飛行教導群, hikoukyoudougun) is the aggressor unit of the Air Tactics Development Wing of the Japan Air Self-Defense Force based at Komatsu Air Base in Ishikawa Prefecture, Japan.

== Aircraft operated ==
=== Aggressor ===
- Mitsubishi T-2 (1981–1990)
- Mitsubishi F-15J/DJ (1990–present)

=== Trainer ===
- Lockheed T-33A (1981–1992)
- Kawasaki T-4 (1992–present)
