= Northern Air Command Support Flight (JASDF) =

Military unit of the Japanese Air Self-Defense Force

- 北部航空方面隊支援飛行班
- Country: Japan
- Branch: Japan Air Self-Defense Force
- Part of: 北部航空方面隊
- Garrison/HQ: Misawa Air Base

Aircraft flown
- Trainer helicopter: Kawasaki T-4

The Northern Air Command Support Flight (北部航空方面隊支援飛行班, hokubu-kōkūhōmentai-shien-hikō-han) is a unit of the Japan Air Self-Defense Force based at Misawa Air Base in Aomori Prefecture. Under the authority of the Northern Air Defense Force, the flight operates Kawasaki T-4 aircraft.
