= 13th Flight Training Wing (JASDF) =

13th Flying Training Wing
- 第13飛行教育団
- Active: June 1, 1959
- Country: Japan
- Branch: Japan Air Self-Defense Force
- Part of: Air Training Command
- Garrison/HQ: Ashiya Air Base

Aircraft flown
- Trainer: Kawasaki T-4

The 13th Flying Training Wing (第13飛行教育団, dai-13-hikō-kyōiku-dan)) also sometimes known as the 13th Flight Training Wing is a wing of the Japan Air Self-Defense Force. It comes under the authority of Air Training Command and is based at Ashiya Air Base in Fukuoka Prefecture.

It has two squadrons, both equipped with Kawasaki T-4 aircraft:

- 1st Flight Training Squadron
- 2nd Flight Training Squadron
