= 303rd Tactical Fighter Squadron (JASDF) =

- 第303飛行隊
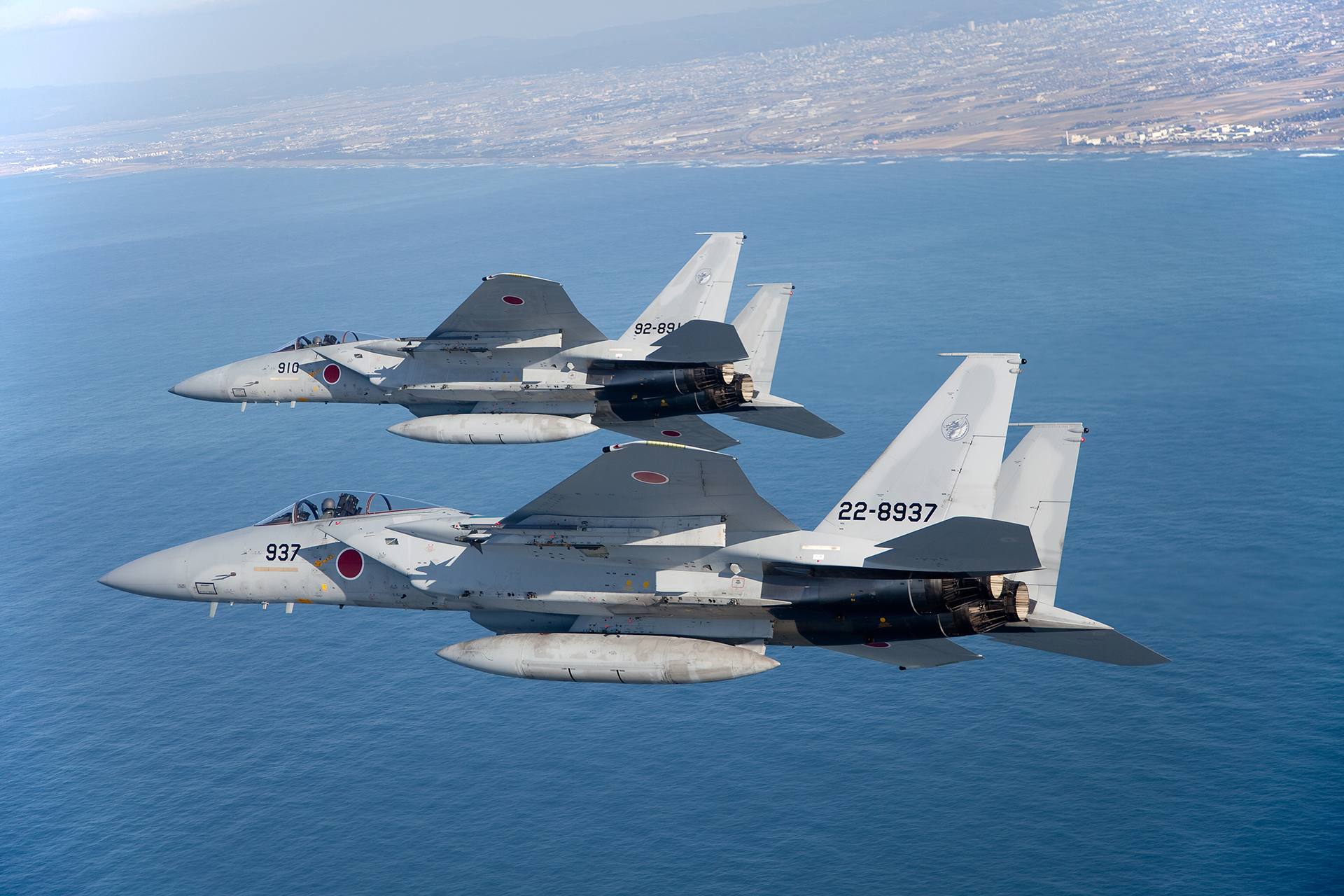
- 303 Squadron Mitsubishi F-15Js
- Active: October 26, 1976–present
- Country: Japan
- Branch: Japan Air Self-Defense Force
- Part of: Central Air Defense Force, 6th Air Wing
- Garrison/HQ: Komatsu Air Base
- Nickname: "Fighting dragon"

Aircraft flown
- Fighter: Mitsubishi F-15J/DJ
- Trainer: Kawasaki T-4

The 303rd Tactical Fighter Squadron (第303飛行隊 (dai-sann-byaku-sann-hikoutai)) is a squadron of the 6th Air Wing of the Japan Air Self-Defense Force (JSDF) based at Komatsu Air Base, in Ishikawa Prefecture, Japan. It is equipped with Mitsubishi F-15J/DJ and Kawasaki T-4 aircraft.

== History ==
The squadron was formed as the third of the JASDF's McDonnell Douglas F-4EJ Phantom II squadrons. It replaced the 4th Squadron, which had been equipped with North American F-86F Sabres, and was formed using some of the personnel from the 4th squadron. At the time the JASDF's squadron numbering system was dependent on the aircraft model used. There was a gap between the disbanding of the 4th and the founding of the 303rd due to discussions with the local community near the base about the F-4s being based there.

On June 17, 1977, the squadron began quick reaction alert (QRA) flights. There were many intercepts of the regular "Tokyo Express" flights by Soviet aircraft such as Tupolev Tu-95 and Myasishchev M-4 bombers over the Sea of Japan. Some of them were transiting to or from the Soviet Union's Cam Ranh Base in southern Vietnam. During a QRA on June 27, 1980, a Tu-16 Badger of the Soviet Air Force on a Tokyo Express flight crashed near Komatsu Air Base in Ishikawa Prefecture in the Sea of Japan. There were no survivors. The remains of three crew members were recovered by the Japanese Maritime Self-Defense Force ship Nemuro.

On December 1, 1987, the squadron re-equipped with F-15J/DJ aircraft. It was the first F-4 squadron to re-equip with the F-15. Unlike many JASDF fighter squadrons, it has been located at the same base for its entire existence.

On 22 November 1995 F-15J 02-8919 flown by Lieutenant Tatsumi Higuchi was shot down by an AIM-9L Sidewinder missile accidentally fired by his wingman during air-intercept training over the Sea of Japan. The pilot ejected safely.

The squadron participated in the US military exercise Cope North in Guam in 2000 and in the exercise Red Flag - Alaska in 2009, 2011 and 2012. During the 2011 exercise it carried out bilateral exercises with the Royal Australian Air Force (RAAF) for the first time, flying with McDonnell Douglas F/A-18 Hornets of the RAAF's No. 3 Squadron.

In July 2018 aircraft of the squadron trained in Japanese airspace with US B-52 bombers.

== Tail markings ==
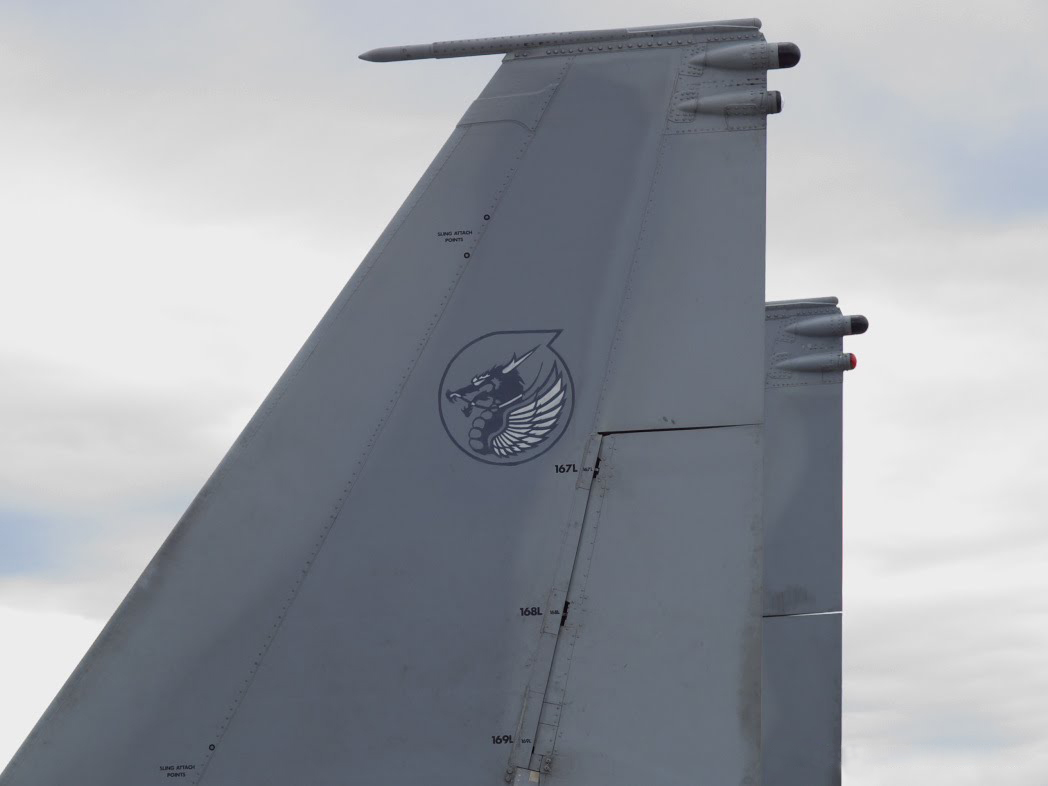
Tail marking (2010)

Originally the squadron's tail marking was of the 6th Air Wing's red, white and blue marking. In 1981 the tail marking changed to be that of a dragon inside a stylized "6". The squadron's call sign is "dragon", and in addition the dragon depicted in the tail marking is said to be the protector of Mount Haku, which is not far from the base.

== In popular culture ==
The squadron appeared in the 1993 anime film Patlabor 2: The Movie, the 2004 video game Drakengard, the 2006 anime series Yomigaeru Sora – Rescue Wings and the 2007 film Midnight Eagle.

== Aircraft operated ==
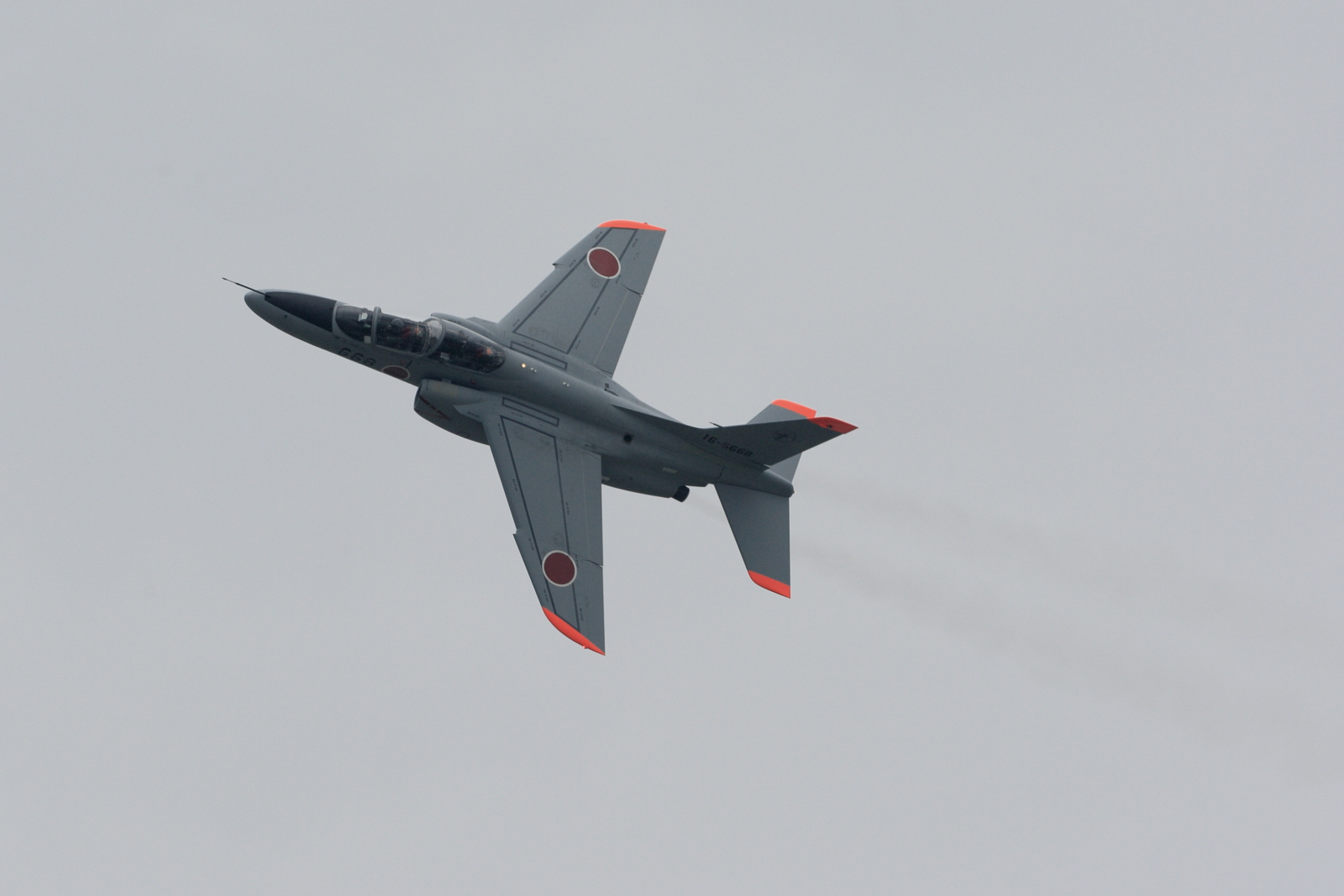
303 Sqn Kawasaki T-4 (2012)

=== Fighter aircraft ===
- McDonnell Douglas F-4EJ Phantom II (1976–1987)
- Mitsubishi F-15J (1987–present)
- Mitsubishi F-35A Lightning II (2025–present)

=== Liaison aircraft ===
- Lockheed T-33A (1976–1994)
- Kawasaki T-4 (1992–present)

== See also ==
- Fighter units of the Japan Air Self-Defense Force
