= Central Air Command Support Squadron (JASDF) =

- 中部航空方面隊司令部支援飛行隊
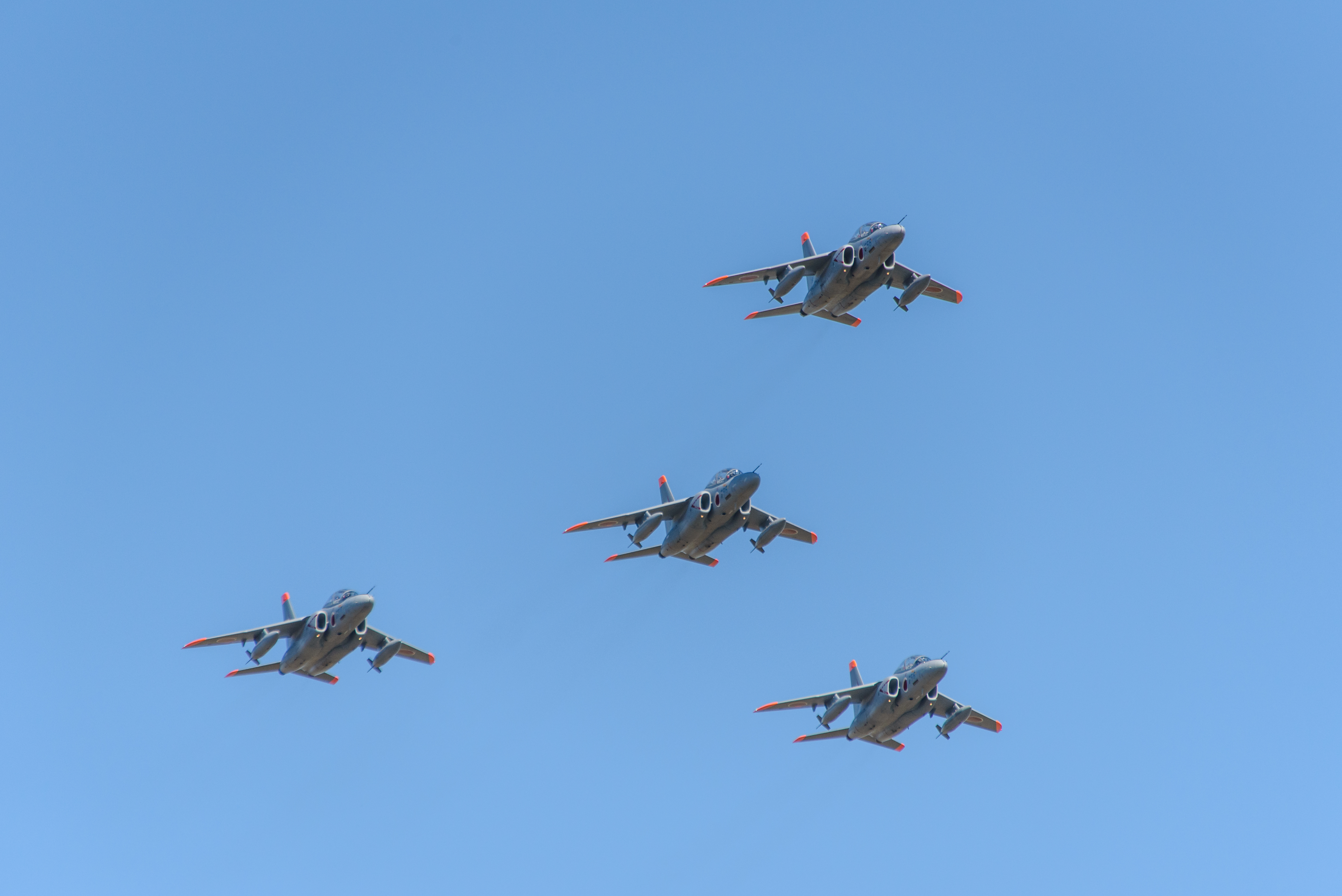
- Squadron Kawasaki T-4s (2015)
- Country: Japan
- Branch: Japan Air Self-Defense Force
- Part of: Central Air Defense Force
- Garrison/HQ: Iruma Air Base

Aircraft flown
- Trainer helicopter: Kawasaki T-4
- Transport: U-4

Central Air Command Support Squadron (中部航空方面隊司令部支援飛行隊, chūbu-kōkūhōmentai-shirei-bu-shien-hikō-tai) is a squadron of the Japan Air Self-Defense Force based at Iruma Air Base in Saitama Prefecture north of Tokyo. Under the authority of the Central Air Defense Force, the squadron operates Kawasaki T-4 and U-4 aircraft.

There is a "Silver Impulse" T-4 acrobatic team that performs during the annual Iruma Air Show. The name is derived from the official JASDF aerobatic team, Blue Impulse, and the fact that most of the pilots are aged 50 or over.

== Tail markings ==
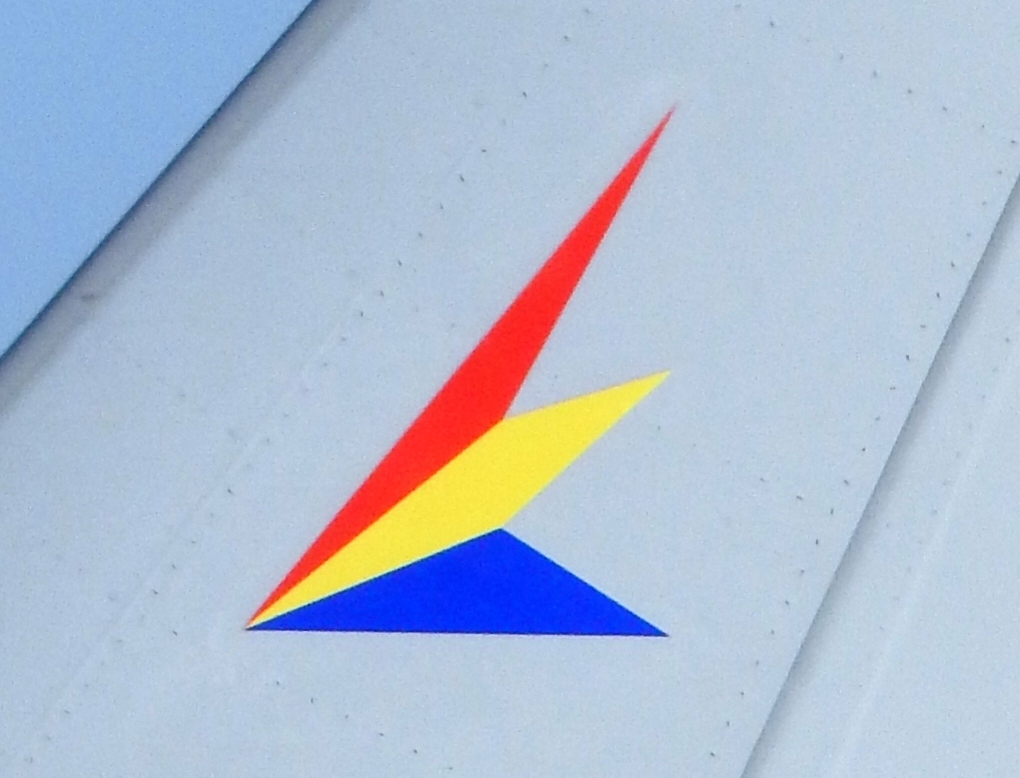
Tail markings (2016)

The squadron's aircraft tail markings are an arrow shape made of red, yellow and blue lines.

== Aircraft operated ==
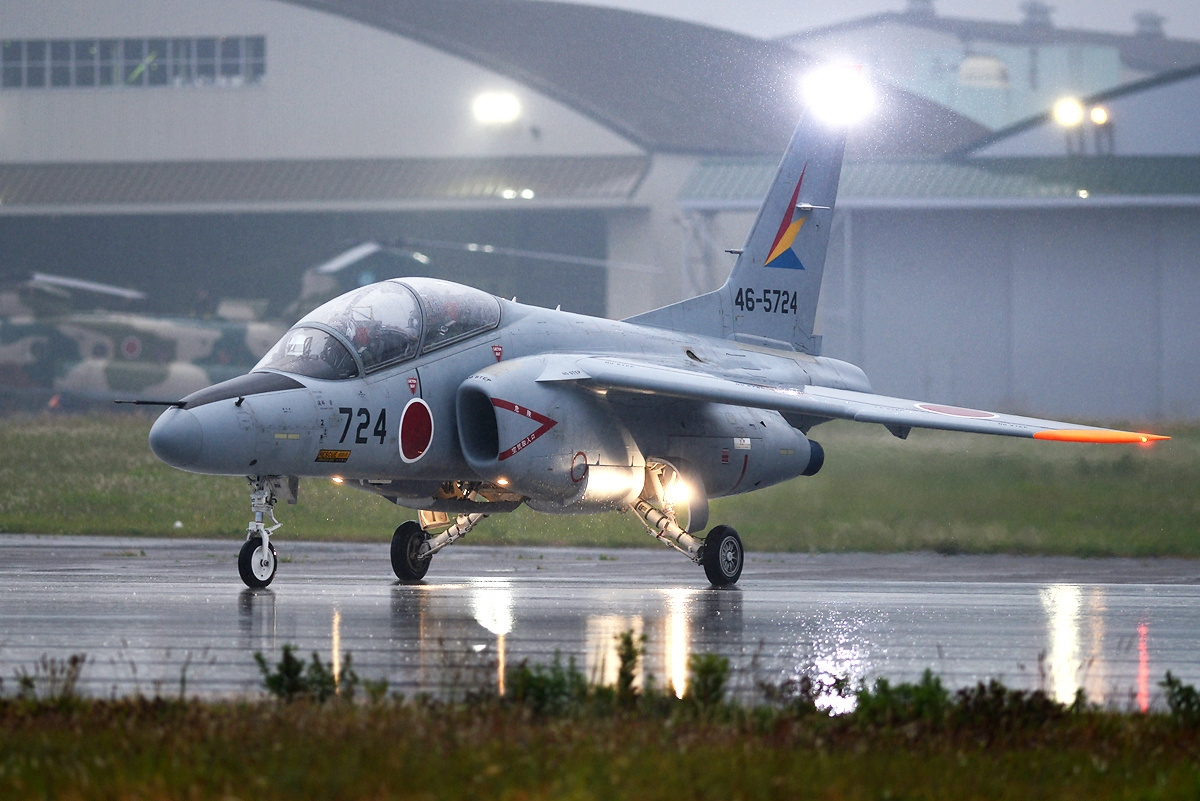
Kawasaki T-4 (2013)

- Beechcraft Queen Air 65 (replaced by U-4)
- Kawasaki T-4
- U-4
