= Ashiya Air Base =

Ashiya Air Field
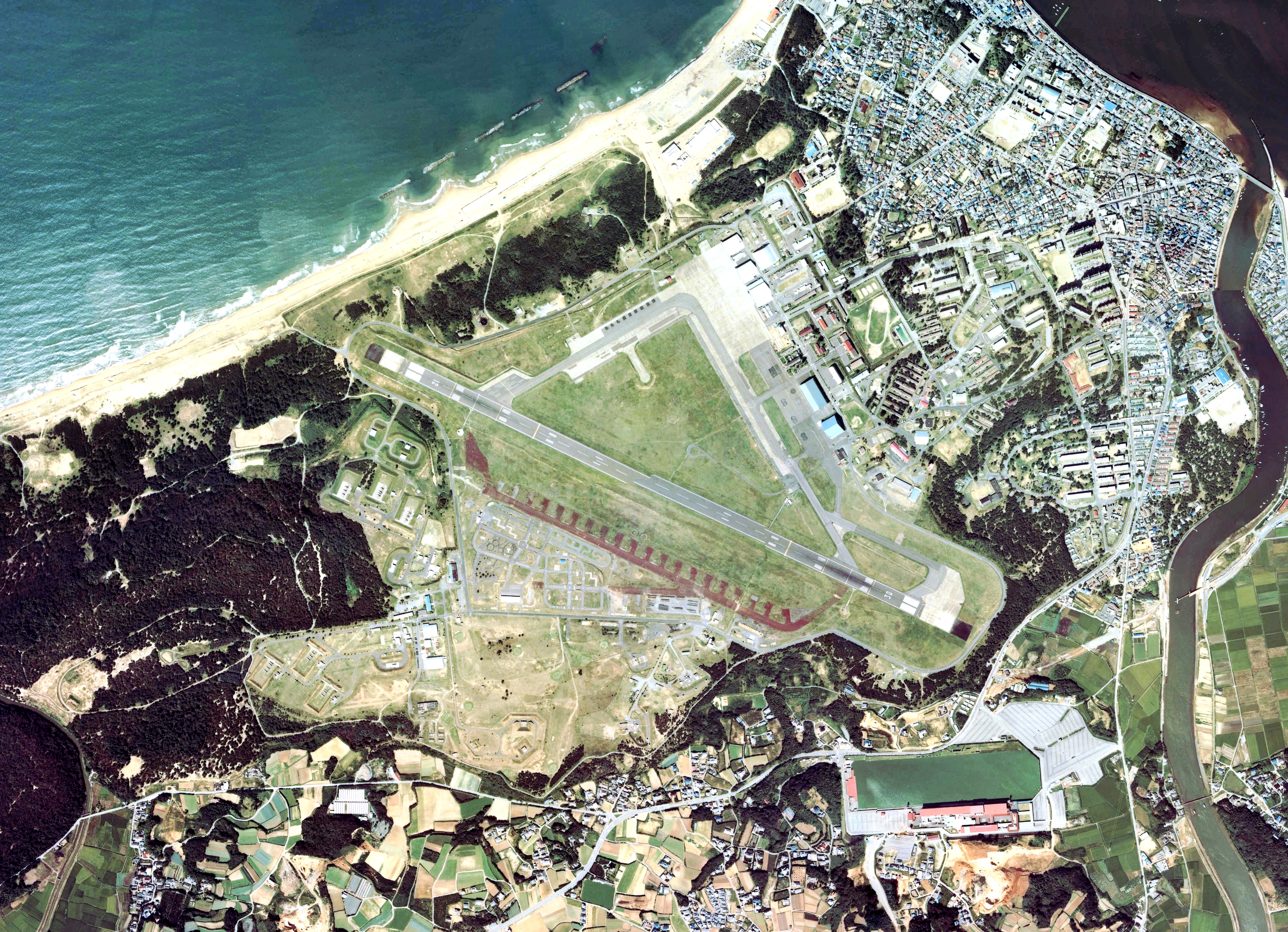
- Aerial Photograph of Ashiya Air Field
- IATA: none; ICAO: RJFA

Summary
- Airport type: Military
- Operator: Japan Air Self-Defense Force
- Location: Ashiya, Japan
- Elevation AMSL: 98 ft / 30 m
- Coordinates: 33°52′53″N 130°39′06″E

Map
- Location in Japan

Runways
| Direction | Length | | Surface |
| Direction | m | ft | Surface |
|---|---|---|---|
| 12/30 | 1,640 | 5,381 | Concrete |
- Source: Japanese AIP at AIS Japan

Ashiya Air Base (芦屋基地, Ashiya Kichi) (ICAO: RJFA) is a military installation of the Japan Air Self-Defense Force. It is located 0.5 NM (0.93 km; 0.58 mi) north of Ashiya in the Fukuoka Prefecture, Japan.

== History ==
Ashiya Air Base was established as a Japanese Army Air Force facility in 1944 and was used primarily as a defensive airfield, launching (Nakajima Ki-84) fighter interceptors against attacking USAAF B-29 Superfortress bombers.

Taken over in October 1945 by the occupying American forces, it was turned into a salvage/scrapping facility by the USAAF 92d Air Service Squadron to destroy former Japanese military aircraft and other equipment. Attacked on several occasions during the war, it was repaired for Fifth Air Force use as an occupation facility. The 85th Airdrome Squadron assumed control of the station on 3 April 1946, with Headquarters, 315th Bombardment Wing moving into the facility on 20 May.

On 20 May 1946, the air base was reactivated for operational use by the then-U.S. Army Air Forces, with the 8th Fighter Group moving to Ashiya from Fukuoka Airfield, operating P-51D Mustangs. During the postwar Occupation Era, a series of U.S. Army Air Forces and later U.S. Air Force units were assigned:

- 8th Fighter Group, 20 May 1946-25 Mar 1949 (P-51D Mustang)
- 475th Fighter Group, 25 Mar-1 Apr 1949 (P-51D Mustang)
- 347th Fighter Group, 6 May 1949-1 Apr 1950 (F-82G Twin Mustang)

With the eruption of the Korean War in June 1950, combat missions over South Korea were flown from Ashiya by the USAF's 35th and 18th Fighter Groups, with first-generation F-80 Shooting Star jet fighters. In July, the 35th moved to Pohang Airfield (K-3), South Korea, being replaced by the 18th. When Pusan East (K-9) Air Base was ready in September, the group also moved to the forward base.

The comparatively short runway at the airfield was not well-suited for jet fighter operations, and the distance from the combat areas stretched the endurance of the early tactical jets. When the 18th Fighter Group moved out in September 1950, Ashiya became a transport base, with C-54 Skymaster and C-119 Flying Boxcars operated from the airfield. Both during the Korean War and in its aftermath, a series of Far East Air Force troop carrier groups were assigned:

- 314th Troop Carrier Group, 1 Sep 1950-15 Nov 1954
- 61st Troop Carrier Group, 10 Dec 1950-26 Mar 1952
- 403d Troop Carrier Group, 14 Apr 1952-1 Jan 1953
- 483d Troop Carrier Group, 1 Jan 1953-25 Jun 1960
- 316th Troop Carrier Group, 15 Nov 1954-15 Jun 1957

From 1952 to 1957, the 3d Air Rescue Group's 39th Air Rescue Squadron also operated USAF Air Rescue Service SC-47 Skytrain land-based aircraft, SA-16 Albatross amphibious aircraft, and SH-19 Chickasaw helicopters from Ashiya AB in a search and rescue role. This was chronicled in the 1959 fiction novel by Elliott Arnold entitled Flight from Ashiya and the 1964 film of the same name.

In 1960, the United States closed Ashiya Air Base and returned to the Japanese government, citing the need for additional USAF forces in Europe and budget restrictions.

== Organization ==
Ashiya Air Base provides pilot flight training for the Japan Air Self-Defense Force. It reports to the JASDF Air Training Command, headquartered at Hamamatsu Air Base.

- 13th Flying Training Wing
  - 1st Flight Training Squadron (Kawasaki T-4)
  - 2nd Flight Training Squadron (Kawasaki T-4)
- Air Rescue Wing Ashiya Detachment

== See also ==
- Flight from Ashiya
