= Kawasaki T-4 =

Japanese jet trainer aircraft

T-4
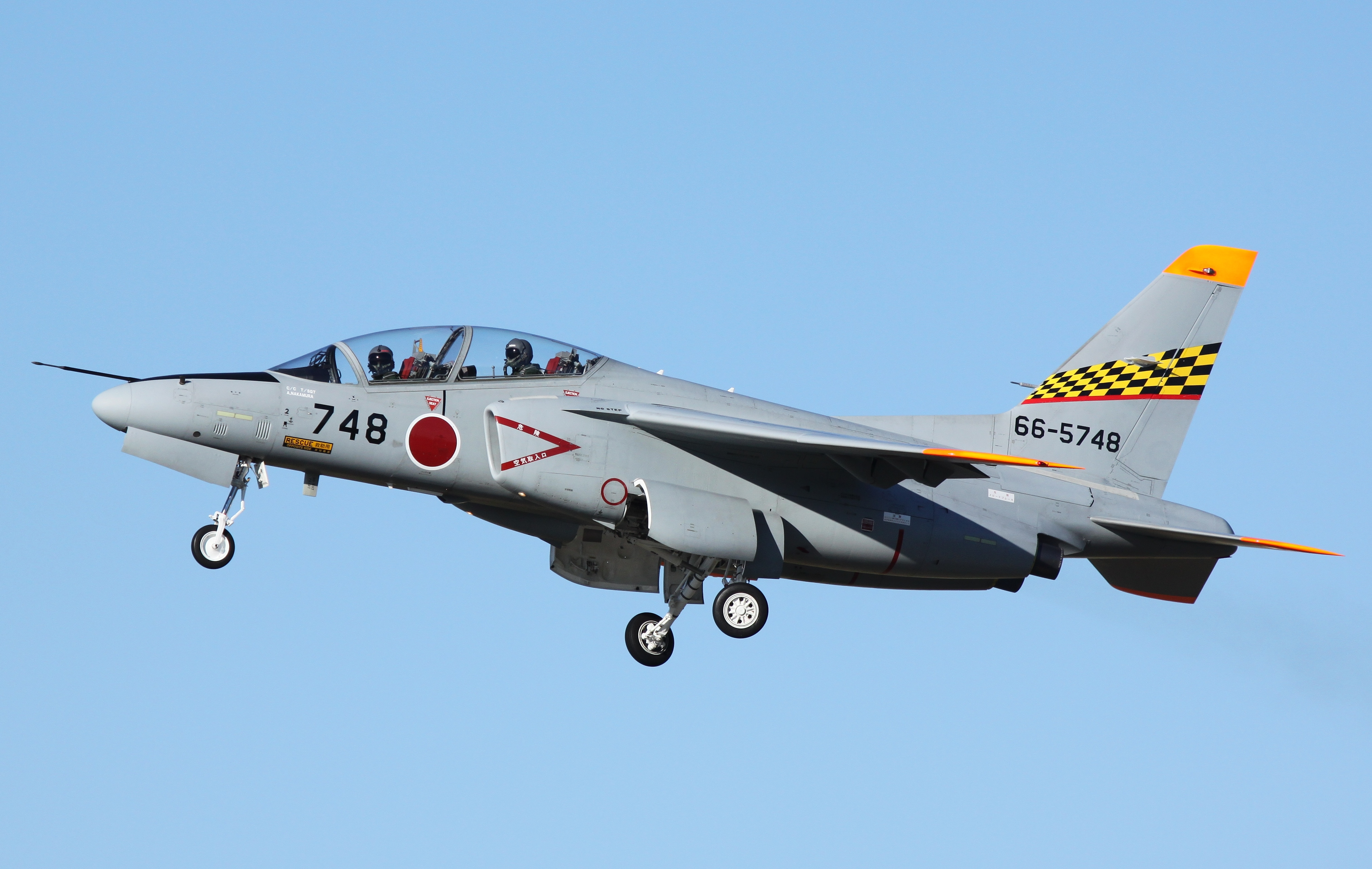
- Kawasaki T-4 landing at Hamamatsu (2010)

General information
- Type: Intermediate trainer aircraft
- National origin: Japan
- Manufacturer: Kawasaki
- Status: Active
- Primary user: Japan Air Self-Defense Force

History
- Manufactured: 208+
- Introduction date: 1988
- First flight: 29 July 1985

The Kawasaki T-4 is a Japanese subsonic intermediate jet trainer aircraft developed and manufactured by the commercial conglomerate Kawasaki Heavy Industries. Its sole operator is the Japan Air Self-Defense Force (JASDF), in part due to historic restrictions on the exporting of military hardware. In addition to its primary training mission, the T-4 has been used by the JASDF's Blue Impulse aerobatic team as well as liaison duties with most fighter units. The first XT-4 prototype flew on 29 July 1985, while the first production aircraft was delivered during September 1988.

== Development ==
=== Origins ===
During November 1981, Kawasaki was selected as the main contractor to design and manufacture a suitable trainer aircraft, which was initially designated as the KA-850, to meet the needs of Japan's MT-X program, having beaten out rival bids from Mitsubishi and Fuji. The MT-X program had been launched to procure a replacement for the aging Lockheed T-33 and Fuji T-1 jet trainer aircraft then in service in the Japan Air Self Defense Force (JASDF). Furthermore, there was also a desire for the prospective trainer aircraft to take over some of the syllabus that was being handled by the contemporary Mitsubishi T-2, a supersonic trainer and basis of the Mitsubishi F-1 fighter aircraft. The initial program planned for a production run of 220 aircraft and an entry into service date of 1988.

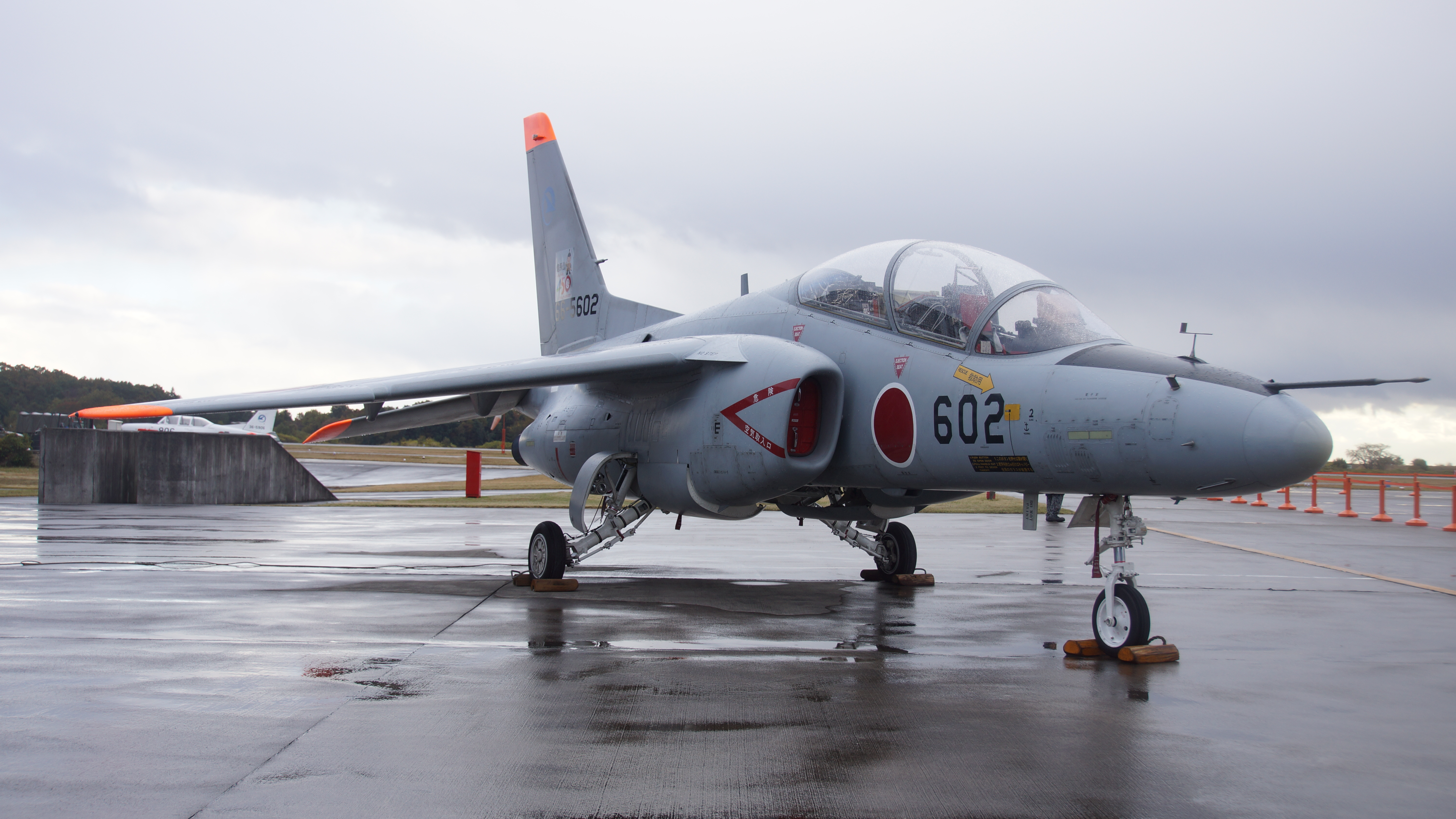
A T-4 at Gifu Air Field

Kawasaki's design team was headed by the aeronautics engineer Kohki Isozaki, as well as working in close conjunction with planners at the Japanese defense agency. The design produced by Kawasaki had to satisfy aspects of the JASDF's training regime that was previously performed by multiple aircraft. As such, the type had to demonstrate a range of transonic aerodynamic effects, as well as achieving a high level of manoeuvrability, a relatively-low operating cost, and high reliability levels. Easy handling was also required so that trainees could convert from the piston-engined Fuji T-3 after accumulating only 70 flying hours. Furthermore, the economics for operating the type was to be comparable to the leading international competitors at that time.

The design had to incorporate other political desires as well; there was a great value placed upon powering the type with the first all-Japanese production turbofan engine, the Ishikawajima-Harima F3-IHI-30. Reportedly, the selection of a twin-engine configuration for the trainer was one of the easiest decisions taken, being made not just for engine power but from a high priority being placed upon safety. A robust, damage-tolerant and long-lived structure was also specified for the trainer; in order to achieve this, it was decided to make limited use of composite materials in the form of carbon fiber and kevlar in areas such as the radome and elements of the rear wing, tail unit, and undercarriage. Extensive use of computer-aided design (CAD) and computer-aided manufacturing (CAM) techniques was also applied. These advances contributed to the design being certified for a total lifespan of 7,500 flight hours.

Out of these efforts emerged the T-4, a clean-sheet indigenously-developed trainer aircraft. According to aerospace publication Flight International, it was considered plausible for the T-4 to have been a competitive product upon the global trainer aircraft market if it had been priced appropriately, but such export opportunities were denied by a long-standing Japanese policy that forbids any military export sales. As such, there was no realistic prospect of the type being sold to overseas customers and it was developed from the outset with the understanding that the T-4 would be used only by the JASDF.

=== First flight ===
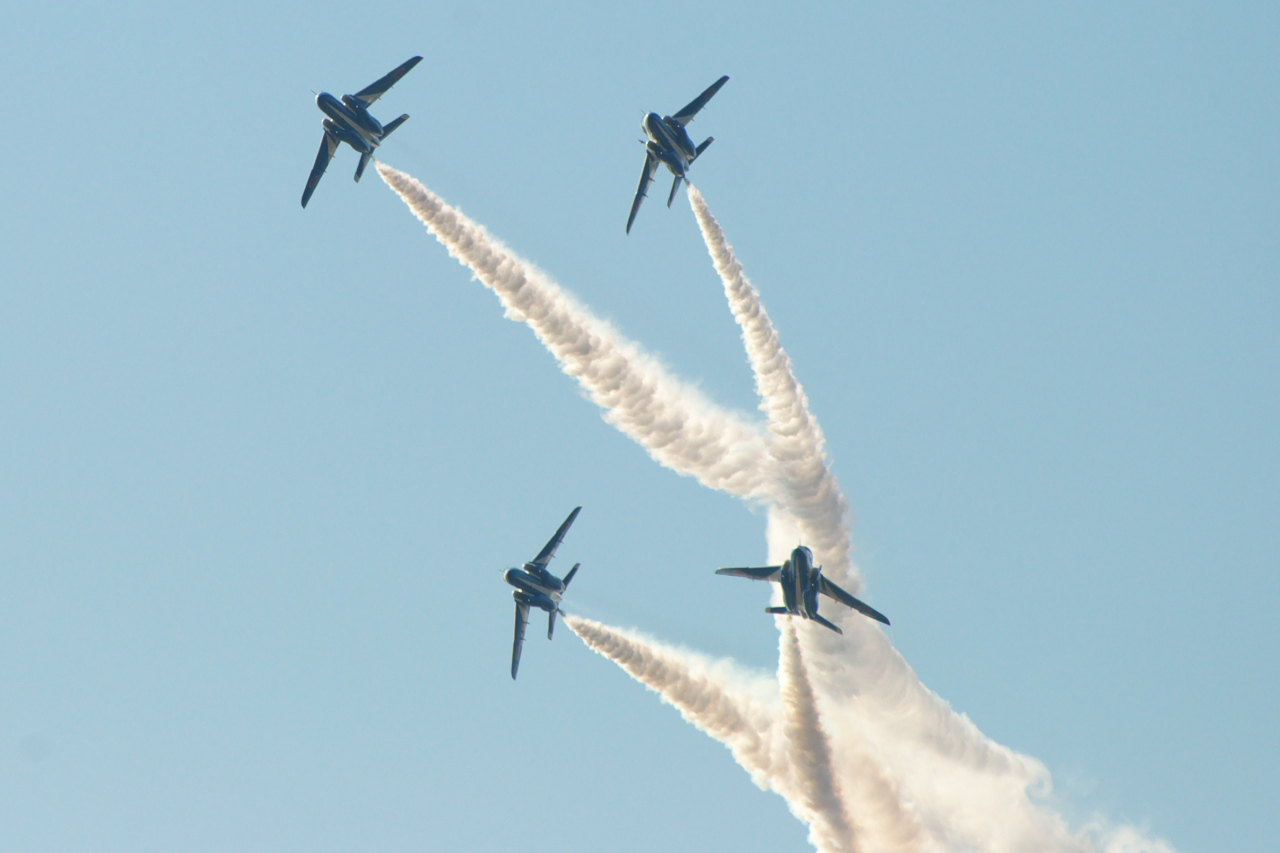
Four T-4s of the Blue Impulse aerobatic team in formation flight

On 29 July 1985, the prototype for the type, designated as the XT-4, performed its maiden flight. Reportedly, test pilots of the Air Proving Wing who flew the XT-4 observed the type to have greater subsonic manoeuvrability than the McDonnell Douglas F-15 Eagle, an agile aerial supremacy fighter. Speaking in the months before the XT-4's maiden flight, Kawaski publicly claimed that the aircraft possessed the highest performance of any subsonic trainer aircraft then available. Despite the limited availability of the F3-IHI-30 engine, it proved to be reliable, preventing any serious limitation being imposed on the wider test programme. Flight testing with the four XT-4 prototypes ended after two and a half years and roughly 500 individual flights made; in response to the feedback produced, only minor changes, such as improved brakes and refinements of the hydraulically actuated flight control system, were made.

On 28 June 1988, the first production T-4 conducted its first flight; deliveries to the JASDF began in September of that year. It was observed by Kawasaki that the programme had not only been delivered as per schedule, but both the aircraft and its Ishikawajima-Harima F3-IHI-30 powerplant had attained their respective cost targets; Flight International contrasted the T-4 against the American Fairchild T-46, a cancelled jet trainer which had cost five times as much as Kawasaki's offering without reaching production.

Manufacture of the T-4 was performed by a consortium consisting of Mitsubishi, Fuji, and Kawasaki, the latter providing leadership over the venture. A final assembly line for the type was established at Kawasaki's plant in Gifu; this line was sized to produce a maximum of two and a half aircraft per month. Originally, an eight-year production run was planned for.

=== Replacement ===
In 2021, the Government of Japan launched a study on potential replacement of T-4s.

In March 2024, Japan's Manichi newspaper published a news about Japan's government seeking for the new training jet to replace T-4s in JASDF service, which could be the Boeing–Saab T-7 Red Hawk. Japan's Acquisition, Technology & Logistics Agency (ATLA) are also looking for a replacement for Fuji T-7 fleet.

In May 2025, Mitsubishi announced that they are planning to promote the T-X to replace the T-4s.

== Design ==
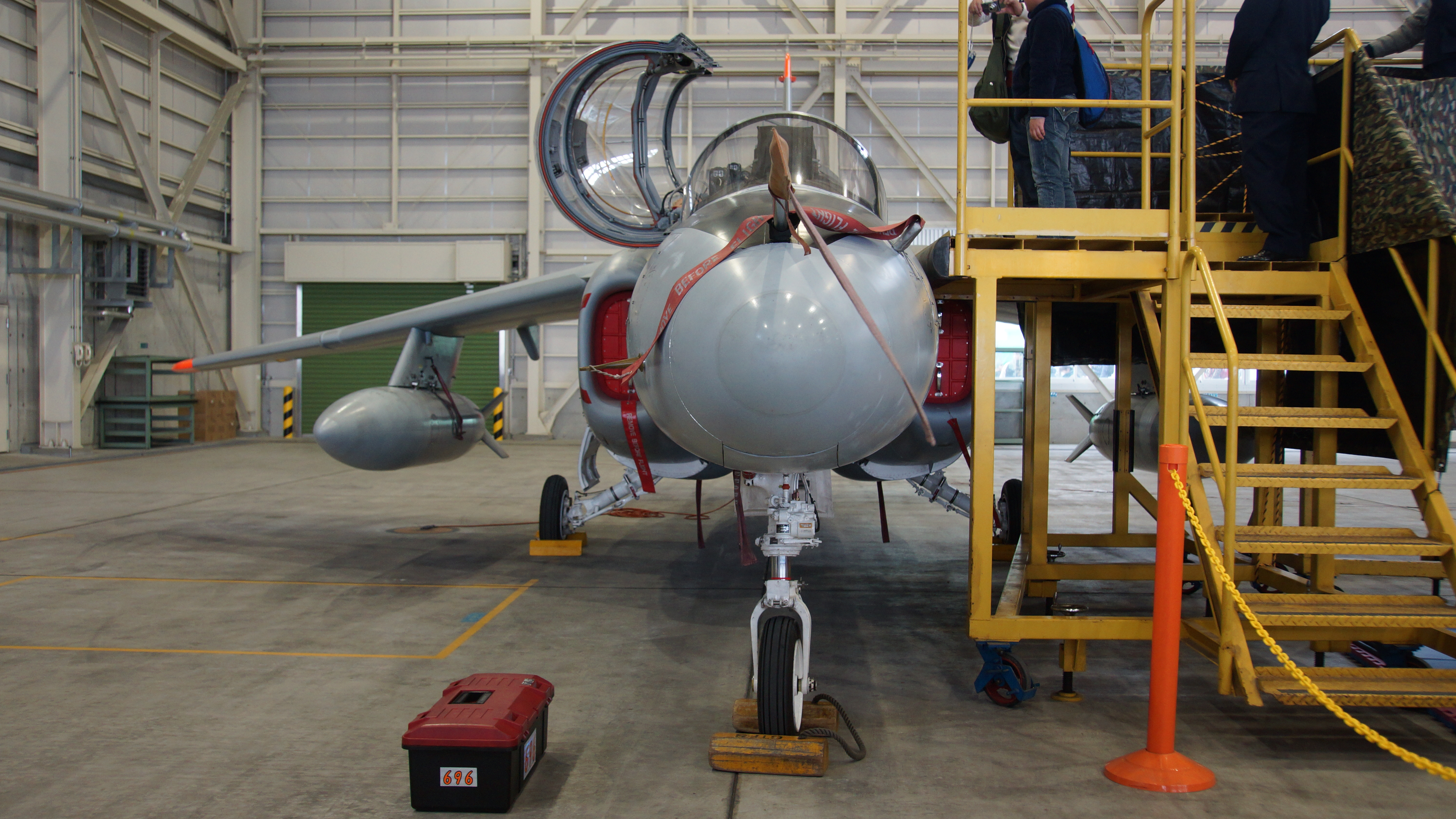
Head-on view of a T-4

The Kawasaki T-4 is a Japanese subsonic intermediate jet trainer aircraft. It is a twin-engined aircraft, being powered by pair of Ishikawajima-Harima-built F3-IHI-30 turbofan units. These engines, which were capable of generating up to 15.7 kN (3,520 lbf) of thrust, were indigenously-developed in conjunction with the T-4. Flight International observed that the performance of the T-4 was comparable with several widely exported jet trainers, such as the Franco-German Dassault/Dornier Alpha Jet and British BAE Systems Hawk. Specifically, the T-4 possessed a lower wing loading and 20 per cent greater thrust-to-weight ratio than either of these aircraft, easily permitting an initial climb to altitude rate of 3,000 m (10,000 ft) per minute. While no combat-orientated model of the aircraft has been developed to date, the standard T-4 features three hard points, enabling the installation of various air-to-air missiles, bombs, and a gun pod.

The T-4 has a sturdy, damage-tolerant airframe that is largely composed of conventional aluminium alloys, although some composite materials are also present in some areas. Its structure has sufficient strength to enable high-g manoeuvres, being rated to perform instantaneous dives of 7.33g when flown in a clean configuration. It is furnished with a thick-section transonic aerofoil, which was developed by Kawasaki and Japan's Technical Research and Development Institute (TRDI) to provide outstanding high-angle-of-attack handling and favourable spin characteristics. An unusual aerodynamic feature present on the T-4 is the compact leading-edge root extensions (LERX) just forward of its wings along the forward fuselage, these generate additional vortex lift and enhance the aircraft's high-g departure tendencies, such as the suppression of wing-drop and pitch-up during aerodynamic stalls. The use of LERX avoided any need for vortex generators.

The avionics of the T-4 are digital in nature; this approach was chosen in order to reduce both the size and weight of the avionics while also increasing their reliability. Typically, these systems and components have been indigenously produced, albeit with the incorporation of some base technologies from several American industries; examples of this include the inertial guidance system, which uses Honeywell-built ring laser gyroscopes, while the air data computer uses Sperry-supplied transducers. The majority of onboard systems are of a conventional nature; however, according to Flight International, the use of a licensed onboard oxygen generation system (OBOGS) is an unusual choice for a trainer aircraft and had required considerable effort to adapt it for use aboard the T-4. A British-sourced artificial feel system is also used by the type, the components for which being locally manufactured.

== Variants ==
- XT-4: Prototype. 4 built.
- T-4: 208 built.

== Operators ==
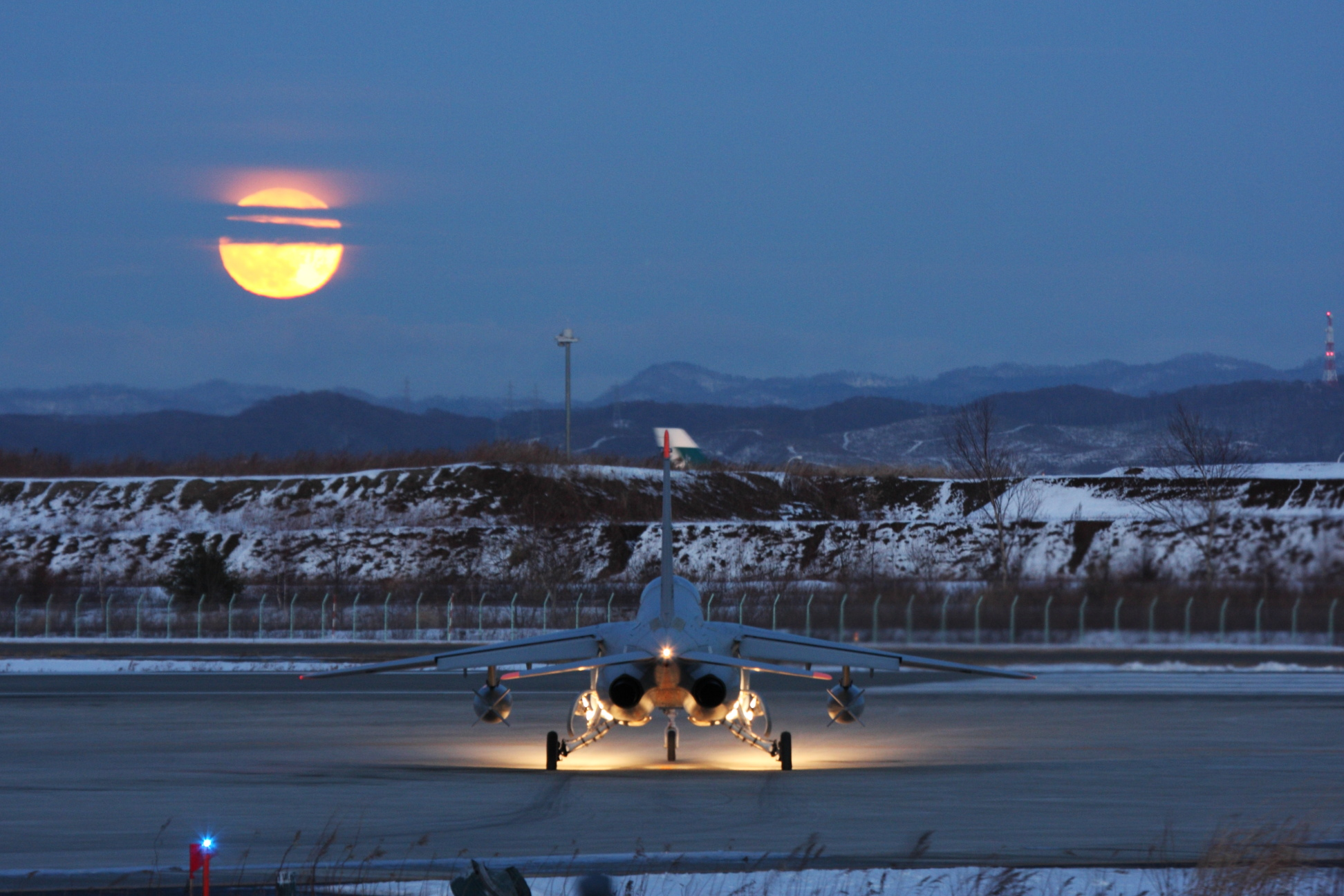
T-4 at Chitose Air Base (2013)

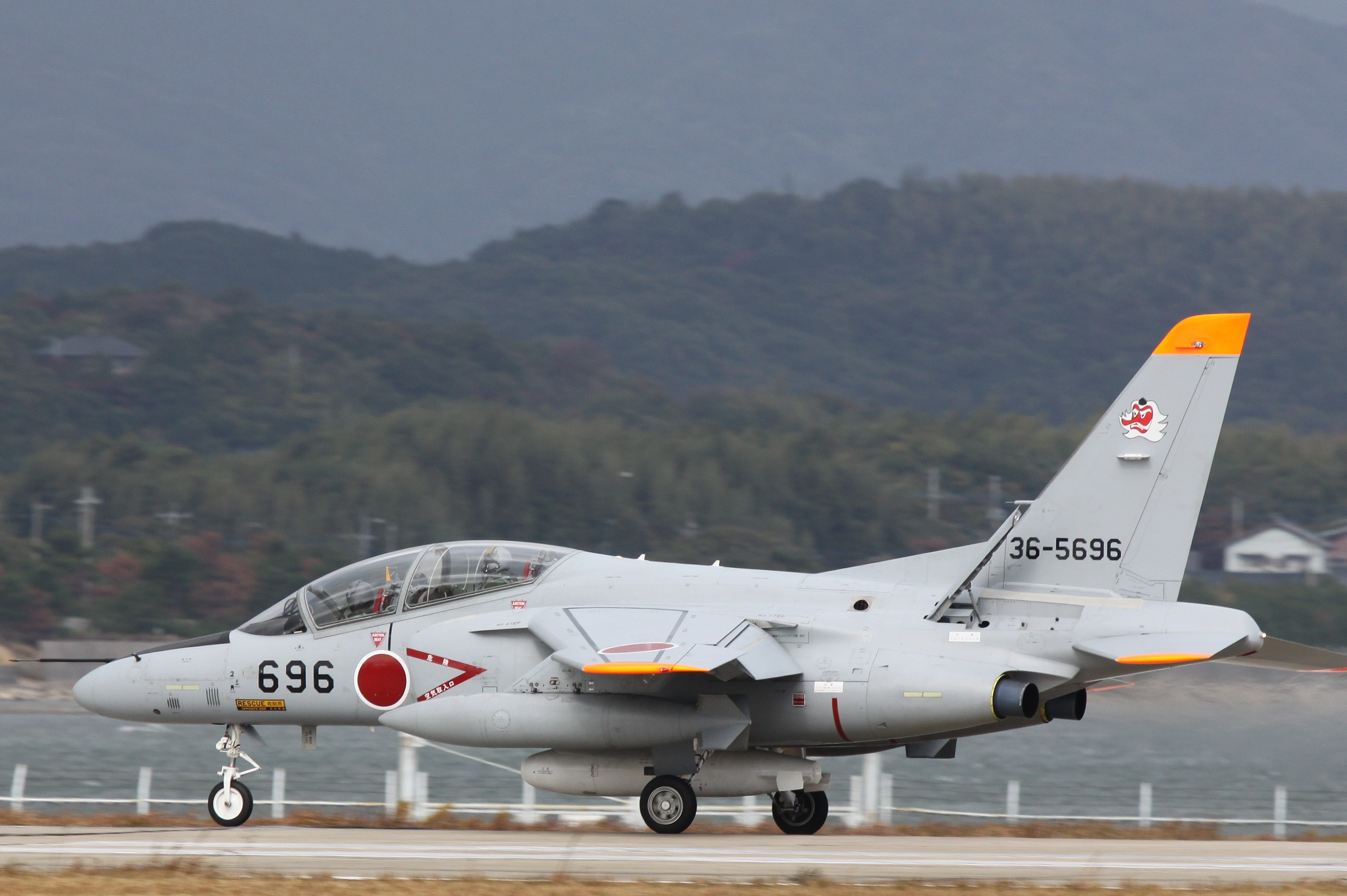
T-4 of 304th Squadron at Tsuiki Air Field (2010)

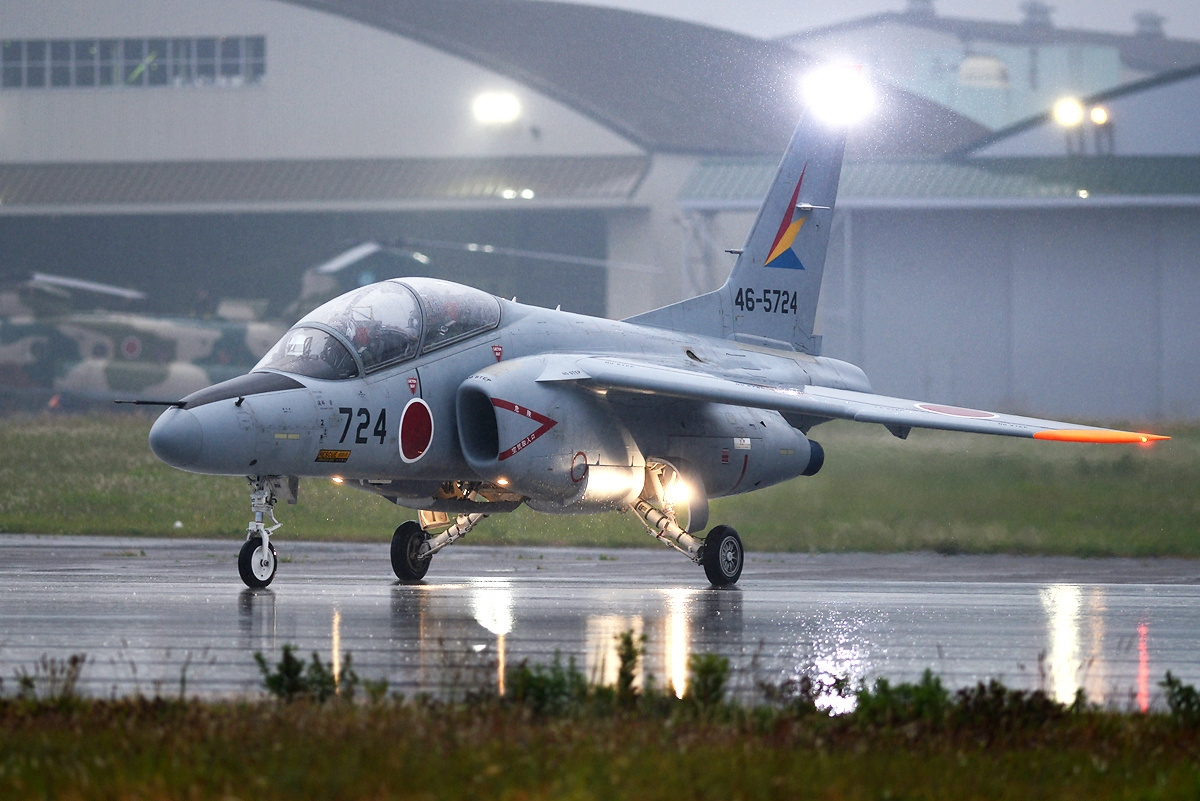
T-4 of Central Air Command Support Squadron, at Iruma Air Base (2013)

Fighter units of the Japan Air Self-Defense Force are equipped with T-4s as trainer/liaison aircraft.

Japan

- Japan Air Self-Defense Force
  - Blue Impulse (1995–present)
  - Central Air Command Support Squadron
  - Northern Air Command Support Flight
  - Southwestern Air Command Support Squadron
  - Western Air Command Support Squadron
  - Tactical Fighter Training Group
  - Air Development and Test Wing
  - 31st Training Squadron (1989–present)
  - 32nd Training Squadron (1990–present)
  - 23rd Flying Training Squadron (2000–present)
  - 3rd Tactical Fighter Squadron (1990–present)
  - 6th Tactical Fighter Squadron (1991–present)
  - 8th Tactical Fighter Squadron (1991–present)
  - 201st Tactical Fighter Squadron (1992–present)
  - 202nd Tactical Fighter Squadron (1991–2000)
  - 203rd Tactical Fighter Squadron (1992–present)
  - 204th Tactical Fighter Squadron (1992–present)
  - 301st Tactical Fighter Squadron (1991–present)
  - 302nd Tactical Fighter Squadron (1992–present)
  - 303rd Tactical Fighter Squadron (1992–present)
  - 304th Tactical Fighter Squadron (1991–present)
  - 305th Tactical Fighter Squadron (1992–present)
  - 306th Tactical Fighter Squadron (1992–present)

== Accidents ==
- On 12 March 1991, aircraft 16-5654 was written off in an accident where it crashed into the sea during a return from a training flight.
- On 1 July 1991, aircraft 06-5653 crashed off the coast of Hokkaido, resulting in a single fatality.
- On 4 July 2000, two aircraft of the Blue Impulse display team (46-5727 and 46-5720) were both destroyed. Three crew were killed. Aerobatic training was halted until March 2001 as a consequence of the accident.
- On 29 January 2014, aircraft 46-5731 and 46-5745 of the Blue Impulse team collided in mid-air during a training flight near Matsushima. Both aircraft were able to safely return to base.
- On 14 May 2025, a Kawasaki T-4 trainer aircraft of the Japan Air Self-Defense Force crashed into a lake, leaving its two occupants missing.

== Specifications (T-4) ==
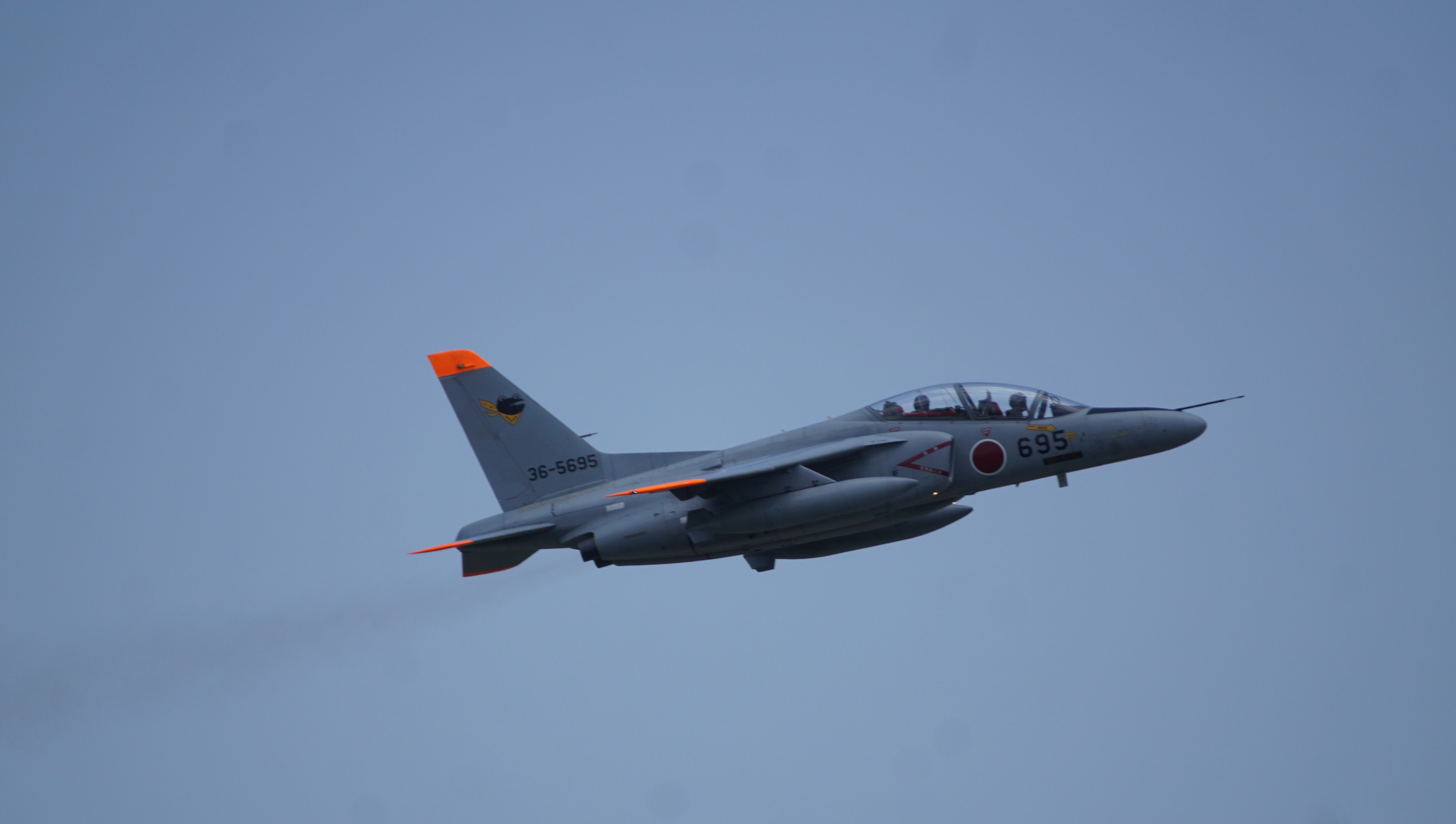
A T-4 of 301st Squadron at Hyakuri Air Base (2017)

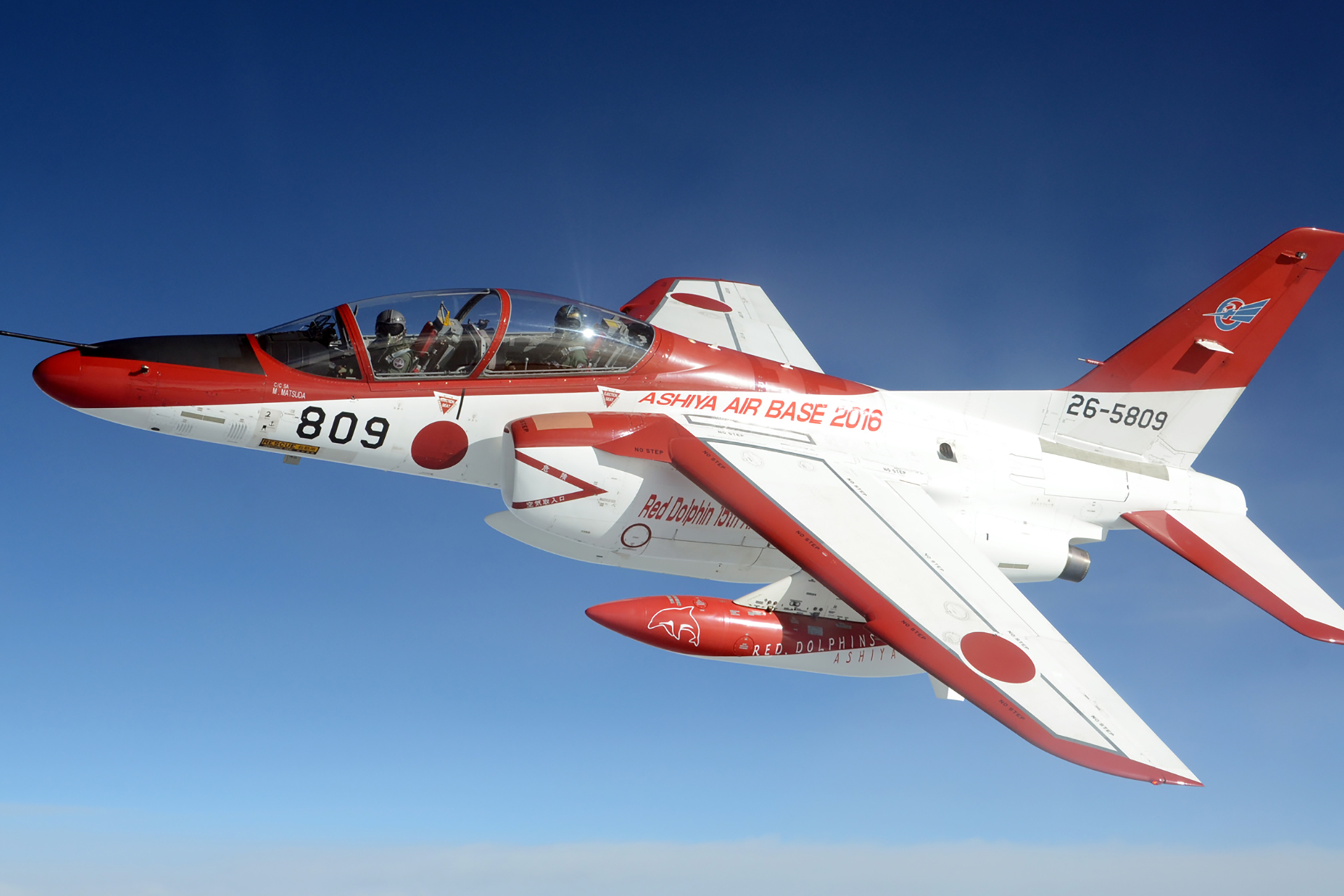
T-4 of the 13th Flight Training Wing at Ashiya Air Base circa 2016

Data from Jane's All the World's Aircraft 1988–89

General characteristics

- Crew: 2
- Length: 13.00 m (42 ft 8 in)
- Wingspan: 9.94 m (32 ft 7 in)
- Height: 4.60 m (15 ft 1 in)
- Wing area: 21.00 m^{2} (226.0 sq ft)
- Aspect ratio: 4.7:1
- Empty weight: 3,700 kg (8,157 lb)
- Max takeoff weight: 7,500 kg (16,535 lb)
- Fuel capacity: 2,241 L (493 imp gal; 592 US gal) internal fuel
- Powerplant: 2 × Ishikawajima-Harima F3-IHI-30 turbofans, 16.32 kN (3,670 lbf) thrust each

Performance

- Maximum speed: 1,038 km/h (645 mph, 560 kn) at sea level
- Stall speed: 167 km/h (104 mph, 90 kn)
- Range: 1,668 km (1,036 mi, 901 nmi) with two 450 L (99 imp gal; 120 US gal)
- Service ceiling: 15,240 m (50,000 ft)
- Rate of climb: 51 m/s (10,000 ft/min)

Armament

- Hardpoints: 5 (4 underwing and 1 under fuselage) for drop tanks, practice bombs and target towing equipment

== See also ==
Aircraft of comparable role, configuration, and era

- Aermacchi MB-339
- CASA C-101
- FMA IA-63 Pampa
- Hongdu JL-8
- Guizhou JL-9
- PZL I-22 Iryda

Related lists

- List of military aircraft of Japan
