= Red Knight (aerobatic team) =

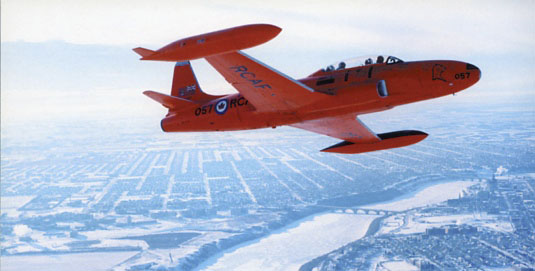
- The Red Knight flying over Saskatoon, Saskatchewan, November 1960
- Active: 1958–1969
- Country: Canada
- Branch: Royal Canadian Air Force, Canadian Forces
- Role: Aerobatic flight demonstration
- Size: One aircraft majority of the time
- Garrison/HQ: Trenton, Saskatoon, Portage la Prairie, Moose Jaw
- Colors: Red

Aircraft flown
- Trainer: Canadair CT-133 Silver Star, CT-114 Tutor

The Red Knight was a Canadian air force aerobatic display aircraft that operated from 1958 to 1969. The red-painted Silver Star performed loops, rolls, Cuban 8s, horizontal 360s, inverted flight, and high speed passes at airshows around North America, often appearing as an opening act for or in conjunction with the Golden Hawks display team and later the Golden Centennaires, Canada's contemporary aerobatic teams. The Silver Star was replaced by the Tutor in July 1968.

== History ==
During its service with the Royal Canadian Air Force (1958–1968) and the Canadian Forces (1968–1969), the Red Knight was flown by seventeen different pilots from four different bases. Beginning in 1961 a second Red Knight aircraft with alternate pilot entered service, and the aircraft sometimes performed together or separately in different locations. An accident involving two Red Knights occurred on August 21, 1963 at the Gimli Air Force Day airshow. When the aircraft were performing a Cuban 8, alternate pilot Flight Lieutenant Wayne MacLellan recognized that he was too low to the ground and aborted the manoeuvre. Lead pilot Flight Lieutenant J.W. "Bud" Morin failed to recognize this and was killed when his plane contacted the ground. An air force investigation allowed the team to continue, but forbade any further coordinated acts.

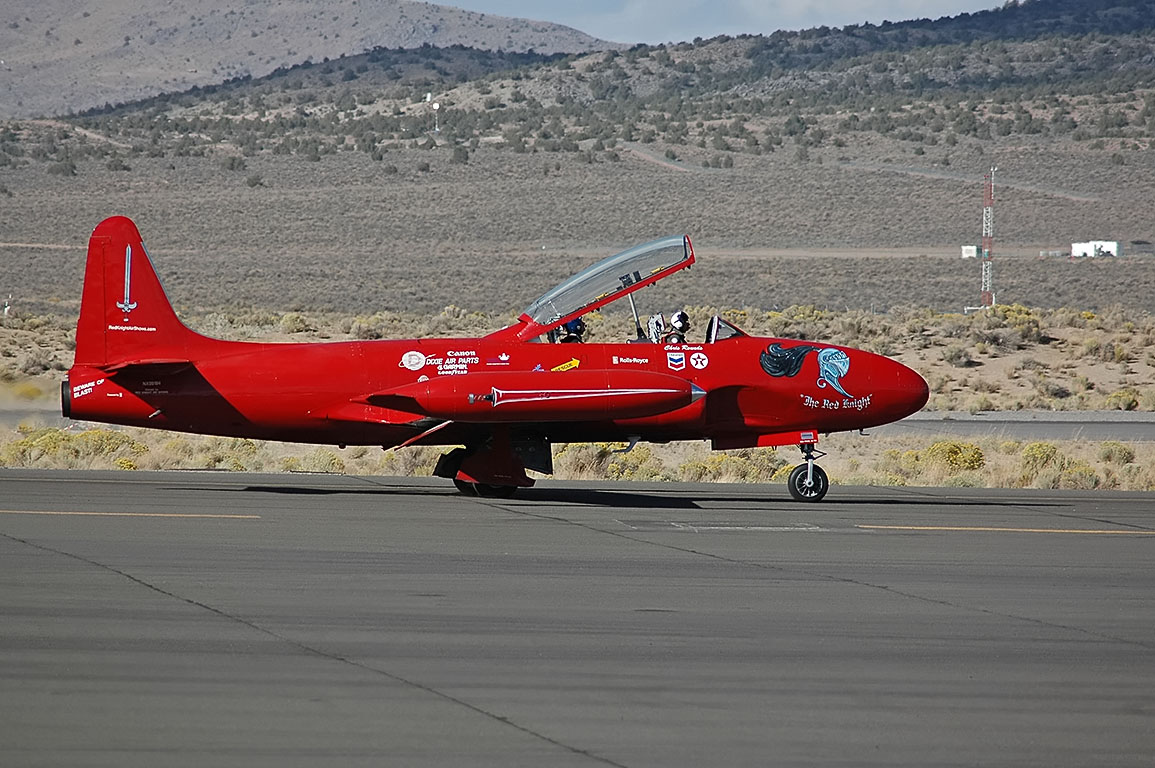
The "new" Red Knight in Reno, Nevada, 2004

The Red Knight had five trouble-free years of flying after Morin's accident, but that was cut short when pilot Capt. John Reid crashed during a photo shoot on May 22, 1968. After conducting a low-altitude loop, Reid could not pull the aircraft up fast enough and crashed into the ground. Though he was thrown clear of the wreckage, Reid died in hospital. This tragedy was closely followed by another. On July 13, 1969, Red Knight Capt. Bryan Alston was killed when his Tutor suffered a power failure and crashed during the forced landing. These two crashes in short succession led the air force to seriously reconsider the program. Ultimately, because of budget considerations and personnel cuts, the Red Knight program was canceled in 1969.

After its disappearance as a formal demonstration aircraft, the Red Knight was resurrected as a private show in the United States. Between 1990 and 1993, Rick Brickert flew a restored Lockheed T-33 in airshows around the United States and as the pace plane for the Reno Air Races. After Rick's death in 1993 when he crashed the Pond Racer experimental aircraft, the T-33 sat unused until acquired by Red Knight Air Shows, LLC in 2003. This company currently operates the T-33 and coordinates appearances at airshows around the continent.

The Jet Aircraft Museum in London, Ontario has restored a Silver Star to flying condition and the aircraft has been painted in the Red Knight paint scheme.
