= Boeing Skyfox =

Trainer aircraft in the US

Skyfox
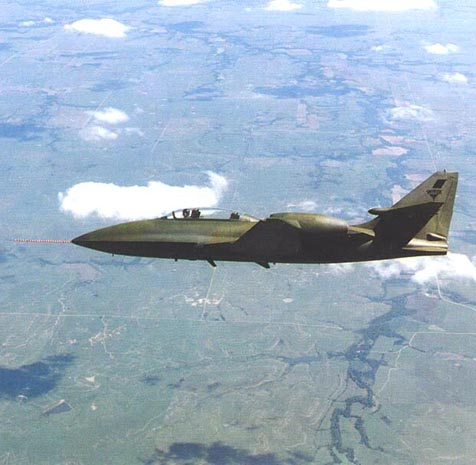
- Camouflaged Skyfox prototype in flight

General information
- Type: Jet trainer
- National origin: United States
- Manufacturer: Skyfox Corporation, later Boeing
- Number built: 1

History
- Manufactured: 1982
- First flight: 23 August 1983
- Retired: 1997
- Developed from: Lockheed T-33

The Boeing Skyfox is an American twin-engined jet trainer aircraft, a highly upgraded development of the Lockheed T-33. It was designed as a primary trainer to compete with and replace the Cessna T-37 Tweet. Besides its primary role as a trainer, the aircraft was envisioned to have other roles as well, including ground attack. The program was started by the Skyfox Corporation in 1983, and was acquired by Boeing in 1986.

The program included the replacement of the Allison J33-A-35 turbojet by two Garrett TFE731-3A turbofans. It also included an extensive redesign of the airframe. Only one prototype aircraft was built, and the program was later canceled due to lack of customers.

== Design and development ==
Over 6,500 Lockheed T-33 trainers were built, making it one of the most successful jet trainer programs in history. However, technology passed the "T-Bird" by, and by the 1980s, it was clear that the world's air forces needed a more modern training aircraft. The "Skyfox" was conceived and developed by Russell O'Quinn. The modification designs were led by T-33 designer Irvin Culver and a number of other former Lockheed employees formed Flight Concepts Incorporated in 1982, with the intent of modernizing the T-33 design. The company's name was later changed to Skyfox Corporation.

The highly modified and modernized aircraft was expected to cost about half of a new comparable trainer, such as the BAE Hawk and Dassault/Dornier Alpha Jet. With the design work done, Skyfox purchased 80 surplus T-33s.

The Skyfox was marketed either as a complete converted aircraft from Boeing, or as a conversion kit, with the customer providing the T-33 airframe. The conversion incorporated about 70% of the existing T-33 airframe, but replaced the existing internal single Allison J33 turbojet engine with two Garrett TFE731-3A turbofan engines mounted externally. Together, the two TFE731s weighed 17% less than the single original engine, while providing 60% more thrust on 45% less fuel.

The engine change provided a large internal volume for fuel storage, eliminating the need for the T-33's wingtip tanks, but tip mountings were retained to accommodate optional auxiliary fuel tanks if desired.

Other modifications included inboard wing leading-edge extensions, the replacement of the tip tanks with winglets, a new canopy with one-piece windshield, revised nose geometry to improve visibility from the cockpit and to fair into the T-33's lateral intakes, new tail surfaces with a mid-set tailplane (although the original wings were retained), and new avionics.

=== Conversion options ===
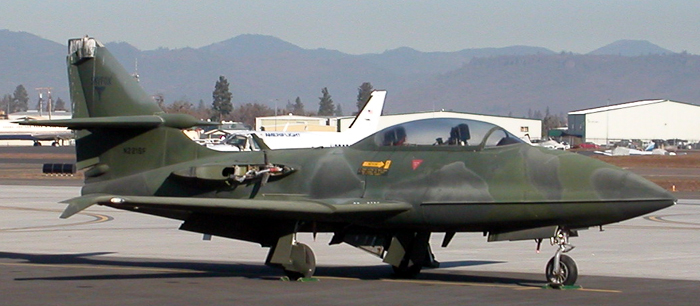
Skyfox prototype without engines

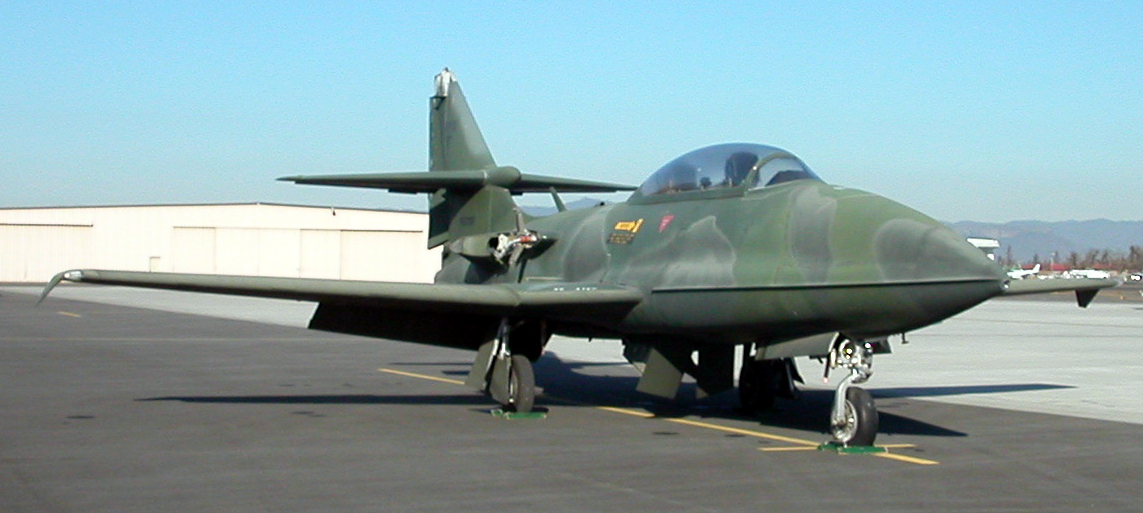
Skyfox prototype

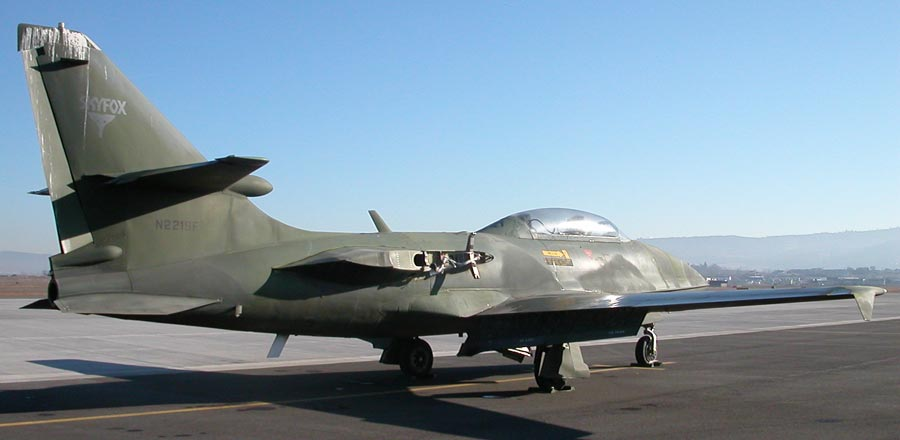
Skyfox prototype

The Skyfox was designed to be produced entirely from kits of components. The conversion involved the disassembly, the inspection, and the refurbishment of the T-33 airframe as necessary; the installation of the kits; and reassembly of the airframe in the Skyfox configuration.

There were two conversion options: to purchase a complete Skyfox from Boeing or to purchase a conversion kit from Boeing and perform the conversion in the country itself.

The standard conversion kit included:

- Two Garrett TFE731-3A turbofans, the nacelles, and the propulsion support system.
- Nose and tail assemblies.
- Single-point refuelling.
- Aerodynamic refinement kit.
- Structural refinement kit.
- Nose wheel steering.
- Anti-skid power brakes.
- Single-piece windshield.
- Hydraulic components kit.
- Generator control and distribution system.
- Throttle quadrants and control system.
- Fire extinguishing system.
- Control panels for the cockpit.

In addition to the standard conversion kit described above, Boeing also offered a number of options that could further improve the overall capability of the Skyfox:

- Avionics upgrade.
- Basic rewiring of the aircraft.
- Tactical, reconnaissance, and electronic warfare training mission packages.
- Zero-zero ejection seats.

=== Operation and support costs ===
The operating and support costs of the Skyfox were less than that of the T-33 and could compete with the costs of the Hawk and the Alpha Jet. Structural improvements, avionics upgrades, electrical rewiring, airframe and systems refurbishment, and powerplant modifications resulted in low cost, low maintenance hours, and low spare parts consumption.

The two TFE731-3A turbofans that powered the Skyfox together weighed 17 per cent less than the single J33-A-35 turbojet of the T-33, while producing 60 percent more thrust and consuming 45 percent less fuel. The TFE731-3A turbofan had a ten-fold increase in time between overhauls (TBO) compared with the J33-A-35 turbojet. The result was a greatly improved maneuverability, range, endurance, and payload, plus the added overwater and hostile terrain safety of the twin powerplant configuration.

=== Potential customers ===
==== Portugal ====
To replace the T-33A, Portugal signed a letter of intent with the Skyfox Corporation in the middle of the 1980s for 20 conversion kits. The Força Aérea Portuguesa (FAP) proposed that Oficinas Gerais de Material Aeronautico (OGMA) in Alverca would undertake the conversions, but insufficient orders were obtained from other nations to motivate Boeing to continue with the project.

==== United States ====
The USAF was interested in the Skyfox. It was originally planned to demonstrate the Skyfox at Farnborough International 1986, but the aircraft was tested at the time by the USAF. Eventually, the USAF did not purchase the Skyfox.

== Operational history ==
The first Skyfox converted was an ex-Canadian Forces Canadair CT-133 Silver Star (the Canadian license-built variant of the T-33) which was formerly a Silver Star 3AT (Armament Trainer). This particular aircraft, produced in 1958, had construction number T.33–160 and serial number RCAF 21160. It was struck off charge on 10 November 1970 and was sold through Crown Assets Disposal Corporation to Leroy Penhall/Fighter Imports in 1973. It was then sold to Murray McCormick Aerial Surveys in 1975. Its next owner was Consolidated Leasing in 1977.

The Skyfox was sold to the Skyfox Corporation, carrying the U.S. civilian registration number of N221SF, on 14 January 1983, and went to the Flight Test Research in August of that year. After conversion to the Skyfox configuration it flew its first flight as the Skyfox prototype on 23 August 1983, nearly 35.5 years after the first flight of the T-33. Race and test pilot Skip Holm performed the initial flight test at the Mojave Airport, California. The Skyfox prototype was white overall, with black cheat lines, and a very pale blue trim.

The Skyfox Corporation was not able to find any buyers for the aircraft, despite its price and capability. However, in 1986, Boeing Military Aircraft Company saw potential, and purchased the marketing and production rights. Even though Portugal signed a letter of intent for 20 conversion kits, no other nation signed on, and faced with a lack of customers, Boeing cancelled the project. The prototype aircraft remains the only Skyfox built.

For over two decades, the prototype was parked on the flightline at Rogue Valley International-Medford Airport in Medford, Oregon without engines or cowlings. In 2021, the aircraft was acquired and restored to static display condition, and as of 2024 is on display at the Palm Springs Air Museum in Palm Springs, California.

== Specifications ==
Data from Jane's All the World's Aircraft 1986–87

General characteristics

- Crew: 2
- Length: 46 ft 0 in (14.02 m)
- Wingspan: 38 ft 10 in (11.84 m)
- Height: 12 ft 4 in (3.76 m)
- Wing area: 239.2 sq ft (22.22 m^{2})
- Airfoil: 6.68:1
- Empty weight: 10,284 lb (4,665 kg)
- Gross weight: 16,235 lb (7,364 kg) (clean)
- Max takeoff weight: 20,000 lb (9,072 kg)
- Fuel capacity: 779 US gal (649 imp gal; 2,950 L) internal
- Powerplant: 2 × Garrett TFE731-3A turbofan, 3,700 lbf (16 kN) thrust each

Performance

- Maximum speed: 505 kn (581 mph, 935 km/h) at optimum altitude
- Range: 1,960 nmi (2,260 mi, 3,630 km) (internal fuel)
- Ferry range: 2,947 nmi (3,391 mi, 5,458 km)
- Service ceiling: 50,000 ft (15,000 m)
- g limits: +7.33, -3.5
- Rate of climb: 7,500 ft/min (38 m/s)

Armament

- 6,000 lb (2,700 kg) external stores

== See also ==
Related development

- Lockheed T-33 Shooting Star
- Canadair CT-133 Silver Star
- Lockheed F-94 Starfire
- Lockheed P-80 Shooting Star
- Lockheed T2V SeaStar

Aircraft of comparable role, configuration, and era

- Aero L-39 Albatros
- BAe Hawk
- Canadair CT-114 Tutor
- Cessna T-37 Tweet
- Fairchild T-46
