= Canadair CT-133 Silver Star =

Canadian military training aircraft

CT-133 Silver Star
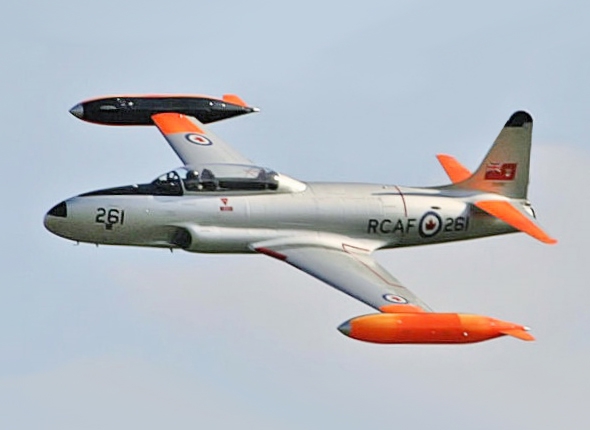
- CT-133 Silver Star

General information
- Type: Military trainer aircraft
- National origin: Canada
- Manufacturer: Canadair / Lockheed
- Primary users: Royal Canadian Air Force Canadian Forces
- Number built: 656

History
- First flight: December 1952
- Retired: 2005 (Canadian Forces)
- Developed from: Lockheed T-33

The Canadair CT-133 Silver Star (company model number CL-30) is the Canadian license-built version of the Lockheed T-33 jet trainer aircraft, in service from the 1950s to 2005. The Canadian version was powered by the Rolls-Royce Nene 10 turbojet, instead of the original Allison J33.

== Design and development ==
The Canadair CT-133 was the result of a 1951 contract to build T-33 Shooting Star trainers for the Royal Canadian Air Force (RCAF) with a Rolls-Royce Nene 10 turbojet. A project designation of CL-30 was given by Canadair and the name was changed to Silver Star. The CT-133's appearance is distinctive due to the large fuel tanks usually carried on the wingtips. Canadair built 656 CT-133 aircraft.

== Operational history ==
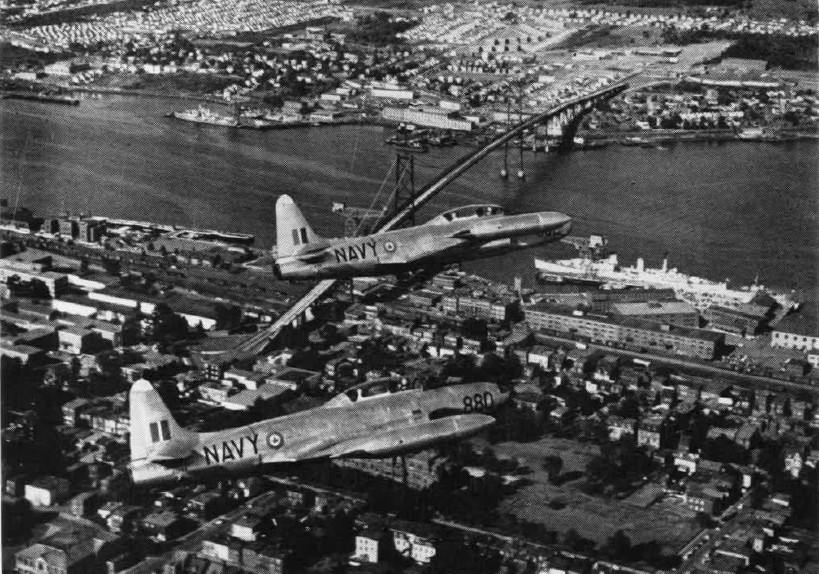
Two CT-133s of the Royal Canadian Navy over Halifax in 1957

The CT-133 entered service in the RCAF as its training aircraft for fighters. The designation of the Silver Star in the Canadian Forces was CT-133.

The CT-133's service career in the RCAF (and later the Canadian Forces) was extremely long. One of the more unusual roles it played was as an aerobatic demonstration aircraft, the RCAF's Red Knight. Although the aircraft stopped being used as a trainer in 1976, there were still over 50 aircraft in Canadian Forces inventory in 1995. The newest of these was then 37 years old and had exceeded its expected life by a factor of 2.5. During this period, the Canadair T-33 was employed in communication, target towing, and enemy simulation.

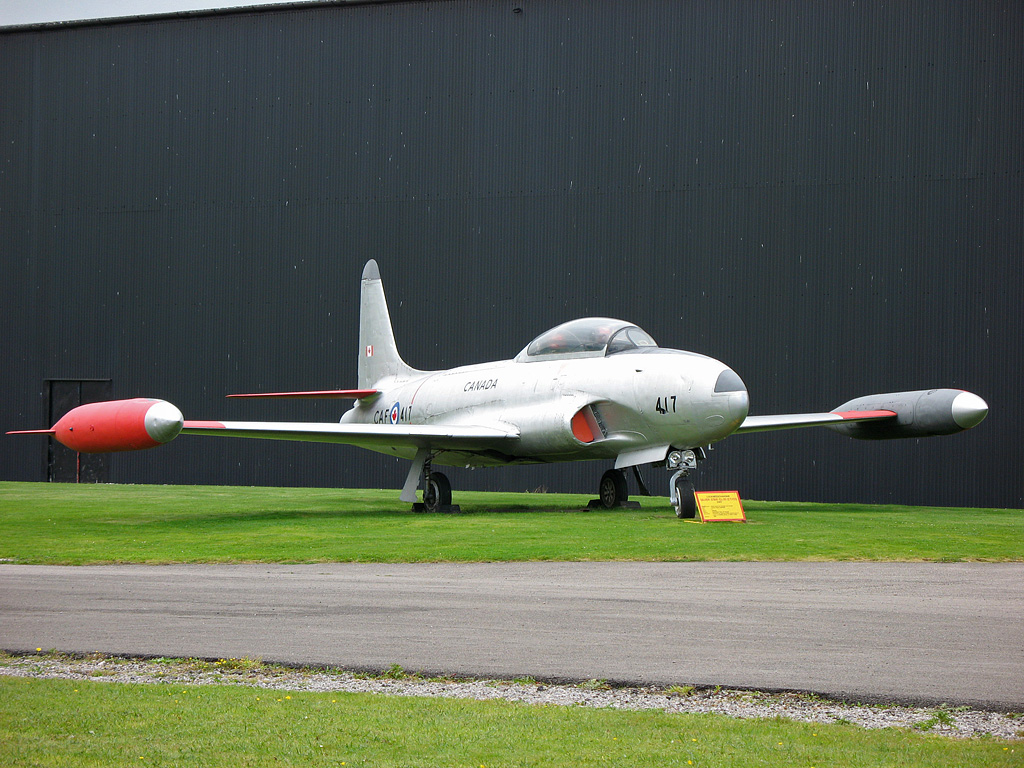
A Canadair CT-133 Silver Star at RAF Elvington

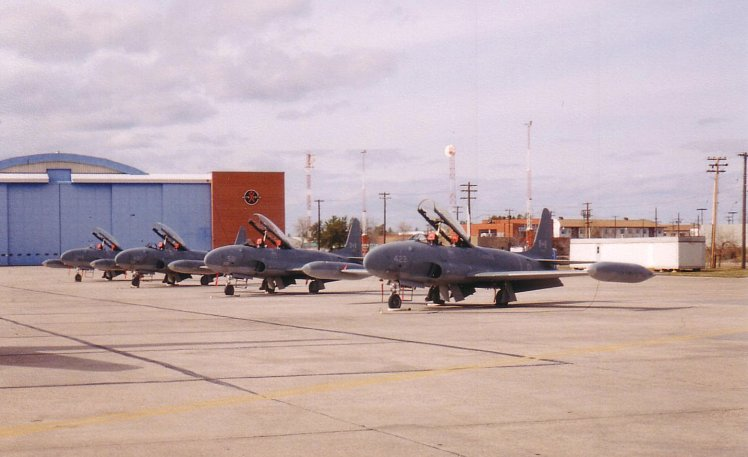
A line of Canadair CT-133 Silver Stars of 417 Combat Support Squadron at CFB Cold Lake

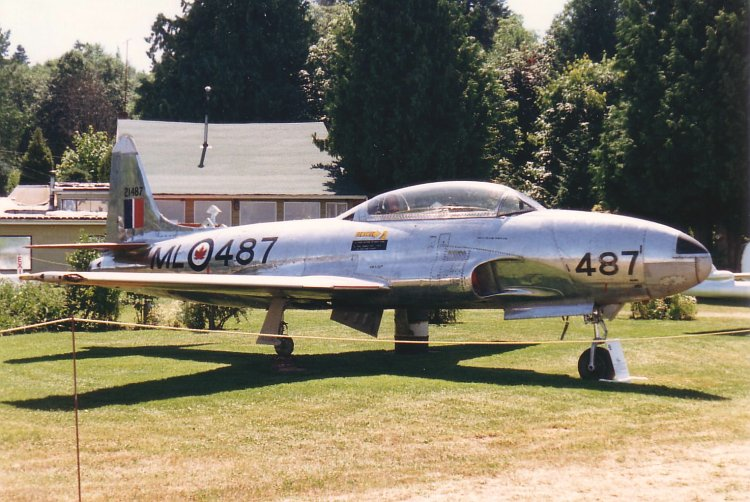
Canadair CT-133 Silver Star without wingtip tanks, in RCAF markings at the Canadian Museum of Flight, July 1988

The final Silver Star Mk. 3 was retired from the Aerospace Engineering Test Establishment at CFB Cold Lake, Alberta, where it was used as an ejection seat testbed for 46 years, when it was sold as surplus on the civil market, with fifteen other CT-133s to join fifty others on the US Civil Register.

== Variants ==
- T-33A Silver Star Mk 1: Two-seat jet trainer for the RCAF built by Lockheed in the United States, 30 loaned to the RCAF.
- CT-133ANX Silver Star Mk 2: The first Canadian prototype. One built.
- Silver Star Mk 3: Two-seat jet training aircraft for the RCAF.
  - Silver Star Mk 3PT: Unarmed version.
  - Silver Star Mk 3AT: Armed version, two Browning .50 in (13 mm) machine guns in nose and underwing pylons for 1,000 lb (450 kg) bombs and HVAR rockets.
  - Silver Star Mk 3PR: Photo-reconnaissance version.
- CE-133: Electronic warfare training aircraft.
- CX-133: Ejection seat testbed.
- ET-133: Aerial threat simulator aircraft.
- TE-133: Anti-ship threat simulator aircraft.

== Operators ==
Bolivia

- Bolivian Air Force operated 20 AT-33A-Ns (former Canadian Forces)

Canada

- Royal Canadian Air Force
  - Red Knight (aerobatic team)
- Royal Canadian Navy
- Canadian Forces
- National Research Council

France

- French Air Force delivered between 1959 and 1962

Greece

- Hellenic Air Force (former RCAF aircraft)

Portugal

- Portuguese Air Force

Turkey

- Turkish Air Force

== Aircraft on display ==
The following locations have CT-133 Silver Stars on display or in flyable condition:

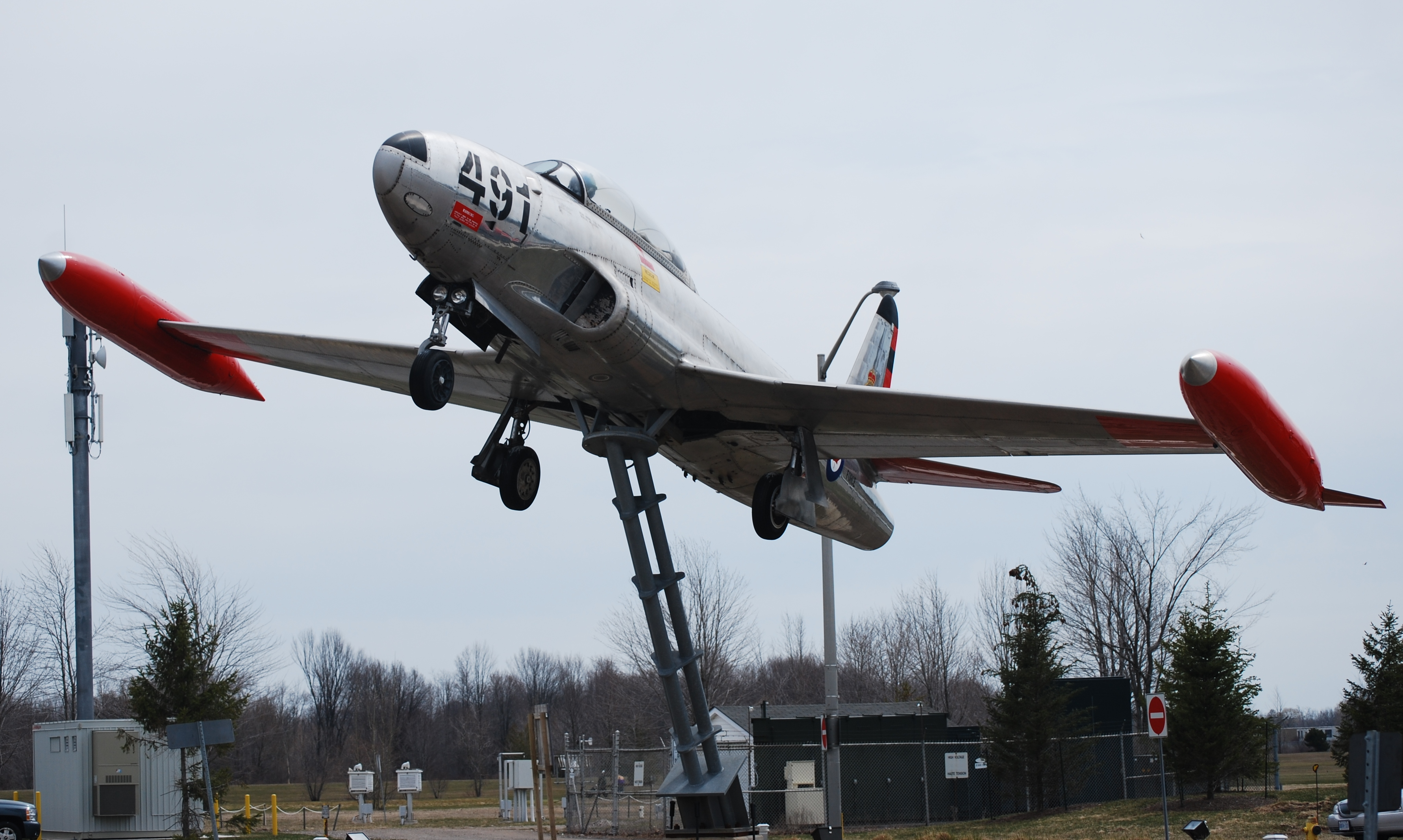
T-33 at London International Airport

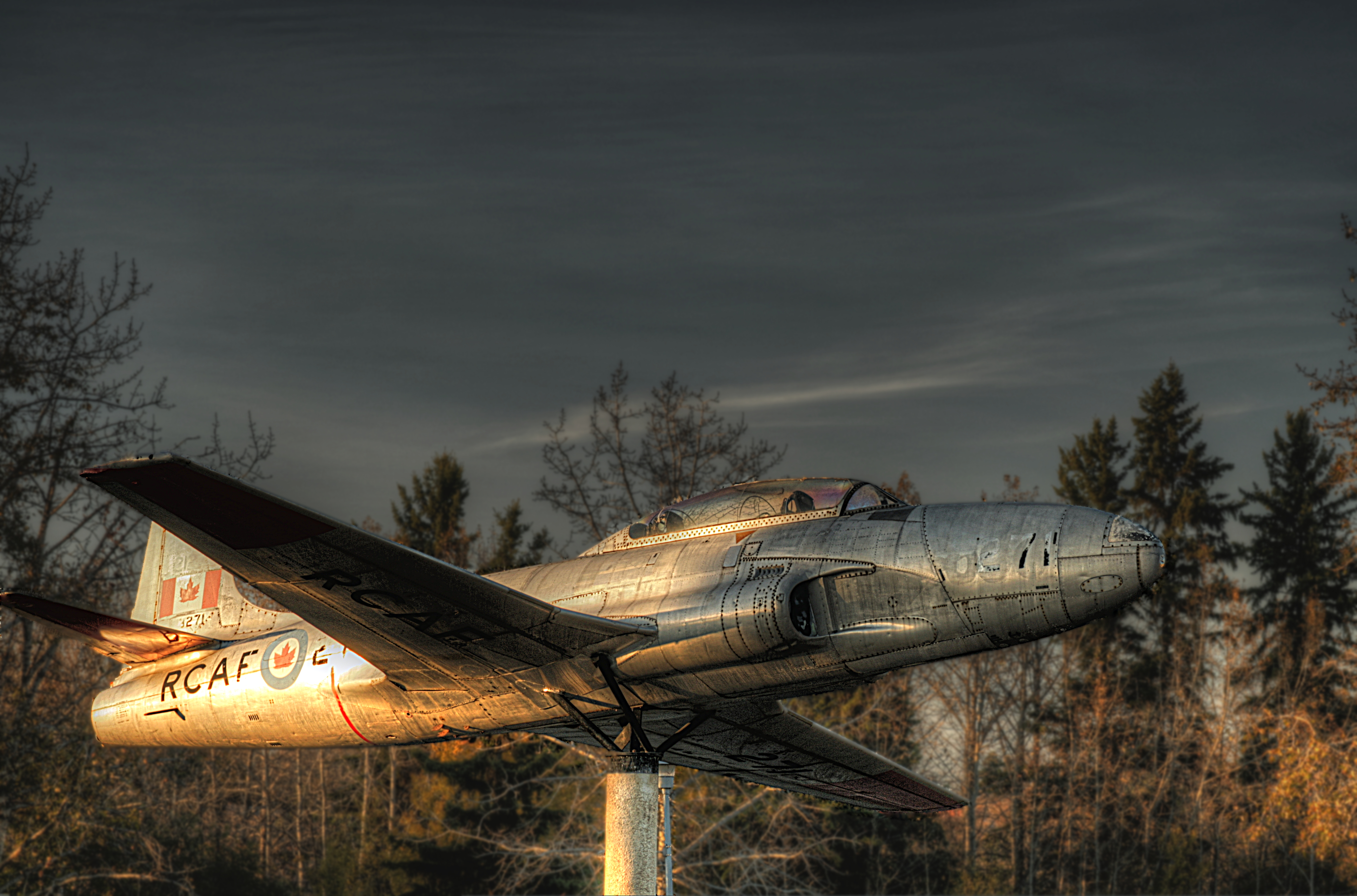
CT-133 Silver Star displayed in St. Albert, Alberta

Alberta

- 21081 near Airdrie, Alberta, in the yard of a private owner.
- Approximately 7 CT-133's are on display or in storage at CFB Cold Lake.
- 21072 is displayed at CFB Edmonton.
- 21506 and 21533 are in the Alberta Aviation Museum's collection in Edmonton, Alberta.
- 21097 is mounted on a pylon in Edson, Alberta.
- 21518 is on display in Leduc, Alberta.
- 21578 is outside the Royal Canadian Legion in Lethbridge, Alberta.
- 21272 is on a pylon outside the Bomber Command Museum of Canada in Nanton, Alberta.
- 21437 is on a pedestal at Rocky Mountain House, Alberta.
- 21271 is outside the Royal Canadian Legion in St. Albert, Alberta.
- CT-133 given serial number 133419 is located in Warner, Alberta.
- 21089 and 21351 are at the Reynolds-Alberta Museum in Wetaskiwin, Alberta.
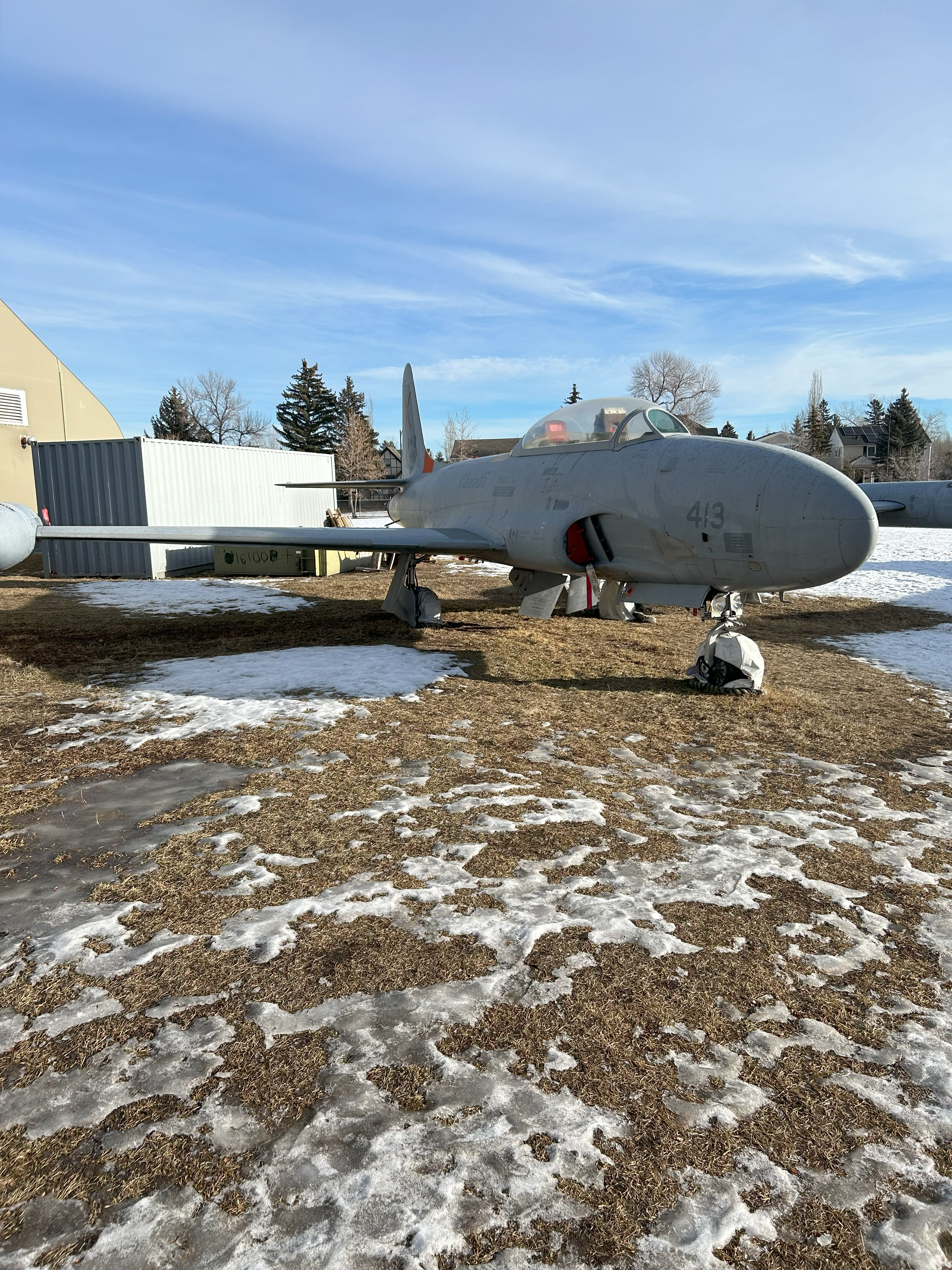
- CX-133 133413 restored to CT-133 Mk 3 standard displayed at The Military Museums, Calgary, Alberta.
  CX-133 133413 is on display at The Military Museums, in Calgary, Alberta, restored as a CT-133 Mk 3.

British Columbia

- Canadian Museum of Flight
- Comox Air Force Museum
- Princeton Airport

Manitoba

- Gimli
- Winnipeg Air Force Heritage Museum and Park

Nova Scotia

- Atlantic Canada Aviation Museum
- Greenwood Military Aviation Museum Greenwood, Nova Scotia
- Shearwater Aviation Museum

Ontario

- Canadian Air and Space Museum
- Canada Aviation Museum
- Canadian Historical Aircraft Association
- Canadian Warplane Heritage Museum
- Canadian Forces School of Aerospace Control Operations
- Fort Erie - Sugarbowl Park
- Jet Aircraft Museum – two operational, two static examples
- London International Airport
- National Air Force Museum of Canada
- 133540 as static gate guard of Blackdown Cadet Training Centre in CFB Borden

Quebec

- s/n 133333, Canadian Forces Base Bagotville
- s/n 133267, Val-d'Or

Saskatchewan

- 21630 is located near Saskatoon John G. Diefenbaker International Airport in Saskatoon, Saskatchewan

United Kingdom

- RAF Manston History Museum, at RAF Manston, Kent, England
- Yorkshire Air Museum, at RAF Elvington, England

== Surviving aircraft ==
=== Canada ===
- Jet Aircraft Museum – two operational examples
- Waterloo Warbirds - one operational example

=== United States ===
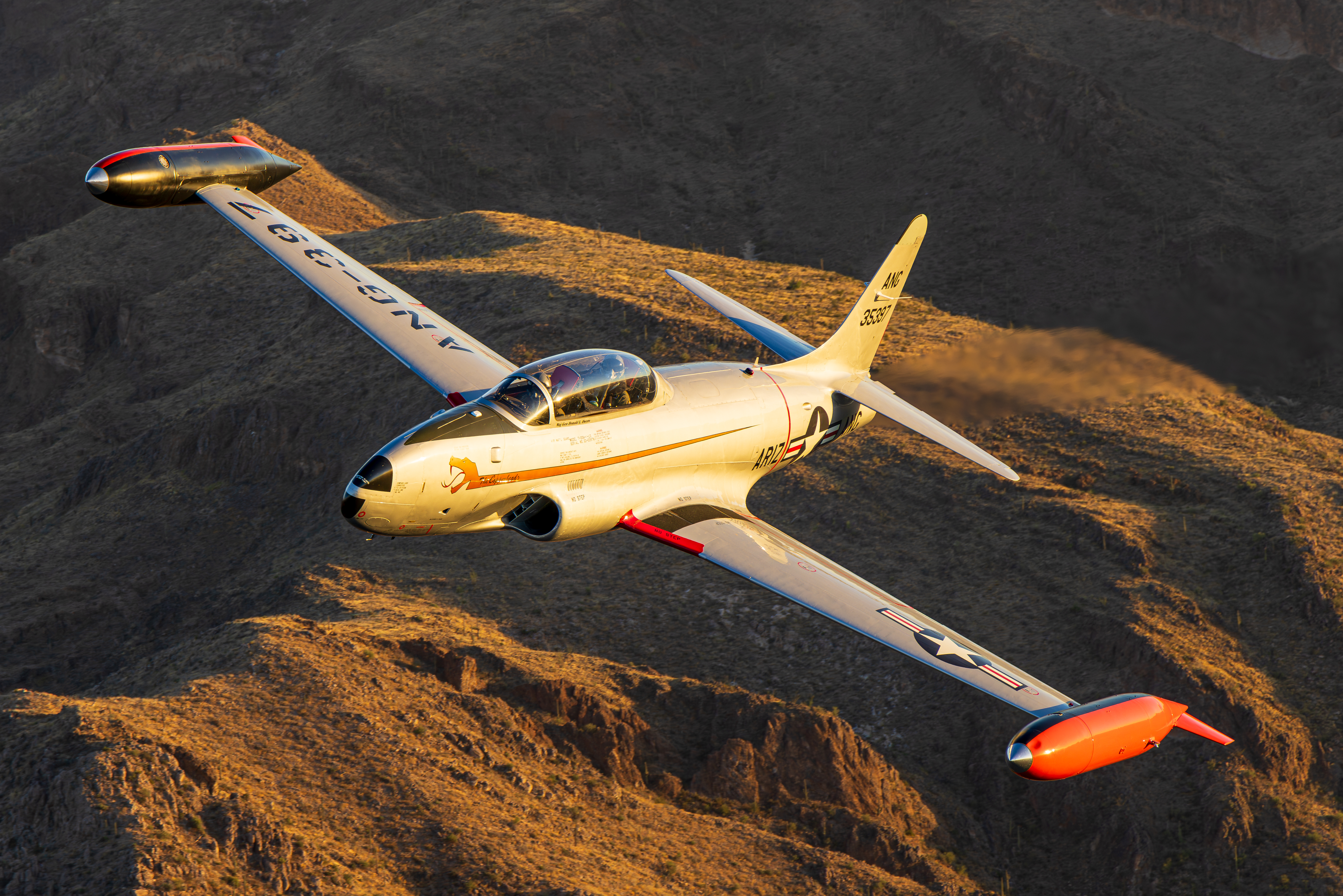
A privately owned airworthy CT-133, civil registration N161AZ, wearing Arizona Air National Guard markings, over Arizona in 2023

Airworthy

CT-133

- RCAF s/n 21024 - privately owned in Scottsdale, Arizona.
- RCAF s/n 21052 (CF s/n 133052) - privately owned in Mobile, Alabama.
- RCAF s/n 21098 - privately owned in Waller, Texas.
- RCAF s/n 21129 - privately owned in Salt Lake City, Utah.
- RCAF s/n 21157 - privately owned in Houston, Texas.
- RCAF s/n 21159 - privately owned in Belgrade, Montana.
- RCAF s/n 21165 (CF s/n 133165) - Vintage Flying Museum in Fort Worth, Texas.
- RCAF s/n 21192 - privately owned in Guthrie, Oklahoma.
- RCAF s/n 21298 - operated by Boeing Aircraft in Seattle, Washington.
- RCAF s/n 21306 - privately owned in San Rafael, California.
- RCAF s/n 21369 - operated by Boeing Aircraft in Seattle, Washington.
- RCAF s/n 21375 - privately owned in Santa Fe, New Mexico.
- RCAF s/n 21377 (CF s/n 133377) - Planes of Fame in Chino, California.
- RCAF s/n 21440 - privately owned in Delanson, New York.
- RCAF s/n 21456 - privately owned in Brigham City, Utah.
- RCAF s/n 21467 (CF s/n 133467) - privately owned in Litchfield Park, Arizona.
- RCAF s/n 21479 (CF s/n 133479) - privately owned in Bulverde, Texas.
- RCAF s/n 21504 (CF s/n 133504) - privately owned in Scottsdale, Arizona.
- RCAF s/n 21556 - privately owned in Chicago, Illinois.
- RCAF s/n 21557 (CF s/n 133557) - privately owned in Mesa, Arizona.
- RCAF s/n 21559 - privately owned in Parowan, Utah.
- RCAF s/n 21566 - Tennessee Museum of Aviation in Sevierville, Tennessee.
- RCAF s/n 21579 (CF s/n 133579) - privately owned in Oconomowoc, Wisconsin.
- RCAF s/n 21582 - War Eagles Air Museum in Santa Teresa, New Mexico.
- RCAF s/n 21590 (CF s/n 133590) - privately owned in Carson City, Nevada.
- RCAF s/n 21604 (CF s/n 133604) - privately owned in Jurupa Valley, California.
- CF s/n 133452 - privately owned in San Rafael, California.
- CF s/n 133610 - privately owned in San Rafael, California.
- CF s/n 133564 - privately owned in San Antonio, Texas.

Under restoration

CT-133

- RCAF s/n 21483 (CF s/n 133483) - to airworthiness by private owner in Houston, Texas.
- RCAF s/n 21560 (CF s/n 133560) - to airworthiness by private owner in Houston, Texas.
- RCAF s/n 21571 (CF s/n 133571) - to airworthiness by private owner in Houston, Texas.
- RCAF s/n 21613 (CF s/n 133613) - to airworthiness by private owner in Ione, California.
- RCAF s/n 21615 (CF s/n 133615) - to airworthiness by private owner in Jordan Valley, Oregon.
- CF s/n 133083 - to airworthiness the Military Aircraft Restoration Corporation in Anaheim, California.

== Specifications (CT-133) ==
Data from

General characteristics

- Crew: one–two
- Length: 11.48 m (37 ft 8 in)
- Wingspan: 12.93 m (42 ft 5 in)
- Height: 3.55 m (11 ft 8 in)
- Empty weight: 3,830 kg (8,444 lb)
- Max takeoff weight: 7,630 kg (16,800 lb)
- Powerplant: 1 × Rolls-Royce Nene 10 turbojet, 22 kN (5,000 lbf) thrust

Performance

- Maximum speed: 920 km/h (570 mph, 500 kn)
- Service ceiling: 14,000 m (46,000 ft)

== See also ==
Related development

- Lockheed P-80 Shooting Star
- Lockheed T-33 Shooting Star
- Lockheed T2V SeaStar
- Boeing Skyfox

Related lists

- List of military aircraft of Canada
