= Jet Aircraft Museum =

- Established: 12 September 2009
- Location: London International Airport, Ontario, Canada
- Coordinates: 43.03099°N 81.15552°W
- Type: Aviation museum
- President: Scott Ellinor
- Website: www.jetaircraftmuseum.ca/

The Jet Aircraft Museum is a charitable foundation aviation museum specializing in Canadian Forces jet aircraft. The museum is located at the London International Airport, the museum also does not receive any funding from the government, and strictly relies on donations and some private grants.

The museum officially opened on 12 September 2009.

== Mission ==
The museum states its mission as:

The Jet Aircraft Museum (JAM) will acquire, preserve, maintain, display and fly jet aircraft of the Canadian Forces from the DeHavilland Vampire to present day and future aircraft.

The museum has indicated its intention "JAM will strive to maintain four or more of each type as flying aircraft with a flight of four reflecting authentic Canadian Forces paint schemes." The museum has listed the CF-100 Canuck, Canadair Sabre, F2H-3 Banshee, CF-101 Voodoo, CF-104 Starfighter, CF-5 Freedom Fighter and CT-114 Tutor as being targets for intended acquisition.

== Aircraft ==
The aircraft owned by the museum are:

- Canadair CT-133 Silver Star - 4 ex-Canadian Forces aircraft, one converted to a "photo-ship"
- McDonnell CF-101 Voodoo - 1
- Hawker Hunter - 1
- CT-114 Tutor - 1
- De Havilland Vampire - 1
- Yokosuka MXY-7 Ohka - 1 replica (mix of original parts and reproductions)
- Mikoyan MiG 29UB (Product 9.13) Fulcrum-B - 1 (ex-Malaysian Air Force aircraft however colored in Ukrainian Falcons livery)

The museum is working towards repatriating a pair of CF104/F104 Starfighters from Greece

== See also ==
- List of aerospace museums
