= 3rd Tactical Fighter Squadron (JASDF) =

- 第3飛行隊
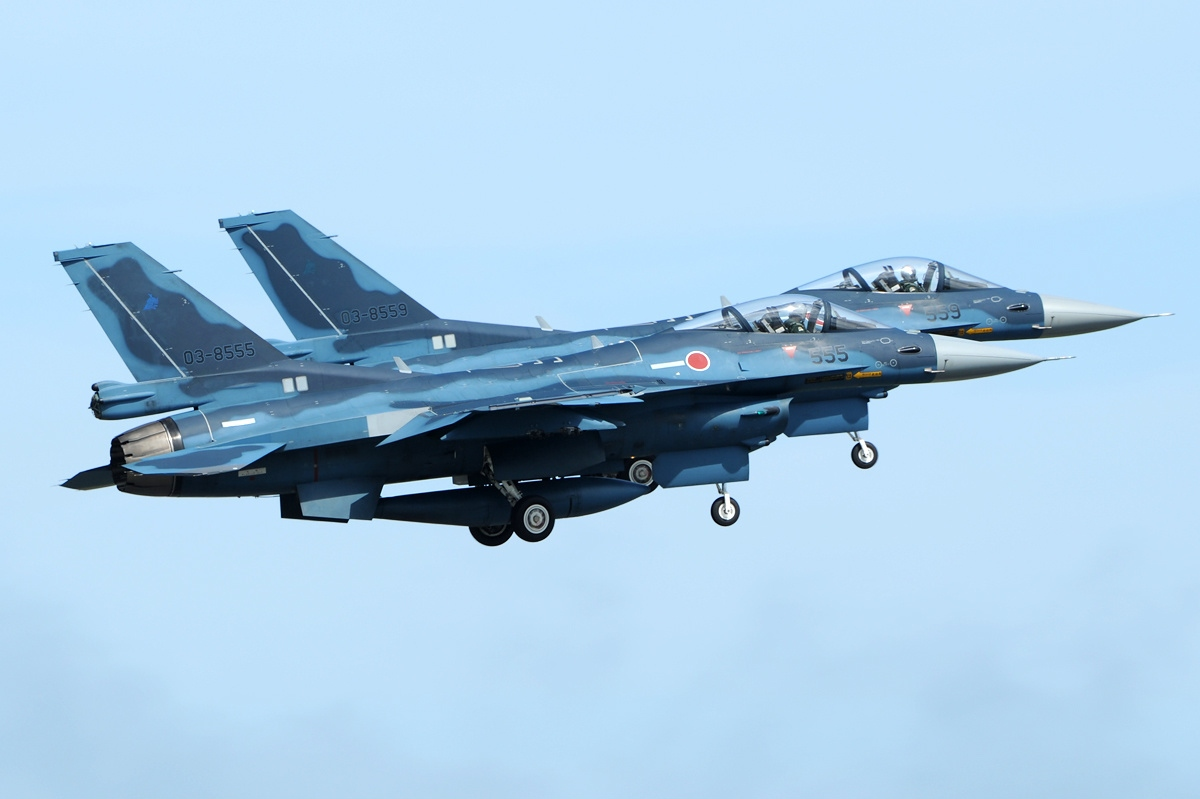
- 3 Squadron Mitsubishi F-2As (2011)
- Active: October 1, 1956 – present
- Country: Japan
- Branch: Japan Air Self-Defense Force
- Part of: Central Air Defense Force, 7th Air Wing
- Garrison/HQ: Hyakuri Air Base

Aircraft flown
- Fighter: Mitsubishi F-2
- Trainer: Kawasaki T-4

The 3rd Tactical Fighter Squadron (第3飛行隊 (dai-sann-hikoutai)) is a squadron of the 7th Air Wing of the Japan Air Self-Defense Force (JASDF) based at Hyakuri Air Base, in Ibaraki Prefecture, Japan. It is equipped with Mitsubishi F-2 and Kawasaki T-4 aircraft.

It is currently the longest-serving JASDF squadron, as the 1st and 2nd Squadrons have been disbanded.

== History ==
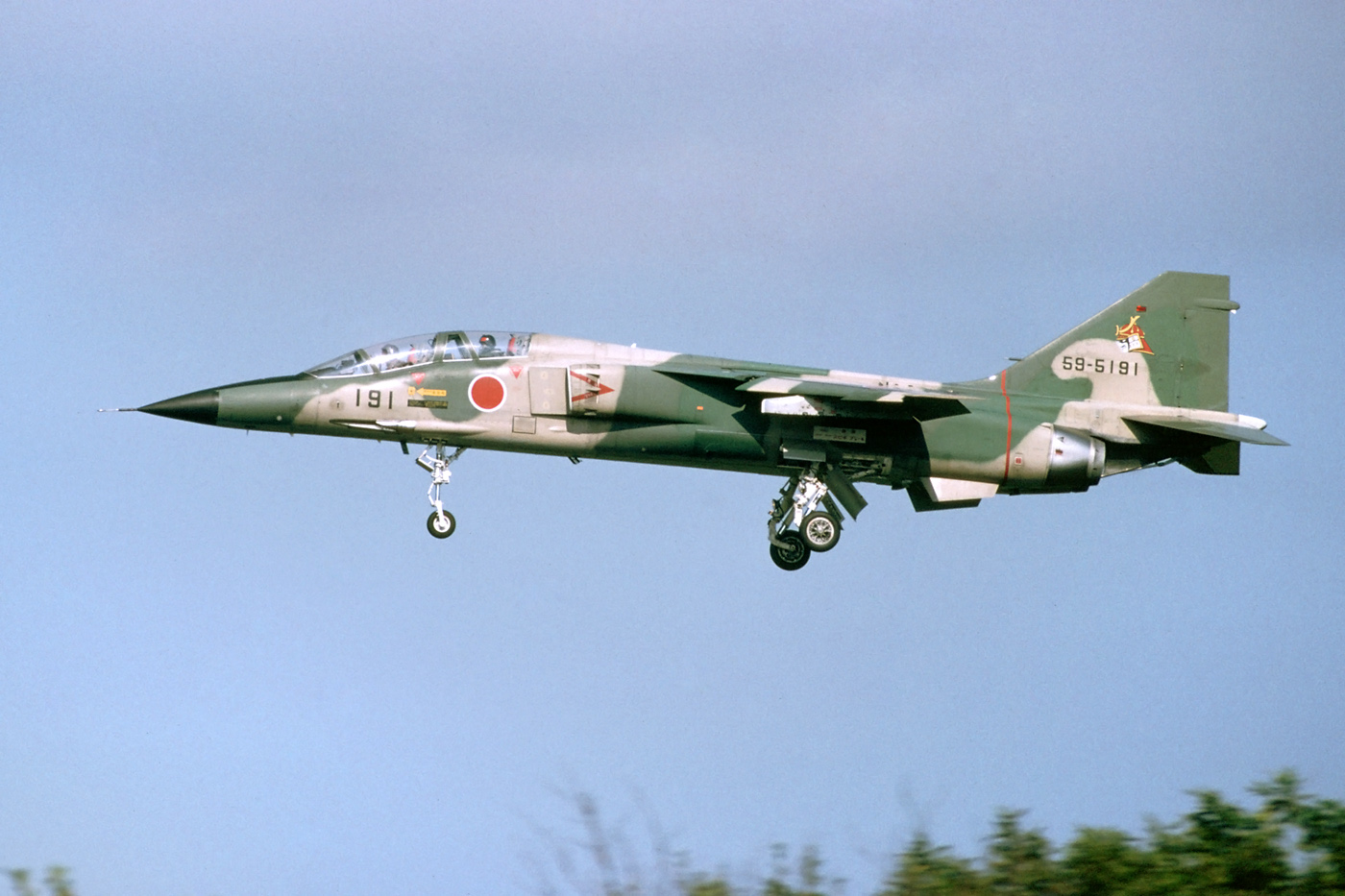
Mitsubishi T-2 (1994)

On October 1, 1956 the squadron was formed at Hamamatsu Air Base in Shizuoka Prefecture as part of the 2nd Air Wing, equipped with the F-86F Sabre. On September 2, 1957 it relocated to Chitose Air Base in Hokkaido Prefecture. On March 5, 1963 it moved to Matsushima Air Base in Miyagi Prefecture and was transferred to the 4th Air Wing. On February 1, 1964, as part of the 81st Air Group, the squadron moved again to Hachinohe Air Base in Aomori Prefecture. On December 12, 1971 it relocated to Misawa Air Base, also in Aomori Prefecture.

On March 31, 1978 it updated from the F-86F to the Mitsubishi F-1 and was transferred to the 3rd Air Wing. From late March 2001 the squadron started replacing its F-1 aircraft with Mitsubishi F-2s. It was the first operational F-2 squadron. On March 19, 2004 it started flying the F-2.

In October 2016 the squadron conducted Exercise "Guardian North 2016" at Misawa. This was a joint exercise with four Eurofighter Typhoon FGR4 aircraft of 2 Squadron of the Royal Air Force. It was the first time British and Japanese fighter aircraft had trained together, the first time fighters from the two countries had met since World War II, and the first time the JASDF had trained in Japan with non-US military forces.

On March 26, 2020 unit officially transitioned from Misawa Air Base to Hyakuri Air Base.

== Tail marking ==
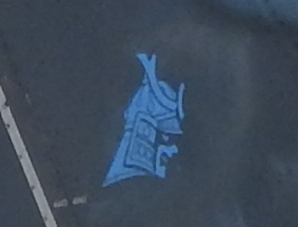
Tail marking (2016)

The squadron's current tail marking is a samurai's helmeted head in profile. A colorful design was adopted in 1983 when the squadron still operated F-1 aircraft. Since the squadron began operating the F-2s in maritime camouflage the tail marking design has been made smaller and less colorful.

== Aircraft operated ==
=== Fighter aircraft ===
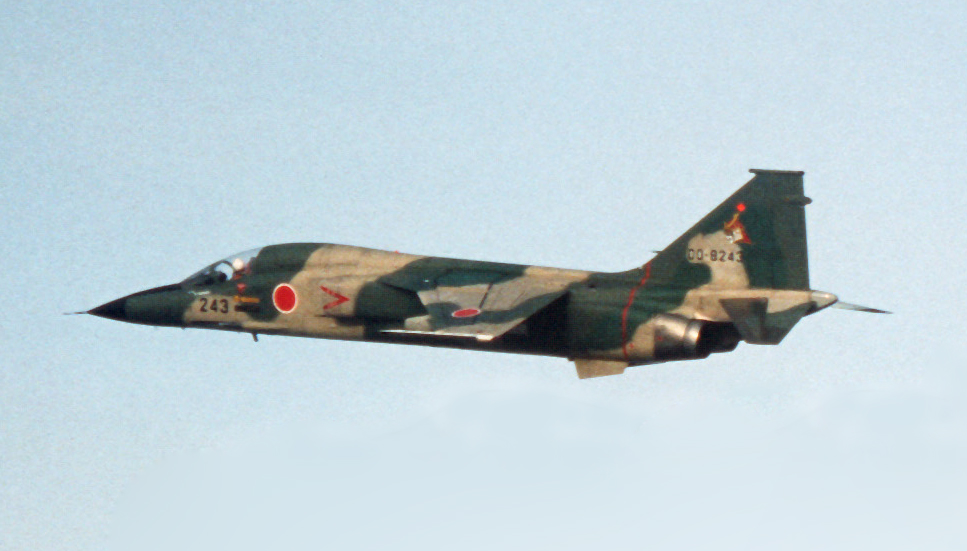
Mitsubishi F-1 (1984)

- North American F-86F Sabre（1956–1978）
- Mitsubishi F-1 (1978–2002）
- Mitsubishi F-2 (2001–present)

=== Liaison aircraft ===
- Lockheed T-33A (1956–1992)
- Mitsubishi T-2 (1978–2002)
- Kawasaki T-4 (1990–present)

== See also ==
- Fighter units of the Japan Air Self-Defense Force
