= 305th Tactical Fighter Squadron (JASDF) =

- 第305飛行隊
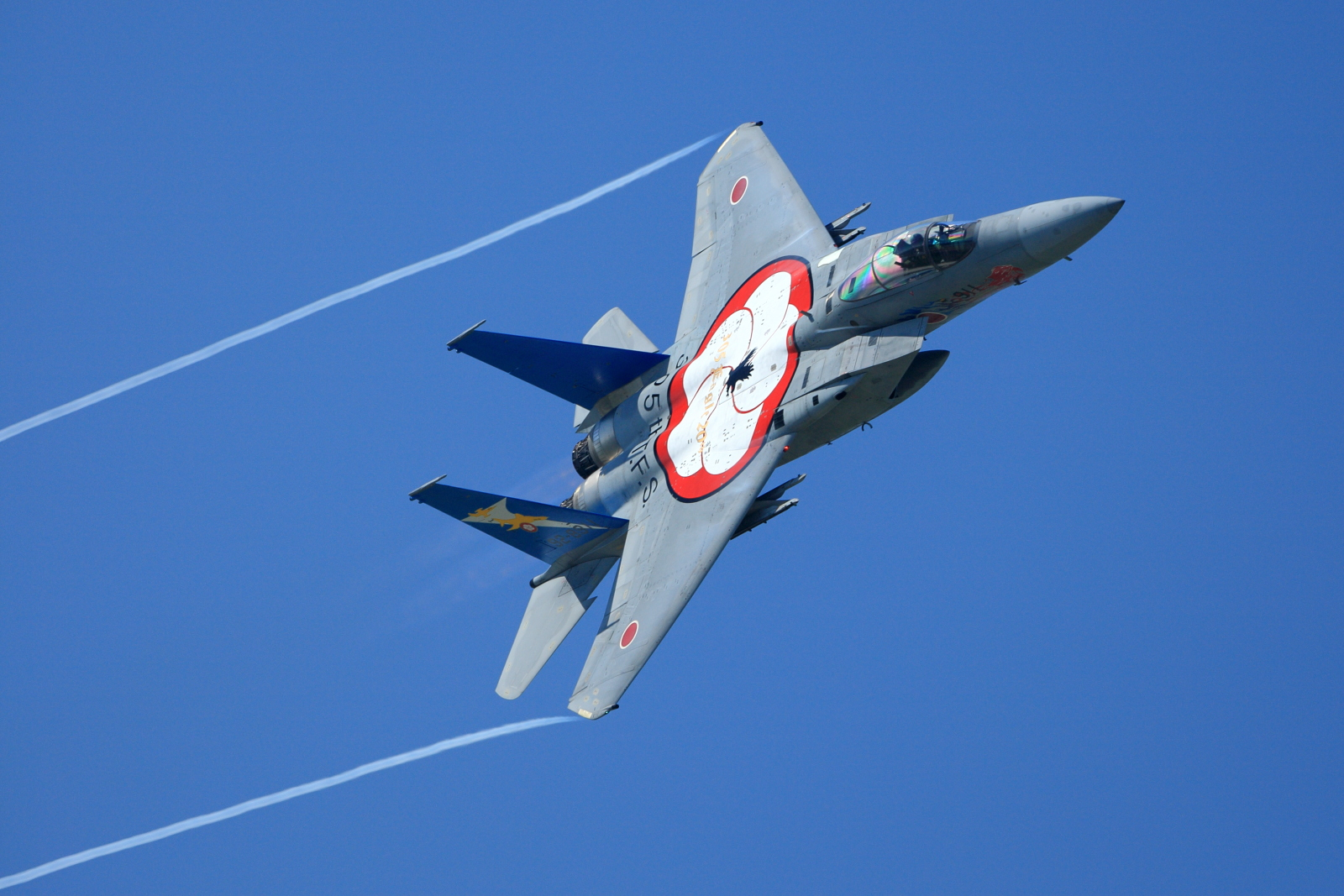
- 305 Squadron Mitsubishi F-15J (2012)
- Active: 1 December 1978 – present
- Country: Japan
- Branch: Japan Air Self-Defense Force
- Part of: Western Air Defense Force, 5th Air Wing
- Garrison/HQ: Nyutabaru Air Base

Commanders
- Current commander: Lt. Col. Kobayashi Yoshiyuki

Aircraft flown
- Fighter: Mitsubishi F-15J
- Trainer: Kawasaki T-4

The 305th Tactical Fighter Squadron (第305飛行隊 (dai-sann-byaku-go-hikoutai)) is a squadron of the 5th Air Wing of the Japan Air Self-Defense Force based at Nyutabaru Air Base, in Miyazaki Prefecture, Japan. It is equipped with Mitsubishi F-15J and Kawasaki T-4 aircraft.

== History ==
The squadron was founded on at Hyakuri Air Base in Ibaraki Prefecture on December 1, 1978 with McDonnell Douglas F-4EJ aircraft at part of the 7th Air Wing. It replaced the 206th Tactical Fighter Squadron, which was disbanded. During this period the JASDF followed a system in which the numbering of a squadron was dependent on the type of aircraft it operated. Single digit squadrons operated the F-86F, 100-numbered squadrons operated the F-86D, 200-numbered squadrons operated the F-104J and the new squadrons operating the F-4 were numbered in the 300s.

The squadron operated the F-4EJ for 15 years. On August 2, 1993 it upgraded to F-15J aircraft. On August 31 2016 it moved from Hyakuri Air Base to Nyutabaru Air Base, swapping with the F-4EJ Kai equipped 301st Tactical Fighter Squadron, which moved to Hyakuri.

In August 2018 Misa Matsushima, the first female fighter pilot in the JASDF, was assigned to the squadron.

== Tail marking ==
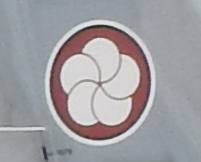
Tail marking (2016)

The squadron's current tail marking is of a plum blossom over a Hinomaru. Kairaku-en park located in Mito near Hyakuri Air Base in Ibaraki Prefecture is famous for its hundreds of plum blossom trees. The squadron using a plum blossom as its tail marking also continues the tradition of its predecessor the 206th TFS. That squadron used a different plum blossom design on the tails of its aircraft.

== Aircraft operated ==
=== Fighter aircraft ===
- McDonnell Douglas F-4EJ (1978–1993)
- Mitsubishi F-15J (1993–present)

=== Liaison aircraft ===
- Lockheed T-33A (1978–1993)
- Kawasaki T-4 (1992–present)

== See also ==
- Fighter units of the Japan Air Self-Defense Force
