= 302nd Fighter Squadron =

302nd Fighter Squadron may refer to:

- 302nd Tactical Fighter Squadron (Japan), an active unit of the Japan Air Self-Defense Force
- 302nd Fighter Squadron (United States), an active unit of the United States Air Force
