= 9th Squadron (JASDF) =

- 第9飛行隊
- Active: February 1, 1961
- Disbanded: December 20, 1965
- Country: Japan
- Branch: Japan Air Self-Defense Force
- Part of: Central Air Defense Force, 7th Air Wing
- Garrison/HQ: Iruma Air Base

Aircraft flown
- Fighter: North American F-86F Sabre

The 9th Squadron (第9飛行隊 (dai-kyuu-hikoutai)) was a squadron of the 7th Air Wing of the Japan Air Self-Defense Force based at Iruma Air Base, in Saitama Prefecture, Japan. It was equipped with North American F-86F Sabre aircraft.

== History ==
On February 1, 1961, the squadron was formed at Matsushima Air Base in Iwate Prefecture as part of the 4th Air Wing. After five months it transferred to the 7th Air Wing. On May 15, 1962, it moved to Iruma Air Base in Saitama Prefecture. The last of the American forces at Iruma (known as "Johnson Air Base" when under American control) departed the following month.

It was disbanded on December 20, 1965. On the same date the 7th Air Wing was relocated to Hyakuri Air Base in Ibaraki Prefecture to operate Lockheed F-104 Starfighters. Squadrons 1-11 were F-86F squadrons.

== Aircraft operated ==
=== Fighter aircraft ===
- North American F-86F Sabre（1961-1965）

== See also ==
- Fighter units of the Japan Air Self-Defense Force
