= 105th Squadron (JASDF) =

102nd Squadron
- 第102飛行隊
- Active: March 15, 1962
- Disbanded: December 1, 1967
- Country: Japan
- Branch: Japan Air Self-Defense Force
- Part of: Central Air Defense Force, 3rd Air Wing
- Garrison/HQ: Komaki Air Base

Aircraft flown
- Fighter: North American F-86D Sabre

The 105th Squadron (第105飛行隊 (dai-ichi-zero-go-hikoutai)) was a squadron of the 3rd Air Wing of the Japan Air Self-Defense Force (JASDF) based at Komaki Air Base in Aichi Prefecture, Japan. It was equipped with North American F-86D Sabre aircraft.

== History ==
On March 15, 1962 the squadron was formed at Komaki Air Base. It followed the 103rd Squadron. There was no 104th squadron formed because the JASDF had already decided to introduce the Lockheed F-104 Starfighter as the next interceptor.

It was disbanded on December 1, 1967, on the same day as fellow Komaki unit 102nd Squadron.

== Aircraft operated ==
=== Fighter aircraft ===
- North American F-86D Sabre（1962-1967）

== See also ==
- Fighter units of the Japan Air Self-Defense Force
