= 207th Tactical Fighter Squadron (JASDF) =

- 第207飛行隊
- Active: March 1, 1966-March 19, 1986
- Country: Japan
- Branch: Japan Air Self-Defense Force
- Part of: Southeastern Air Defense Force, 83rd Air Wing
- Garrison/HQ: Hyakuri Air Base

Aircraft flown
- Fighter: Lockheed F-104J/DJ

The 207th Tactical Fighter Squadron (第207飛行隊 (dai-ni-hyaku-shichi-hikoutai)) was a squadron of the 7th Air Wing of the Japan Air Self-Defense Force. It was based at Naha Air Base, in Okinawa Prefecture, Japan. It was equipped with Lockheed F-104J/DJ aircraft.

== History ==
The squadron was formed at half strength at Hyakuri Air Base in Ibaraki Prefecture on March 1, 1966. After 18 months it had the required 18 aircraft and in August 1967 it began Quick Reaction Alert flights. These continued until September 1972. Following the return of Okinawa Prefecture to Japanese control in 1972, the squadron relocated to Naha Air Base. In March 1986 it disbanded, the final F-104J unit to do so.

== Aircraft operated ==
=== Fighter aircraft ===
- Lockheed F-104J/DJ (1966-1987)

== See also ==
- Fighter units of the Japan Air Self-Defense Force
