= 302nd Tactical Fighter Squadron (Japan) =

- 第302飛行隊
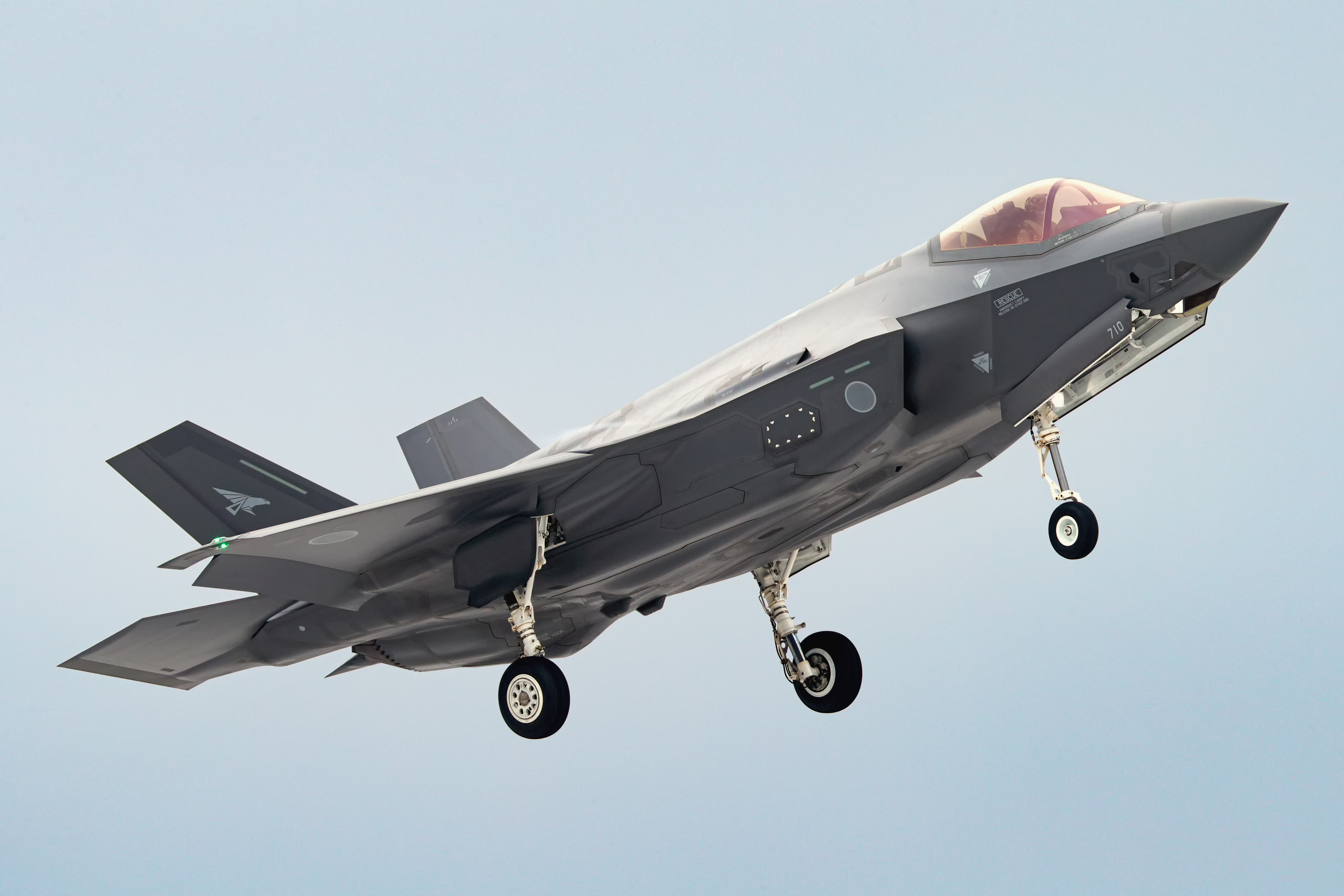
- Active: October 1, 1974 – present
- Country: Japan
- Branch: Japan Air Self-Defense Force
- Part of: Northern Air Defense Force, 3rd Air Wing
- Garrison/HQ: Misawa Air Base

Aircraft flown
- Fighter: Lockheed Martin F-35A Lightning II
- Trainer: Kawasaki T-4

The 302nd Tactical Fighter Squadron 第302飛行隊 (dai-sanbyaku-ni-hikoutai) is a squadron of the 3rd Air Wing of the Japan Air Self-Defense Force (JASDF) based at Misawa Air Base in Aomori Prefecture in northern Japan. It is equipped with Lockheed Martin F-35A Lightning II and Kawasaki T-4 aircraft.

Along with the 301st Tactical Fighter Squadron, the 302nd is responsible for air defense of the Tokyo Metropolitan area.

== History ==
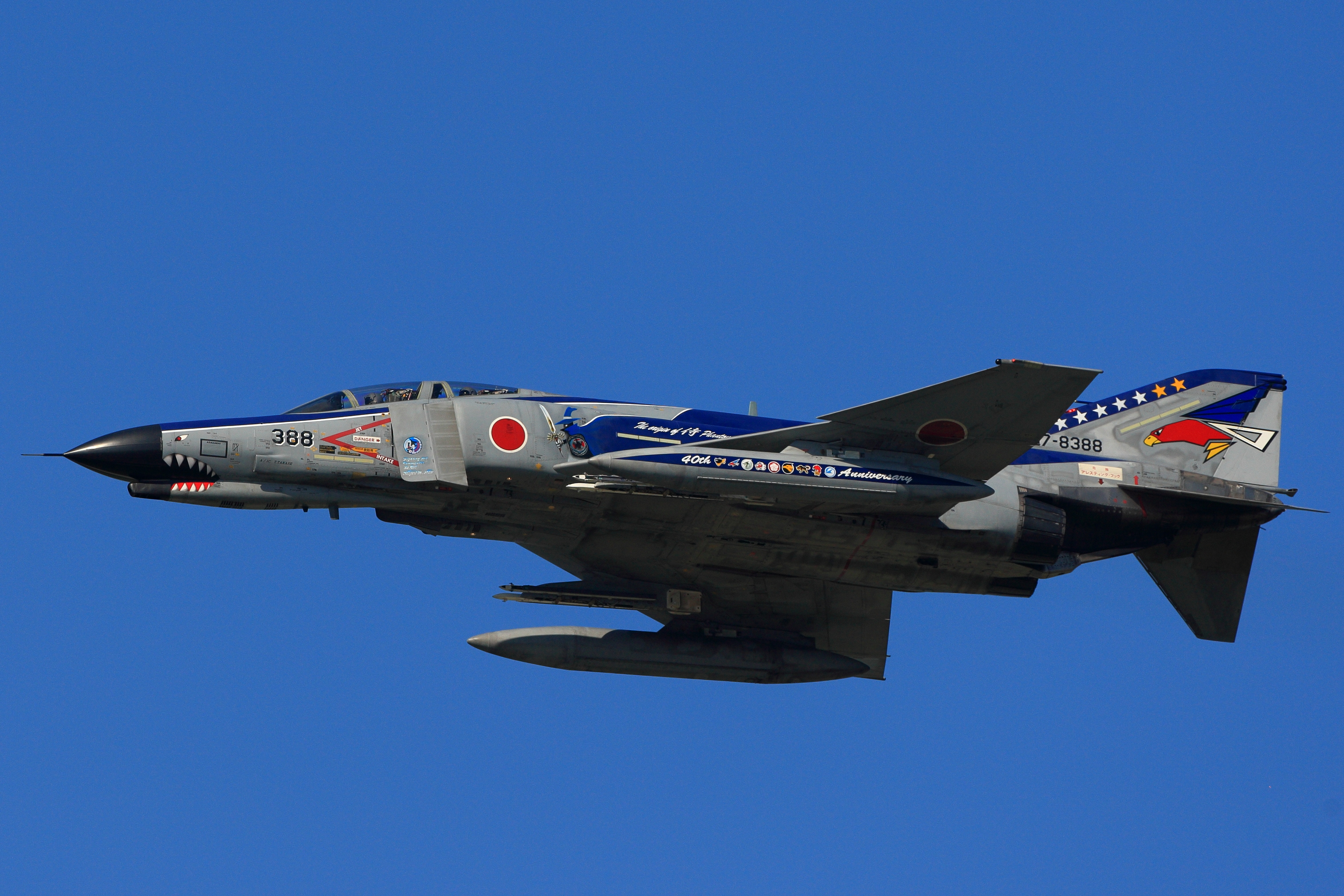
F-4EJ Kai in 7th Air Wing's 40th anniversary livery (2012)

The squadron was formed on October 1, 1974 at Chitose Air Base in Hokkaido as the second of the JASDF's F-4 Phantom squadrons. It was the first operational unit to operate the F-4, the 301st being the first training unit. It also operated Lockheed T-33A trainer/liaison aircraft.

On September 6, 1976 two F-4EJ's of the squadron were scrambled from Chitose to intercept the MiG-25 of Viktor Belenko who had flown into Japanese territory to defect. They were unable to intercept him, which led to changes in the Japanese air defense system.

On November 26, 1985 the squadron transferred to Naha Air Base in Okinawa.

On December 9, 1987 an F-4EJ operated by the squadron flying from Naha fired warning shots on two occasions when a Tupolev Tu-16 of the Soviet Air Force entered Japanese air space over Okinawa. This was the first time an SDF fighter had fired warning shots at an intruding aircraft.

In 1992 the T-33A trainers were replaced by Kawasaki T-4 aircraft.

In 1995 the squadron finished upgrading to the F-4EJ Kai (improved) version.

In November 2007 the JASDF's F-15 Eagle fleet was grounded. During this time the squadron's F-4s were required to scramble.

On March 13, 2009 the squadron finished relocating from Naha Air Base to Hyakuri Air Base in Ibaraki prefecture north of Tokyo, swapping with the F-15J equipped 204th Tactical Fighter Squadron which moved to Naha. Following this, on March 26 of the same year the 302nd was transferred to the 7th Air Wing of the Central Air Defense Force.

In January 2016 after North Korea claimed to have exploded a hydrogen bomb, a squadron T-4 aircraft was one of the aircraft were used to test for radioactive particles. The flights were done for around 14 days. The flights didn't detect any radioactive particles.

As the sole remaining F-4 fighter squadrons, either the 302nd squadron or the 301st was expected to be the first JASDF squadron to operate the Lockheed Martin F-35A Lightning II. In August 2017 it was announced that the 302nd squadron would be the first in the JASDF to transition to the F-35.

On October 18, 2017 F-4EJ Kai Phantom II 87-8408 of the squadron caught fire on the ground after its landing gear malfunctioned. There were no injuries.

The squadron ceased flying the F-4 in March 2019, and in the same month relocated to Misawa Air Base.

On April 9, 2019 an F-35A of the squadron went missing over the Pacific Ocean.

== Tail markings ==
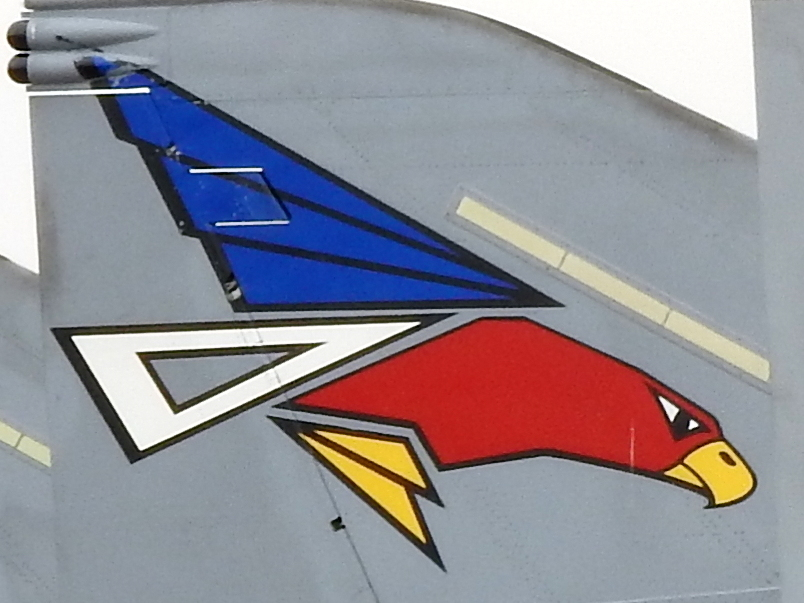
Tail marking (2016)

The squadron's emblem is a stylized image of a white-tailed eagle, a raptor which resides in Japan. It is famous among JASDF fighter squadrons as being the largest tail marking. There is a rule that a squadron's tail marking can not be larger than the Hinomaru used as a roundel by Japanese military aircraft, but this rule did not exist when the 302nd's emblem was created. The eagle is designed to resemble the squadron's number, with the wings having three lines, the tail being a zero, and the two feet completing the number.

== Aircraft operated ==
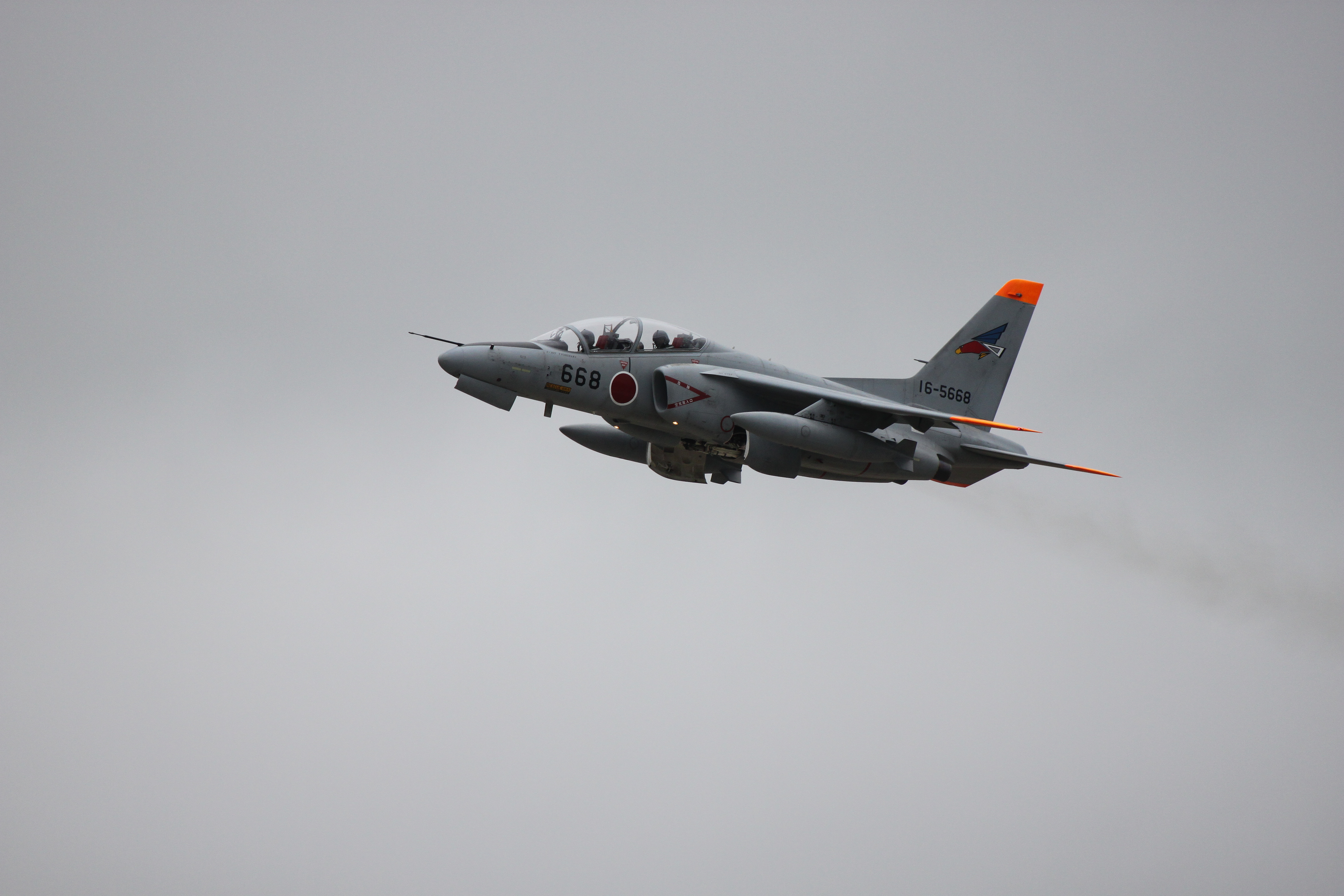
302 Sqn Kawasaki T-4 (2010)

=== Fighter aircraft ===
- F-4EJ (1974–1992)
- F-4EJ Kai (1992–2019)
- Lockheed Martin F-35A Lightning II (2019–present)

=== Liaison aircraft ===
- T-33A (1974–1994)
- T-4 (1992–present)

== See also ==
- Fighter units of the Japan Air Self-Defense Force
