= 201st Tactical Fighter Squadron (JASDF) =

- 第201飛行隊
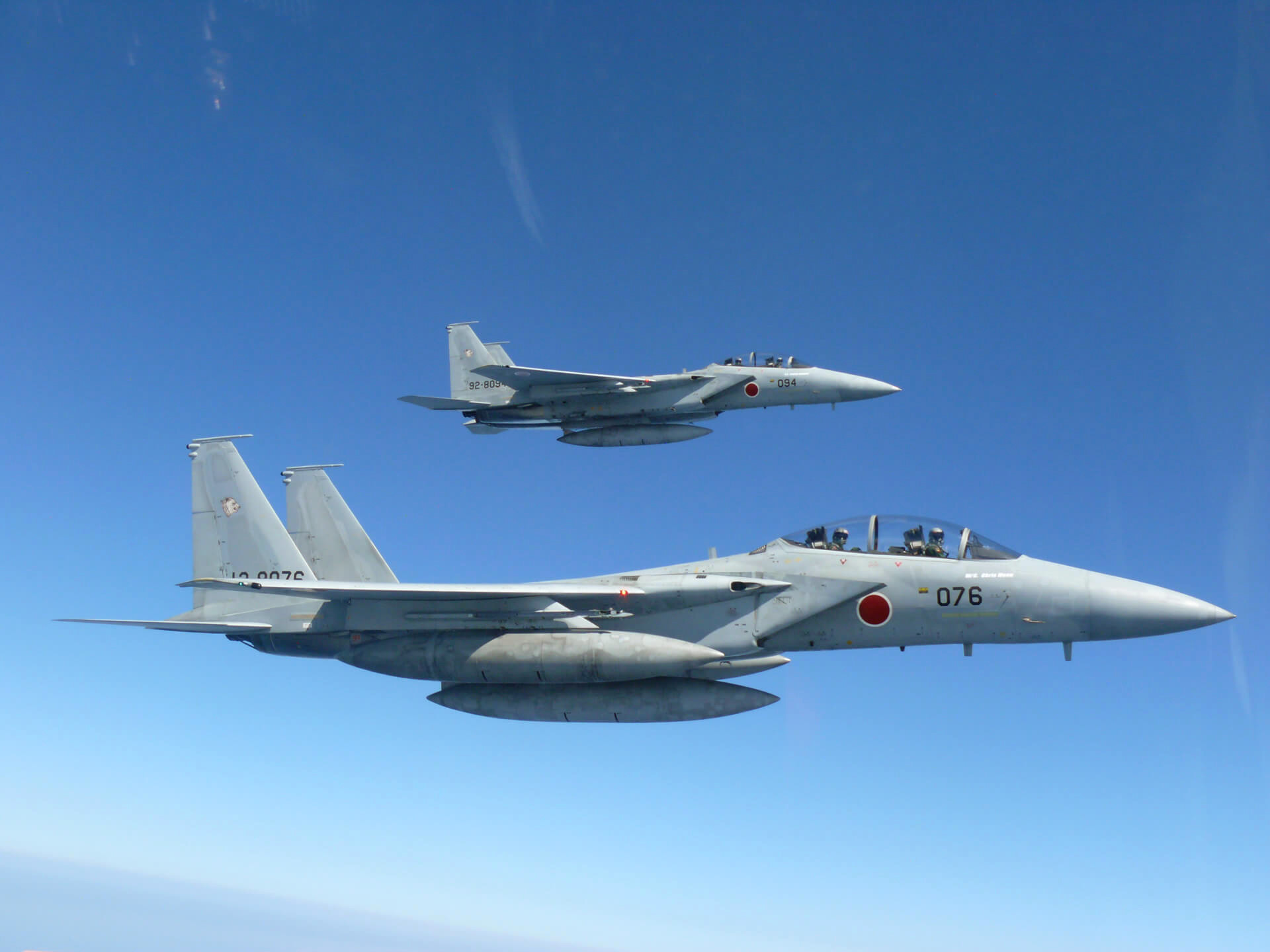
- 201 Sqn Mitsubishi F-15DJs
- Active: (March 5, 1963 – October 1, 1974) (March 19, 1986–present)
- Country: Japan
- Branch: Japan Air Self-Defense Force
- Part of: Northern Air Defense Force, 2nd Air Wing
- Garrison/HQ: Chitose Air Base

Aircraft flown
- Fighter: Mitsubishi F-15J/DJ
- Trainer: Kawasaki T-4

The 201st Tactical Fighter Squadron (第201飛行隊 (dai-ni-hyaku-ichi-hikoutai)) is a squadron of the 2nd Air Wing of the Japan Air Self-Defense Force (JASDF) based at Chitose Air Base, in Hokkaido Prefecture, Japan. It is equipped with Mitsubishi F-15J/DJ and Kawasaki T-4 aircraft.

== History ==
The squadron was formed at Chitose Air Base at Hokkaido in March 1963 as part of the 2nd Air Wing. Initially the squadron was responsible for training and interception duties, but later it focused exclusively on interception.

The squadron was disbanded in 1974, when it was replaced by the 302nd Tactical Fighter Squadron equipped with the McDonnell Douglas F-4EJ. Until the 1980s JASDF fighter squadron numbers were linked to the type of aircraft they operated. The 200-series squadrons were F-104 squadrons and the 300-squadrons were F-4EJ squadrons.

With the intensification of the Cold War in the 1980s the squadron was re-formed and equipped with F-15s.

== Tail markings ==
During the squadron's F-104 era the tail marking was a "201". After the squadron was re-formed with the F-15 the tail marking became a brown bear. Brown bears are common in Hokkaido.

== Aircraft operated ==
=== Fighter aircraft ===
- Lockheed F-104J/DJ Starfighter (1963–1974)
- Mitsubishi F-15J (1986–present)

=== Liaison aircraft ===
- Lockheed T-33A (1963–1974) (1986–1994)
- Kawasaki T-4 (1992–present)

== In popular culture ==
The squadron appeared in the 1990 film Best Guy.

== See also ==
- Fighter units of the Japan Air Self-Defense Force
