= 102nd Squadron (JASDF) =

- 第102飛行隊
- Active: March 1, 1959
- Disbanded: December 1, 1967
- Country: Japan
- Branch: Japan Air Self-Defense Force
- Part of: Central Air Defense Force, 3rd Air Wing
- Garrison/HQ: Komaki Air Base

Aircraft flown
- Fighter: North American F-86D Sabre

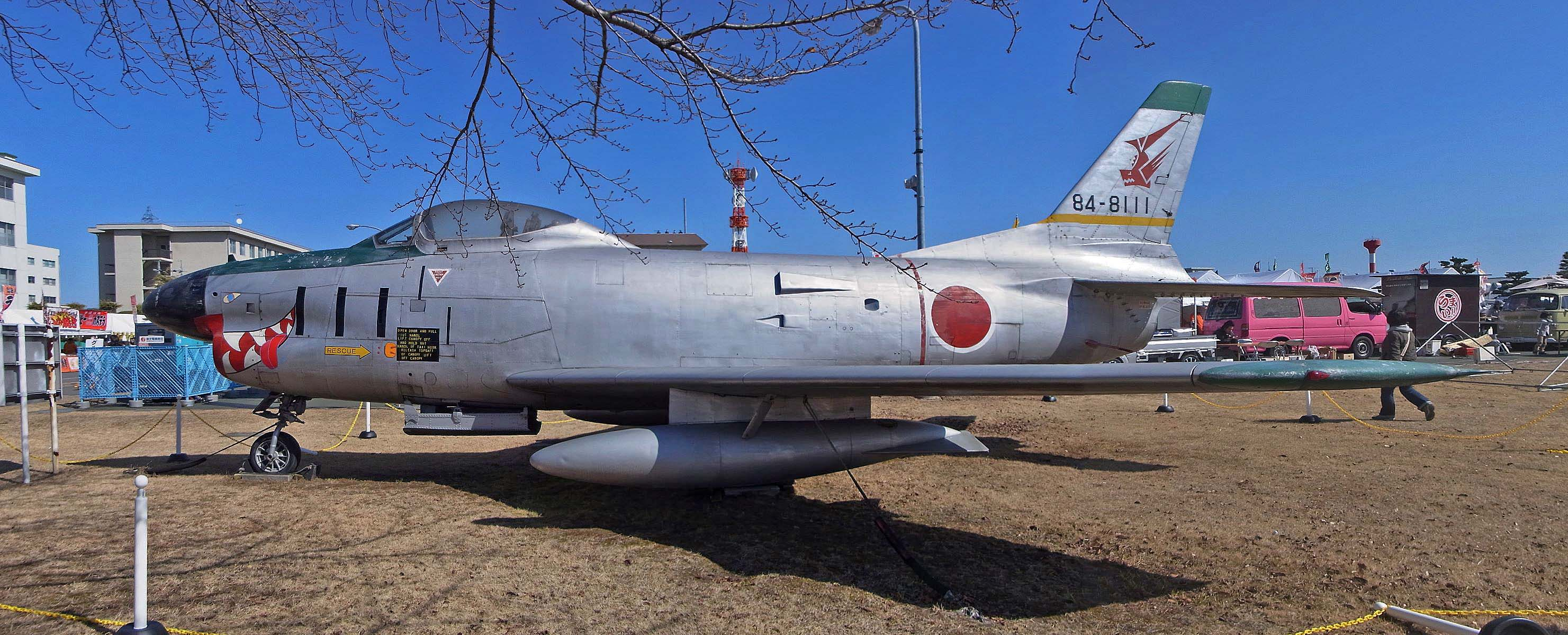
F-86D JASDF

The 102nd Squadron (第102飛行隊 (dai-ichi-zero-ni-hikoutai)) was a squadron of the 3rd Air Wing of the Japan Air Self-Defense Force (JASDF) based at Komaki Air Base in Aichi Prefecture, Japan. It was equipped with North American F-86D Sabre aircraft.

== History ==
On March 1, 1959 the squadron was formed at Komaki Air Base. It was the JASDF's first frontline all-weather fighter squadron, as the 101st Squadron was a training squadron for most of its existence.

It was disbanded on December 1, 1967, on the same day as fellow Komaki unit, the 105th Squadron. At that time, the 101st through 105th Squadrons were F-86D squadrons.

== Aircraft operated ==
=== Fighter aircraft ===
- North American F-86D Sabre（1958-1968）

== See also ==
- Fighter units of the Japan Air Self-Defense Force
