= Fighter units of the Japan Air Self-Defense Force =

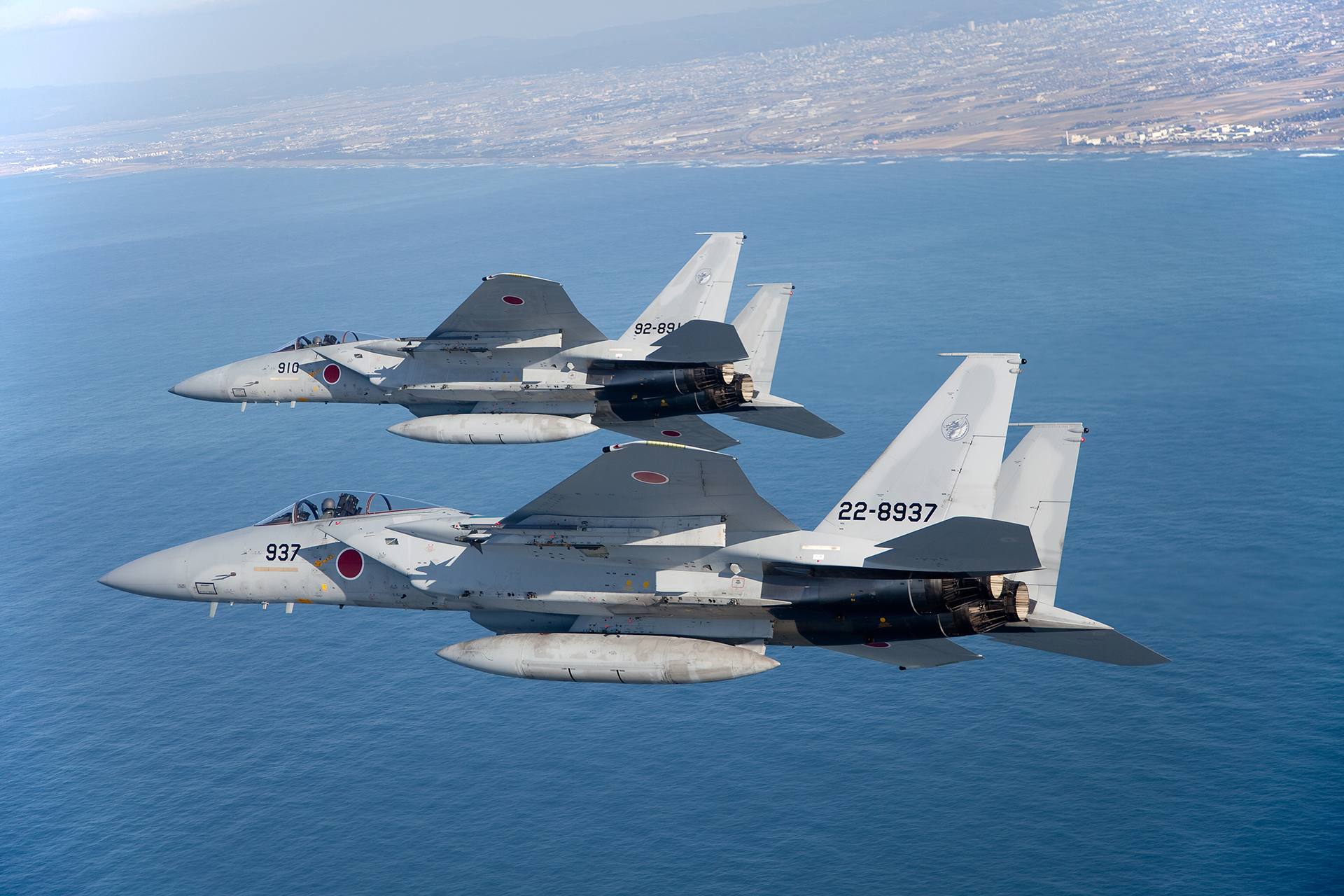
Two F-15Js in flight; these aircraft equip seven JASDF fighter squadrons

Fighter units of the Japan Air Self-Defense Force are squadrons of fighter aircraft dedicated to the defense of Japan. As Article 9 of the Japanese Constitution states that the country renounces war, JASDF fighter squadrons have never been deployed in combat overseas.

One of the main activities of JASDF fighter squadrons is providing Quick Reaction Alert intercepts to Chinese and Russian aircraft nearing or violating Japanese airspace. In 2016 Japan Air Self-Defense Force aircraft launched 851 times to intercept Chinese aircraft and 301 times in response to Russian aircraft.

It has never been required to engage in combat to protect Japan. The closest the JASDF has ever come to combat was in 1987 when it fired warning shots near a Soviet Tu-16 that was violating Japanese airspace.

As of 2019 there are 12 JASDF fighter squadrons in existence. In December 2013 it was announced that the number would be increased to 13.

== Background ==
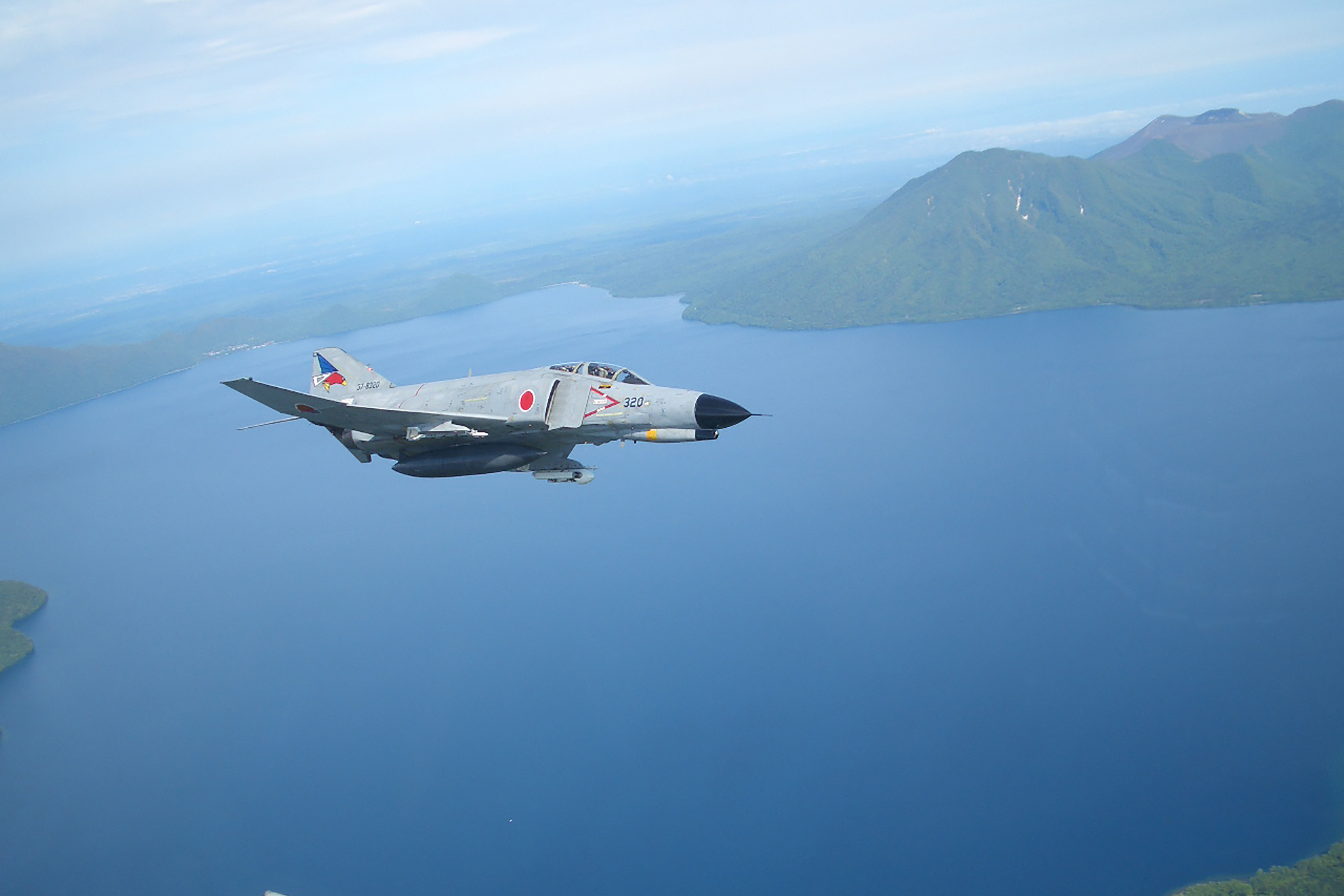
F-4EJ Kai in flight.

During the Imperial period until 1945 the Imperial Japanese Army and Imperial Japanese Navy had operated their own air services, the Imperial Japanese Navy Air Service and the Imperial Japanese Army Air Service. There was no independent Imperial Japanese Air Force. During the post-war occupation from 1945–1952 there was no Japanese military, with security for the country being provided by the occupation forces. Even afterwards, US forces based in the country continued to provide security for Japan.

== Establishment of the SDF ==
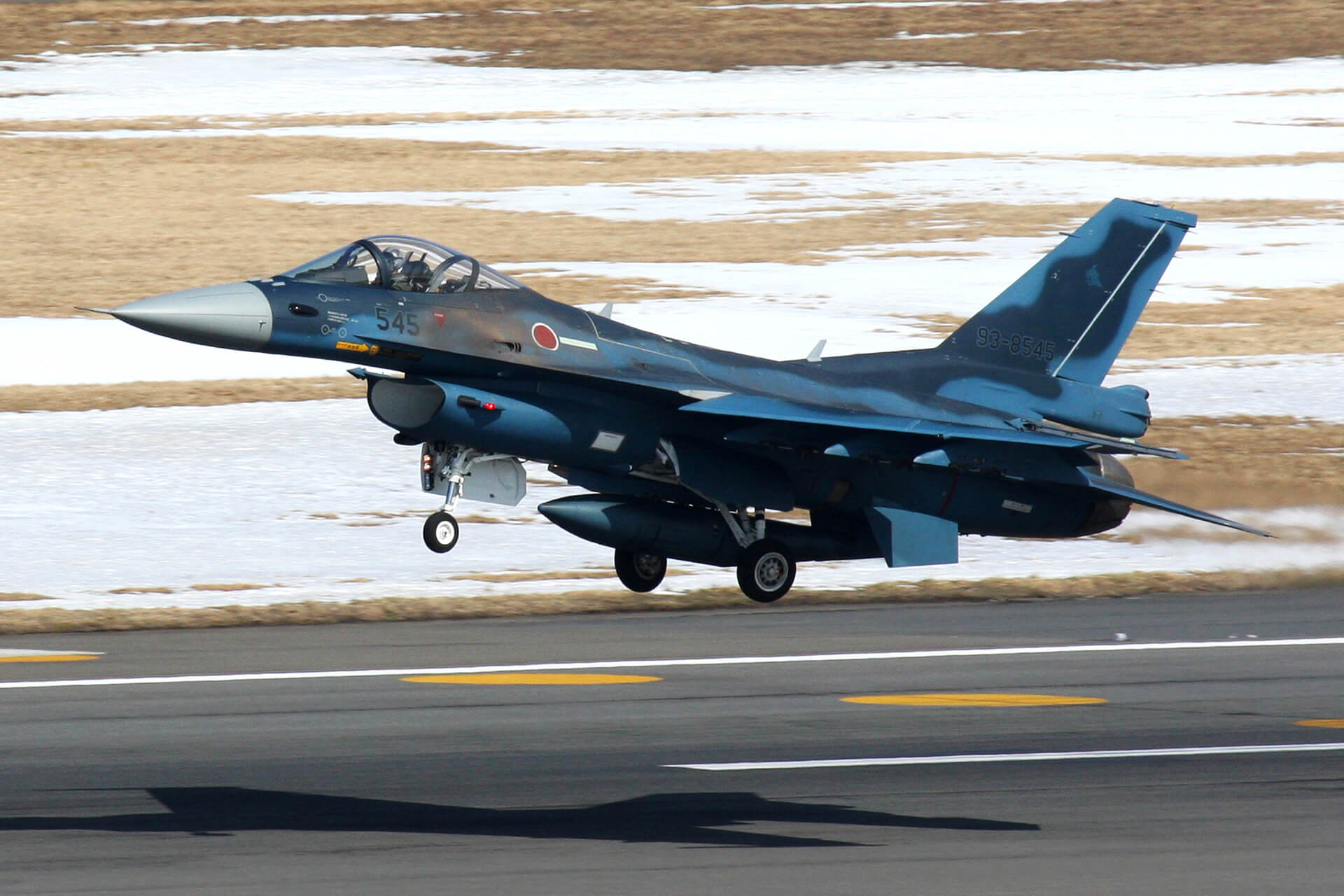
An F-2 fighter taking off; three squadrons deploy them

In 1954 the Self-Defense Forces law was passed by Japan's National Diet and on July 1, 1954 the Japan Air Self-Defense Force was founded. The first JASDF fighter squadron, (the 1st Squadron) was founded at Hamamatsu Air Base in Shizuoka Prefecture on January 10, 1956 with F-86F Sabre aircraft.

== Aircraft used ==
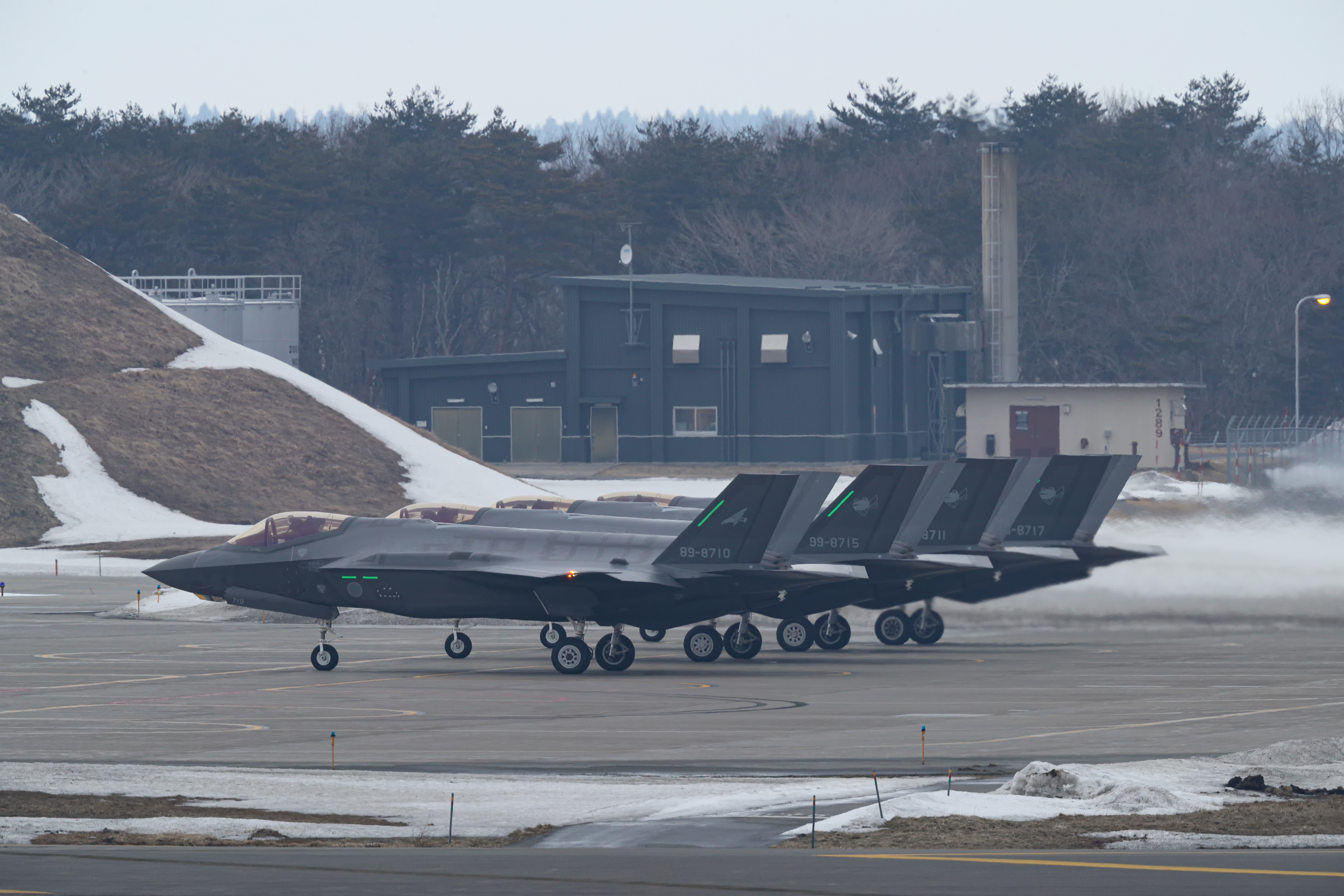
F-35A aircraft at Misawa Air Base

During the Imperial era the Japanese air services largely used Japanese fighter aircraft made by companies such as Kawasaki Aerospace Company, Mitsubishi Heavy Industries and Nakajima Aircraft Company. After the war surviving Japanese aircraft were mostly scrapped and aviation manufacturing capability was destroyed. When the new SDF's air capacity was initially established it was with surplus American aircraft left over from World War II.

When the JASDF's fighter capacity was to be re-established Japan had no capacity to design its own fighters, so US F-86F aircraft were purchased and Mitsubishi license-built 300 of them, along with the F-86D model. In the postwar era Mitsubishi has been the main corporation responsible for Japan's fighters. In addition to the F-86s it also license-built F-104J/DJ, F-4EJ and F-15J/DJ aircraft. In addition it has designed and built the Mitsubishi F-1 and Mitsubishi F-2 aircraft.

The JASDF was interested in obtaining the twin-engine Lockheed Martin F-22 Raptor to replace the F-4 and F-15, but when this was not possible it settled on the F-35. Mitsubishi is currently involved in assembling the F-35A.

In addition to their fighters, JASDF squadrons also operate up to six trainer aircraft. Originally these were Lockheed T-33As, but from 1988 they were replaced by the Kawasaki T-4.

Mitsubishi also worked on the X-2 Shinshin as what many consider to be Japan's first stealth fighter.

== Squadron numbering ==
From the 1950s to the 1970s the JASDF's fighter squadron numbering system was based on the type of aircraft it was equipped with. Squadrons 1–11 were F-86F squadrons, 100 numbers were F-86D, 200 numbers operated the F-104J/DJ, and 300 numbered squadrons the F-4EJ. For fighter aircraft after the F-4 (the F-1, F-15J/DJ and F-2A/B) new squadron number systems were not introduced.

As the F-1 and F-2 were designated as fighters with a ground support role they were allocated to single-digit squadrons that formerly operated F-86F aircraft. The F-86Fs had also been designated as ground support fighters.

== Current status ==
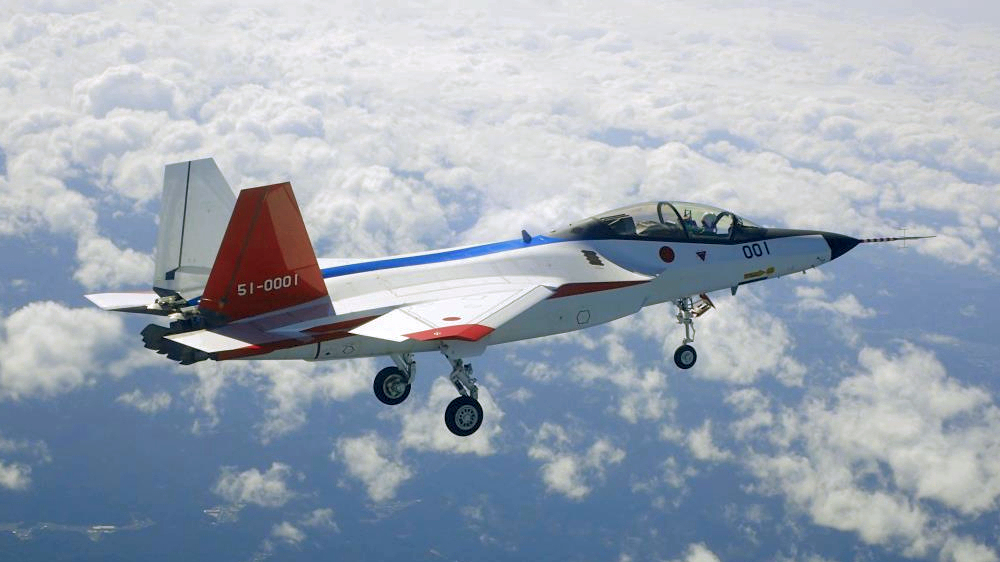
Mitsubishi X-2 Shinshin on its first flight on April 22, 2016

As of 2019 the Japan Air Self-Defense Force has 12 fighter squadrons. Seven of these fly the Mitsubishi F-15J, three fly the Mitsubishi F-2. As of 2023 the F4 phantom is out of service.

In 2019 the Lockheed Martin F-35A Lightning II began to enter service with JASDF fighter squadrons to replace the F-4s, beginning with 302nd Tactical Fighter Squadron.

The Mitsubishi X-2 Shinshin technology demonstrator was developed, and in the future Japan may purchase a new F-22/F-35 hybrid aircraft.

== Squadrons ==
=== Current ===
Northern Air Defense Force

- 2nd Air Wing (Chitose Air Base, Chitose City, Hokkaido Prefecture)
  - 201st Tactical Fighter Squadron (1963–present)(F-15J/DJ)
  - 203rd Tactical Fighter Squadron (1964–present)(F-15J/DJ)
- 3rd Air Wing (Misawa Air Base, Misawa City, Aomori Prefecture)
  - 301st Tactical Fighter Squadron (1974–present)(F-35A)
  - 302nd Tactical Fighter Squadron (1974–present)(F-35A)

Central Air Defense Force

- 6th Air Wing (Komatsu Air Base, Komatsu City, Ishikawa Prefecture)
  - 303rd Tactical Fighter Squadron (1976–present)(F-15J/DJ/F-35A)
  - 306th Tactical Fighter Squadron (1981–present)(F-15J/DJ)
- 7th Air Wing (Hyakuri Air Base, Omitama City, Ibaraki Prefecture)
  - 3rd Tactical Fighter Squadron (1956–present)(F-2A/B)
- 5th Air Wing (Nyutabaru Air Base, Shintomi City, Koyu District, Miyazaki Prefecture)
  - 305th Tactical Fighter Squadron (1978–present)(F-15J/DJ)
- 8th Air Wing (Tsuiki Air Field, Chikujō City, Chikujō District, Fukuoka Prefecture)
  - 6th Tactical Fighter Squadron (1958–present)(F-2A/B)
  - 8th Tactical Fighter Squadron (1960–present)(F-2A/B)

Southwestern Air Defense Force

- 9th Air Wing (Naha Air Base, Naha, Okinawa Prefecture)
  - 204th Tactical Fighter Squadron (1964–present)(F-15J/DJ)
  - 304th Tactical Fighter Squadron (1977–present)(F-15J/DJ)

=== Disbanded ===
- 1st Squadron (F-86F) (1956–1979)
- 2nd Squadron (F-86F) (1956–1965)
- 4th Squadron (F-86F) (1957–1975)
- 5th Squadron (F-86F) (1957–1971)
- 7th Squadron (F-86F) (1960–1977)
- 9th Squadron (F-86F) (1961–1965)
- 10th Squadron (F-86F) (1962–1977)
- 11th Squadron (F-86F) – no longer a fighter squadron, became the Blue Impulse aerobatics team.
- 101st Squadron (F-86D) (1958–1968)
- 102nd Squadron (F-86D) (1959–1967)
- 103rd Squadron (F-86D) (1960–1968)
- 105th Squadron (F-86D) (1962–1967)
- 202nd Tactical Fighter Squadron (F-104J/DJ, F-15J/DJ) (1964–2000)
- 205th Tactical Fighter Squadron (F-104J/DJ) (1965–1981)
- 206th Tactical Fighter Squadron (F-104J/DJ) (1965–1978)
- 207th Tactical Fighter Squadron (F-104J/DJ) (1966–1986)

== Aircraft operated ==
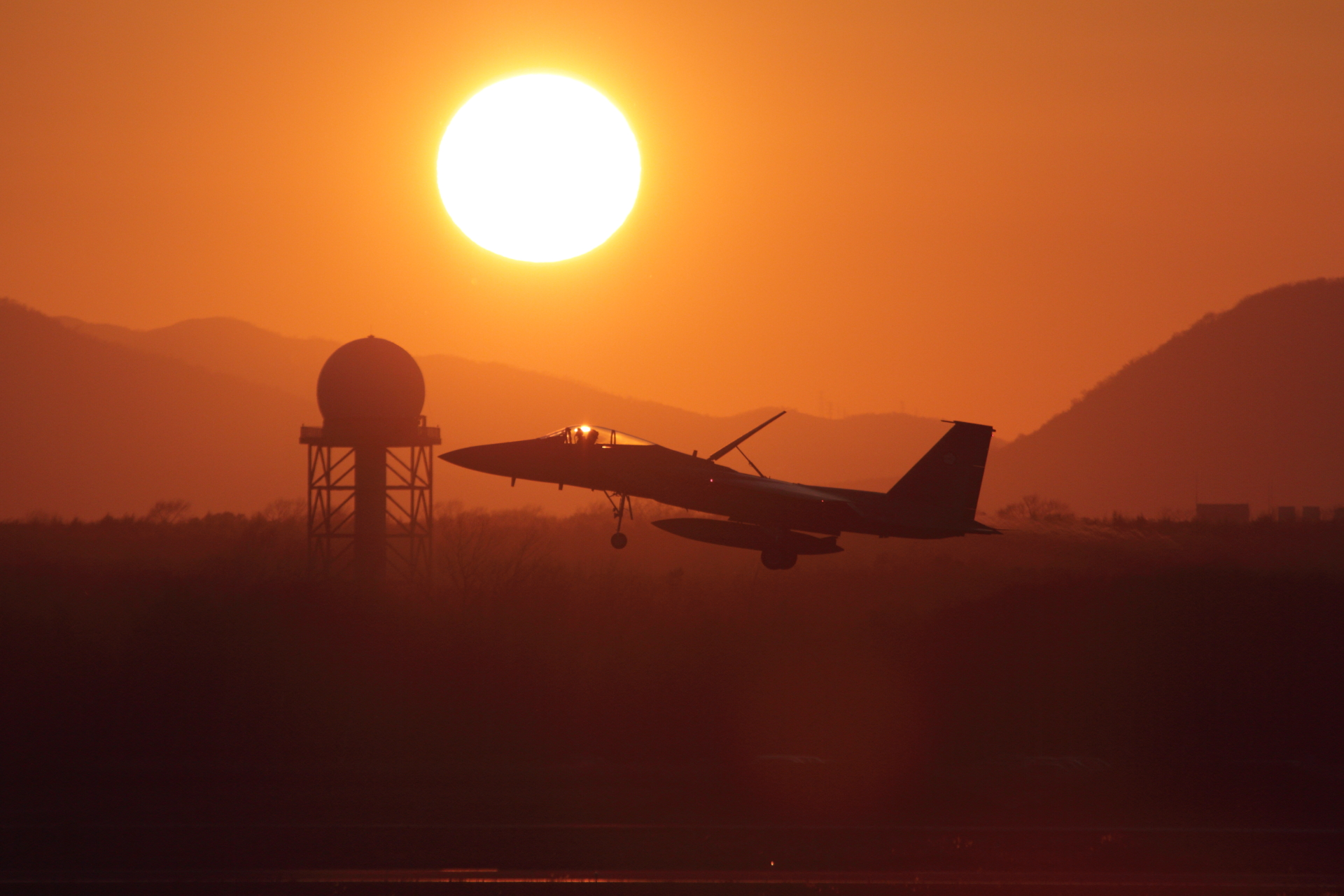
F-15J at Chitose Air Base (2010)

- North American F-86F (1955–1979)
- North American F-86D (1958–1968)
- Lockheed F-104J/DJ (1962–1986)
- Mitsubishi F-1 (1978–2006)
- McDonnell Douglas F-4EJ (1973–1993)
- McDonnell Douglas F-4EJ Kai (1989–2021)
- Mitsubishi F-15J/DJ (1983–present)
- Mitsubishi F-2A/B (2000–present)
- Lockheed Martin F-35A Lightning II (2019–present)
