= 4th Squadron (JASDF) =

- 第4飛行隊
- Active: February 1, 1957
- Disbanded: June 30, 1975
- Country: Japan
- Branch: Japan Air Self-Defense Force
- Part of: Central Air Defense Force, 6th Air Wing
- Garrison/HQ: Komatsu Air Base

Aircraft flown
- Fighter: North American F-86F Sabre

The 4th Squadron (第4飛行隊 (dai-yon-hikoutai)) was a squadron of the 6th Air Wing of the Japan Air Self-Defense Force based at Komatsu Air Base, in Ishikawa Prefecture, Japan. It was equipped with North American F-86F Sabre aircraft.

== History ==
On February 1, 1957 (the same day as the 5th Squadron) the squadron was formed at Hamamatsu Air Base in Shizuoka Prefecture as part of the 2nd Air Wing. Six months later it transferred to Chitose Air Base in Hokkaido Prefecture. In 1961 it transferred to Komatsu in Ishikawa Prefecture. It was temporarily based at Tsuiki Air Base in Fukuoka Prefecture in 1973.

It was disbanded on June 20, 1975, and was replaced by the 303rd Squadron equipped with the McDonnell Douglas F-4EJ Phantom II. At that time the type of aircraft operated by a Japanese fighter squadron was linked to the type of aircraft operated. Squadrons 1-11 were F-86F squadrons.

== Aircraft operated ==
=== Fighter aircraft ===
- North American F-86F Sabre（1957-1975）

== See also ==
- Fighter units of the Japan Air Self-Defense Force
