= 103rd Squadron (JASDF) =

102nd Squadron
- 第102飛行隊
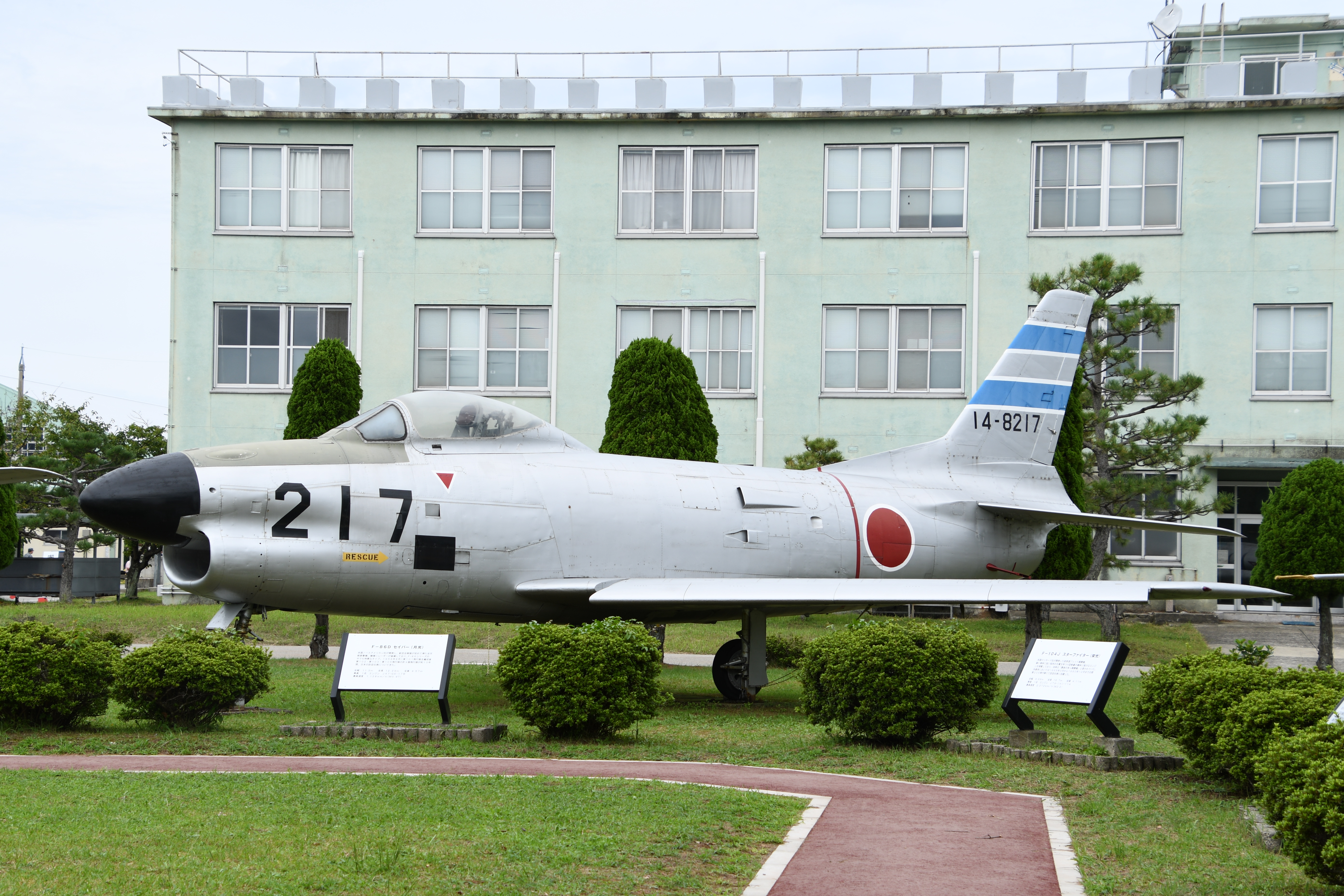
- 103rd Sqn North American F-86D
- Active: March 1, 1960
- Disbanded: October 1, 1968
- Country: Japan
- Branch: Japan Air Self-Defense Force
- Part of: Northern Air Defense Force, 2nd Air Wing
- Garrison/HQ: Komaki Air Base

Aircraft flown
- Fighter: North American F-86D Sabre

The 103rd Squadron (第103飛行隊 (dai-ichi-zero-san-hikoutai)) was a squadron of the 2nd Air Wing of the Japan Air Self-Defense Force (JASDF) based at Chitose Air Base in Hokkaido Prefecture, Japan. It was equipped with North American F-86D Sabre aircraft.

== History ==
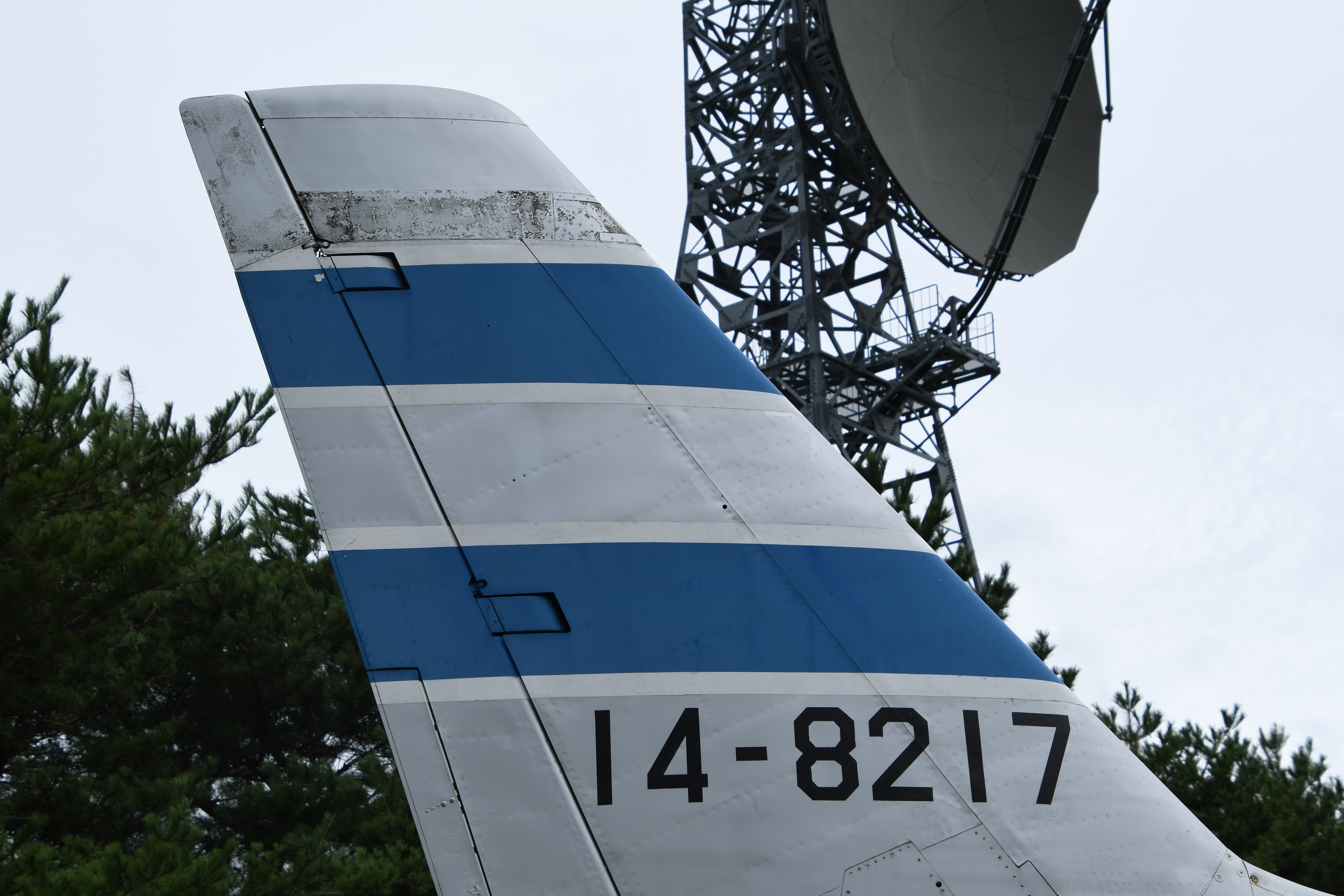
Tail marking

On March 1, 1960 the squadron was formed at Komaki Air Base as part of the 3rd Air Wing. It moved to Chitose Air Base in 1961 and did Quick Reaction Alert duty for two years, until December 1963. The following year the 203rd Squadron was formed flying the Lockheed F-104 Starfighter.

It was disbanded on October 1, 1968, the same day as the 101st Squadron. At that time, the 101st through 105th Squadrons used F-86D fighters.

== Aircraft operated ==
=== Fighter aircraft ===
- North American F-86D Sabre（1960-1968）

== See also ==
- Fighter units of the Japan Air Self-Defense Force
