= 5th Squadron (JASDF) =

- 第5飛行隊
- Active: February 1, 1957
- Disbanded: July 1, 1971
- Country: Japan
- Branch: Japan Air Self-Defense Force
- Part of: Central Air Defense Force, 4th Air Wing
- Garrison/HQ: Matsushima Air Base

Aircraft flown
- Fighter: North American F-86F Sabre

The 5th Squadron (第5飛行隊 (dai-go-hikoutai)) was a squadron of the 4th Air Wing of the Japan Air Self-Defense Force based at Matsushima Air Base, in Iwate Prefecture, Japan. It was equipped with North American F-86F Sabre aircraft.

== History ==
On February 1, 1957, the 5th Squadron, along with the 4th, were formed at Hamamatsu Air Base in Shizuoka Prefecture as part of the 1st Air Wing. Over 1957 and 1958 it transferred to Matsushima Air Base in Iwate Prefecture, and served as a training squadron. From March 1, 1962, it became a regular frontline squadron.

It was disbanded on July 1, 1971. At that time the type, the 1st through 11th Squadrons used F-86F fighters.

== Aircraft operated ==
=== Fighter aircraft ===
- North American F-86F Sabre（1957-1971）

== See also ==
- Fighter units of the Japan Air Self-Defense Force
