= 7th Squadron (JASDF) =

- 第7飛行隊
- Active: February 1, 1960
- Disbanded: June 30, 1977
- Country: Japan
- Branch: Japan Air Self-Defense Force
- Part of: Central Air Defense Force, 4th Air Wing
- Garrison/HQ: Matsushima Air Base

Aircraft flown
- Fighter: North American F-86F Sabre

The 7th Squadron (第7飛行隊 (dai-shichi-hikoutai)) was a squadron of the 4th Air Wing of the Japan Air Self-Defense Force based at Matsushima Air Base, in Iwate Prefecture, Japan. It was equipped with North American F-86F Sabre aircraft.

== History ==
On February 1, 1960, the squadron was formed at Matsushima Air Base in Iwate Prefecture as part of the 5th Air Wing. On July 1, 1960, it transferred to the 4th Air Wing. It was a frontline squadron until the 4th Air Wing became responsible for training on August 23, 1973.

It was disbanded on June 30, 1970. Squadrons 1-11 were F-86F squadrons.

== Aircraft operated ==
=== Fighter aircraft ===
- North American F-86F Sabre（1960-1977）

== See also ==
- Fighter units of the Japan Air Self-Defense Force
