= 203rd Tactical Fighter Squadron (JASDF) =

Unit of the Japan Air Self-Defense Force

- 第203飛行隊
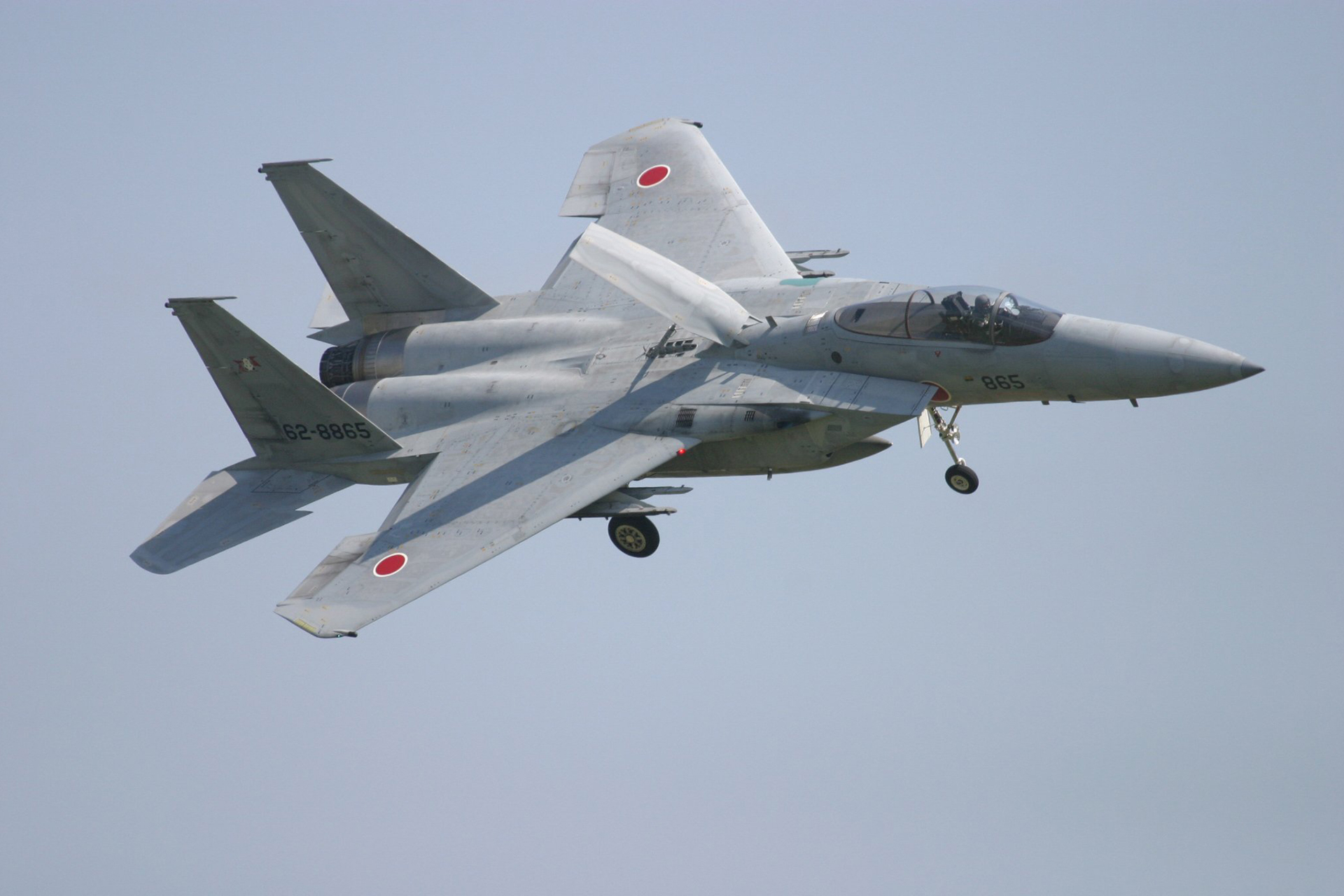
- 203 Sqn Mitsubishi F-15J
- Active: June 25, 1964 – present
- Country: Japan
- Branch: Japan Air Self-Defense Force
- Part of: Northern Air Defense Force, 2nd Air Wing
- Garrison/HQ: Chitose Air Base
- Nickname: Secret Eagles

Aircraft flown
- Fighter: Mitsubishi F-15J/DJ
- Trainer: Kawasaki T-4

The 203rd Tactical Fighter Squadron (第203飛行隊 (dai-ni-hyaku-san-hikoutai)) is a squadron of the 2nd Air Wing of the Japan Air Self-Defense Force (JASDF) based at Chitose Air Base, in Hokkaido Prefecture, Japan. It is equipped with Mitsubishi F-15J/DJ and Kawasaki T-4 aircraft.

== History ==
The squadron was formed at Chitose Air Base at Hokkaido in June 1964 as part of the 2nd Air Wing. It was the third of the JASDF's F-104 units to form. It took over Quick Reaction Alert duties from the North American F-86D Sabre-equipped 103rd Squadron.

On March 24, 1984, the squadron updated from the F-104 to the F-15J/DJ.

== Tail markings ==
The squadron's aircraft have a stylized 203 with a red line, and a bear resembling a panda.

== Aircraft operated ==
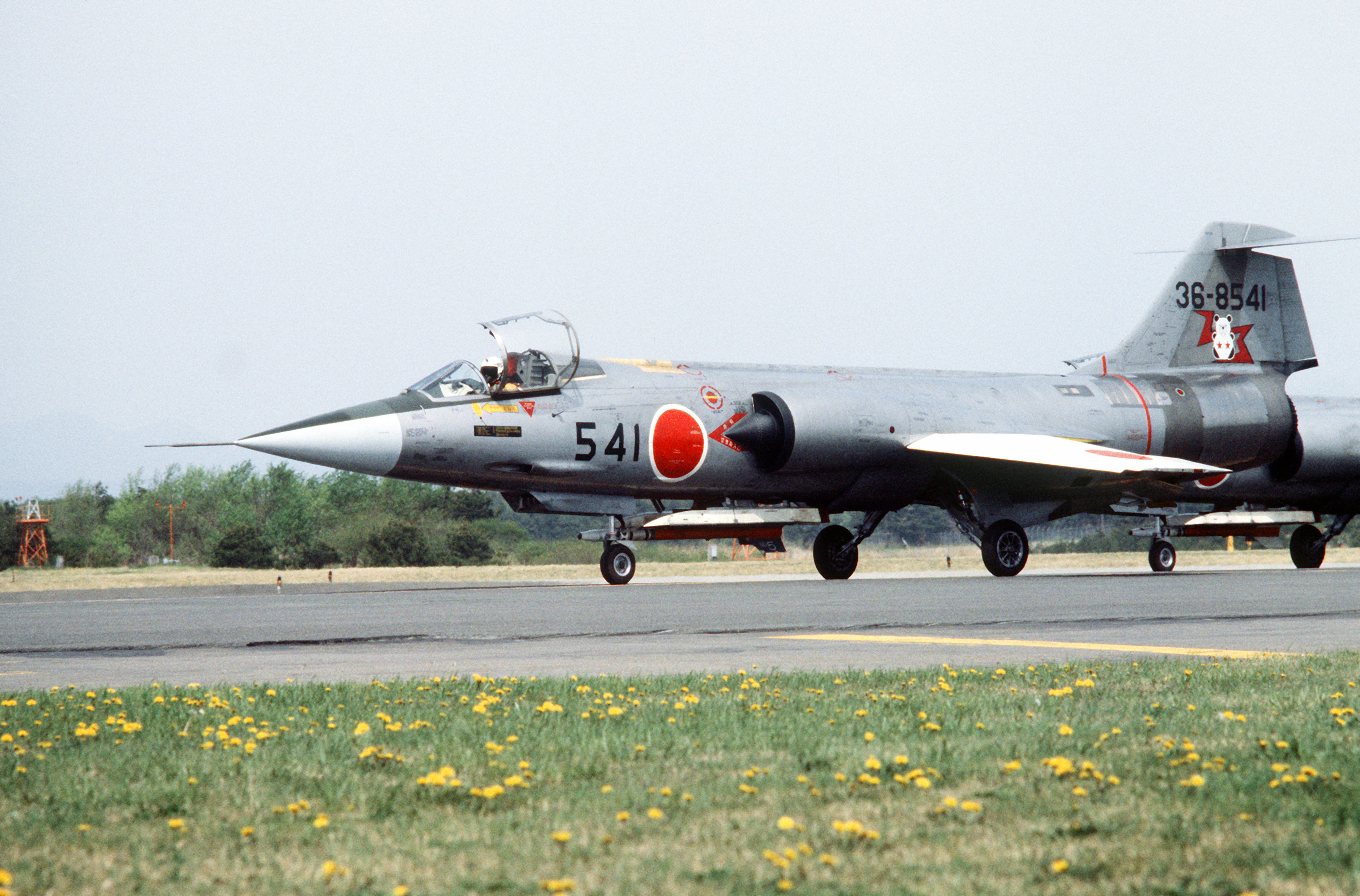
203rd Sqn F-104J (1982)

=== Fighter aircraft ===
- Lockheed F-104J/DJ Starfighter (1964–1983)
- Mitsubishi F-15J (1983–present)

=== Liaison aircraft ===
- Lockheed T-33A (1964–1992)
- Kawasaki T-4 (1992–present)

== In popular culture ==
The squadron appeared in the 1990 film Best Guy.

== See also ==
- Fighter units of the Japan Air Self-Defense Force
