= 2nd Squadron (JASDF) =

- 第2飛行隊
- Active: August 25, 1956
- Disbanded: November 20, 1965
- Country: Japan
- Branch: Japan Air Self-Defense Force
- Part of: Central Air Defense Force, 1st Air Wing
- Garrison/HQ: Hamamatsu Air Base

Aircraft flown
- Fighter: North American F-86F Sabre

The 2nd Squadron (第2飛行隊 (dai-ni-hikoutai)) was a squadron of the 1st Air Wing of the Japan Air Self-Defense Force based at Hamamatsu Air Base, in Shizuoka Prefecture, Japan. It was equipped with North American F-86F Sabre aircraft.

== History ==
On August 25, 1956 the squadron was formed at Hamamatsu Air Base in Shizuoka Prefecture. It was responsible for training pilots.

Five of its aircraft formed an aerobatic display unit. This was the predecessor unit to the current Blue Impulse team.

It was disbanded on November 20, 1965, with its duties taken over by 1st Squadron. Squadrons 1-11 were F-86F squadrons.

== Aircraft operated ==
=== Fighter aircraft ===
- North American F-86F Sabre（1956-1965）

== See also ==
- Fighter units of the Japan Air Self-Defense Force
