= 206th Tactical Fighter Squadron (JASDF) =

- 第206飛行隊
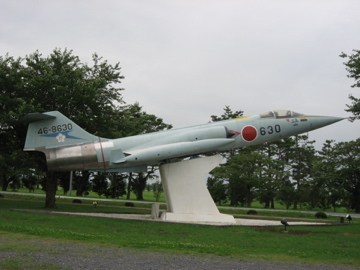
- Squadron F-104J preserved at Hyakuri Air Base
- Active: December 20, 1965-December 10, 1978
- Country: Japan
- Branch: Japan Air Self-Defense Force
- Part of: Central Air Defense Force, 7th Air Wing
- Garrison/HQ: Hyakuri Air Base

Aircraft flown
- Fighter: Lockheed F-104J/DJ

The 206th Tactical Fighter Squadron (第206飛行隊 (dai-ni-hyaku-roku-hikoutai)) was a squadron of the 7th Air Wing of the Japan Air Self-Defense Force. It was based at Hyakuri Air Base, in Ibaraki Prefecture, Japan. It was equipped with Lockheed F-104J/DJ aircraft. It was replaced by the Mitsubishi F-15J-equipped 306th Tactical Fighter Squadron.

== Tail marking ==
The squadron's tail marking was a plum blossom. The 305th Tactical Fighter Squadron continued the tradition by also using a plum blossom design on the tails of its aircraft.

== Aircraft operated ==
=== Fighter aircraft ===
- Lockheed F-104J/DJ (1965-1978)

== See also ==
- Fighter units of the Japan Air Self-Defense Force
