= 101st Squadron (JASDF) =

Japanese military unit

- 第101飛行隊
- Active: August 1, 1958
- Disbanded: October 1, 1968
- Country: Japan
- Branch: Japan Air Self-Defense Force
- Part of: Central Air Defense Force, 3rd Air Wing
- Garrison/HQ: Komaki Air Base

Aircraft flown
- Fighter: North American F-86D Sabre

The 101st Squadron (第101飛行隊 (dai-ichi-zero-ichi-hikoutai)) was a squadron of the 3rd Air Wing of the Japan Air Self-Defense Force (JASDF) based at Komaki Air Base in Aichi Prefecture, Japan. It was equipped with North American F-86D Sabre aircraft.

== History ==
On August 1, 1958 the squadron was formed at Gifu Air Field in Gifu Prefecture. Two months later it moved to Komaki Air Base in Aichi Prefecture. It was the JASDF's first all-weather fighter squadron. It was responsible for training pilots for most of its history. It was an interceptor squadron for the last year of its existence.

It was disbanded on October 1, 1968. At that time, the 101st through 105th Squadrons were F-86D squadrons.

== Aircraft operated ==
=== Fighter aircraft ===
- North American F-86D Sabre（1958-1968）

== See also ==
- Fighter units of the Japan Air Self-Defense Force
