= 301st Tactical Fighter Squadron (JASDF) =

- 第301飛行隊
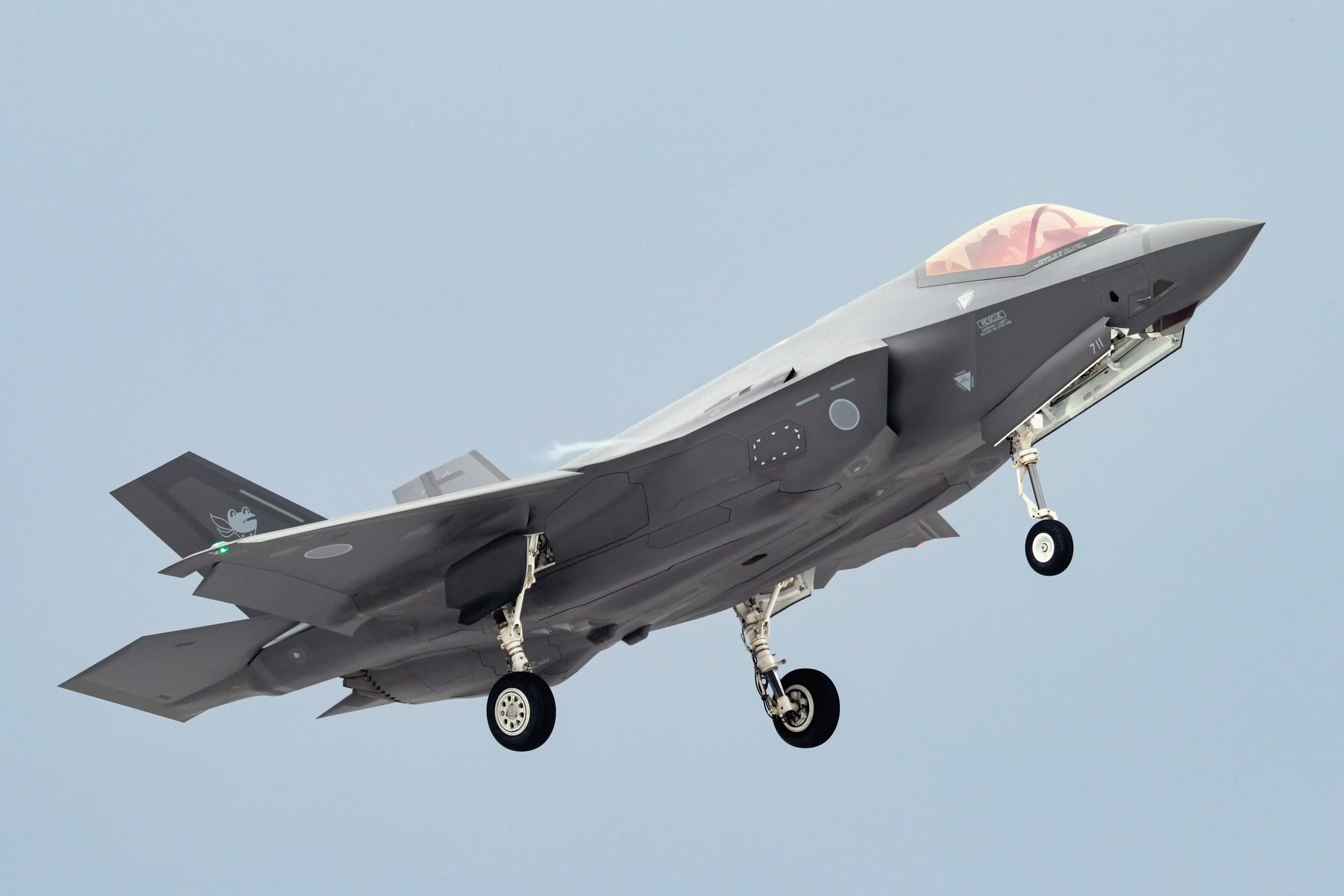
- 301st TFS F-35A 89-8711, March 2021
- Active: October 16, 1973 – present
- Country: Japan
- Branch: Japan Air Self-Defense Force
- Part of: 3rd Air Wing
- Garrison/HQ: Misawa Air Base

Aircraft flown
- Fighter: Mitsubishi F-35A Lightning II
- Trainer: Kawasaki T-4

The 301st Tactical Fighter Squadron (第301飛行隊 (dai-sann-byaku-ichi-hikoutai)) is a squadron of the 3rd Air Wing of the Japan Air Self-Defense Force based at Misawa Air Base in Misawa, Japan. It is equipped with Mitsubishi F-35A Lightning II and Kawasaki T-4 aircraft.

== History ==
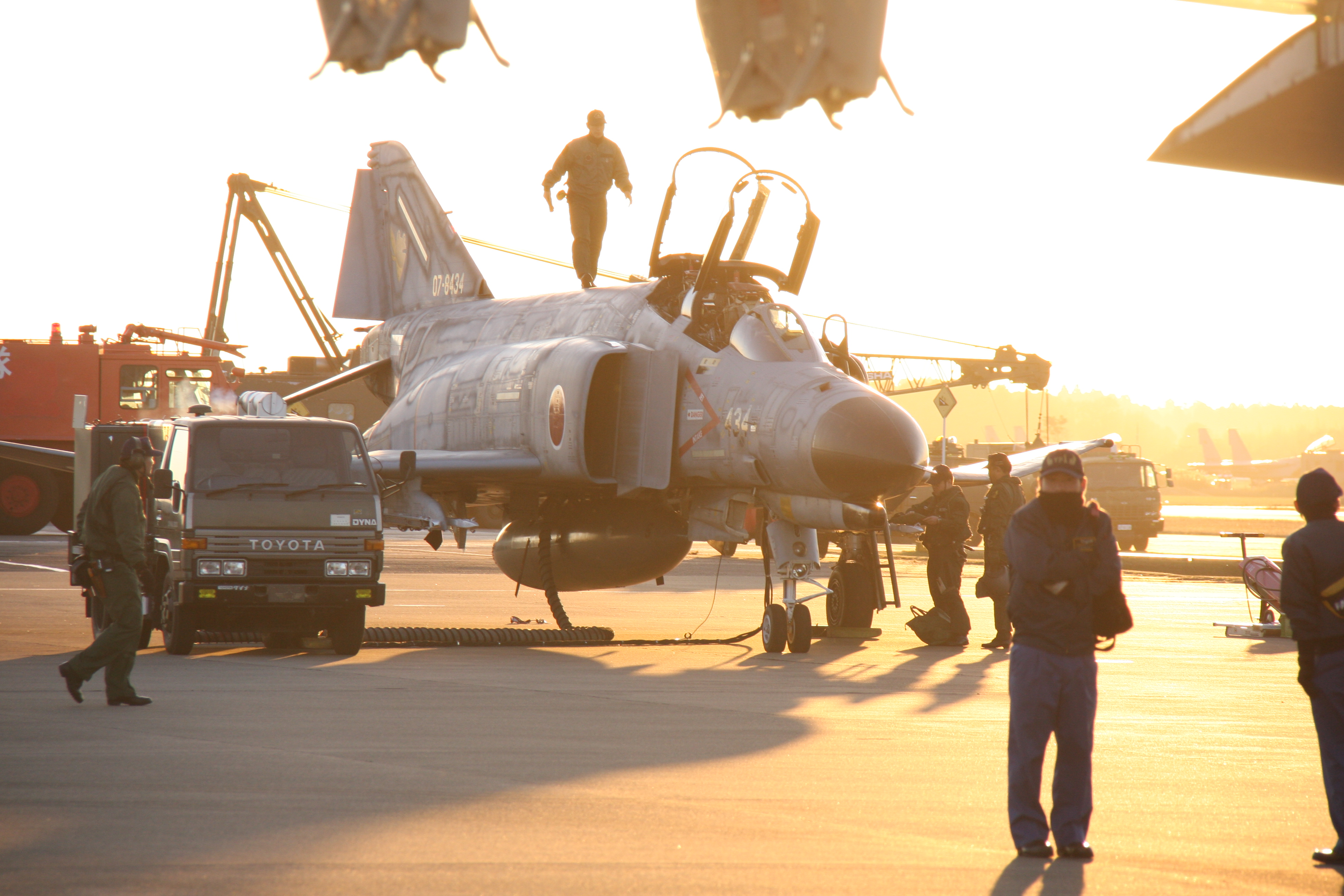
F-4EJ Kai 07-8434 at Nyutabaru Air Base, 2009.

Prior to the 301st being formed as a full-fledged unit, it originally came into being as the Provisional F-4EJ squadron with only two aircraft in service on August 1, 1972. It was the first unit of the JASDF to fly the F-4. On February 25, the first operational conversation course for F-4EJ pilots was started.

The 301st Tactical Fighter Squadron was founded at Hyakuri Air Base on October 16, 1973, as a Mitsubishi Heavy Industries F-4EJ Phantom II squadron. It was also equipped with Kawasaki-built Lockheed T-33A trainer/liaison aircraft. The squadron was tasked with being the operational conversion unit for the F-4EJ.

On March 2, 1985, it moved to Nyutabaru Air Base in Miyazaki prefecture in Kyushu, swapping bases with the 204th Tactical Fighter Squadron which was flying the F-104J Starfighter but was due to convert to the F-15J and F-15DJ Eagle at Hyakuri.

In April 1991, the squadron updated from F-4EJ to F-4EJ Kai aircraft.

On October 31, 2016, as part of a JASDF reorganization it switched bases with the F-15J equipped 305th Tactical Fighter Squadron and returned to Hyakuri Air Base. By 2016, the 301st TFS was tasked primarily with an air-to-ground mission, with its secondary role being air-to-air.

One of the aircraft operated by the squadron (17-8440) was the last of the 5,195 F-4 Phantoms to be produced. It was manufactured by Mitsubishi Heavy Industries on May 21, 1981. "The Final Phantom" originally served with the 306th Tactical Fighter Squadron. In early December 2020, 17-8440 was withdrawn from use and flown to the Air Park Museum at Hamamatsu Air Base for preservation.

On November 20, 2020, it was announced the 301st TFS had retired its Phantoms. However, they continued to operate the Phantom up until December 10, finally being decommissioned on December 14. On December 15, 2020, the 301st TFS completed relocation to Misawa Air Base and became operational with the Mitsubishi Heavy Industries F-35A Lightning II replacing their F-4EJs. By March 2021, four F-35As (09-8719, 09-8721, 69-8701 and 89-8711) had been delivered to the 301st TFS.

== Tail marking ==
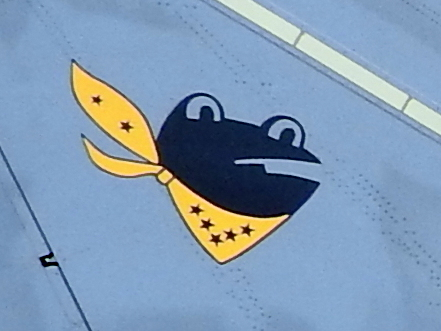
Tail marking on an F-4EJ, 2016.

The squadron emblem of the 301st squadron is a frog wearing a scarf. The word for "frog" in Japanese is kaeru, the same sound (but different characters) as the word for "come home" (safely). The frog is based on the Japanese common toad, which is found by Mount Tsukuba nearby Hyakuri airbase where the squadron was formed. The frog wears a scarf adorned with stars. The number of stars represent the air wing it belongs to, and as it currently belongs to the 3rd Air Wing it has three stars. When it belonged to the 5th Air Wing at Nyutabaru in Miyazaki Prefecture from 1985 to 2016 it had five.

== Aircraft operated ==
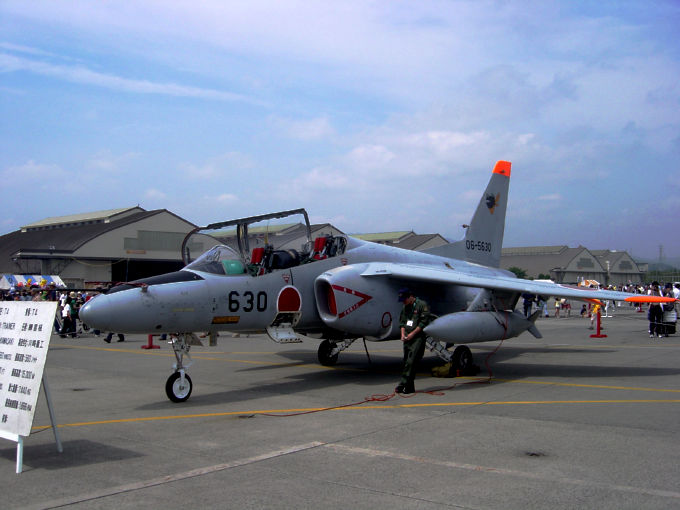
301st TFS Kawasaki T-4 06-5630 at MCAS Iwakuni, 2005.

=== Fighter aircraft ===
- Mitsubishi Heavy Industries F-4EJ Phantom II (1973–1990)
- Mitsubishi Heavy Industries F-4EJ Kai Phantom II (1991–2020)
- Mitsubishi Heavy Industries F-35A Lightning II (2020–present)

=== Liaison aircraft ===
- Kawasaki T-33A (1973–1993)
- Kawasaki T-4 (1991–present)

== In popular culture ==
The squadron appeared operating navalized aircraft in the Nuclear Aircraft Carrier Shinano 1990s novels by Shou Narumi (Mitsui Shinpei).

The squadron was also depicted in the 2012 Eureka Seven: AO manga. As the story took place in 2025, the squadron was depicted as having upgraded from F-4 to F-15J aircraft.

== See also ==
- Fighter units of the Japan Air Self-Defense Force
