= 1st Squadron (JASDF) =

- 第1飛行隊
- Active: Jan. 10, 1956 – March 31, 1979
- Country: Japan
- Branch: Japan Air Self-Defense Force
- Part of: Central Air Defense Force, 1st Air Wing
- Garrison/HQ: Hamamatsu Air Base

Aircraft flown
- Fighter: North American F-86F Sabre

The 1st Squadron (第1飛行隊 (dai-ichi-hikoutai)) was a squadron of the 1st Air Wing of the Japan Air Self-Defense Force based at Hamamatsu Air Base, in Shizuoka Prefecture, Japan. It was equipped with North American F-86F Sabre aircraft.

== History ==
On January 10, 1956 the squadron was formed at Hamamatsu Air Base in Shizuoka Prefecture. It was the first fighter squadron formed by Japan since the Imperial Japanese Army Air Service and the Imperial Japanese Navy Air Service were dissolved at the end of World War II. It was responsible for training pilots.

It was disbanded on March 31, 1979. At that time the type of aircraft operated by a Japanese fighter squadron was linked to the type of aircraft operated. Squadrons 1–11 were F-86F squadrons.

== Aircraft operated ==
=== Fighter aircraft ===
- North American F-86F Sabre（1956–1979）

== See also ==
- Fighter units of the Japan Air Self-Defense Force
