= 7th Air Wing (JASDF) =

- 第7航空団
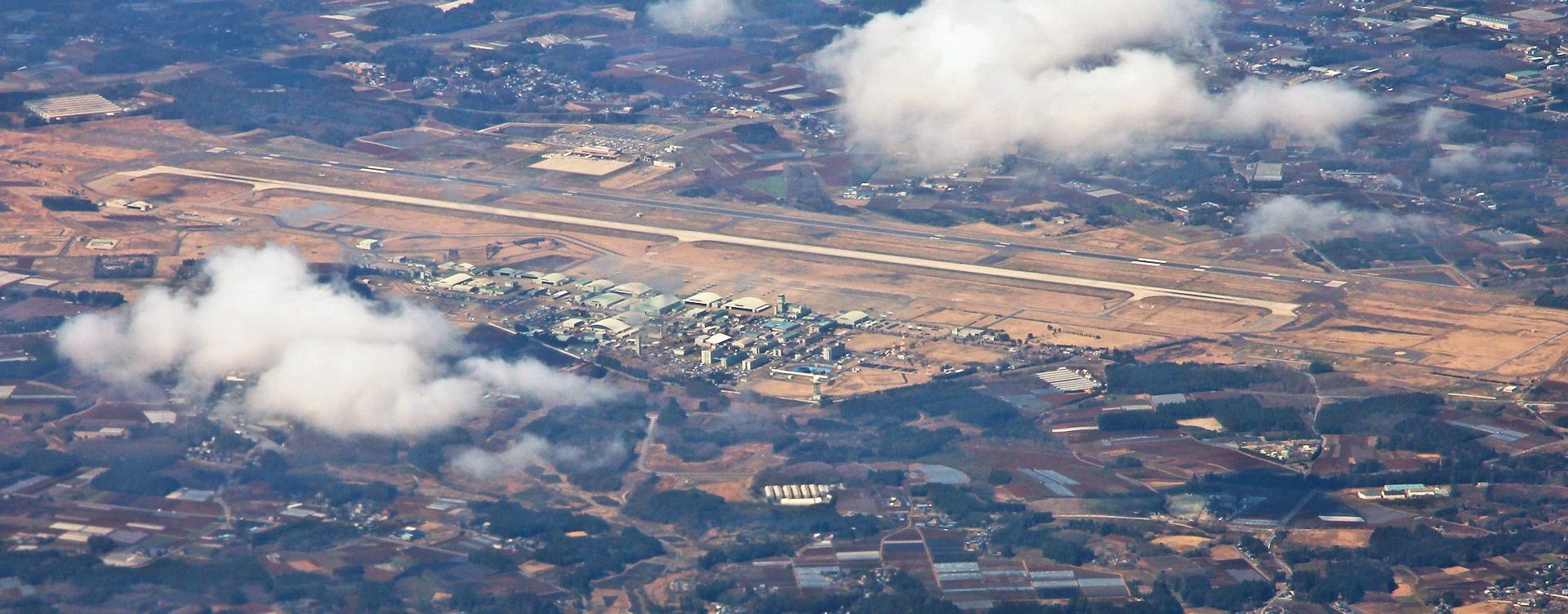
- Hyakuri Air Base
- Active: October 1, 1974
- Country: Japan
- Branch: Japan Air Self-Defense Force
- Part of: 中部航空方面隊
- Garrison/HQ: Hyakuri Air Base

Aircraft flown
- Fighter: Mitsubishi F-2
- Trainer: Kawasaki T-4

The 7th Air Wing (第7航空団 (dai-nana-koukudan)) is a wing of the Japan Air Self-Defense Force. It comes under the authority of the Central Air Defense Force. It is based at Hyakuri Air Base in Ibaraki Prefecture.

As of 2019 it has one squadron, equipped with Mitsubishi F-2 and Kawasaki T-4 aircraft:

- 3rd Tactical Fighter Squadron

== Gallery ==
Aircraft

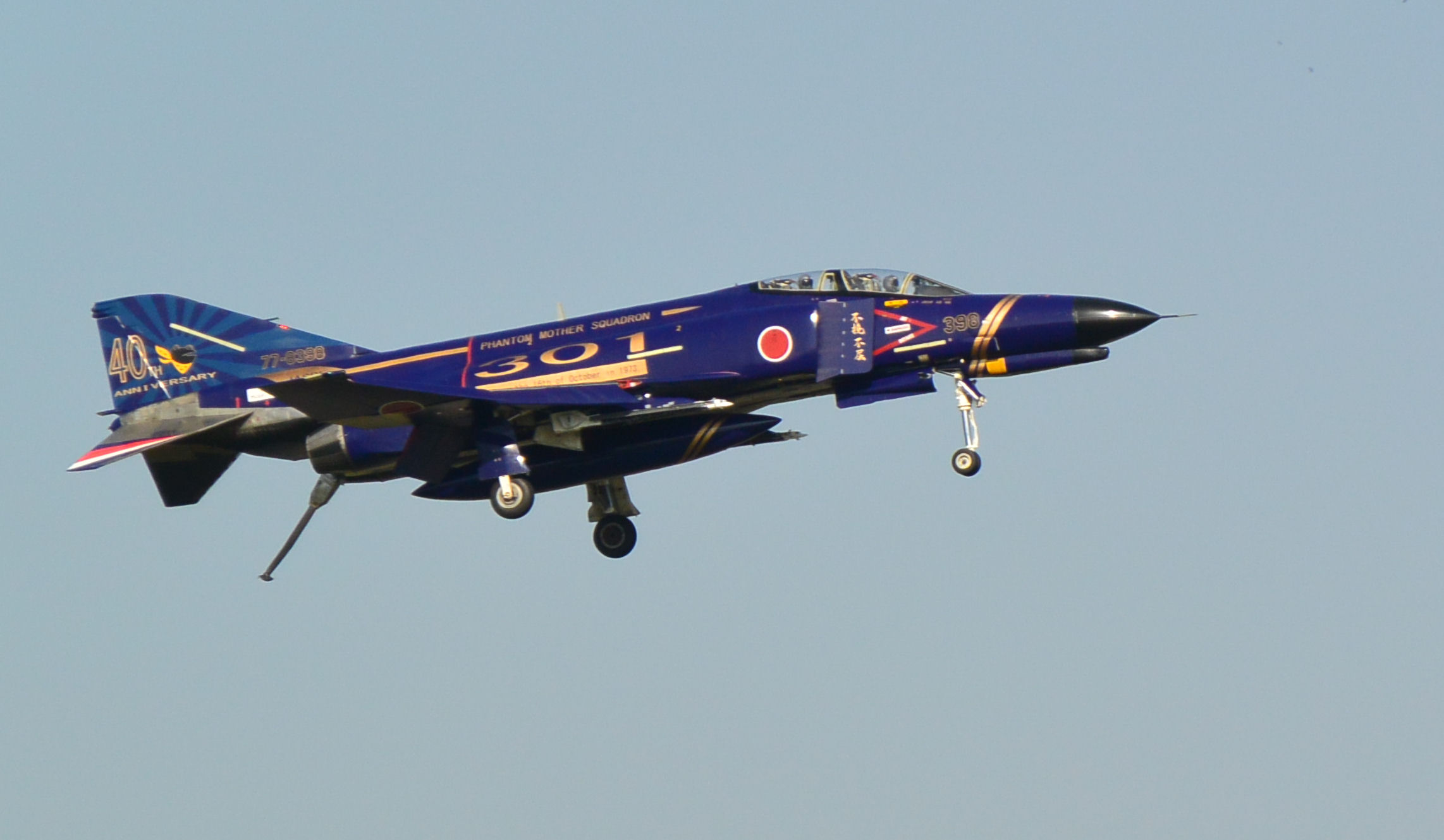
301 TFS F-4EJ Kai painted in celebration of the Wing's 40th anniversary (2013)

== See also ==
- Fighter units of the Japan Air Self-Defense Force
