= Chitose Air Base =

Chitose Air Base 千歳基地
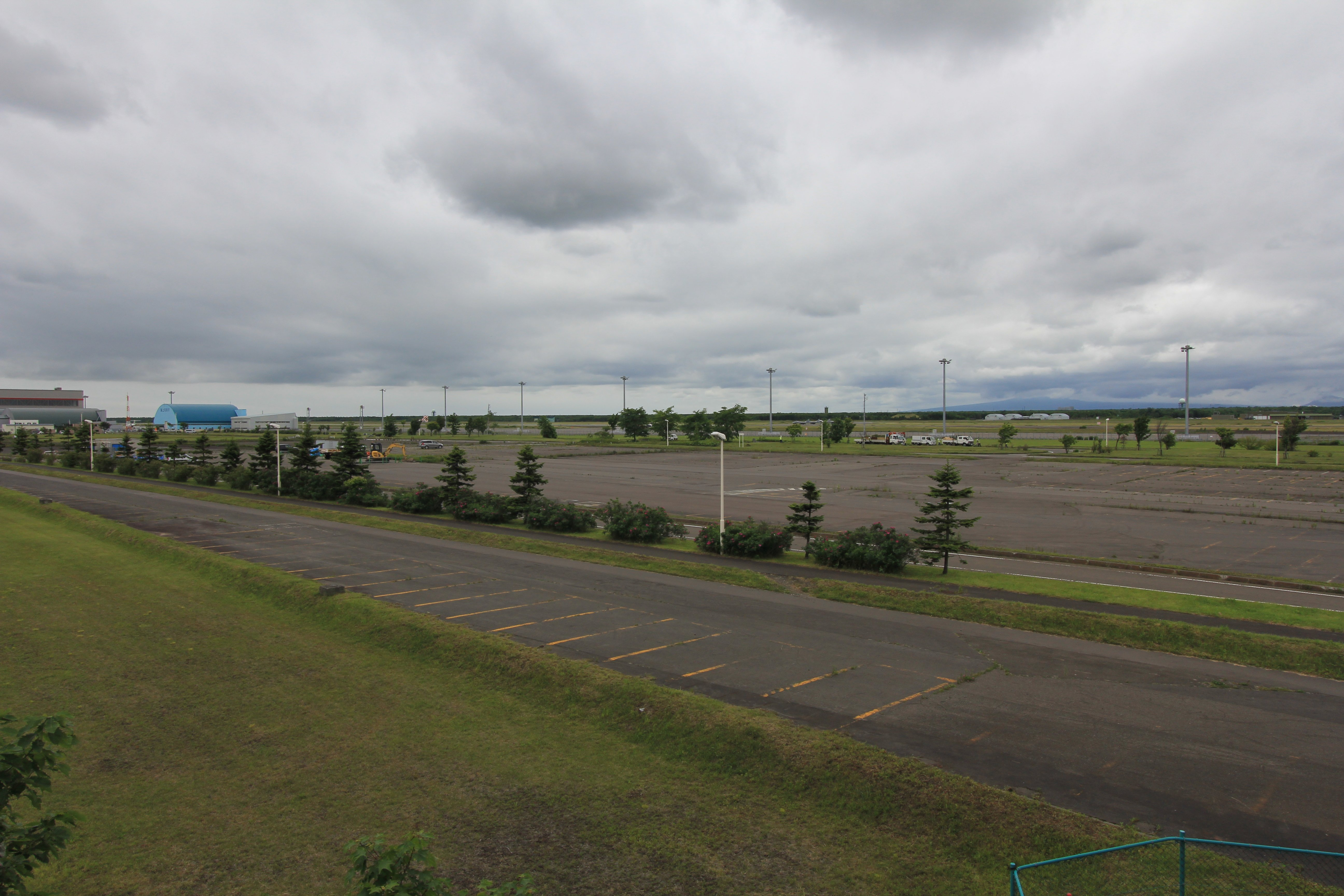
- IATA: none; ICAO: RJCJ

Summary
- Airport type: Military
- Operator: Japan Air Self-Defense Force
- Location: Chitose, Hokkaidō, Japan
- Elevation AMSL: 89 ft (27 m)
- Coordinates: 42°47′40″N 141°39′59″E

Map
- Location in Japan RJCJ (Japan)

Runways
| Direction | Length | | Surface |
| Direction | m | ft | Surface |
|---|---|---|---|
| 18L/36R | 4,000 | 13,123 | Concrete |
| 18R/36L | 2,700 | 8,858 | Asphalt concrete |
- Source: Japanese AIP at AIS Japan

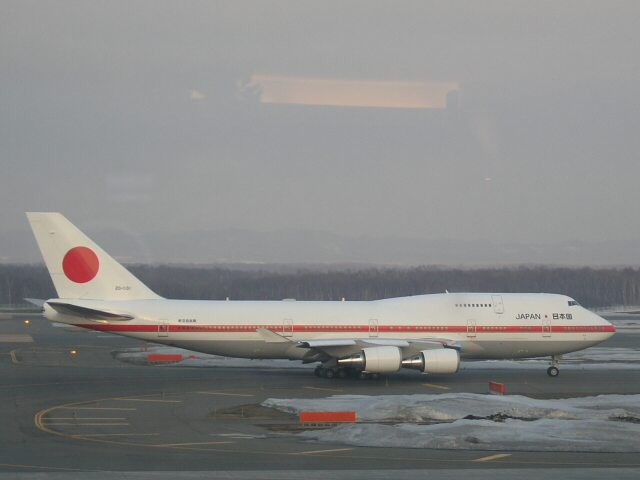
Boeing 747-400 of the Japanese Air Force One Corps at Chitose Air Base

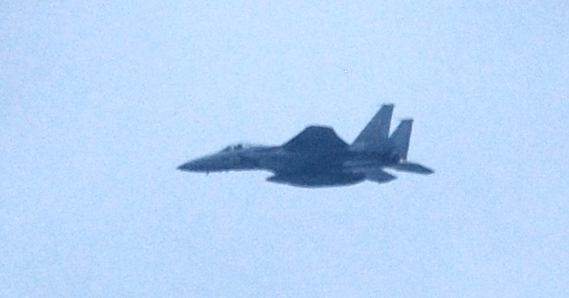
A Chitose Air Base F-15J in mid flight

Chitose Air Base (千歳基地, Chitose Kichi) (ICAO: RJCJ), is a Japan Air Self-Defense Force base located in Chitose, Hokkaidō, adjacent to New Chitose Airport. It is the JASDF's primary base in northern Japan and tasked with monitoring Japan's maritime borders with Russia. It was also Hokkaidō's primary civilian airport until the opening of New Chitose Airport in 1988. Together, these two jointly operated and connected airports create one of the largest regional airports in Japan.

== History ==
=== US military service ===
Chitose's first flight came in 1926, when the Otaru Shimbun newspaper sponsored the "Hokkai One" (Hokkai-ichigō) flight, originating at a 10-hectare air field donated by the villagers of Chitose. In 1939, the Imperial Japanese Navy took over the field.

After Japan's surrender in 1945, ending World War II, the United States Armed Forces took over the base, being primarily under the control of the United States Army Air Forces, and later the United States Air Force Fifth Air Force. Major USAF occupation units assigned to Chitose Air Base were:

- 3rd Air Commando Group (309th Bombardment Wing), October 1945-March 1946
- 49th Fighter Group (later Wing), February 1946-April 1948

The base was used largely as a maintenance and logistics facility in the late 1940s prior to the Korean War, under the operational control of the 314th Air Division, Johnson Air Base. Chitose was operated as a sub-base to Johnson AB. As a result of the Korean War, the 6163d Air Base Wing was activated on 1 January 1951. The airfield was used primarily as an emergency landing field for aircraft returning from combat missions over Korea, and as a maintenance and repair depot by Technical Service Command.

During the Allied occupation, in 1951, Chitose received its first scheduled civilian flights to Tokyo, operated by Japan Airlines.

After the 1953 Korean Armistice, the USAF moved its F-86 Sabre-equipped 4th Fighter Group (later Wing) from Kimpo AB (K-14), South Korea in September 1954. The only American combat unit assigned to Chitose, the squadron provided air defense of Hokkaidō for several years, being inactivated in place on 1 July 1957 due to budget restrictions.

With the inactivation of the 4th Fighter Wing, Chitose was phased down for return to Japanese control. The 6029th Support Group was activated and continued support for the units assigned to the base. It was inactivated along with the other United States military units at the base on 31 December 1957, returning the facility over to Japanese control. The US maintained a communications facility at the base until December 1970, and formally ended operations at Chitose on June 30, 1975.

=== Civilian service ===
The passenger terminal at Chitose Airport opened in 1963. Chitose quickly overtook Okadama Airport, which was too small to serve jet aircraft, as the main airport serving the Sapporo metropolitan area.

Immigration facilities were constructed in 1969, prior to the opening of the 1972 Winter Olympics in Sapporo. The only scheduled international service at Chitose was a Japan Air System flight to Honolulu with a stop at Tokyo Narita, which operated from 1981 to 1987.

All civilian passenger service was transferred to New Chitose Airport in 1988.

== JSDF units based at Chitose ==
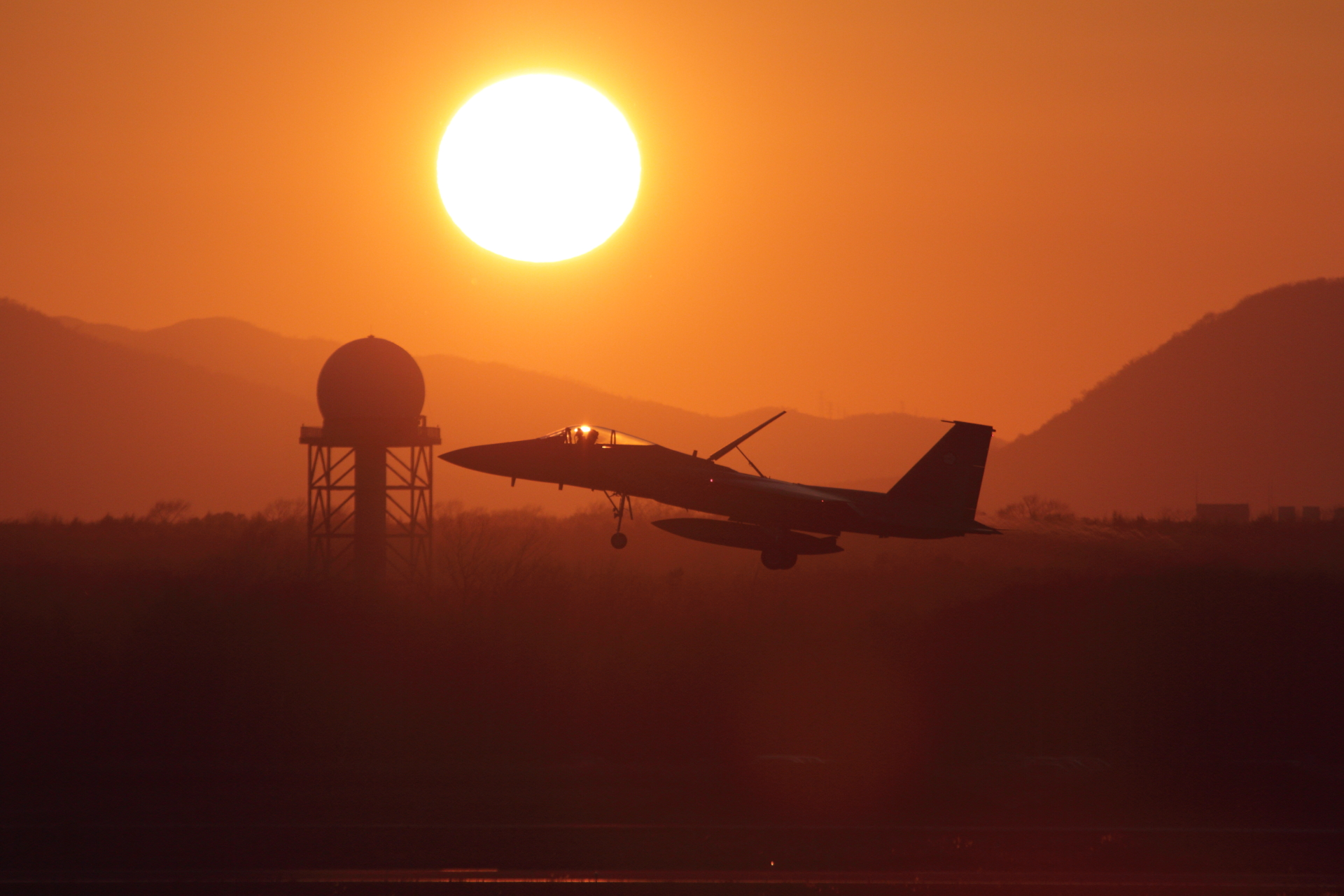
F-15J landing at Chitose (2010)

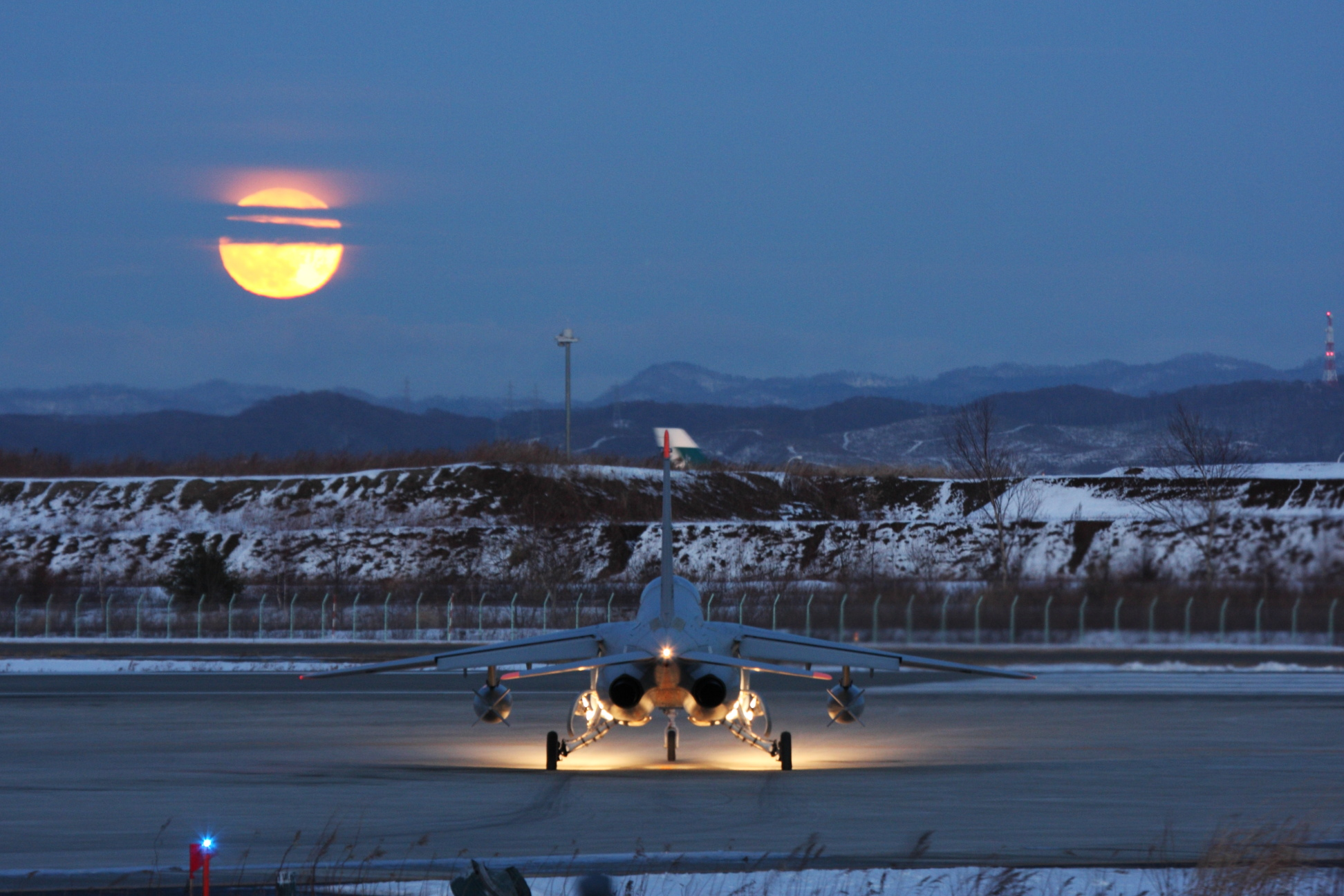
Kawasaki T-4 at Chitose (2013)

=== Northern Air Defense Force ===
- 2nd Air Wing

201st Tactical Fighter Squadron (F-15J, Kawasaki T-4)
203rd Tactical Fighter Squadron (F-15J, Kawasaki T-4)

- 3rd Air Defence Missile Group (Patriot missiles)

9th Fire Unit
10th Fire Unit

- 8th Mobile Aircraft Control and Warning Squadron

=== Air Support Command ===
- Special Air Transport Corps (Boeing 777-300ERs used by the Japanese government)
- Chitose Air Rescue Wing (Mitsubishi UH-60J, BA Series 800 U-125A)

== Accidents and incidents ==
- August 19, 1982: A Japan Airlines Boeing 747-146SR suffered a runway strike of the No. 4 engine while landing in Chitose. The aircraft, JA8119 would go on to crash three years later in what would become the worst crash of a single aircraft in aviation history.

== In media ==
Chitose Air Base was used as the main setting of the 1990 film Best Guy and the 1994 anime OVA series 801 T.T.S. Airbats.
