= Air Rescue Wing (JASDF) =

- 航空救難団
- Insignia of the Air Rescue Wing
- Active: July 15, 1961
- Country: Japan
- Branch: Japan Air Self-Defense Force
- Type: Wing
- Role: Search and rescue
- Garrison/HQ: Iruma Air Base
- Motto: That others may live

Aircraft flown
- CH-47J, UH-60J, U-125A

The Air Rescue Wing (航空救難団, koukuukyuunandan) is a wing of the Japan Air Self-Defense Force. Responsible for airborne search and rescue, it is headquartered at Iruma Air Base in Saitama Prefecture and controls squadrons and detachments across Japan. The helicopter airlift squadrons were previously under the authority of Air Support Command. It is equipped with CH-47J, UH-60J and U-125A aircraft.

== History ==
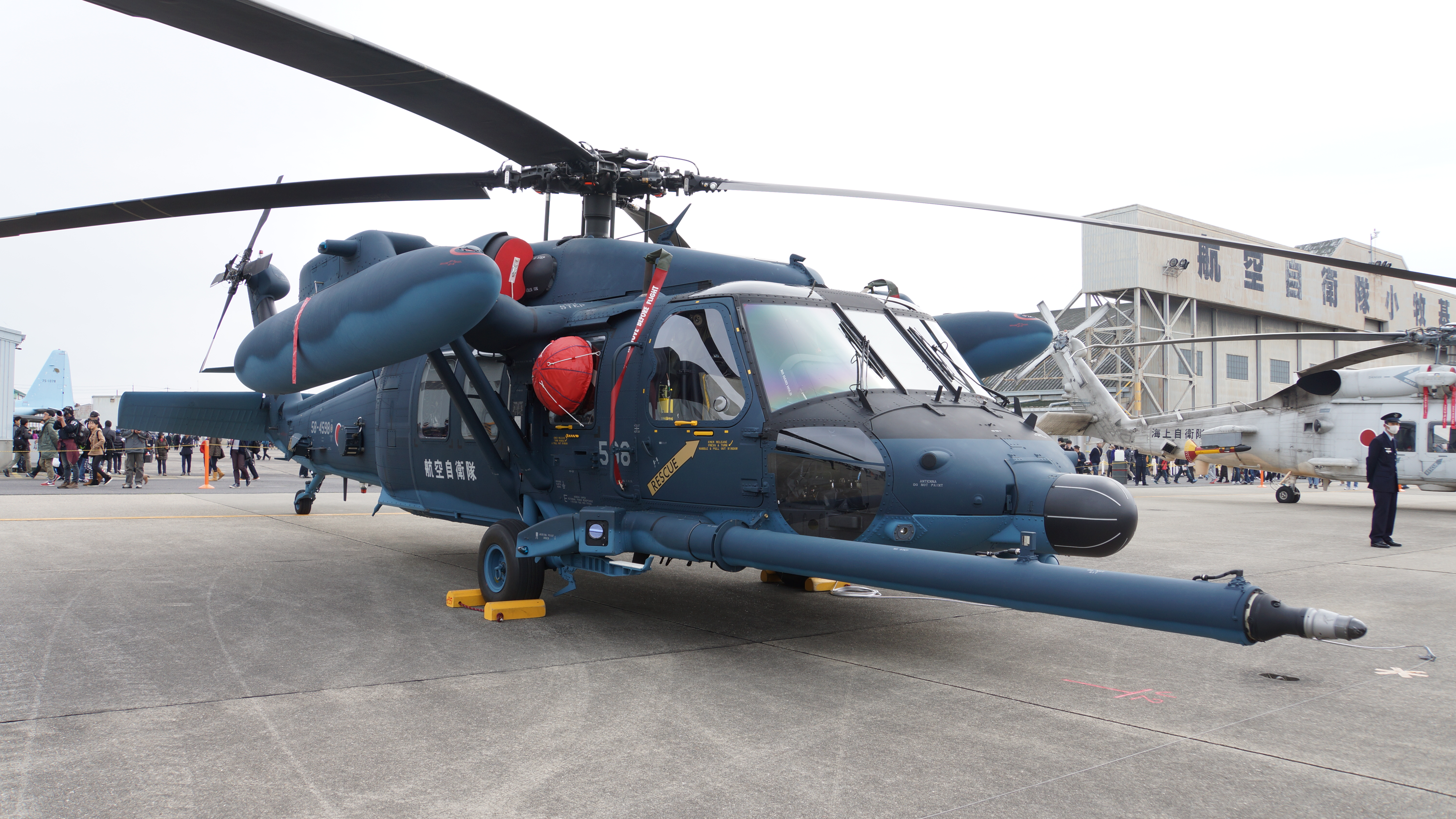
UH-60J with refueling probe fitted (2016)

From 2009 the Air Rescue Wing began training in air-to-air refueling with US forces, and from 2010 two of the JASDF's 401st Tactical Airlift Squadron C-130H aircraft were given air-to-air refueling equipment, allowing them to refuel UH-60J helicopters. In June 2017 UH-60JA aircraft of the wing practiced night air-to-air refueling with US forces.

On May 28, 2013 the Air Rescue Wing Naha Detachment rescued the pilot of an F-15C of the US Air Force's 44th Fighter Squadron that had crashed into the ocean off Okinawa.

On October 17, 2017 a JASDF UH-60J of the Hamamatsu Detachment of the Air Rescue Wing crashed into the sea off Shizuoka Prefecture while conducting night rescue drills. Wreckage was found but the four crew members were not located.

On June 11, 2018 the Naha Detachment rescued the pilot of another US F-15C of the 44th Fighter Squadron that had ejected over the sea off Okinawa.

== Units ==
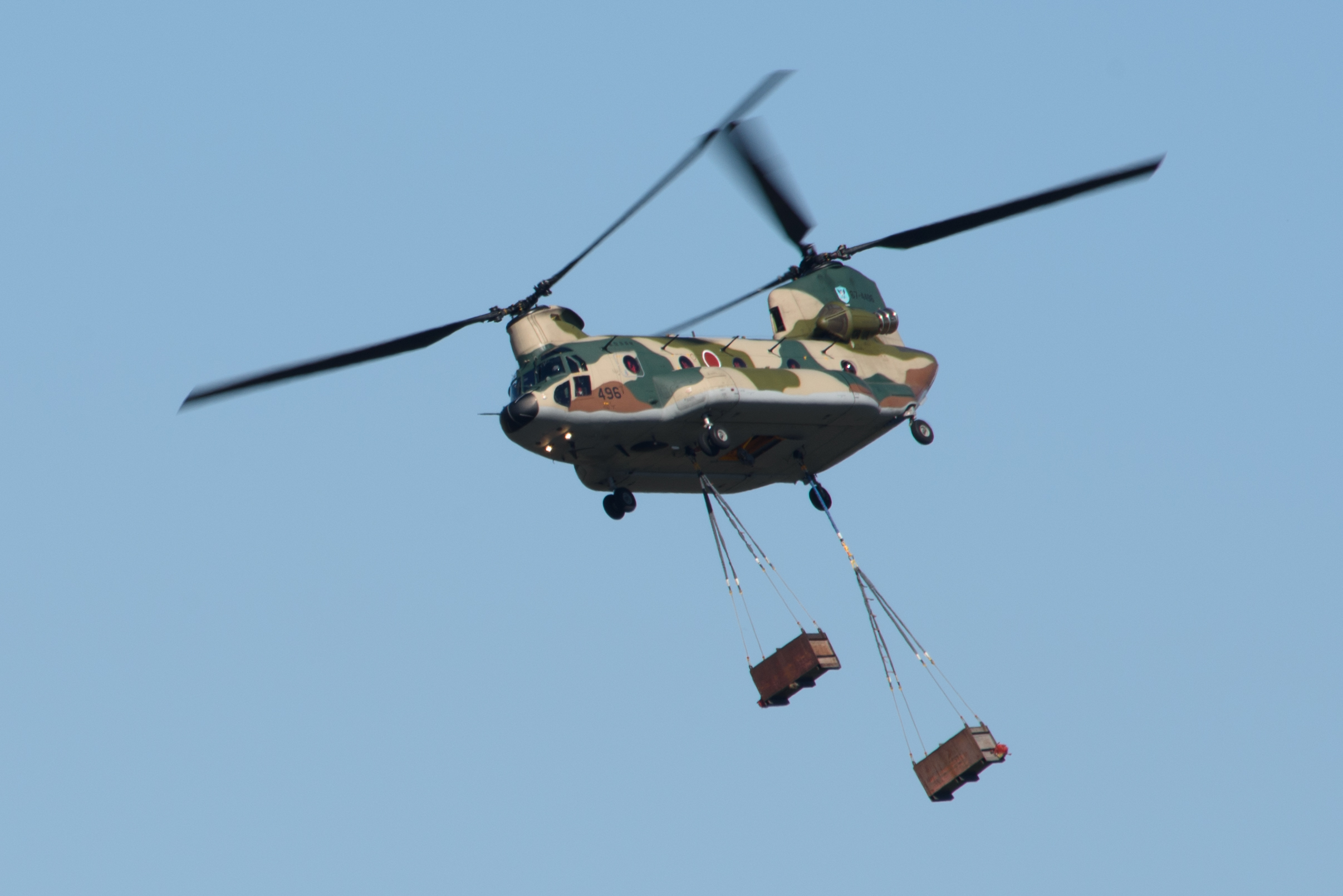
Iruma Helicopter Airlift Squadron CH-47J (2015)

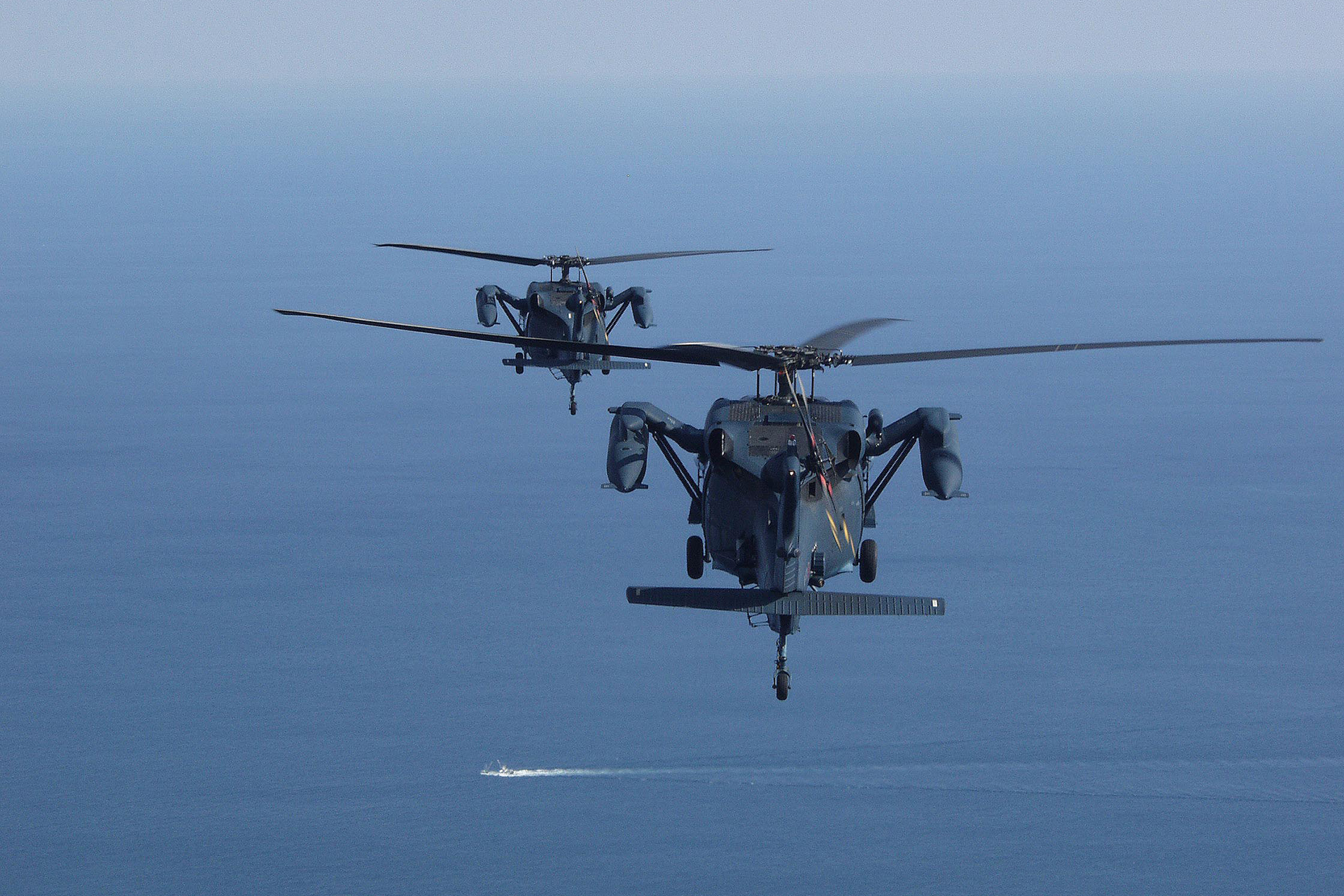
Air Rescue Wing UH-60Js in flight

- Air Rescue Squadron (UH-60J, U-125A)
  - Air Rescue Wing Chitose Detachment (Chitose Air Base)
  - Air Rescue Wing Matsushima Detachment (Matsushima Air Base)
  - Air Rescue Wing Ashiya Detachment (Ashiya Air Base)
  - Air Rescue Wing Akita Detachment (Akita Airport)
  - Air Rescue Wing Hyakuri Detachment (Hyakuri Air Base)
  - Air Rescue Wing Nyutabaru Detachment (Nyutabaru Air Base)
  - Air Rescue Wing Niigata Detachment (Niigata Airport)
  - Air Rescue Wing Hamamatsu Detachment (Hamamatsu Air Base)
  - Air Rescue Wing Naha Detachment (Naha Air Base)
  - Air Rescue Wing Komatsu Detachment (Komatsu Air Base)
  - Air Rescue Wing Komaki Detachment (Training squadron) (Komaki Air Base)
- Squadrons (CH-47J)
  - Iruma Helicopter Airlift Squadron (Iruma Air Base)
  - Kasuga Helicopter Airlift Squadron (Kasuga Air Base)
  - Misawa Helicopter Airlift Squadron (Misawa Air Base)
  - Naha Helicopter Airlift Squadron (Naha Air Base)

== Aircraft operated ==
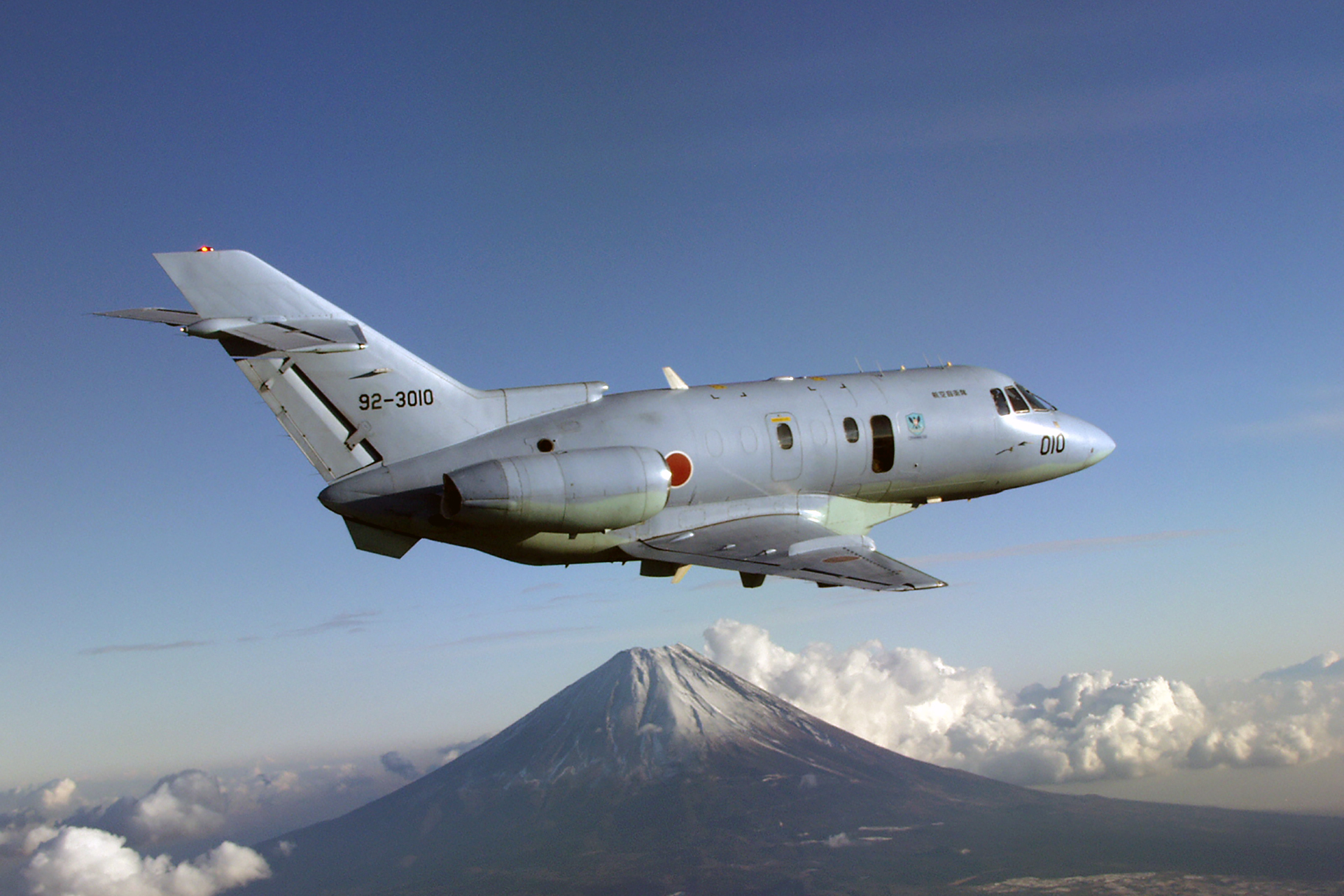
Air Rescue Wing U-125A

- CH-47J
- UH-60J
- U-125A
