= Air Rescue Wing Chitose Detachment (JASDF) =

- 千歳救難隊
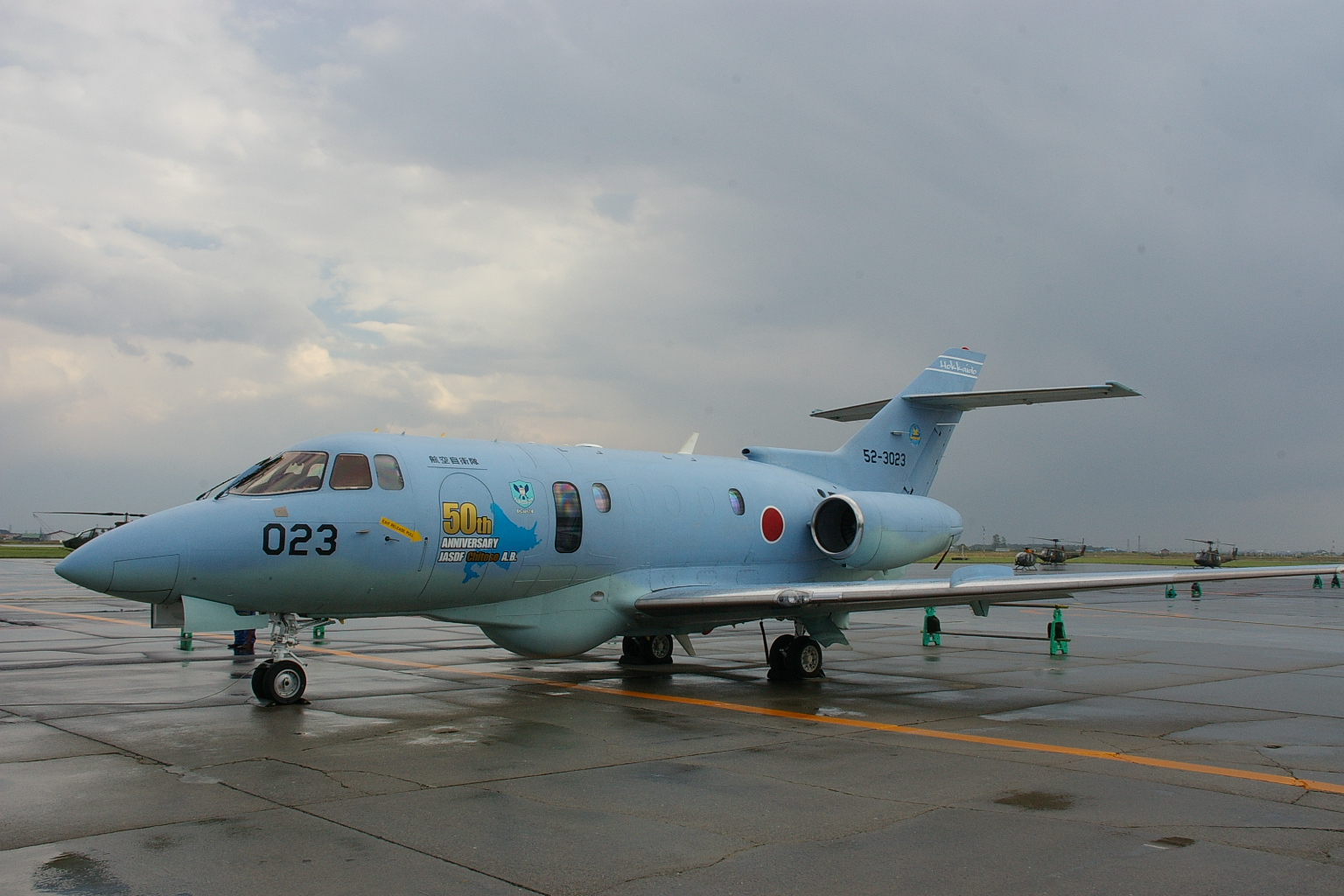
- Chitose Detachment U-125A (2007)
- Country: Japan
- Branch: Japan Air Self-Defense Force
- Part of: Air Rescue Wing
- Garrison/HQ: Chitose Air Base
- Motto(s): That others may live

Aircraft flown
- UH-60J, U-125A

The Air Rescue Wing Chitose Detachment (千歳救難隊 (chitose-kyūnan-tai)) is a unit of the Air Rescue Wing of the Japan Air Self-Defense Force. It is also known as the Chitose Air Rescue Squadron. Responsible for airborne search and rescue, it is based at Chitose Air Base in Hokkaido Prefecture. It is equipped with UH-60J and U-125A aircraft.

== Tail markings ==
Detachment UH-60J aircraft do not have special markings. JASDF aircraft usually have unit markings on their tail, but U-125A aircraft of the Air Rescue Wing have a marking on their fuselage, usually with a sticker below showing which base they are assigned to.

== Aircraft operated ==
- UH-60J
- U-125A
