= Western Aviation =

Aircraft Charter Company based in Dubai

Western Aviation is Aircraft Charter Company based in Dubai. It provides charter flights for corporates and leisure travelers between the Middle East, Europe, Asia, Africa, Russia, CIS Countries, and other famous destinations like Maldives, Mauritius and Seychelles.

== History ==
Western Aviation was started in the year 2005. Western Aviation is part of Western Group of Companies whose parent company is Dubai based multinational business conglomerate ETA Ascon Star Group of companies, which has around 150 associated offices and branches in 22 countries, employing over 72,000 people with an annual turnover of around 5 Billion US Dollars.

== Private jet aircraft ==
Western Aviation provides the following Private Jet Aircraft/Helicopters Sales and Leasing, Charter Brokerage and Appraisals on a Global basis.

=== Light jets ===
- Citation Jet II, Bravo
- Citation Jet III, VII
- Beechcraft Premiet 1A

=== Midsized jets ===
- Hawker 900XP
- Hawker 850XP
- Hawker 800XP
- Cessna Citation Sovereign
- Bombardier LearJet 60XR

=== Heavy jets ===
- Bombardier Challenger 604
- Bombardier Challenger 601
- Bombardier Global Express
- Embraer Legacy 600
- Gulfstream GIII
- Gulfstream G450
- Gulfstream GV
