= Span Air (India) =

IATA	ICAO	Call sign
—	—	—
- Founded: 29 November 1985
- Commenced operations: 1995
- AOC #: #06/1995
- Operating bases: Indira Gandhi International Airport (Delhi)
- Fleet size: 4
- Key people: Nakul Nath (Director)
- Website: http://spanair.in/index.html

Span Air is an Indian charter airline based in New Delhi.

== History ==
The airline started operations in 1995 and currently operates to domestic destinations within the country. In 2014 the airline's Hawker 900XP aircraft was grounded due to safety violations concerning crew training. In the same year the company was one of the recipients of the American Helicopter Society's Captain William J. Kossler Award for its part in rescue and humanitarian operations during the 2013 flooding in Uttarakhand.

== Fleet ==
Span Air operates the following aircraft as of July 2018:

Span Air (India) fleet
Aircraft	In fleet	Passengers	Notes
Hawker 800	1	9	
Bell 429 GlobalRanger	1	6	
Bell 407 GX	1	6	
Beechcraft Super King Air 200	1	7	
