= Air Rescue Wing Hamamatsu Detachment (JASDF) =

- 浜松救難隊
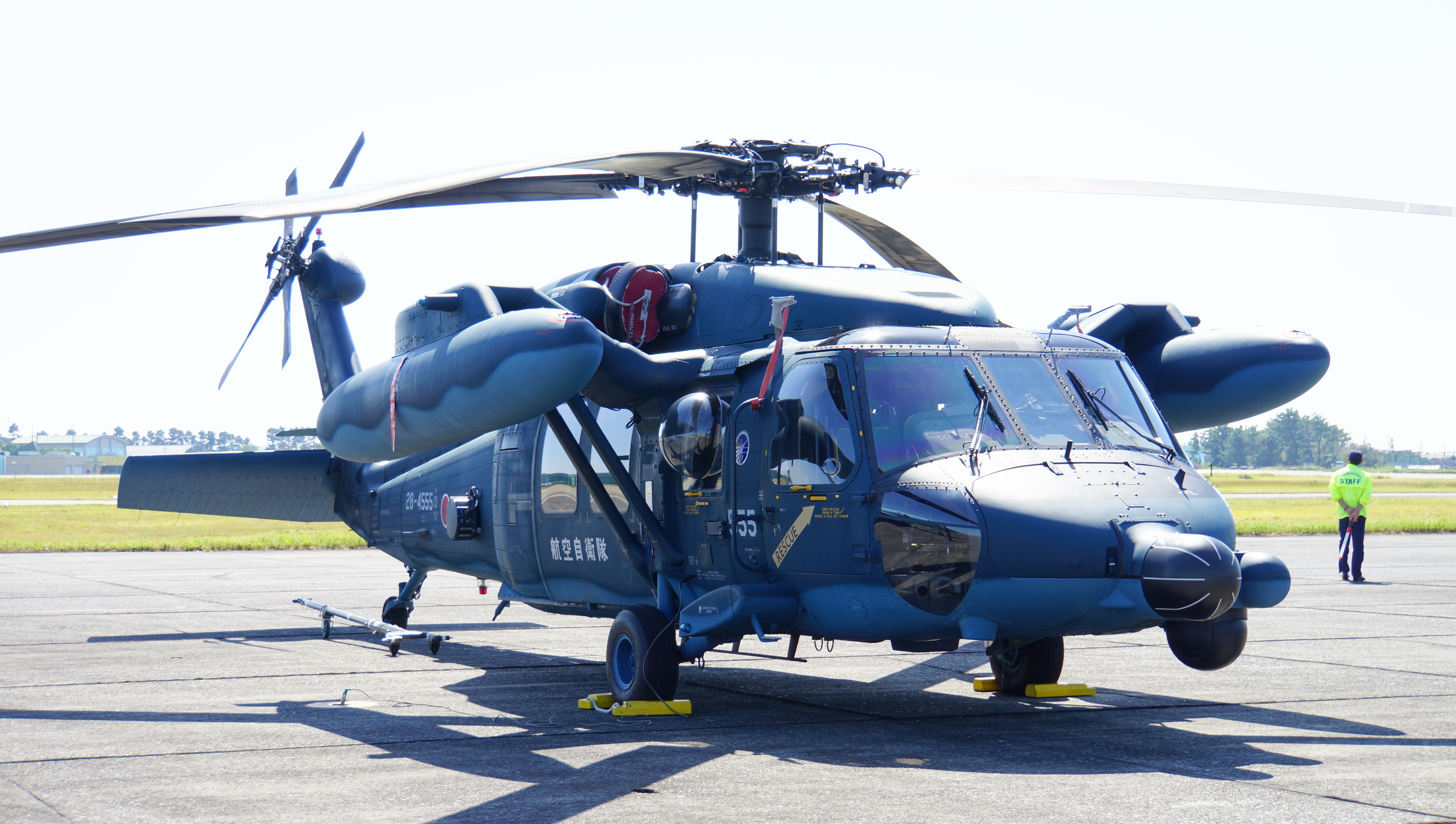
- Detachment UH-60J
- Country: Japan
- Branch: Japan Air Self-Defense Force
- Part of: Air Rescue Wing
- Garrison/HQ: Hamamatsu Air Base
- Motto(s): That others may live

Aircraft flown
- UH-60J, U-125A

The Air Rescue Wing Hamamatsu Detachment (浜松救難隊 (hamamatsu-kyūnan-tai)) is a unit of the Air Rescue Wing of the Japan Air Self-Defense Force. It is also known as the Hamamatsu Air Rescue Squadron. Responsible for airborne search and rescue, it is based at Hamamatsu Air Base in Shizuoka Prefecture. It is equipped with UH-60J and U-125A aircraft.

== History ==
On October 17, 2017 UH-60J 58-4596 of the detachment crashed into the sea off Shizuoka Prefecture while conducting night rescue drills. Some wreckage was found but the four crew members were not located. Major searches continued with SDF assets and other parts were recovered. A private salvage company started work from November 2 and located part of the fuselage. In November parts of the aircraft were recovered including the Flight Data Recorder (black box) from a location approximately 31 kilometers south of Hamamatsu Air Base. On November 29 the body of one of the crew members was discovered in the wreckage.

== Tail markings ==
Detachment UH-60J aircraft do not have special markings. JASDF aircraft usually have unit markings on their tail, but U-125A aircraft of the Air Rescue Wing have a marking on their fuselage, usually with a sticker below showing which base they are assigned to.

== Aircraft operated ==
- UH-60J
- U-125A
