= Air Rescue Wing Komatsu Detachment (JASDF) =

- 小松救難隊
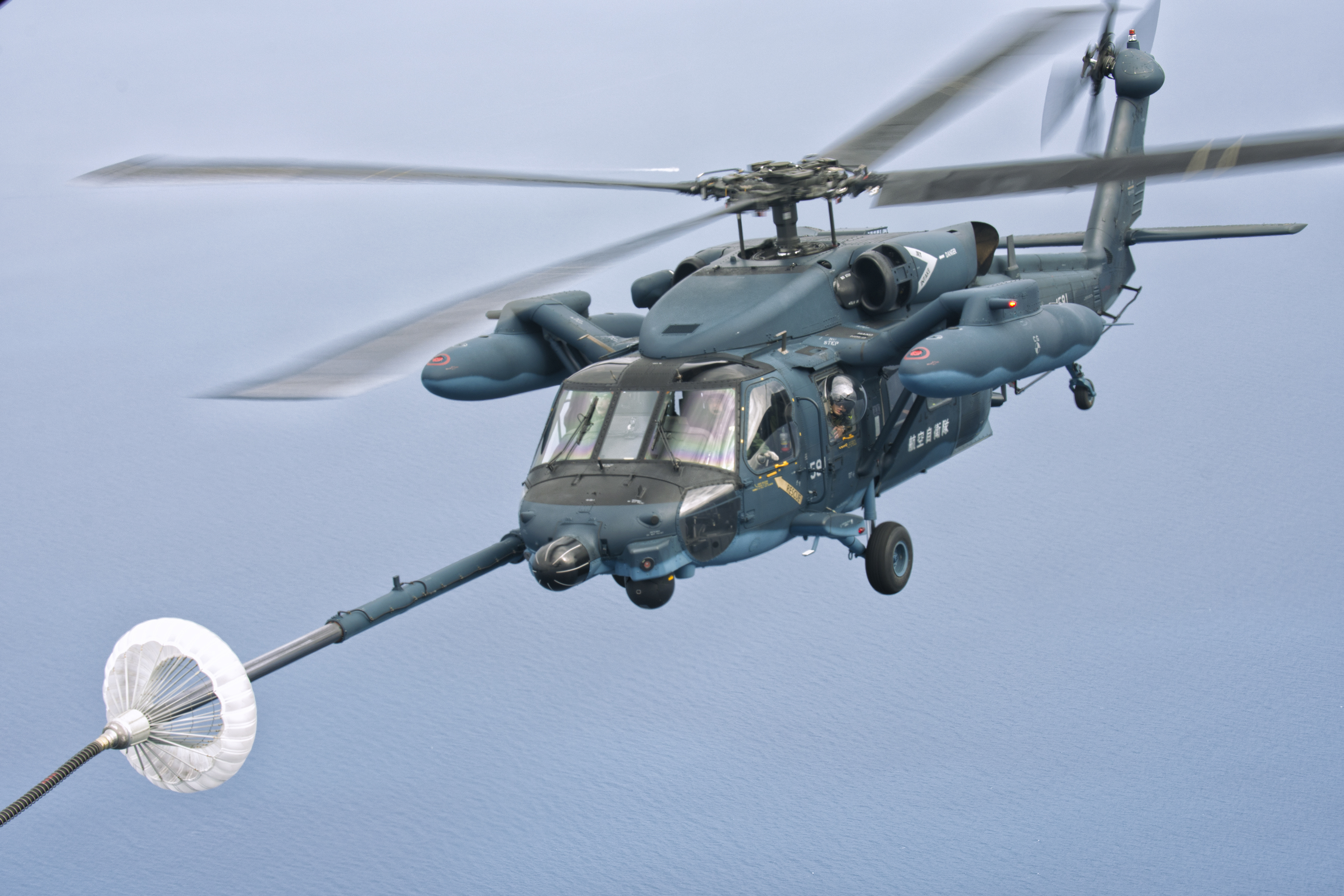
- Detachment UH-60J (2014)
- Country: Japan
- Branch: Japan Air Self-Defense Force
- Part of: Air Rescue Wing
- Garrison/HQ: Komatsu Air Base
- Motto(s): That others may live

Aircraft flown
- UH-60J, U-125A

The Air Rescue Wing Komatsu Detachment (小松救難隊 (komatsu-kyūnan-tai)) is a unit of the Air Rescue Wing of the Japan Air Self-Defense Force. It is also known as the Komatsu Air Rescue Squadron. Responsible for airborne search and rescue, it is based at Komatsu Air Base in Ishikawa Prefecture. It is equipped with UH-60J and U-125A aircraft.

== Tail markings ==
Detachment UH-60J aircraft do not have special markings. JASDF aircraft usually have unit markings on their tail, but U-125A aircraft of the Air Rescue Wing have a marking on their fuselage, usually with a sticker below showing which base they are assigned to.

== Aircraft operated ==
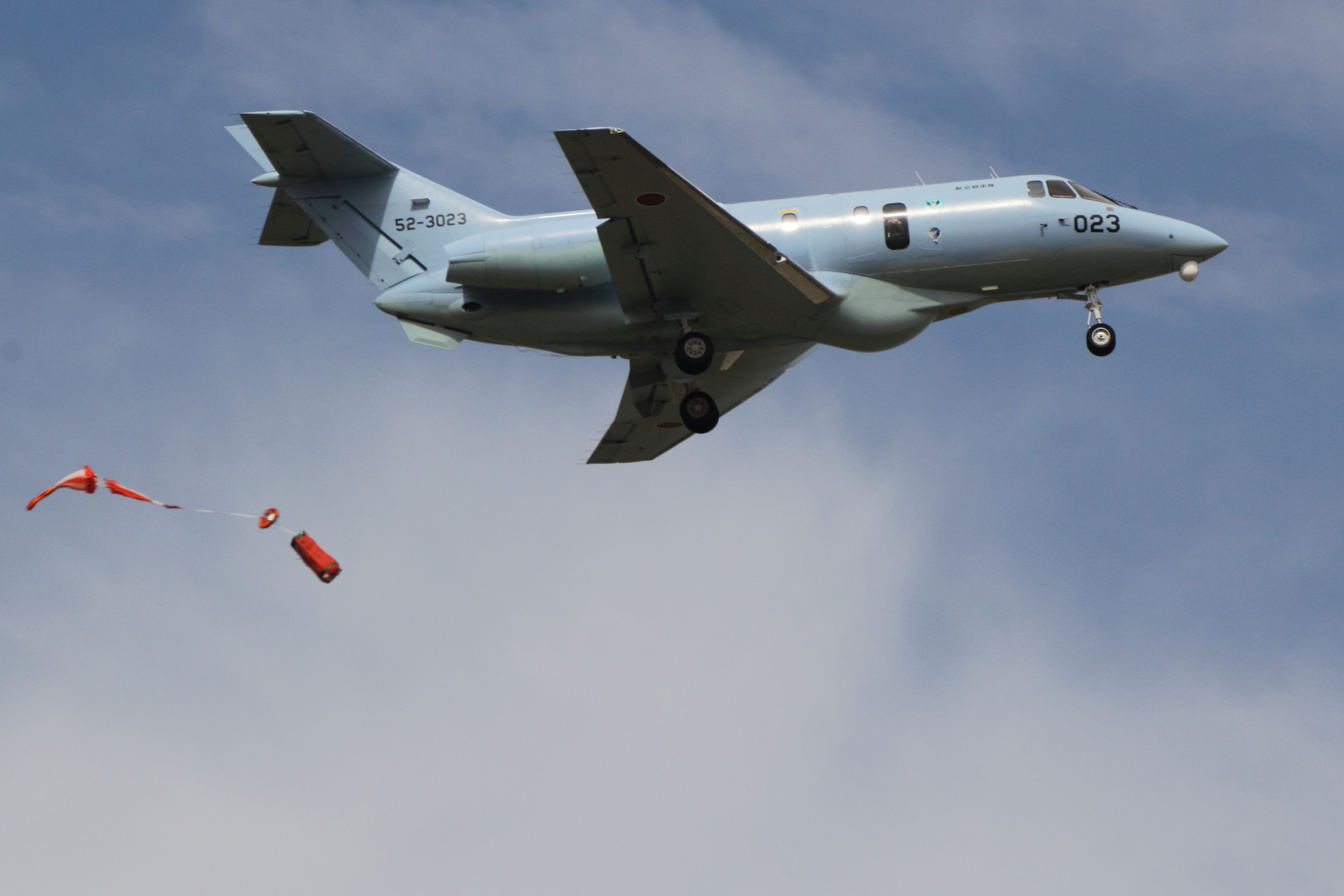
U-125A dropping inflatable boat

- UH-60J
- U-125A

== Animated Series ==
The animated Japanese series "Yomigaeru Sora – Rescue Wings" utilizes the Komatsu Rescue SQ for reference.
