= Air Rescue Wing Komaki Detachment (JASDF) =

Unit of the Japan Air Self-Defense Force

- 小牧救難隊
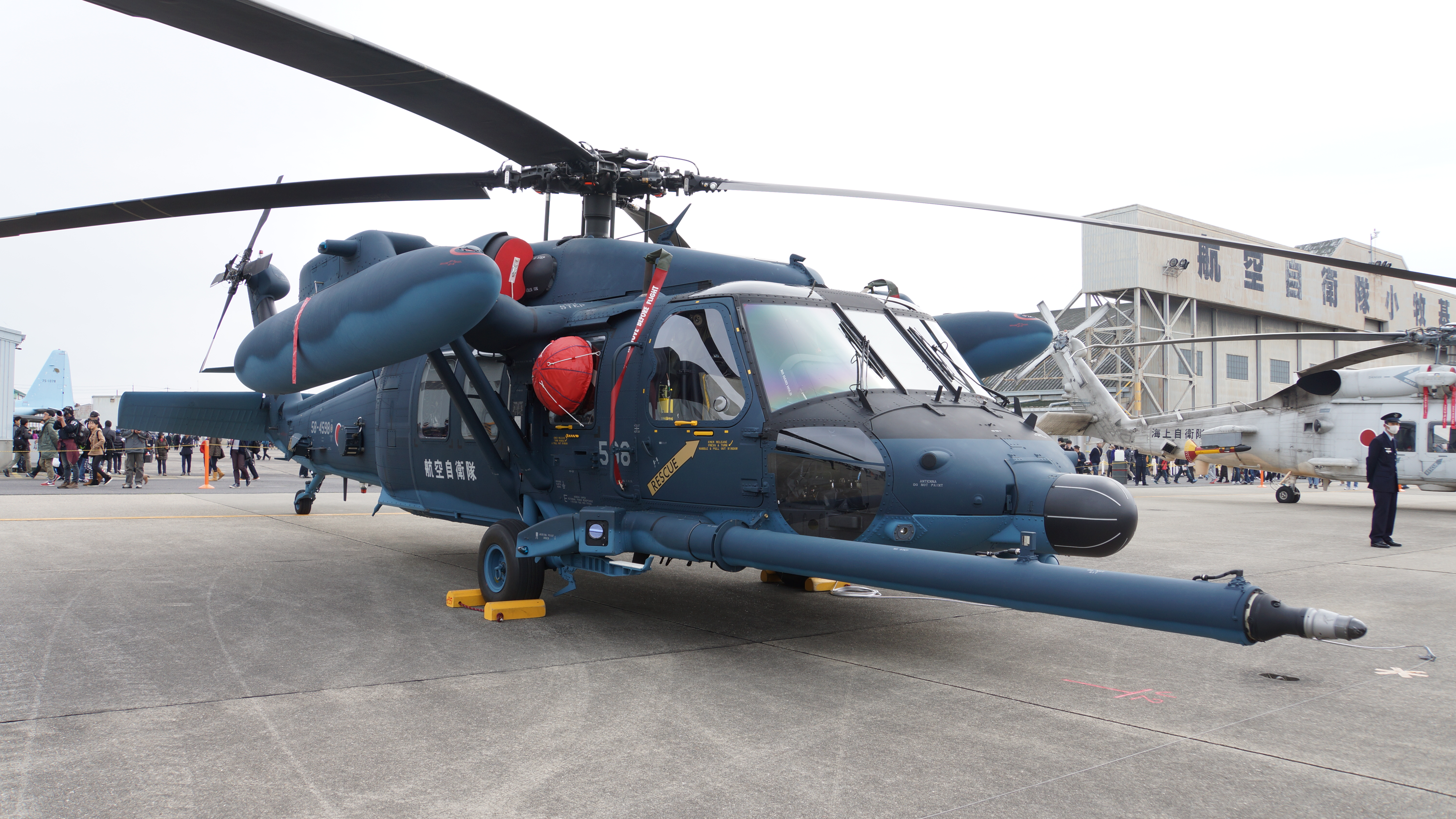
- Komaki Detachment UH-60J (2016)
- Country: Japan
- Branch: Japan Air Self-Defense Force
- Part of: Air Rescue Wing
- Garrison/HQ: Komaki Air Base
- Motto(s): That others may live

Aircraft flown
- UH-60J, U-125A

The Air Rescue Wing Komaki Detachment (小牧救難隊 (komaki-kyūnan-tai)) is a unit of the Air Rescue Wing of the Japan Air Self-Defense Force. It is also known as the Komaki Air Rescue Squadron. Responsible for airborne search and rescue, it is based at Komaki Air Base in Aichi Prefecture. It is equipped with UH-60J and U-125A aircraft. It is the training unit for the Air Rescue Wing.

== Tail markings ==
Detachment UH-60J aircraft do not have special markings. JASDF aircraft usually have unit markings on their tail, but U-125A aircraft of the Air Rescue Wing have their markings on their fuselage, usually with a sticker below showing which base they are assigned to.

== Aircraft operated ==
- UH-60J
- U-125A
