= Iruma Air Base =

Japanese air base in Saitama, Kantō, Japan

Iruma Air Base 入間基地
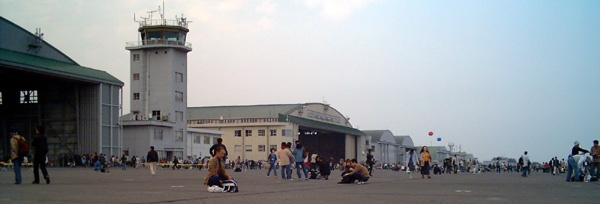
- IATA: none; ICAO: RJTJ

Summary
- Airport type: Military
- Operator: JASDF
- Location: Sayama, Saitama, Japan
- Elevation AMSL: 295 ft / 90 m
- Coordinates: 35°50′31″N 139°24′38″E

Map
- Location in Japan

Runways
Direction	Length		Surface
Direction	m	ft	Surface
17/35	2,000	6,562	Asphalt concrete
- Source: Japanese AIP at AIS Japan

Iruma Air Base (入間基地, Iruma-kichi) (ICAO: RJTJ) is a Japan Air Self-Defense Force (JASDF) base located in the city of Sayama, Saitama Prefecture, north of western Tokyo, Japan.

It was the airfield for the Imperial Japanese Army Air Force Academy until 1945, when it became Johnson Air Force base of the United States Air Force during and after the occupation of Japan. Johnson AB was completely returned to the Government of Japan in 1978.

Currently, Iruma Air Base is home to the Air Defense Command Headquarters Flight Group. Aircraft located at the base include the U-4, NAMC YS-11, T-4, and Kawasaki C-1. Its annual air show on the November 3rd Culture Day holiday is a popular public event.

== History ==
=== World War II ===
Iruma was established in 1937 by the Imperial Japanese Army Air Force and named Irumagawa Airfield. Opened in December 1938, it was the air academy for the Japanese Army Air Force, with its academy located at the nearby town. Mostly training aircraft operated from the base, including Kawasaki Ki-10 (Army Type 95 Fighter Model 1) biplanes painted orange. During World War II, the IJAAF 14th Sentai operated Mitsubishi Ki-67 medium bombers from Irumagawa. Attacked several times by USAAF B-29 Superfortress bombers, the last missions by the IJAAF were one-way missions using Yokosuka MXY7 Ohka purpose-built, rocket-powered, human-guided, anti-shipping kamikaze attack planes against American ships operating off the coast.

=== American use ===
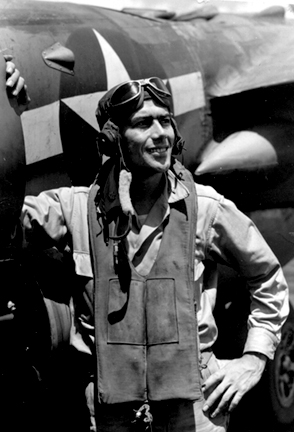
USAAF Lieutenant Colonel Gerald R. Johnson

After the end of the war, the United States Army Air Forces Fifth Air Force headquarters on Okinawa was moved to Japan and was established at Irumagawa on 25 September 1945. The base was renamed Johnson Air Base in honor of Lieutenant Colonel Gerald R. Johnson, the former commander of the USAAF 49th Fighter Group who was killed in a B-25 Mitchell crash while on approach to Irumagawa during a typhoon.

Johnson Air Base was a major United States Air Force base in Japan during the occupation years, then later during the Korean War and the 1950s. USAF Far East Air Force (Later Pacific Air Forces) command units based at Johnson were:

- Rankin's Raiders, US Navy PBY-5 and 5A Catalinas
- Headquarters, Fifth Air Force, September 1945 – January 1946
- Headquarters, 314th Composite Wing, June 1946 – August 1948
- Headquarters, 41st Air Division, March 1952 – June 1962

Operational USAF units based at Johnson were:

- 71st Reconnaissance Group, April–October 1947 (F-6/P-51 Mustang)

During the postwar years, the unit photographed areas of Japan and South Korea, which in 1950, provided much of the initial intelligence of the area when the Korean War broke out.

- 35th Fighter Group (later Wing), October 1945 – April 1950; August–December 1950; May 1951 – August 1954 (F-51 Mustang, F-61 Black Widow, F-82 Twin Mustang, F-80 Shooting Star, F-86 Sabre)

Initially flew air defense missions in Japan as part of the army of occupation. Engaged in combat operations in South Korea after the June 1950 invasion by North Korea. Reassigned back without personnel and equipment back to Johnson AB in May 1951, replacing 4th Fighter Wing where it was remanned and equipped with F-51s and F-80s; returned to the air defense mission for Japan. Moved to Yokota AB in October 1954 when 3d Bomb Wing moved back to Johnson from South Korea.

- 157th Liaison Squadron, at least most of 1946 (L-5 Sentinel)
- 4th Fighter Wing, December 1950 – March 1951 (F-86 Sabre)

Arrived in Japan in December 1950 with F-86 Sabres aboard aircraft carriers. The primary mission of the wing was air superiority, and the Sabre was capable of battling the North Korean Soviet-built MiG-15 on equal terms. From Johnson AB detachments deployed in mid-December to bases in South Korea, rotating between South Korea and Japan through February 1951. Then, the 4th FW moved in stages to South Korea, with all elements moved to South Korea by March.

- 3d Bombardment Wing, March 1950 – August 1951; October 1954 – November 1960 (B-26 Invader, B-57B Canberra)

Initially trained as a B-26 Invader bombardment and reconnaissance wing as part of the army of occupation. When the Korean War broke out in June 1950, the 3 BW began flying combat missions from Johnson, attacking North Korean forces as they invaded and moved southward. The first Americans to lose their lives during the Korean War, 1st Lt Remer L. Harding and SSgt William Goodwin, were assigned to the 13th Bombardment Squadron when they lost their lives 28 June 1950 returning from a sortie on the Korean Peninsula. Captain John S. Walmsley, Jr. was posthumously awarded the Medal of Honor for his actions on 14 September 1951: flying a night mission in a B-26 from Johnson. Moved to Kunsan AB (K-8), South Korea in August 1951.

Transferred back to Johnson in October 1954 after the Korean armistice replacing 35th Fighter Wing. Main operational wing at Johnson AB throughout the 1950s, initially equipped with B-26s, later updated to jet B-57 Canberra tactical bombers in 1956. Moved to Yokota Air Base in November 1960 with the phasedown of USAF operations at Johnson AB.

=== Transition to JASDF ===
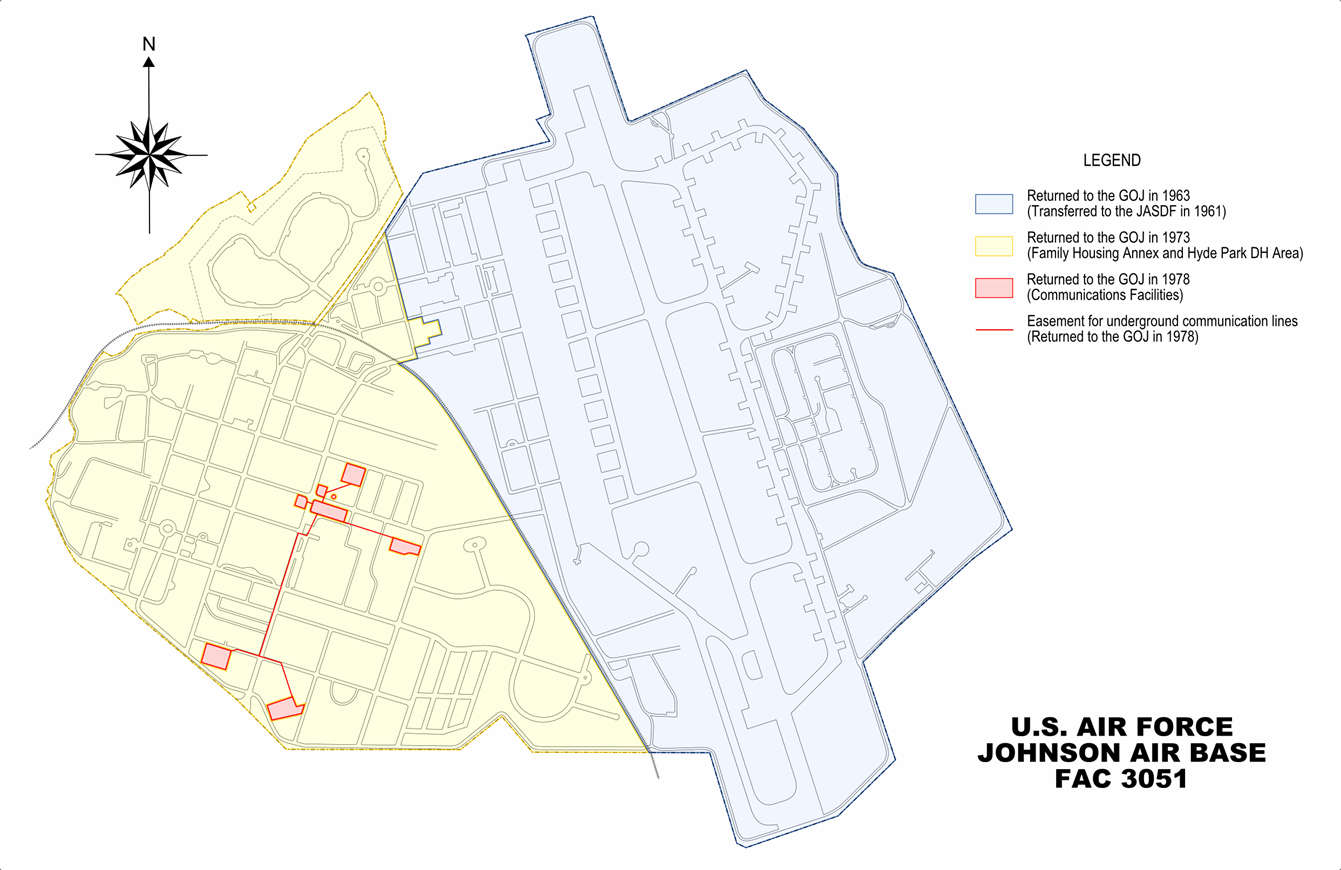
Johnson AB was completely returned to the GOJ in 1978.

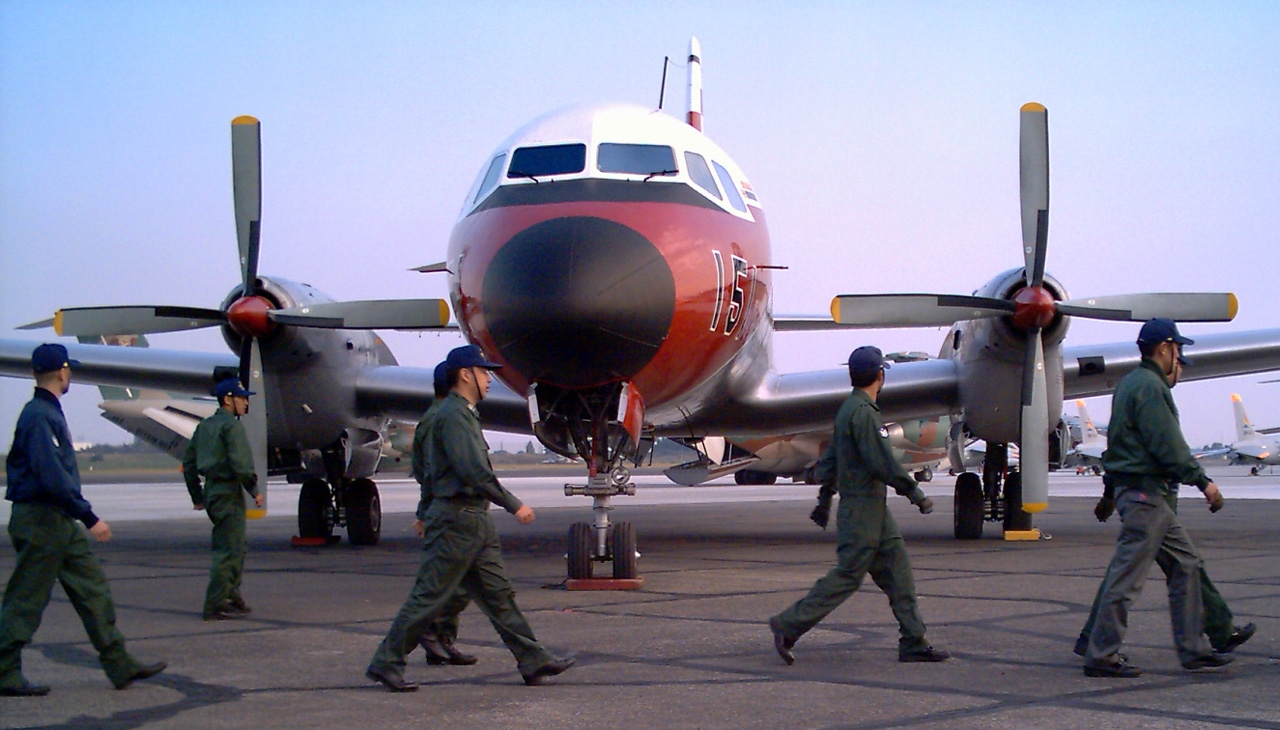
Japan Self-Defense Forces in 2006.

In August 1958, the JASDF Central Air Defense Force headquarters and Iruma Air Base were established at Johnson Air Base.

On 30 December 1960, the American facilities on the site of Johnson Air Base were re-designated as "Johnson Air Station".

In June 1961, Japan-US joint use agreement was established at Johnson.

In June 1962, the USAF ended its use of the air base, when the 41st Air Division headquarters moved to Yokota AB.

On 1 January 1963, the buildings of the air station were re-purposed for American family housing in Japan as "Johnson Family Housing Annex". The USAF 6102d Air Base Squadron became the host unit at Johnson, supporting the 6022d USAF Hospital and family housing civil engineering flights.

In November 1963, the base transitioned from USAF management to the JASDF.

On 28 June 1973, the USAF support units were inactivated, and most of their associated facilities were transferred back to the Japan Air Self-Defense Force. The major facilities retained by USAF at Johnson were the telecommunications center, telephone exchange, admin office, Aircom MW relay, electrical power stations, and HF antennas. These facilities were transferred to the control of the 475th Air Base Wing at Yokota AB and continuously operated by the AFCS 1956th Communications Group until MW tower relocated to the USAF Tokorozawa Transmitter Site, approximately 4 miles (6.4 km) southeast from Johnson.

In September 1978, the last USAF facilities were closed and completely returned to the Government of Japan.

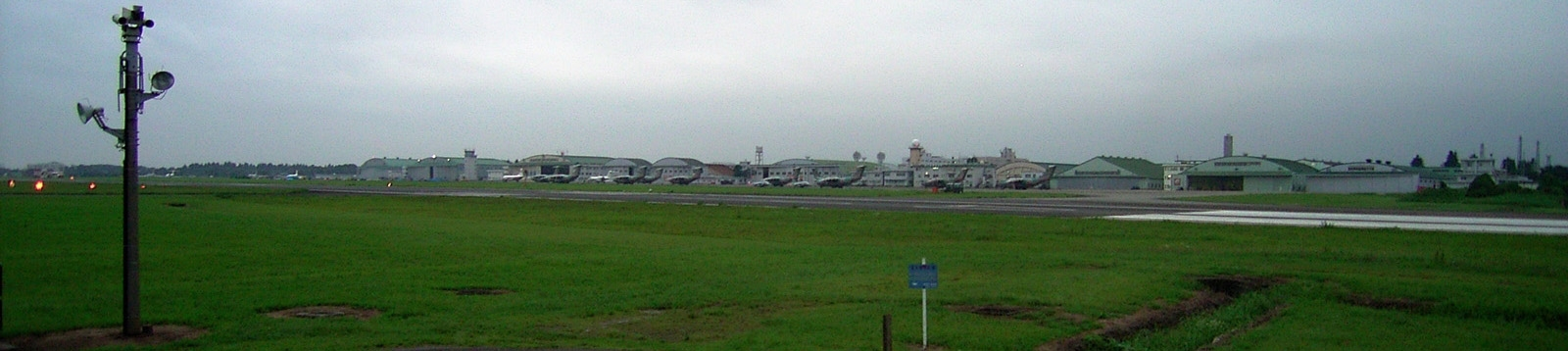
Iruma Air Base.

== Iruma Air Show ==
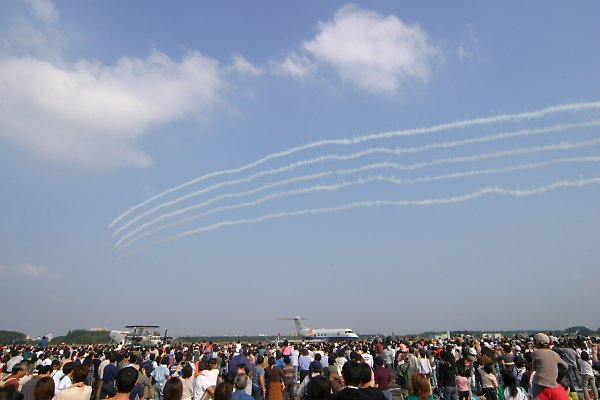
Blue Impulse at the Iruma Air Show (2004)

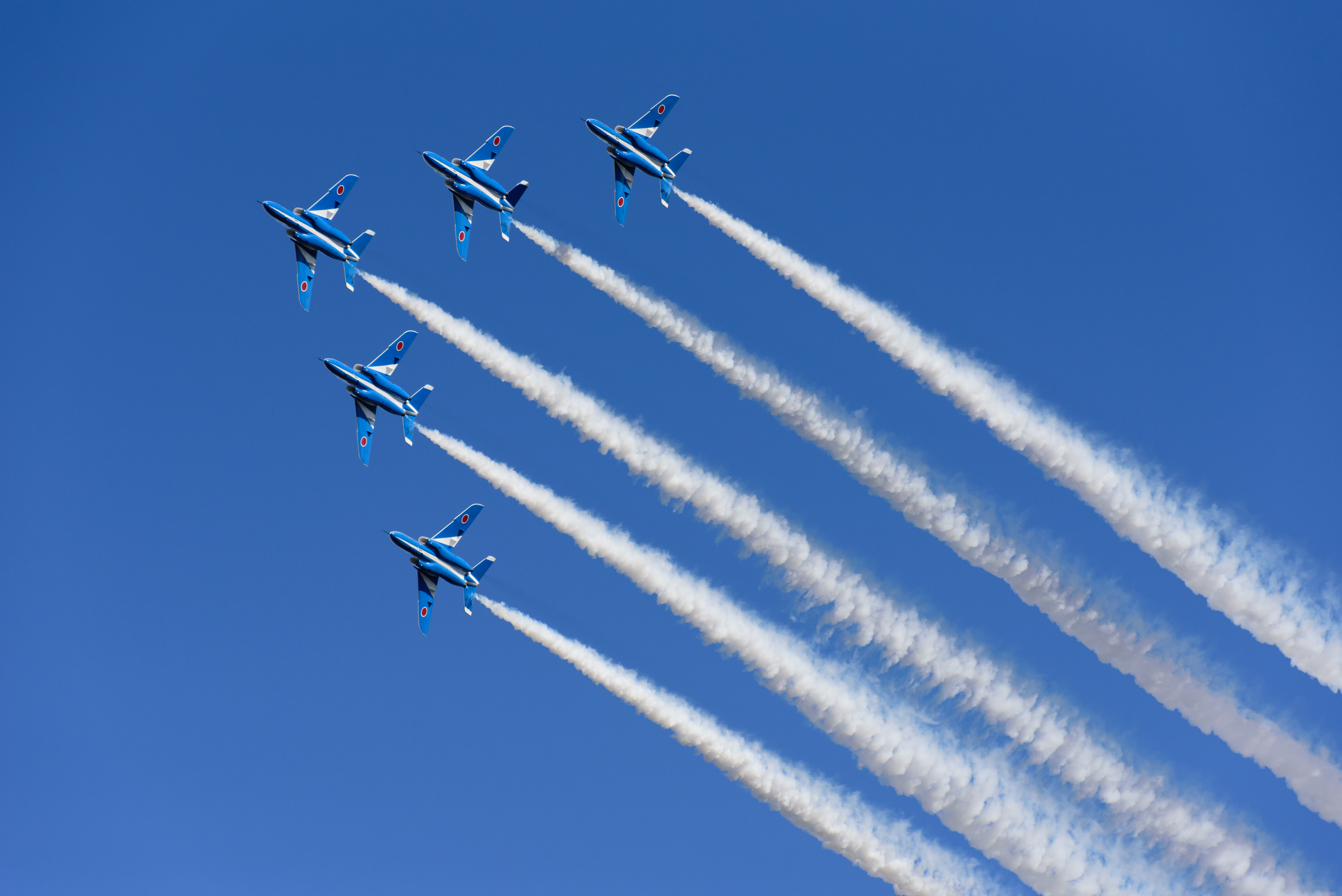
Blue Impulse at the Iruma Air Show (2015)

The Iruma Air Show is held annually on the November 3rd Culture Day. It generally takes place under clear blue skies. The event features ground displays of various military aircraft from all three branches of the Japan Self-Defense Forces and a performance by Blue Impulse, the JASDF's aerobatics team. Police department helicopters are also usually on ground display.

A speaker at the 2010 air show sparked controversy when he criticized the government.

Due to the base's proximity to Tokyo a large number of spectators attend the event each year, although numbers can fluctuate. In 2015 the attendance was approximately 200,000, in 2016 it was 130,000 and in 2017 around 210,000 people came to the event.

== Tenant squadrons ==
As of 2017, the following units are based at Iruma:

- Flight Check Squadron (YS-11FC, U-125)
- Central Air Command Support Squadron (Kawasaki T-4, U-4)
- Electronic Warfare Squadron (Kawasaki EC-1, YS-11EA)
- Electronic Intelligence Squadron (YS-11EB)
- Air Rescue Wing (U-125A)
  - Iruma Helicopter Airlift Squadron (CH-47J)
- 2nd Tactical Airlift Group
  - 402nd Tactical Airlift Squadron (Kawasaki C-1, U-4)

== Notes ==
- ]
