= Air Rescue Wing Naha Detachment (JASDF) =

- 那覇救難隊
- Country: Japan
- Branch: Japan Air Self-Defense Force
- Part of: Air Rescue Wing
- Garrison/HQ: Naha Air Base
- Motto(s): That others may live

Aircraft flown
- UH-60J, U-125A

The Air Rescue Wing Naha Detachment (那覇救難隊 (naha-kyūnan-tai)) is a unit of the Air Rescue Wing of the Japan Air Self-Defense Force. It is also known as the Naha Air Rescue Squadron. Responsible for airborne search and rescue, it is based at Naha Air Base in Okinawa Prefecture. It is equipped with UH-60J and U-125A aircraft.

== History ==
On May 28, 2013 an F-15C of the US Air Force's 44th Fighter Squadron crashed into the ocean off Okinawa. The pilot ejected and was rescued by the detachment.

On June 11, 2018 the detachment rescued the pilot of another US F-15C from the 44th Fighter Squadron based at Kadena Air Base that ejected over the sea off Okinawa.

== Tail markings ==
Detachment UH-60J aircraft do not have special markings. JASDF aircraft usually have unit markings on their tail, but U-125A aircraft of the Air Rescue Wing have a marking on their fuselage, usually with a sticker below showing which base they are assigned to.

== Aircraft operated ==
- UH-60J
- U-125A
