= Electronic Warfare Squadron (JASDF) =

- 電子戦訓練支援機
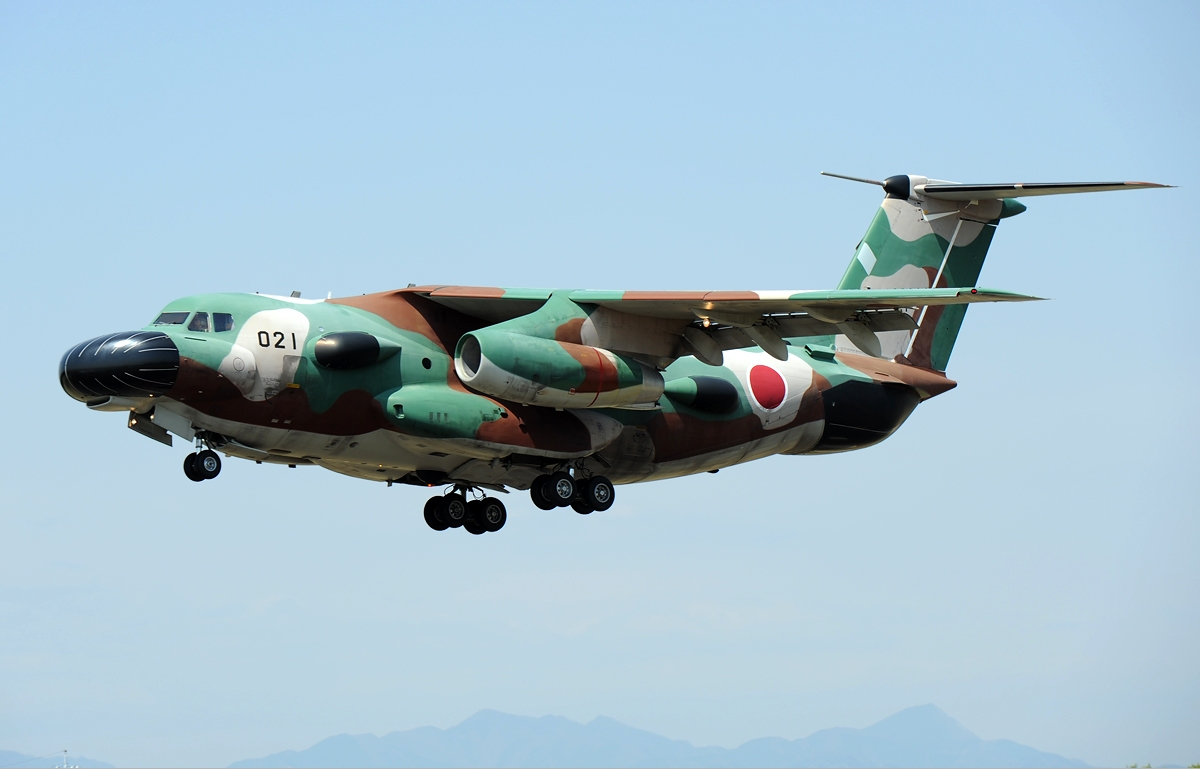
- Kawasaki EC-1 (2011)
- Country: Japan
- Branch: Japan Air Self-Defense Force
- Part of: Air Tactics Development Wing
- Garrison/HQ: Iruma Air Base

Aircraft flown
- Electronic warfare: EC-1, YS-11EA

The Electronic Warfare Squadron (電子戦訓練支援機, denshisenkunrenshienki) is a squadron of the Japan Air Self-Defense Force based at Iruma Air Base in Saitama Prefecture north of Tokyo. It operates under the authority of the Air Tactics Development Wing. The squadron operates Kawasaki EC-1 and YS-11EB aircraft.
