= Naha Helicopter Airlift Squadron (JASDF) =

- 那覇ヘリコプター空輸隊
- Active: March 31, 1992-present
- Country: Japan
- Branch: Japan Air Self-Defense Force
- Part of: Air Rescue Wing
- Garrison/HQ: Naha Air Base

Aircraft flown
- Trainer: CH-47J

The Naha Helicopter Airlift Squadron (那覇ヘリコプター空輸隊 (naha-herikoputa-kūyu-tai)) also known as the Naha Helicopter Transport Squadron is a unit of the Japan Air Self-Defense Force. It comes under the authority of the Air Rescue Wing. It is based at Naha Air Base in Okinawa Prefecture. It is equipped with CH-47J aircraft.

== History ==
On March 7, 2018, on a training flight over Okinoerabujima in Kagoshima Prefecture, the rear cargo door of a CH-47J of the Air Rescue Wing fell off. The aircraft was doing take-off and landing drills. No injuries were reported.

== Tail marking ==
As with other helicopter airlift squadrons, it has the emblem of the Air Rescue Wing with a sticker stating the home base of the unit.

== Aircraft operated ==
- CH-47J
