= Misawa Helicopter Airlift Squadron (JASDF) =

- 三沢ヘリコプター空輸隊
- Active: March 31, 1991-present
- Country: Japan
- Branch: Japan Air Self-Defense Force
- Part of: Air Rescue Wing
- Garrison/HQ: Misawa Air Base

Aircraft flown
- Trainer: CH-47J

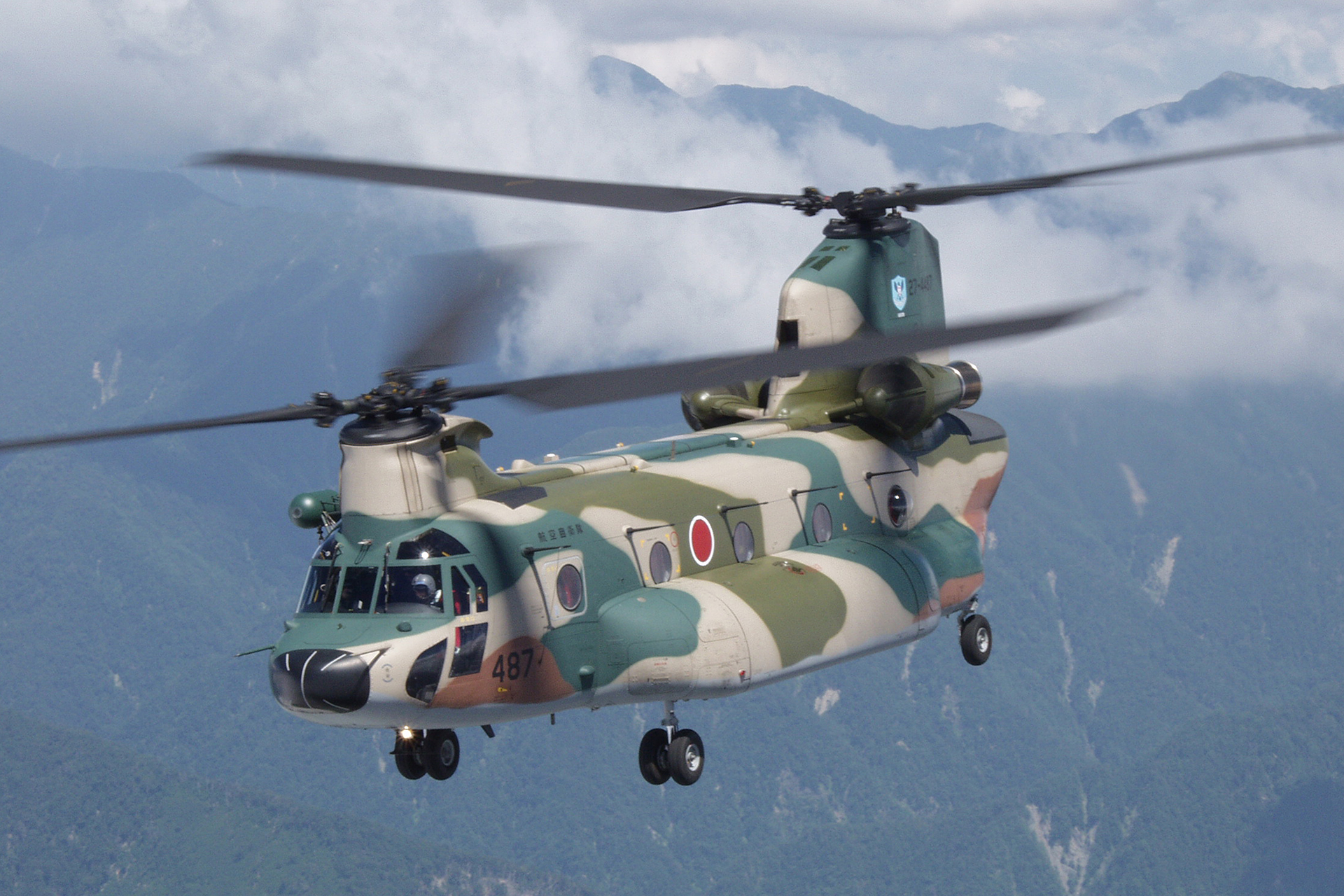

The Misawa Helicopter Airlift Squadron (三沢ヘリコプター空輸隊 (misawa-herikoputa-kūyu-tai)) also known as the Misawa Helicopter Transport Squadron is a unit of the Japan Air Self-Defense Force. It comes under the authority of the Air Rescue Wing. It is based at Misawa Air Base in Aomori Prefecture. It is equipped with CH-47J aircraft.

== Tail marking ==
As with other helicopter airlift squadrons, it has the emblem of the Air Rescue Wing with a sticker stating the home base of the unit.

== Aircraft operated ==
- CH-47J (1989-present)
