= Iruma Helicopter Airlift Squadron (JASDF) =

- 入間ヘリコプター空輸隊
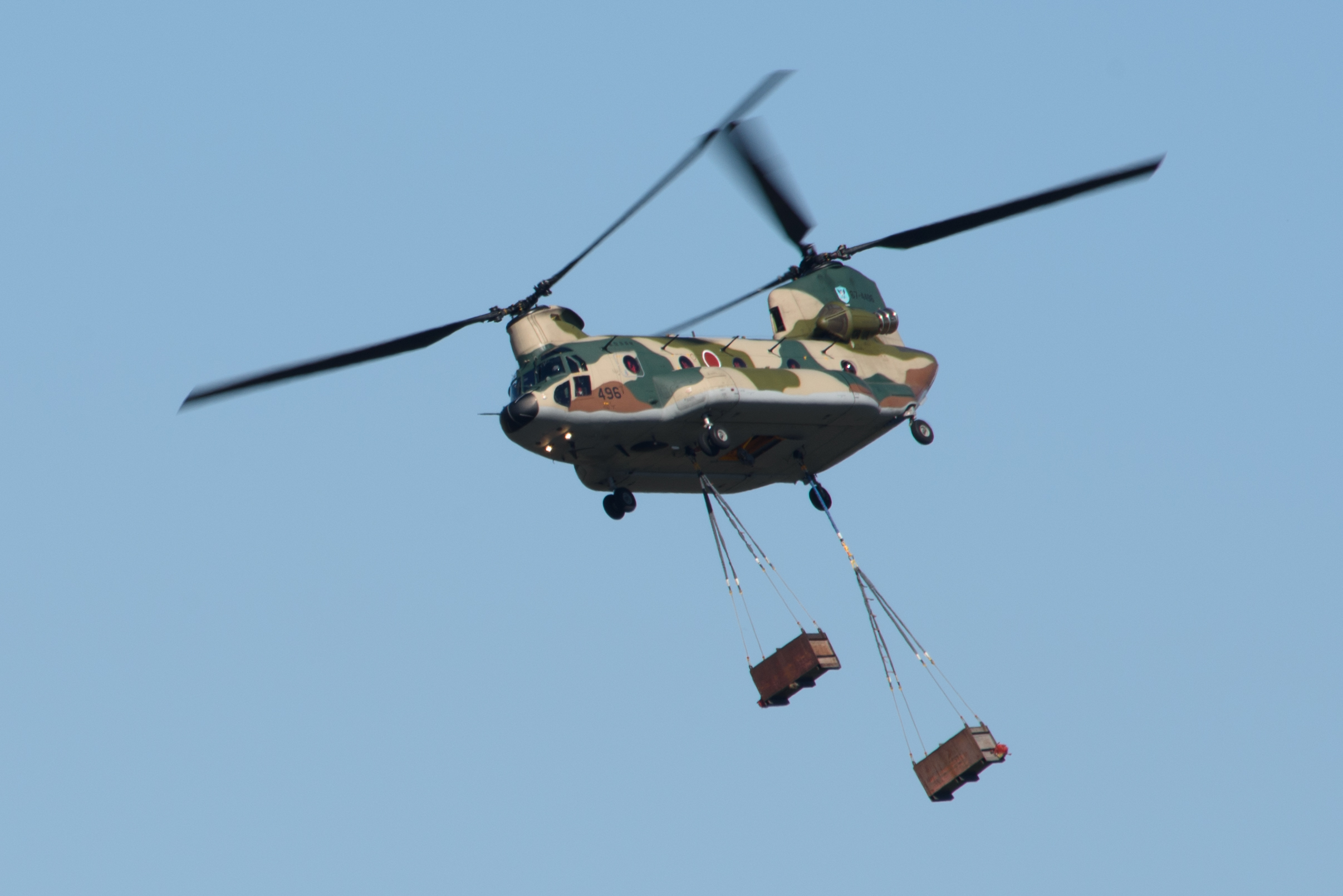
- Iruma Squadron CH-47JA (2015)
- Country: Japan
- Branch: Japan Air Self-Defense Force
- Part of: Air Rescue Wing
- Garrison/HQ: Iruma Air Base

Aircraft flown
- Trainer: CH-47J

The Iruma Helicopter Airlift Squadron (入間ヘリコプター空輸隊 (iruma-herikoputa-kūyu-tai)) also known as the Iruma Helicopter Transport Squadron is a unit of the Japan Air Self-Defense Force. It comes under the authority of the Air Rescue Wing. It is based at Iruma Air Base in Saitama Prefecture. It is equipped with CH-47J aircraft.

== Tail marking ==
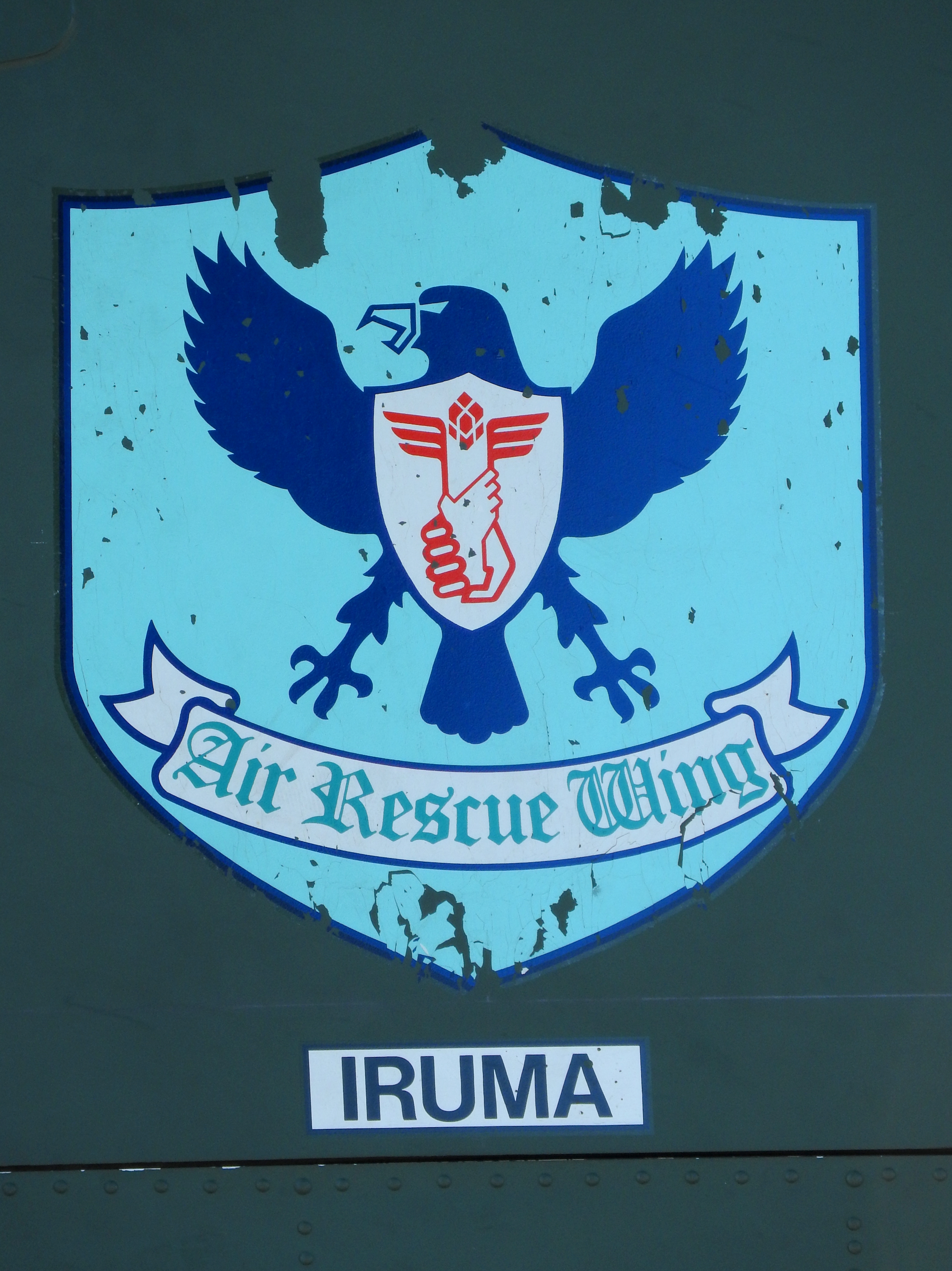
Tail marking (2016)

As with other helicopter airlift squadrons, it has the emblem of the Air Rescue Wing with a sticker stating the home base of the unit.

== Aircraft operated ==
- CH-47J
