= 44th Fighter Squadron =

44th Fighter Squadron

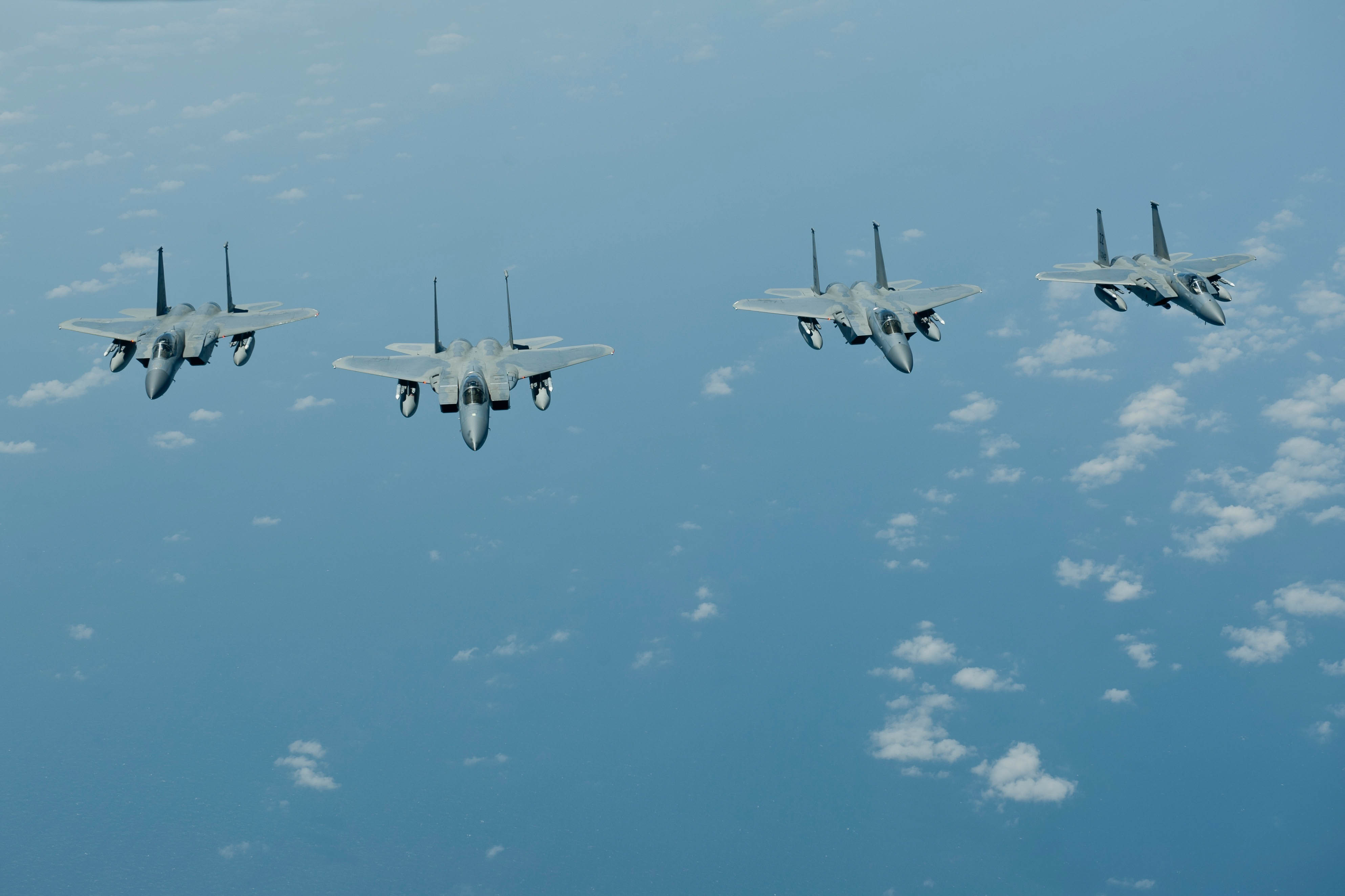
- Four F-15C Eagles in formation off the coast of Japan
- Active: 1941–2023 (Inactive due to no aircraft)
- Country: United States
- Branch: United States Air Force
- Role: Fighter
- Part of: Pacific Air Forces
- Garrison/HQ: Kadena Air Base
- Nickname: Vampires
- Engagements: Southwest Pacific Theater; Vietnam War; Global war on terrorism
- Decorations: Distinguished Unit Citation; Presidential Unit Citation; Air Force Outstanding Unit Award with Combat "V" Device; Air Force Outstanding Unit Award; Philippine Presidential Unit Citation; Republic of Vietnam Gallantry Cross with Palm

Commanders
- Notable commanders: Robert Westbrook; Carrol Chandler; Ryan Corrigan

Insignia
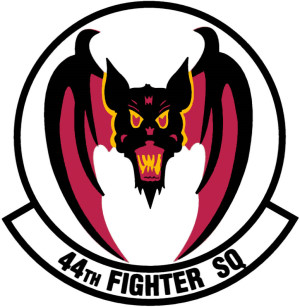
- 44th Fighter Squadron emblem (approved 18 February 1942)

The 44th Fighter Squadron is a unit of the United States Air Force, part of the 18th Wing at Kadena Air Base in Okinawa, Japan. The 44th Pursuit Squadron was activated on 1 January 1941 and assigned to the 18th Pursuit Group. The 44th Fighter Squadron was equipped with the F-15C/D Eagle, and is planned to transition to the F-15EX Eagle II in 2026.

== Mission ==
The 44 FS operated the F-15C Eagle aircraft conducting air superiority missions.

== History ==
=== World War II ===
The 44th Flew patrols over the Pacific from Hawaii from 7 December 1941 – October 1942. It went on to fly combat missions in the South and Southwest Pacific from 21 December 1942 – 15 August 1945.

=== Vietnam War ===
It again flew combat missions in Southeast Asia from 18 December 1964 – 25 February 1965, 21 April – 22 June 1965, 19 – 29 October 1965, and 25 April 1967 – 6 October 1970.

The squadron was unmanned from 31 December 1966 – 24 April 1967 and November 1970–15 May 1971.

=== Japan ===
It has flown air defense over Okinawa and Japan since 1971.

On 17 January 2006 an F-15C of the squadron crashed into the Pacific Ocean near Okinawa. The pilot ejected and was rescued by an HH-60 of the 33d Rescue Squadron.

The 44th Fighter Squadron was named as the winner of the Raytheon Trophy for 2012.

=== Taiwan ===
From 3–30 September 1955, 44th Fighter-Bomber Squadron Deployed to Taoyuan Air Base, Taiwan with F-86 Sabre, returning again in 1962-1963 in support of “BLUE SKY” military exercise in Kung Kuan Air Base, Taiwan, equipped F-100 Super Sabre.

The 44th Tactical Fighter Squadron was deployed to Ching Chuan Kang Air Base in Taichung from 6 November 1972 to 10 April 1975, using F-4 Phantom II to assist Taiwan’s air defense.

=== 2013 Sequestration ===
Air Combat Command officials announced a stand down and reallocation of flying hours for the rest of the fiscal year 2013 due to mandatory budget cuts. The across-the board spending cuts, called sequestration, took effect 1 March when Congress failed to agree on a deficit-reduction plan.

Squadrons either stood down on a rotating basis or kept combat ready or at a reduced readiness level called "basic mission capable" for part or all of the remaining months in fiscal 2013. This affected the 44th Fighter Squadron with a reduction of its flying hours, placing it into a basic mission capable status from 5 April-30 September 2013.

=== Recent events ===
On 28 May 2013 an F-15C of the squadron crashed into the ocean off Okinawa. The pilot ejected and was rescued by the Air Rescue Wing Naha Detachment of the Japan Air Self-Defense Force.

On 11 June 2018 the pilot of another F-15C from the squadron ejected over the sea off Okinawa. This pilot was also rescued by the Air Rescue Wing Naha Detachment of the Japan Air Self-Defense Force.

== Lineage ==
- Constituted as the 44th Pursuit Squadron (Interceptor) on 22 November 1940

Activated on 1 January 1941
Redesignated 44th Fighter Squadron on 15 May 1942
Redesignated 44th Fighter Squadron, Two Engine on 26 January 1944
Redesignated 44th Fighter Squadron, Single Engine on 6 May 1946
Redesignated 44th Fighter Squadron, Jet on 23 December 1949
Redesignated 44th Fighter-Bomber Squadron on 20 January 1950
Redesignated 44th Tactical Fighter Squadron on 1 July 1958
Redesignated 44th Fighter Squadron on 1 October 1991

=== Assignments ===
- 18th Pursuit Group (later 18th Fighter Group), 1 January 1941
- 318th Fighter Group, 20 October 1942
- South Pacific Area, 1 December 1942
- Thirteenth Air Force, 4 January 1943
- 18th Fighter Group (later 18th Fighter-Bomber Group), 30 March 1943

Attached to 18th Fighter-Bomber Wing 25 July – 30 November 1950, 6200th Air Base Wing until 30 January 1953, Thirteenth Air Force until 10 November 1954
Attached to Thirteenth Air Force 11 December 1954 – 4 January 1955, 6200th Air Base Wing until January 1955, Air Task Group Fifth, Provisional until 16 February 1955, 6200th Air Base Wing until 14 July 1955
Attached to Air Task Force 13, Provisional 3–30 September 1955
Attached to 314th Air Division 15–18 April 1956
Attached to 18th Fighter-Bomber Wing after 1 February 1957

- 18th Fighter-Bomber Wing (later 18 Tactical Fighter Wing), 1 October 1957

Attached to 2d Air Division 18 December 1964 – 25 February 1965, 21 April–23 June 1965, and 19–29 October 1965

- 388th Tactical Fighter Wing, 25 April 1967 (attached to 355th Tactical Fighter Wing after 10 October 1969)
- 355th Tactical Fighter Wing, 15 October 1969
- Thirteenth Air Force, 10 December 1970
- 18th Tactical Fighter Wing, 15 March 1971

Attached to 3d Tactical Fighter Wing, 2 April – 2 June 1972 and 28 July – 8 September 1972
Attached to 327th Air Division, 6 November 1972 – 5 August 1973, 26 August – 16 September 1973, 7–28 October 1973, 18 November – 9 December 1973, 30 December 1973 – 20 January 1974, 10 February – 2 March 1974, 23 March – 13 April 1974, 4–25 May 1974, 15 June – 6 July 1974, 27 July – 16 August 1974, 5 September – 17 October 1974, 30 November 1974 – 9 January 1975, and 20 February – 10 April 1975

- 18th Tactical Fighter Group, 1 May 1978
- 18th Tactical Fighter Wing, 11 February 1981
- 18th Operations Group, 1 October 1991 – 2023

=== Stations ===
- Wheeler Field, Hawaii, 1 January 1941
- Bellows Field, Hawaii, 7 November 1941
- Wheeler Field, Hawaii, 12 December 1941
- Kaneohe Field, Hawaii, 27 December 1941
- Wheeler Field], Hawaii, 25 January 1942
- Bellows Field, Hawaii, 23 June – 23 October 1942
- Efate Airfield, New Hebrides 7 November 1942

Air echelon operated from Henderson Field, Guadalcanal, Solomon Islands, 20 December 1942 – 20 March 1944

- Luganville Airfield, Espiritu Santo, New Hebrides, 25 October 1943

Air echelon operated from Mono Airfield, Stirling Island, Solomon Islands, 20 March – 25 April 1944
Air echelon operated from Henderson Field, Guadalcanal, Solomon Islands, 11 May – 16 July 1944

- Henderson Field, Guadalcanal, Solomon Islands, 17 July 1944
- Cape Opmarai Airfield, Netherlands East Indies, 23 August 1944

Air echelon operated from Wama Airfield, Morotai, Netherlands East Indies, 7 November 1944 – 16 January 1945

- Lingayen Airfield, Luzon, Philippines, 13 January 1945
- McGuire Field, San Jose, Mindoro, Philippines, 26 February 1945

Air echelon operated from Puerto Princesa Airfield, Palawan, Philippines, 26 April – 13 May 1945

- San Roque Airfield (Moret Field), Mindanao, Philippines, 4 May–November 1945
- Puerto Princesa Airfield, Palawan, Philippines, 10 November 1945
- Floridablanca Airfield, Luzon, Philippines, 17 July 1946
- Clark Field (later Clark Air Force Base), Luzon, Philippines, 3 October 1947

Deployed to Yontan Auxiliary Air Base, Okinawa 11 November – 11 December 1954, Taoyuan Air Base Formosa, 27 January – 17 February 1955)

- Kadena Air Base, Okinawa, 15 July 1955

Deployed to Taoyuan Air Base, Formosa, 3–30 September 1955
Deployed to Pyongtaek Air Base, South Korea, 15–18 April 1956
Deployed to Korat Royal Thai Air Force Base, Thailand, 18 December 1964 – 25 February 1965, 21 April – 22 June 1965, 10–29 October 1965 28 January 1966–8 April 1966

- Korat Royal Thai Air Force Base, Thailand, 25 April 1967

Deployed to Takhli Royal Thai Air Force Base, Thailand, 1–27 February 1969

- Takhli Royal Thai Air Force Base, Thailand, 10 October 1969 – 15 March 1971
- Kadena Air Base, Okinawa (later Japan), 15 March 1971–present

Deployed to Kunsan Air Base, South Korea, 2 April – 2 June 1972 and 28 July – 8 September 1972
Deployed to: Ching Chuan Kang Air Base, Taiwan, 6 November 1972 – 5 August 1973, 26 August – 16 September 1973, 7–28 October 1973, 18 November – 9 December 1973, 30 December 1973 – 20 January 1974, 10 February – 2 March 1974, 23 March – 13 April 1974, 4–25 May 1974, 15 June – 6 July 1974, 27 July – 16 August 1974, 5 September – 17 October 1974, 30 November 1974 – 9 January 1975, and 20 February – 10 April 1975
Deployed to Prince Sultan Air Base, Kingdom of Saudi Arabia, May 1998
Deployed to Prince Sultan Air Base, Kingdom of Saudi Arabia, March 2000
Deployed to Incirlik AB, Turkey, June 2001
Deployed to Prince Sultan Air Base, Kingdom of Saudi Arabia, September 2002, Operation Southern Watch
Deployed to: SW Asia, October 2011 – April 2012
Deployed to: Elmendorf Air Force Base, Anchorage, July 2012 – January 2013
Deployed to: Prince Sultan Air Base, Kingdom of Saudi Arabia, April 2020 - October 2020

=== Aircraft ===
- Curtiss P-40 Warhawk (1940–1942, 1943)
- Lockheed P-38 Lightning (1943–1946)
- North American P-51 Mustang (1946–1947, 1948–1950)
- Republic P-47 Thunderbolt (1946–1948)
- Lockheed F-80 Shooting Star (1946–1947, 1949–1954)
- North American F-86 Sabre (1954–1957)
- North American F-100 Super Sabre (1957–1964)
- Republic F-105 Thunderchief (1963–1970)
- McDonnell F-4 Phantom II (1971–1980)
- McDonnell Douglas F-15 Eagle (1979–2023)
- Boeing F-15EX Eagle II (2026, planned)
