= Hawker 800 =

Business jet

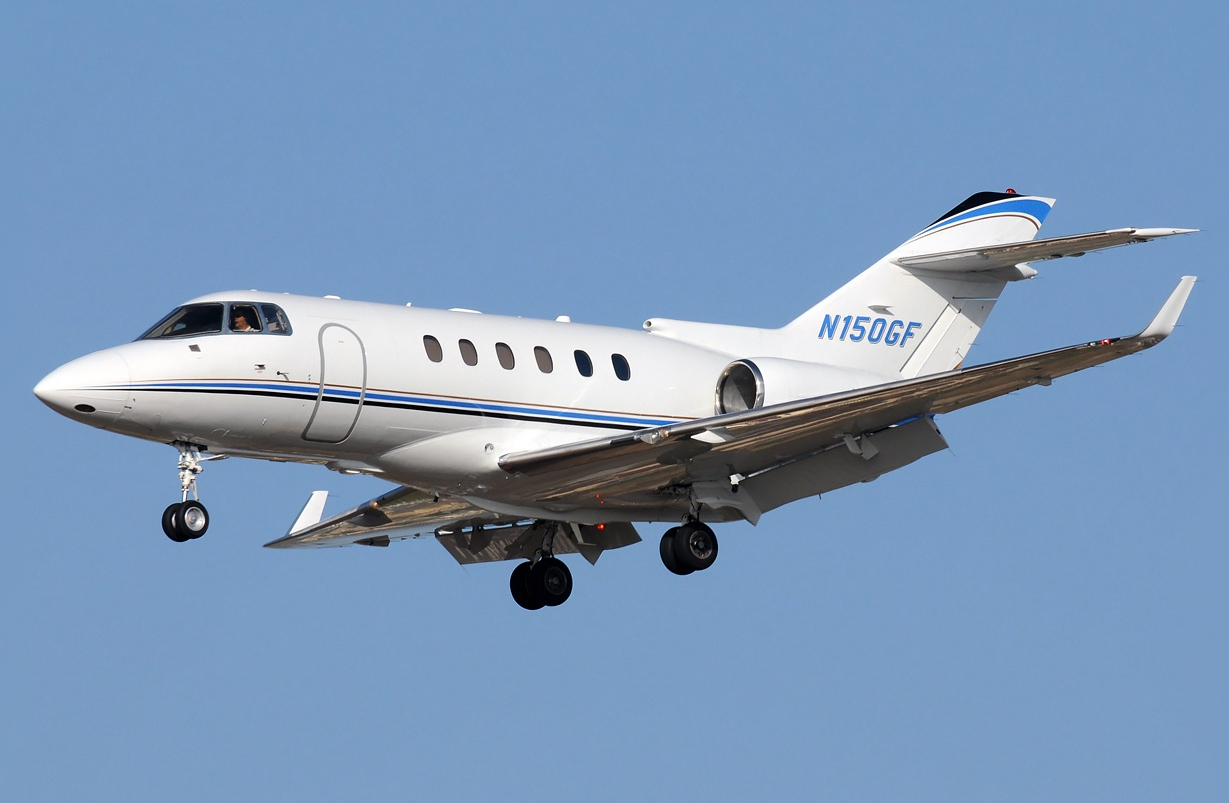
- Hawker 800 on approach

General information
- Type: Mid-size business jet
- National origin: United Kingdom
- Manufacturer: British Aerospace (BAe) (1983–1994); Raytheon (1994–2007); Hawker Beechcraft (2007–2013)
- Status: In service
- Primary users: Japan Air Self-Defense Force Brazilian Air Force; Royal Saudi Air Force
- Number built: 650

History
- Manufactured: 1983–2013
- First flight: 26 June 1983
- Developed from: British Aerospace 125

The Hawker 800 is a mid-size twinjet corporate aircraft. It is a development of the British Aerospace 125, and was assembled by Hawker Beechcraft.

== Development ==
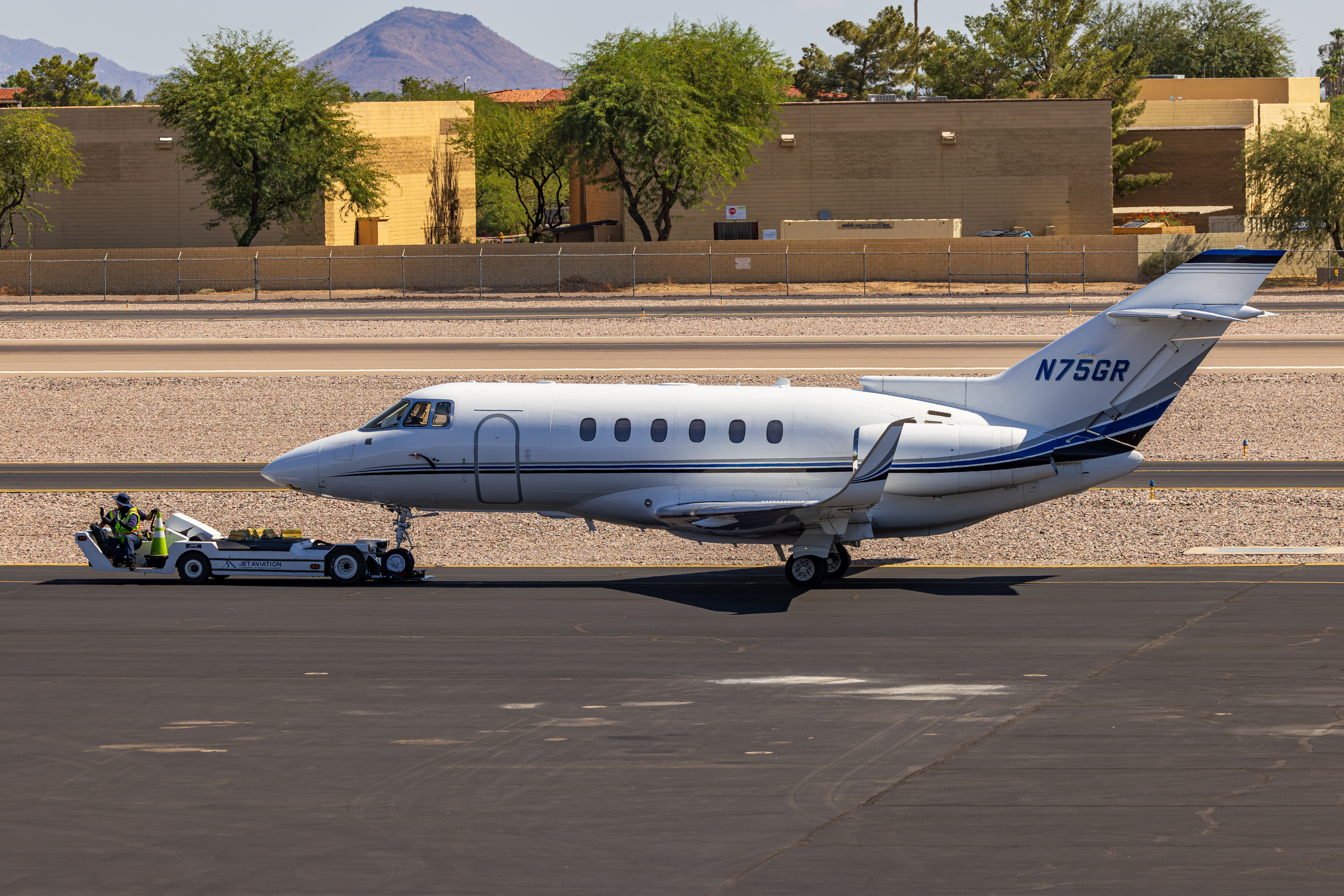
A Hawker 800XPi, registration N75GR, at Scottsdale Airport, Arizona, in October 2023

In April 1981, the British Aerospace (BAe) board sanctioned the programme to improve the British Aerospace 125-700 series. By May 1983, the new aircraft was ready for its first test flight.

The BAe 125-800 series has a number of modifications and changes over the 700, the most noticeable being the redesigned cockpit windscreen. Accompanying this are a modified rear fuselage fairing, as well as a glass cockpit and uprated (from 3,700 to 4,300 lb thrust) Garrett TFE731-5R-1H engines. British Aerospace incorporated wingtip devices to reduce drag and improve aerodynamic efficiency.

From the first BAe 125 flight in August 1962, it took nineteen years until the 500th airframe was sold. In about five years, British Aerospace was registering the 200th sale of the 800 series.

In 1994, Raytheon (which bought Beech Aircraft Corporation in 1980) acquired BAe Corporate Jets. The new entity was known as Raytheon Aircraft. In March 2007, Raytheon divested its aircraft manufacturing business to Hawker Beechcraft Corp., a company formed and controlled by Goldman Sachs Alternatives and Onex Partners of Canada.

The final version was the Hawker 850XP, which was certified for operation in March 2006. The 850XP is identical to the 800XP except that it includes winglets, which have extended its operating range by 100 nautical miles (190 km). This version also incorporates upgraded avionics and a redesigned interior. The Hawker 850XP essentially fills the gap left behind by the Hawker 1000 when production of that aircraft ceased. In 2006, its unit cost was $13,786,100.

In October 2006, two new variants were announced:

- The Hawker 750, in which the ventral fuel tank is replaced by an externally accessed baggage pannier, which reduces range slightly.
- The Hawker 900XP, using new Honeywell TFE731-50BR engines for increased range. In 2012, its unit cost was US$ 16.07 million.

After the 2013 bankruptcy of Hawker Beechcraft, the surviving company, Beechcraft, discontinued its business jet range, including the 800 series.

By 2018, a 1980s-era 700s was priced for less than $500,000, a 1995 800A at $1.02 million and a 2012 900XP at $6 million.

== Design ==
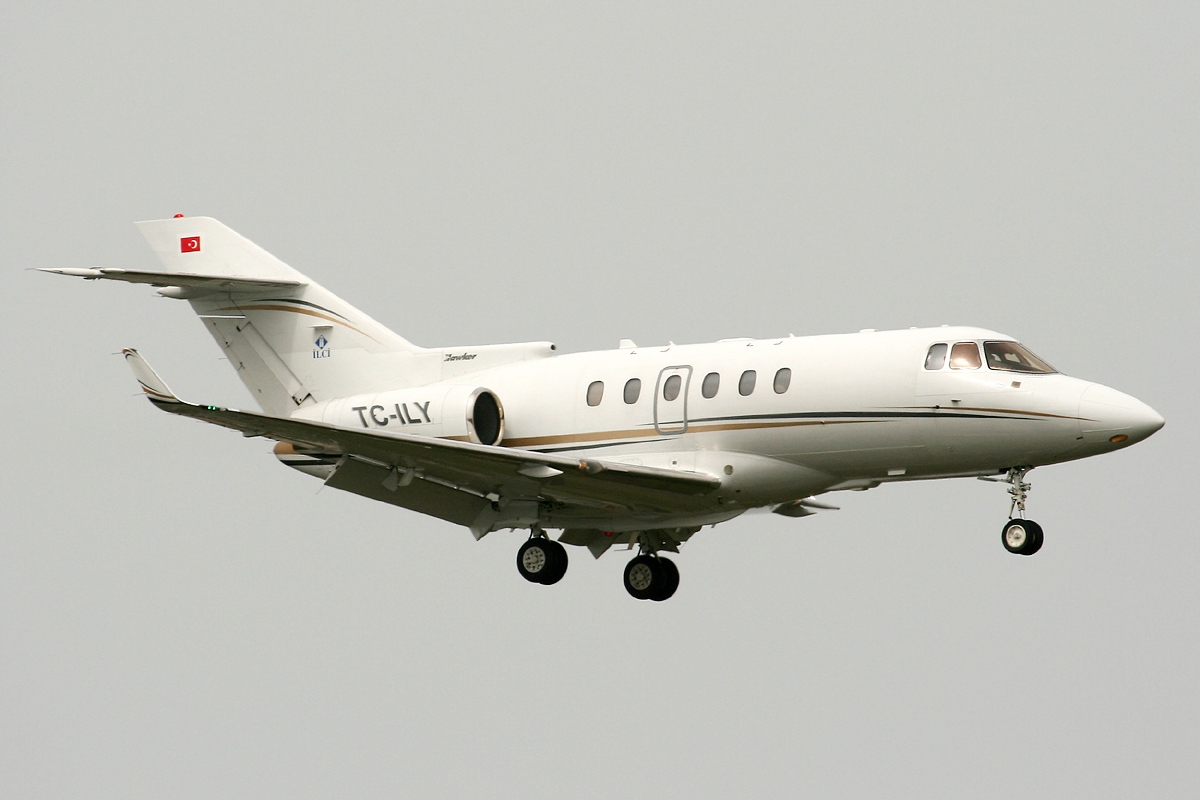
Hawker 800XP

The Hawker 800 was similar to most modern airframes in allowing sub-assemblies to be constructed away from the final point of manufacture. The fuselage sections, wings and control surfaces were manufactured and assembled in the United Kingdom in a combination of Hawker Beechcraft's own facility and those owned by Airbus UK, which inherited much of BAE Systems's civil aircraft manufacturing capacity. These sections are partially fitted out and installed with control surfacing and major systems before being shipped to Hawker Beechcraft's main manufacturing site in Wichita, Kansas for final assembly, fitting out and testing.

=== Military variants ===
Japan uses (as of 2008) a maritime search and rescue variant of the Hawker 800. It is designated U-125A in Japan Air Self-Defense Force service. This variant has large observation windows, a flare and marker-buoy dispenser system, a life-raft and emergency equipment dropping system, and enhanced salt water corrosion prevention. The aircraft also has a Toshiba 360-degree search radar, Melco thermal imaging equipment, and other military communications equipment for its mission.

A military version of the Hawker 800XP is (as of 2008) in use by South Korea for tactical aerial reconnaissance, surveillance and SIGINT (SIGnals INTelligence) tasks, and 8 specially equipped aircraft were delivered in 2000. The Republic of Korea Air Force calls them RC-800s, and they are based at Seoul Air Base.

== Variants ==
- Hawker 750

With 48 built, this lower-cost, lighter-weight and shorter-range version of the 800XP competes with the Citation XLS and Learjet 60. In November 2017, used prices range from $2.2 million for early 2008 models to 3.8 million for late 2011 models. Its larger 604 cu ft (17.1 m^{3}) cabin is typically configured with eight seats in double club or a four chair club followed by a three-place divan facing a single seat, and is pressurized by 8.5 psi (0.59 bar) to provide a 7,500 ft (2,300 m) cabin altitude at FL 410. Its 1,500 lb (680 kg) ventral fuel tank is replaced with a 47 cu ft (1.3 m^{3}) external baggage compartment, leaving 8,500 lb (3,900 kg) of fuel in the wet wings. The cockpit has four-screen Rockwell Collins Pro Line 21 avionics and FMS-6000. It takes off in 4,696 ft (1,431 m) at MTOW/Sea level. With a 20° quarter chord wing sweep, its maximum speed is Mach 0.80, it cruises at Mach 0.74 to 0.78 and long-range cruise is Mach 0.70 at 1,214 lb (551 kg) per hour midweight. First hour fuel burn is 1,900 lb (860 kg), second hour is 1,350 and 1,200 lb (610 and 540 kg) for subsequent hours. B-checks are every 800 h, C-checks every 1,600 h and D-checks every 3,200 h and there are yearly maintenance checks. The landing gear is overhauled every 12 years. Its 4,750 lbf (21.1 kN) Honeywell TFE731-5BR have 2,100 h MPI and 4,200 h CZI inspection intervals, extendable to 2,500 h / 5,000 h with optional service bulletins, and MSP per engine.

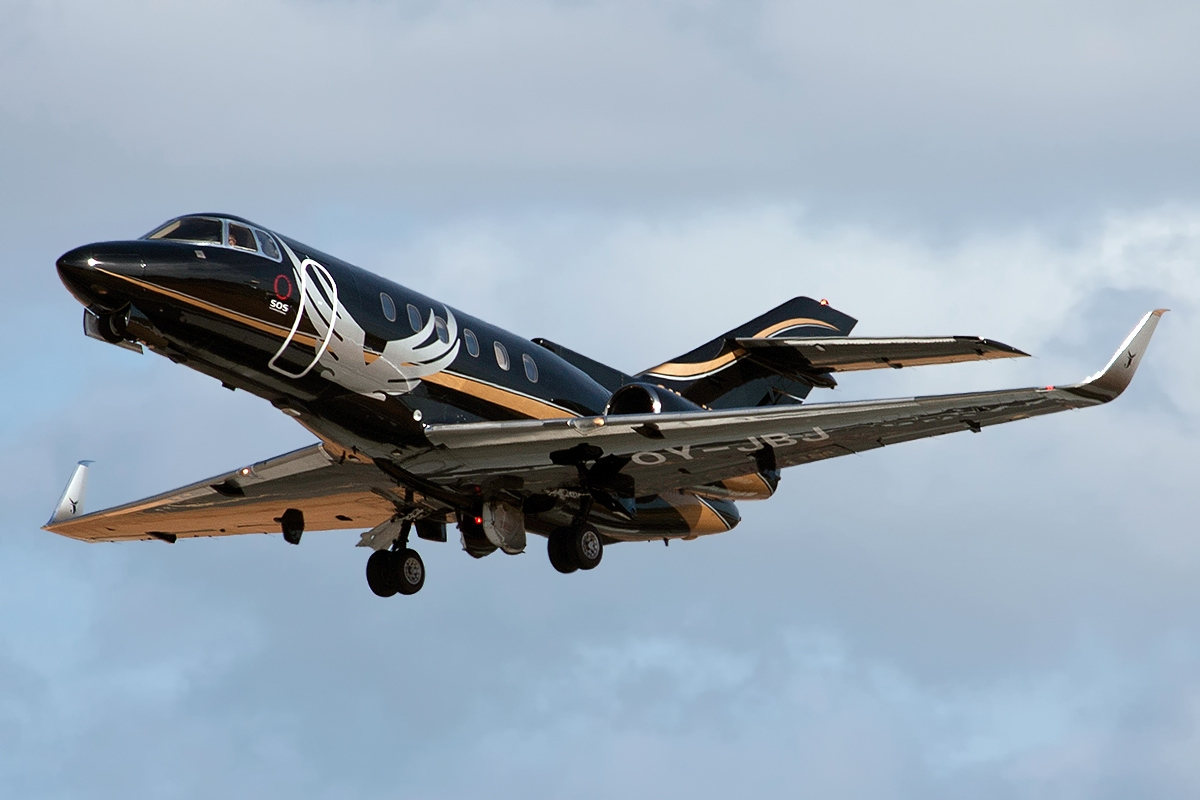
A Hawker 800 operated by Sun-Air of Scandinavia (2014)

- Hawker 800
- Hawker 800XP

Able to fly nine passengers over 2,400 nmi, 475 Hawker 800XP have been sold for $10–13.5 million between 1995 and 2005.

- Hawker 800XP Pro Line
- Hawker 800XPi
- Hawker 850XP
- Hawker 900XP
- U-125
- RC-800
- C-29

== Operators ==
=== Civil operators ===
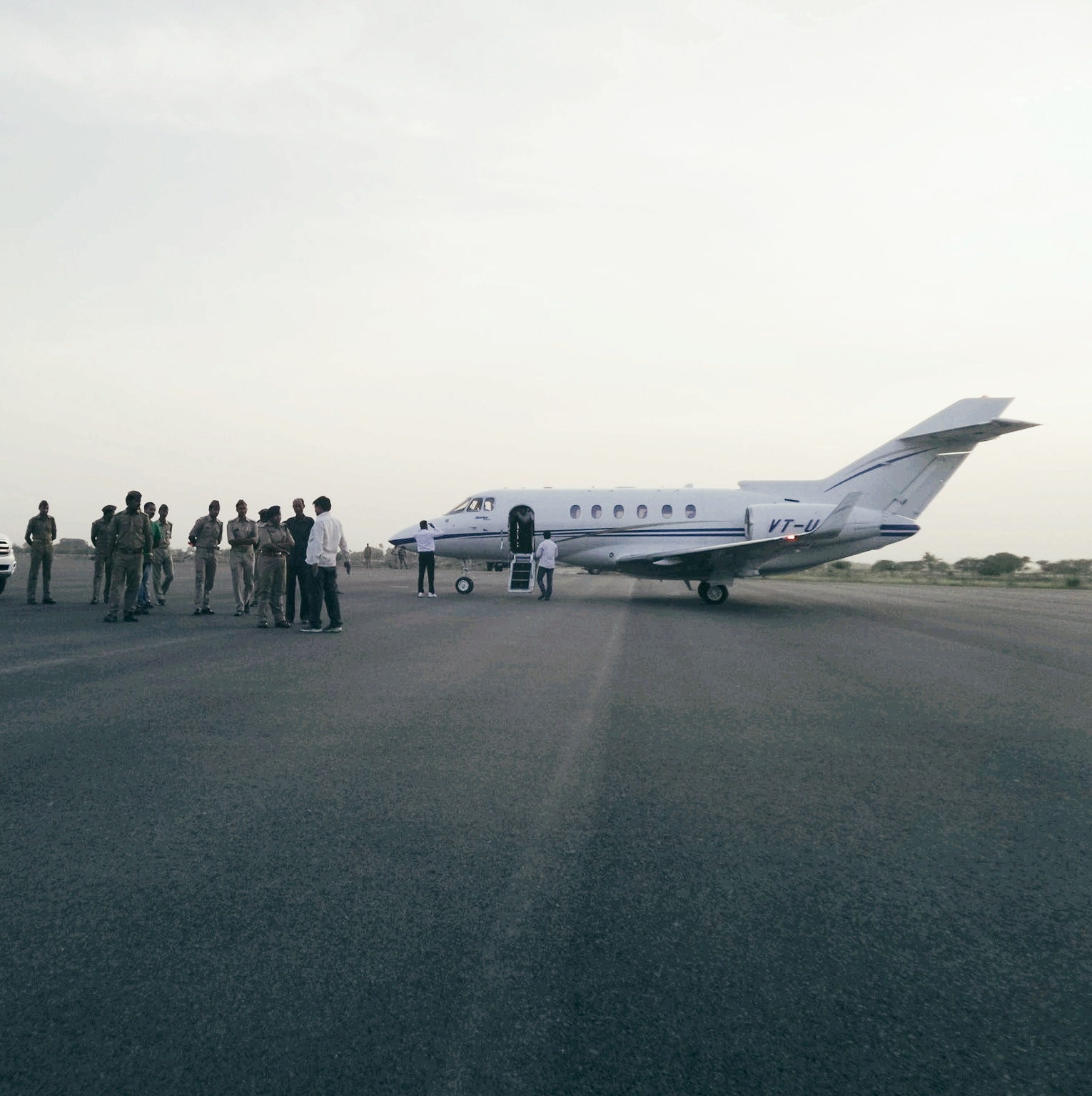
Uttar Pradesh Government is one of the government operators of Hawker 900XP

The aircraft is operated by private individuals, companies and executive charter operators, and in fractional ownership programs.

=== Military operators ===
Japan

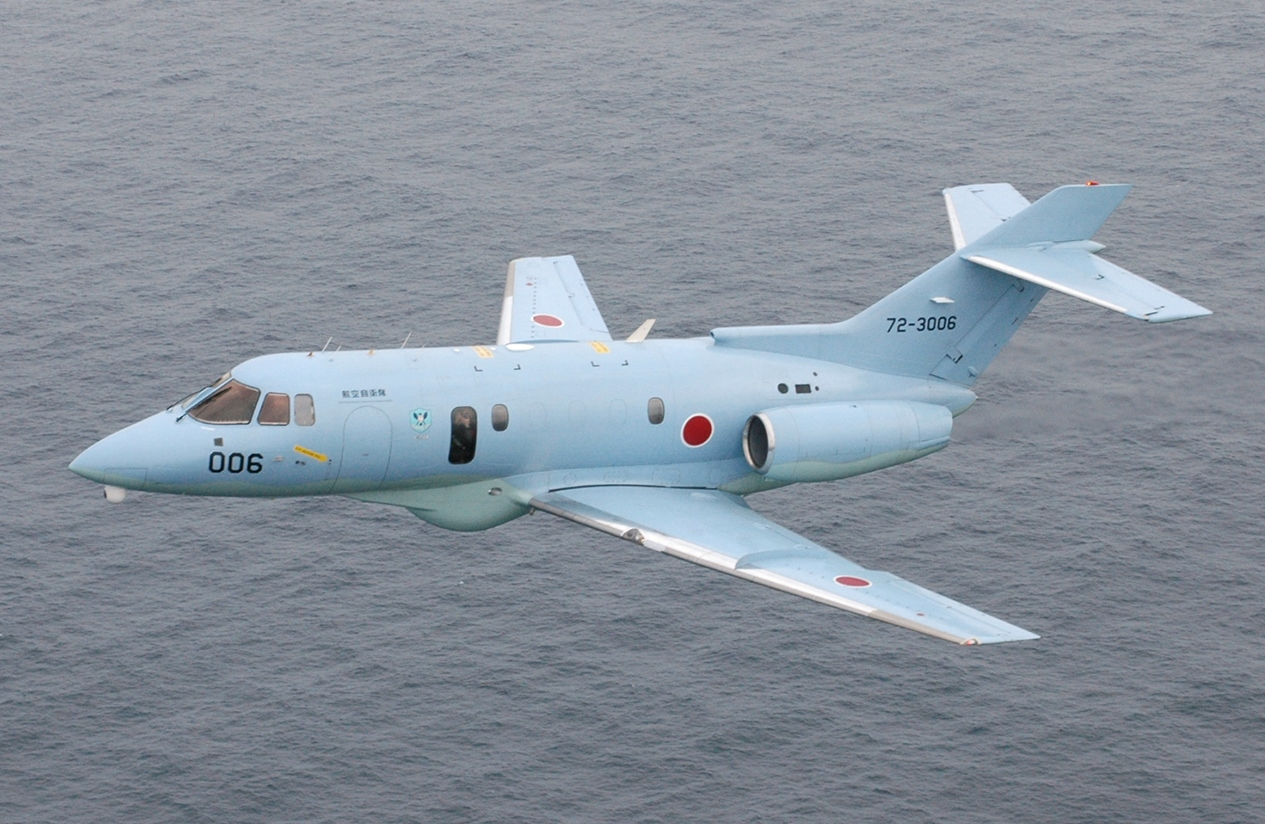
Japan Air Self-Defense Force U-125A in flight

- Japan Air Self-Defense Force

Mozambique

- Mozambique Air Force

Nigeria

- Nigerian Air Force

Pakistan

- Pakistan Navy

Philippines

- Philippine Air Force

South Korea

- Republic of Korea Air Force

== Accidents and incidents ==
- 31 July 2008: A Hawker 800 registered as N818MV and operating as East Coast Jets Flight 81, crashed while attempting a go-around at Owatonna Degner Regional Airport near Owatonna, Minnesota, killing all eight passengers and crew on board. The aircraft was manufactured in 1991, and East Coast Jets began operating it in June 2003. The NTSB determined the probable cause of the accident was the captain’s decision to attempt a go-around late in the landing roll with insufficient runway remaining. Contributing to the accident were (1) the pilots’ poor crew coordination and lack of cockpit discipline; (2) fatigue, which likely impaired both pilots’ performance; and (3) the failure of the FAA to require crew resource management training and standard operating procedures for Part 135 operators.
- 10 November 2015: A Hawker 800 operating as ExecuFlight Flight 1526 crashed into an apartment complex in Akron, Ohio shortly before 15:00 EST in rainy weather while on approach to Akron Fulton International Airport. Witnesses reported hearing a loud explosion, and seeing smoke/flames as the crash occurred. All nine occupants of the aircraft, including both pilots, were killed. The National Transportation Safety Board reported the crash was caused by pilot error, operational issues within the charter company, and deficiencies in the FAA's oversight (operations inspections) of the charter operator.
- 20 December 2020: A Hawker 800XP crashed near Farmingdale, New York at 8:35 p.m. EST. The captain sustained minor injuries, the first officer was seriously injured and the aircraft incurred substantial damage. The plane was a Part 91 business flight operated by Talon Air, LLC as a Title 14 CFR.
- 21 February 2022: A Hawker 800XP skidded off Runway 33 at Aspen-Pitkin County Airport (ASE) due to aborted takeoff due to lack of control pressure. Four passengers and two pilots were not injured.
- 7 February 2024: A Hawker 900XP crashed in Grand County, Utah near the Utah-Colorado border after takeoff from Grand Junction Regional Airport. The two pilots were killed. The aircraft was owned by Vici Aviation LLC and operated by Clay Lacy Aviation.
- October 16, 2025: A Hawker 800 crashed in the Rose Lake State Wildlife Research Area, outside of Lansing, Michigan, killing all three on board. The aircraft had received some maintenance work at Kellogg Field in Battle Creek, Michigan, and was reportedly undergoing testing when it crashed.

== Specifications (Hawker 800) ==
Data from Jane's All the World's Aircraft 1995-96

General characteristics

- Crew: 2 + jump seat
- Capacity: 8 / 2,000 lb (907 kg) maximum payload
- Length: 51 ft 2 in (15.60 m)
- Wingspan: 51 ft 4.5 in (15.659 m)
- Height: 17 ft 7 in (5.36 m)
- Wing area: 374 sq ft (34.7 m^{2})
- Empty weight: 15,600 lb (7,076 kg) basic
- Operating weight empty: 16,000 lb (7,257 kg)
- Maximum ramp weight: 27,520 lb (12,483 kg)
- Maximum zero-fuel weight: 18,000 lb (8,165 kg)
- Max takeoff weight: 27,400 lb (12,428 kg) * Maximum landing weight: 23,350 lb (10,591 kg)
- Fuel capacity: 1,248 imp gal (1,499 US gal; 5,674 L) total; 1,060 imp gal (1,273 US gal; 4,819 L) in wing integral tanks + 188 imp gal (226 US gal; 855 L) in rear under-fuselage tank
- Powerplant: 2 × Honeywell TFE731-5BR turbofan engines, 4,300 lbf (19 kN) thrust each

Performance

- Maximum speed: 456 kn (525 mph, 845 km/h) max level speed and max cruising speed at 29,000 ft (8,839 m) / M0.87
- Cruise speed: 400 kn (460 mph, 740 km/h) economical cruise at 39,000–43,000 ft (11,887–13,106 m)
- Stall speed: 92 kn (106 mph, 170 km/h) in landing configuration at typical landing weight
- Range: 2,580 nmi (2,970 mi, 4,780 km) with max payload

2,825 nmi (3,251 mi; 5,232 km) with max fuel and NBAA VFR reserves

- Service ceiling: 43,000 ft (13,000 m)
- Rate of climb: 3,100 ft/min (16 m/s)
- Wing loading: 73.26 lb/sq ft (357.7 kg/m^{2})
- Thrust/weight: 0.313
- Take-off balanced field length: 5,620 ft (1,713 m) at MTOW
- Landing distance from 50 ft (15 m): 4,500 ft (1,372 m) at typical landing weight and 6 pax

Avionics

- Standard Honeywell SPZ-800
- Dual RCZ-850 integrated comms
- Motorola N1335BSelcal
- Primus 870 weather radar

== See also ==
Related development

- BAe 125/Hawker 1000

Aircraft of comparable role, configuration, and era

- Cessna Citation Sovereign
- Dassault Falcon 20
- Gulfstream G100
- Learjet 60

Related lists

- List of civil aircraft
