= 41st Flight Training Squadron (JASDF) =

- 第41教育飛行隊
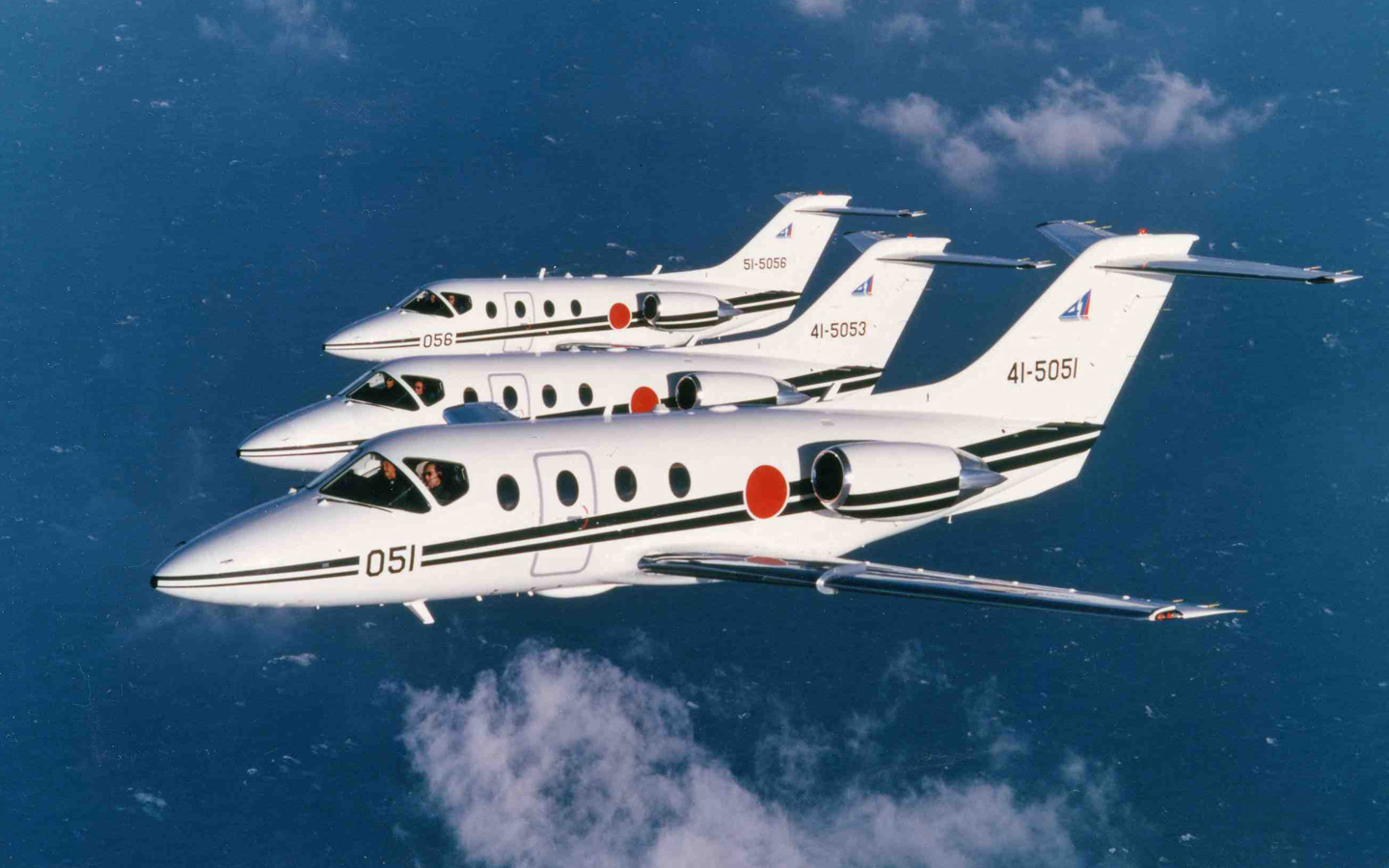
- T-400s of 41st Squadron
- Active: June 1, 1994
- Country: Japan
- Allegiance: 3rd Tactical Airlift Group
- Branch: Japan Air Self-Defense Force
- Garrison/HQ: Miho Air Base

Aircraft flown
- Trainer: T-400

The 第41教育飛行隊 (41st Flight Training Squadron, dai41kyouikuhikoutai) is a training squadron of the 3rd Tactical Airlift Group of the Japan Air Self-Defense Force (JASDF) based at Miho Air Base in Tottori Prefecture, Japan. It is equipped with 13 T-400 aircraft. The squadron trains JASDF pilots who will go on to fly large jet aircraft like the Kawasaki C-1, Kawasaki C-2, KC-767 and E-767.

As of 2017 there are plans to move the squadron to Hamamatsu Air Base in Shizuoka Prefecture.

== Tail markings ==
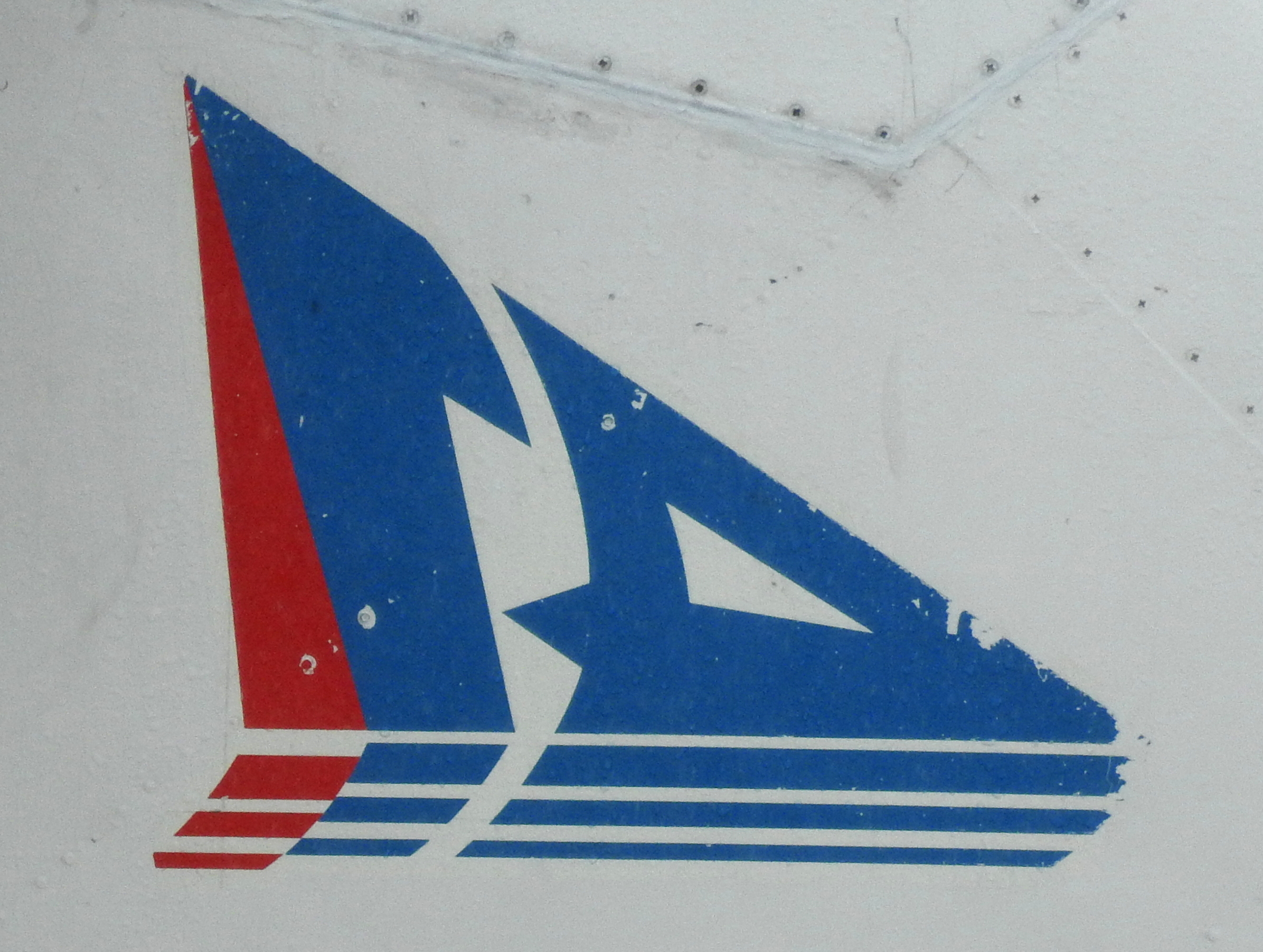
Tail marking (2017)

The squadron's aircraft bear a stylized "41" as their tail marking.

== Aircraft operated ==
- T-400 (1994–present)
