= 2nd Tactical Airlift Group (JASDF) =

- 第2輸送航空隊
- Active: October 17, 1958
- Country: Japan
- Branch: Japan Air Self-Defense Force
- Garrison/HQ: Iruma Air Base

Aircraft flown
- Transport: Kawasaki C-1, Kawasaki C-2, U-4

2nd Tactical Airlift Group (第2輸送航空隊, dai-ni-kusoukoukuutai) is a group of the Japan Air Self-Defense Force. It consists of the 402nd Tactical Airlift Squadron, based at Iruma Air Base in Saitama Prefecture. It is sometimes referred to as the 2nd Tactical Airlift Wing.
