= 3rd Tactical Airlift Group (JASDF) =

- 第3輸送航空隊
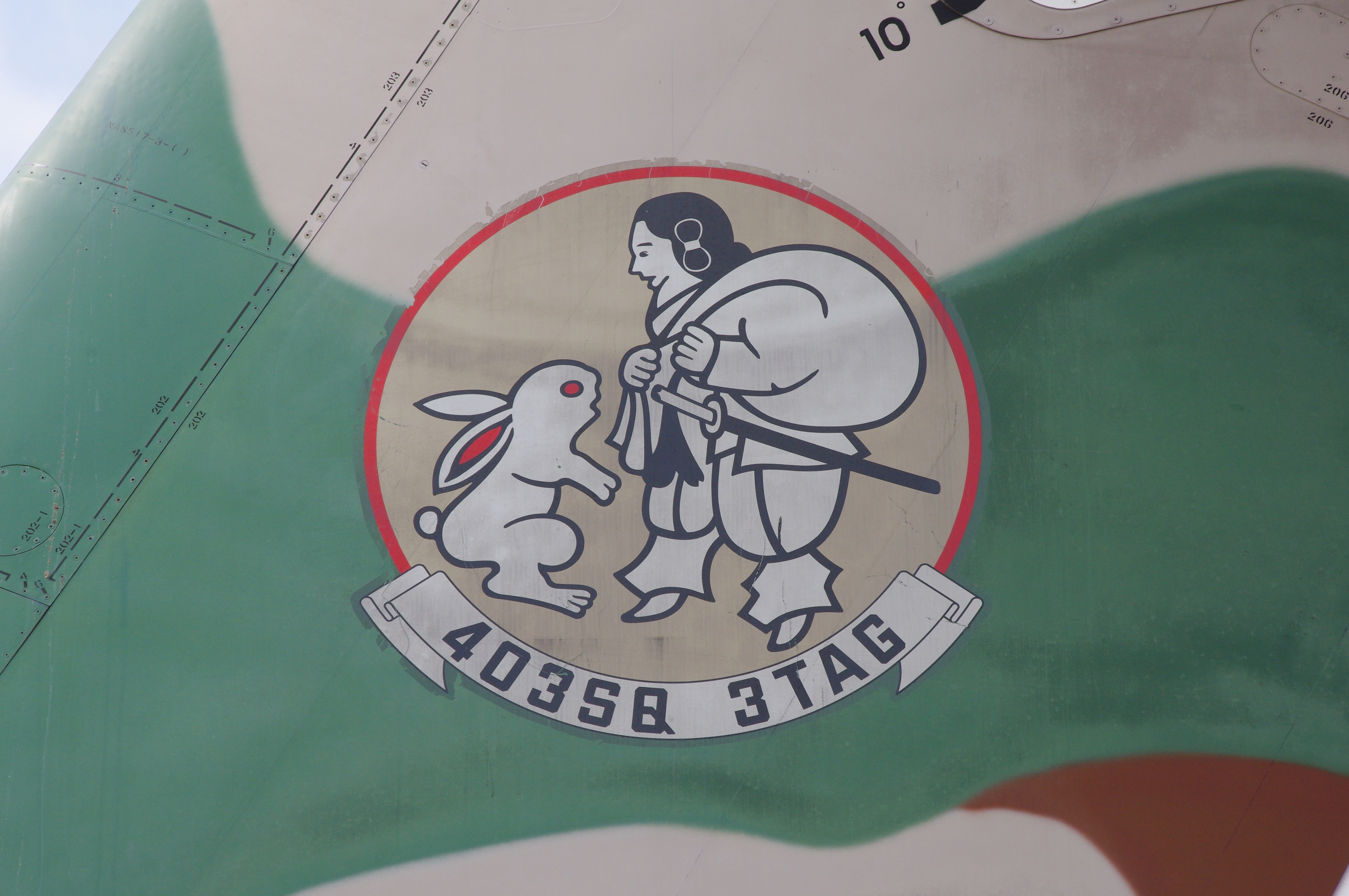
- 403rd Tactical Airlift Squadron tail marking
- Active: March 31, 1978
- Country: Japan
- Branch: Japan Air Self-Defense Force
- Garrison/HQ: Miho Air Base

Aircraft flown
- Trainer: T-400
- Transport: Kawasaki C-1, Kawasaki C-2

3rd Tactical Airlift Group (第3輸送航空隊, dai-san-kusoukoukuutai) is a group of the Japan Air Self-Defense Force based at Miho Air Base in Tottori Prefecture. It is sometimes referred to as the 3rd Tactical Airlift Wing.

It consists of two squadrons:

- 403rd Tactical Airlift Squadron (Kawasaki C-1 & Kawasaki C-2)
- 41st Flight Training Squadron (T-400)
