= Yonago Kitaro Airport =

Miho Airbase 美保飛行場
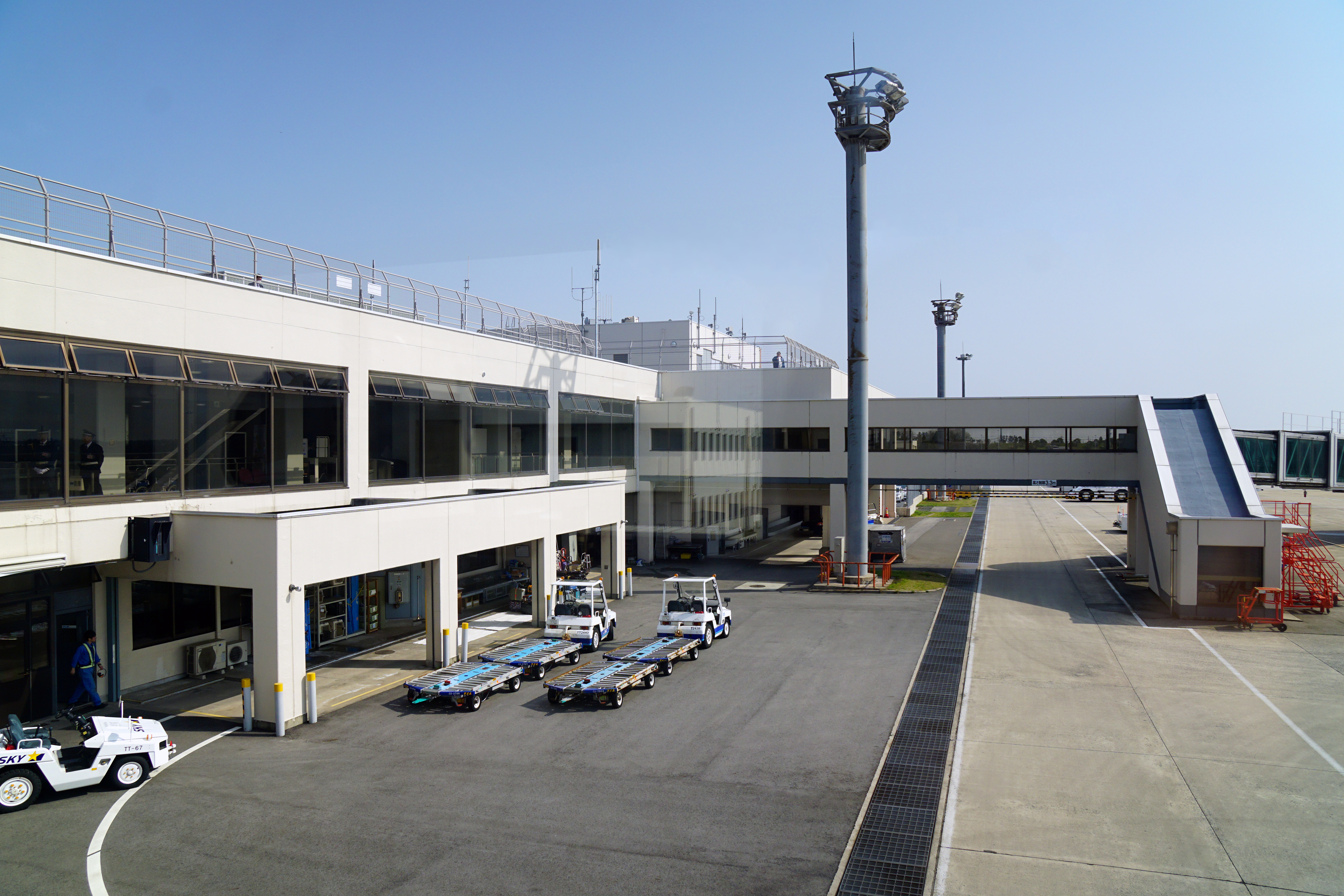
- IATA: YGJ; ICAO: RJOH

Summary
- Airport type: Public / Military
- Operator: JASDF
- Serves: Yonago, Tottori, Japan
- Elevation AMSL: 13 ft (4.0 m)
- Coordinates: 35°29′36″N 133°14′21″E

Map
- Location in Tottori Prefecture Location in Japan

Runways
Direction	Length		Surface
Direction	m	ft	Surface
07/25	2,500	8,202	Asphalt concrete

Statistics (2015)
- Passengers: 666,445
- Cargo (metric tonnes): 1,677
- Aircraft movement: 6,715
- Source: Japanese Ministry of Land, Infrastructure, Transport and Tourism

Miho Airbase (Note: Japanese: 美保飛行場, Hepburn: Miho Hikōjō) (IATA: YGJ, ICAO: RJOH), and Yonago Airport (Note: Japanese: 米子空港, Hepburn: Yonago Kūkō) also branded as Yonago Kitaro Airport (Note: Japanese: 米子鬼太郎空港, Hepburn: Yonago Kitaro Kūkō), is a Japan Air Defense Force (JASDF) base located 11 km northwest of Yonago in Tottori Prefecture. It is owned and operated by JASDF and shares the runway with civil activities.

== History ==
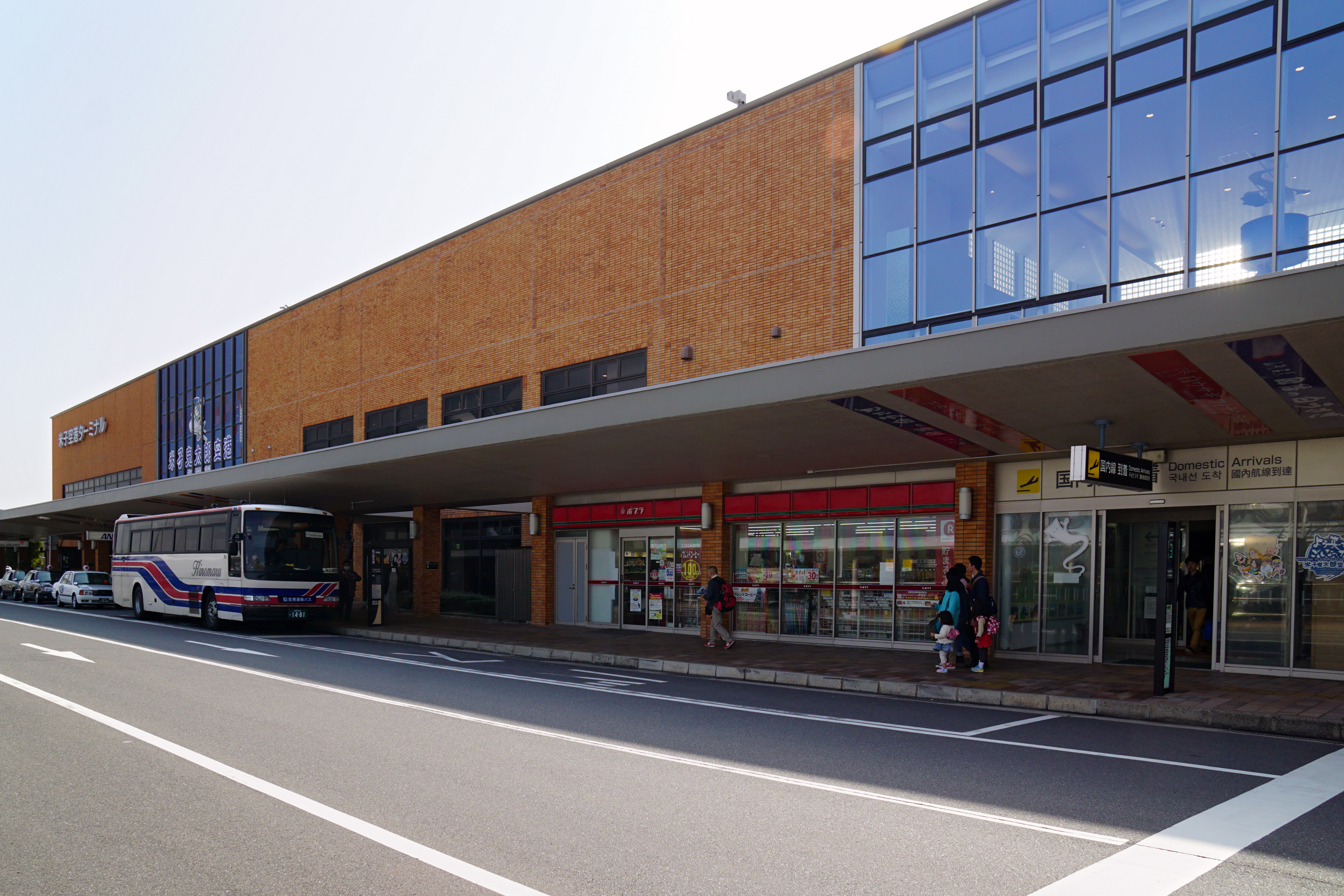
Yonago Airport Entrance

The airport was built as an Imperial Japanese Army Air Force airfield during World War II, and was attacked by USAAF B-24 Liberator bombers during July 1945. After the war, the airfield was taken over by the British Commonwealth Occupation Force (BCOF) in Japan. The Royal Australian Air Force No. 5 Airfield Construction Squadron refurbished the airfield, and No. 77 Squadron was stationed at the airfield until 1950.

In December 1950, the United States Air Force 452d Bombardment Wing moved B-26 Invader light bombers to Miho Air Base. They moved to Pusan East (K-9) Air Base, South Korea in May 1951 for combat duty during the Korean War. The only other operational USAF unit to use the airfield was the 17th Bombardment Wing, which also flew B-26s from the field between October 1954 and March 1955 before returning to the United States.

Miho Air Base was used primarily as a radar station by the 618th Aircraft Control and Warning Squadron beginning in December 1950, operating defensive radar sites as part of the air defense of Japan until May 1957. The 6135th Support Squadron maintained airfield facilities and a small ground station. The Air Weather Service 15th Weather Squadron also used the airfield, along with transient C-47 Skytrain transports carrying supplies and personnel. USAF units were withdrawn and Miho Air Base was returned to Japanese control in May 1957 as part of a general drawdown of American forces in Japan.

== Present ==
=== JASDF ===
The Japan Air Self Defense Force has operated a number of transports at Miho Air Base including Curtiss C-46 Commando and NAMC YS-11 aircraft.

During 23–25 October 2015, a British Royal Air Force (RAF) A400M Atlas transport aircraft visited Miho Air Base. It was the first time for an RAF aircraft to land at a JASDF base.

On March 29, 2018, a UH-1J of the Japan Ground Self-Defense Force made an emergency landing at the base after an emergency light flashed. No one was injured. The helicopter had been on the way from its base at Nihonbara in Okayama Prefecture to fight a fire in the mountains of Shimane Prefecture.

==== Tenant squadrons ====
- Third Tactical Airlift Group
  - 403rd Tactical Airlift Squadron (JASDF) (Kawasaki C-2).
  - 41st Flight Training Squadron (T-400)

=== Japan Coast Guard ===
The Japan Coast Guard established an air station at Miho in 1978 and has operated Bell 212, Bell 412 (1996) and AgustaWestland AW139 (2009) helicopters and Bombardier DHC-8 (2011) fixed-wing aircraft there.

=== Civil use ===
A passenger terminal was built at the airport in 1956 and scheduled service to Osaka International Airport began in 1958, followed by Tokyo Haneda Airport in 1964. The airport has also at various times had service to Nagoya (Chubu and Komaki), Sapporo (New Chitose), Kansai International Airport, Fukuoka and Oki.

A runway extension and terminal renovation were completed in 1996, and international service to Incheon International Airport (Seoul) began in 2001.

In summer 2013, the airport accommodated charter flights from Hong Kong on Hong Kong Airlines, bringing tourists to the surrounding San'in region as well as Osaka and Hiroshima. The flights reached load factors of 86.8% and were scheduled to resume in the winter tourist season.

Skymark Airlines began service from Yonago to Narita and Kobe in December 2013, and has announced that it will begin service from Yonago to Haneda, Sapporo and Okinawa beginning in April 2014. However Skymark exits Yonago in 2015 due to bankruptcy.

== Airlines and destinations ==
Airlines	Destinations
Air Seoul	Seoul–Incheon
All Nippon Airways	Tokyo–Haneda
ANA Wings	Tokyo–Haneda
Tigerair Taiwan	Taipei–Taoyuan

== Access ==
The airport is connected to various locations by bus. There is also a railway line, the Sakai Line, in the vicinity, which connects the airport with the Yonago Station and Sakaiminato Station.
