= 402nd Tactical Airlift Squadron (JASDF) =

- 第402飛行隊
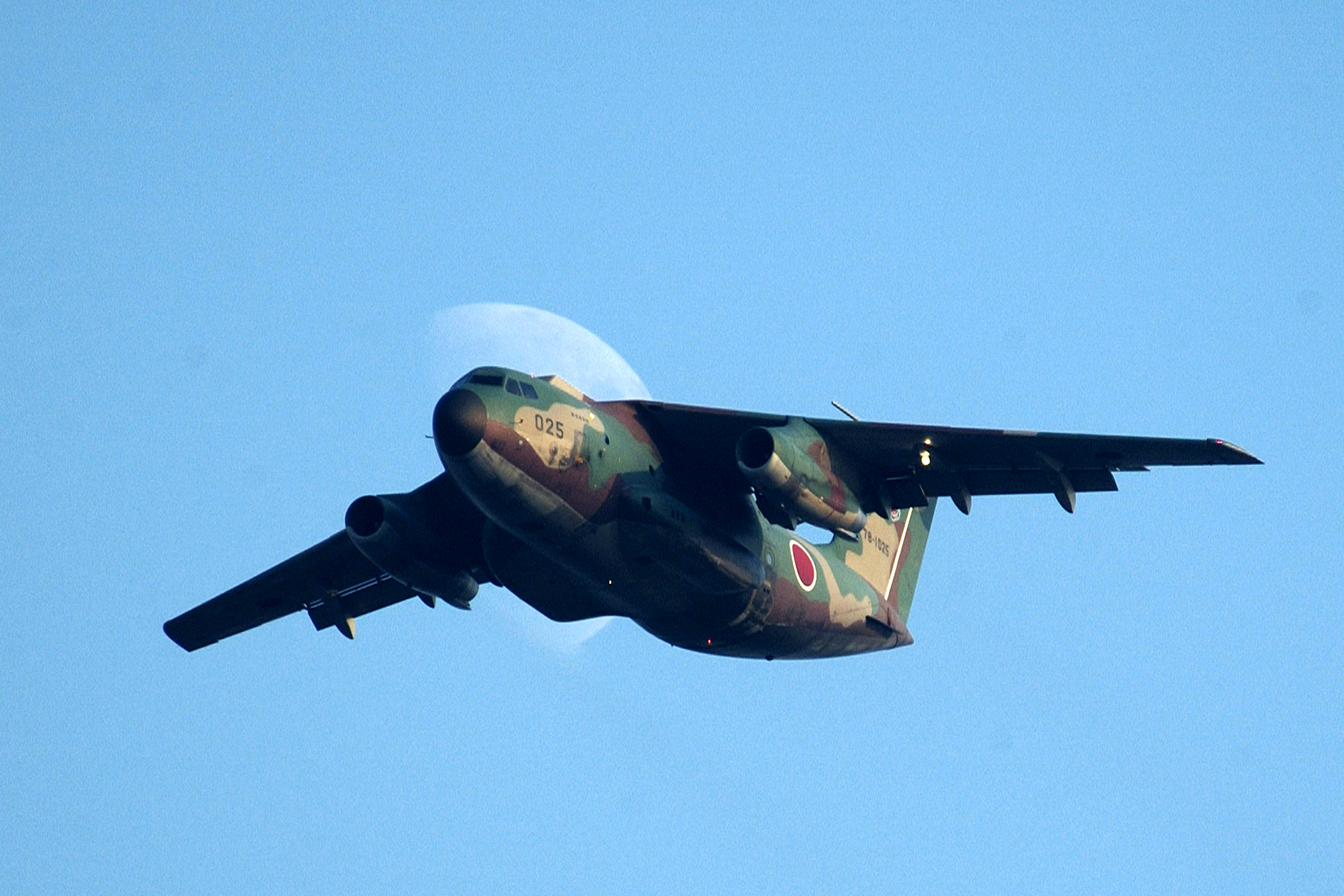
- 402nd Squadron Kawasaki C-1
- Active: October 17, 1958
- Country: Japan
- Allegiance: 2nd Tactical Airlift Group
- Branch: Japan Air Self-Defense Force
- Garrison/HQ: Iruma Air Base

Aircraft flown
- Transport: Kawasaki C-1, Kawasaki C-2, U-4

The 第402飛行隊 (402nd Tactical Airlift Squadron, dai402hikoutai) is the sole squadron of the 2nd Tactical Airlift Group of the Japan Air Self-Defense Force based at Iruma Air Base in Saitama Prefecture, Japan. It is equipped with Kawasaki C-1 and U-4 aircraft.

== Tail marking ==
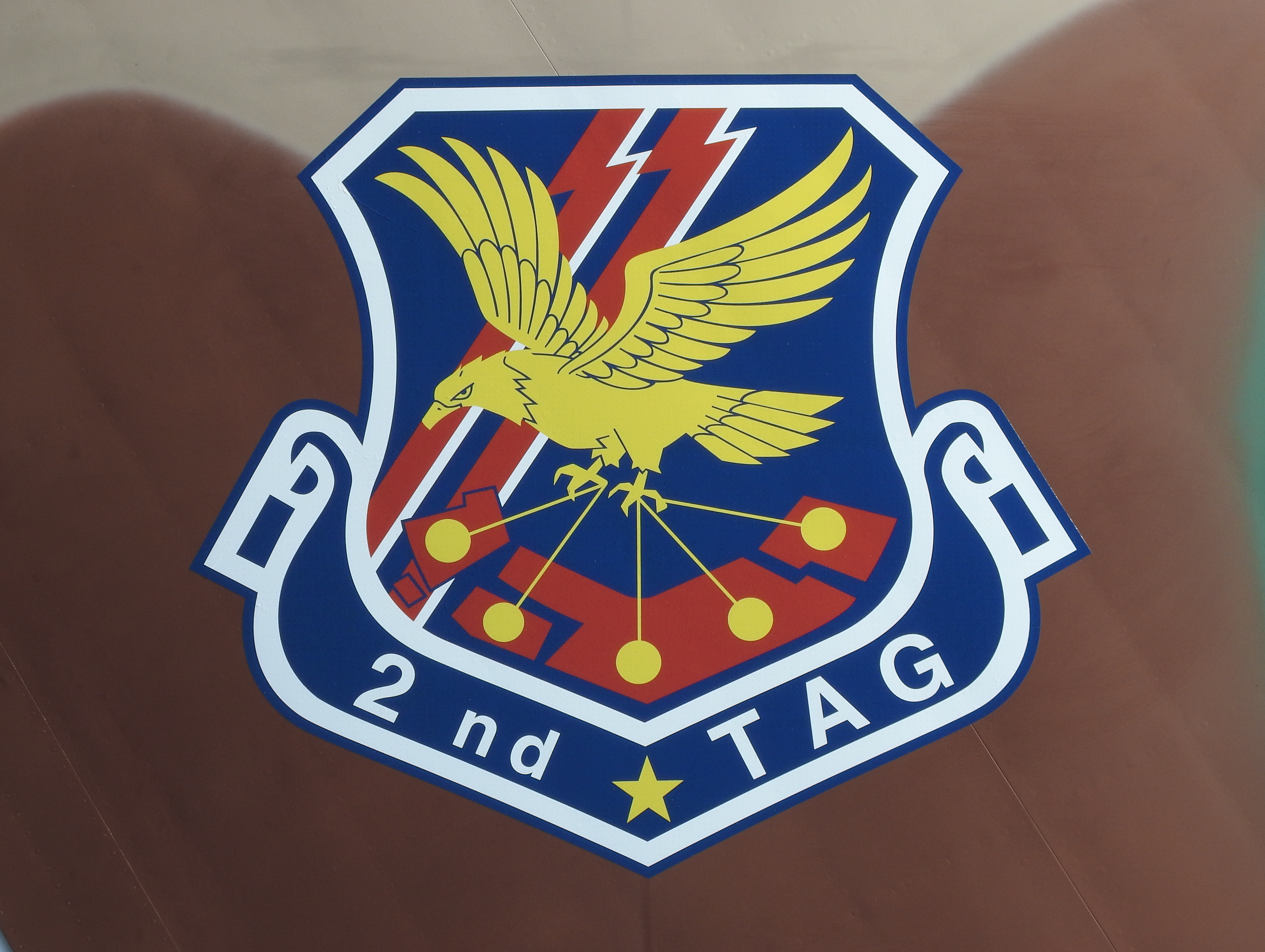
Tail marking (2016)

The squadron's tail marking is the emblem of the 2nd Tactical Airlift Group. The emblem shows an eagle over Japan.

== Aircraft operated ==
- Curtiss C-46 Commando (1968–1978)
- NAMC YS-11（1968–2001）
- Kawasaki C-1（1973–2025）
- U-4 (1997–present）
- Kawasaki C-2（2021–present）
