= 403rd Tactical Airlift Squadron (JASDF) =

- 第403飛行隊
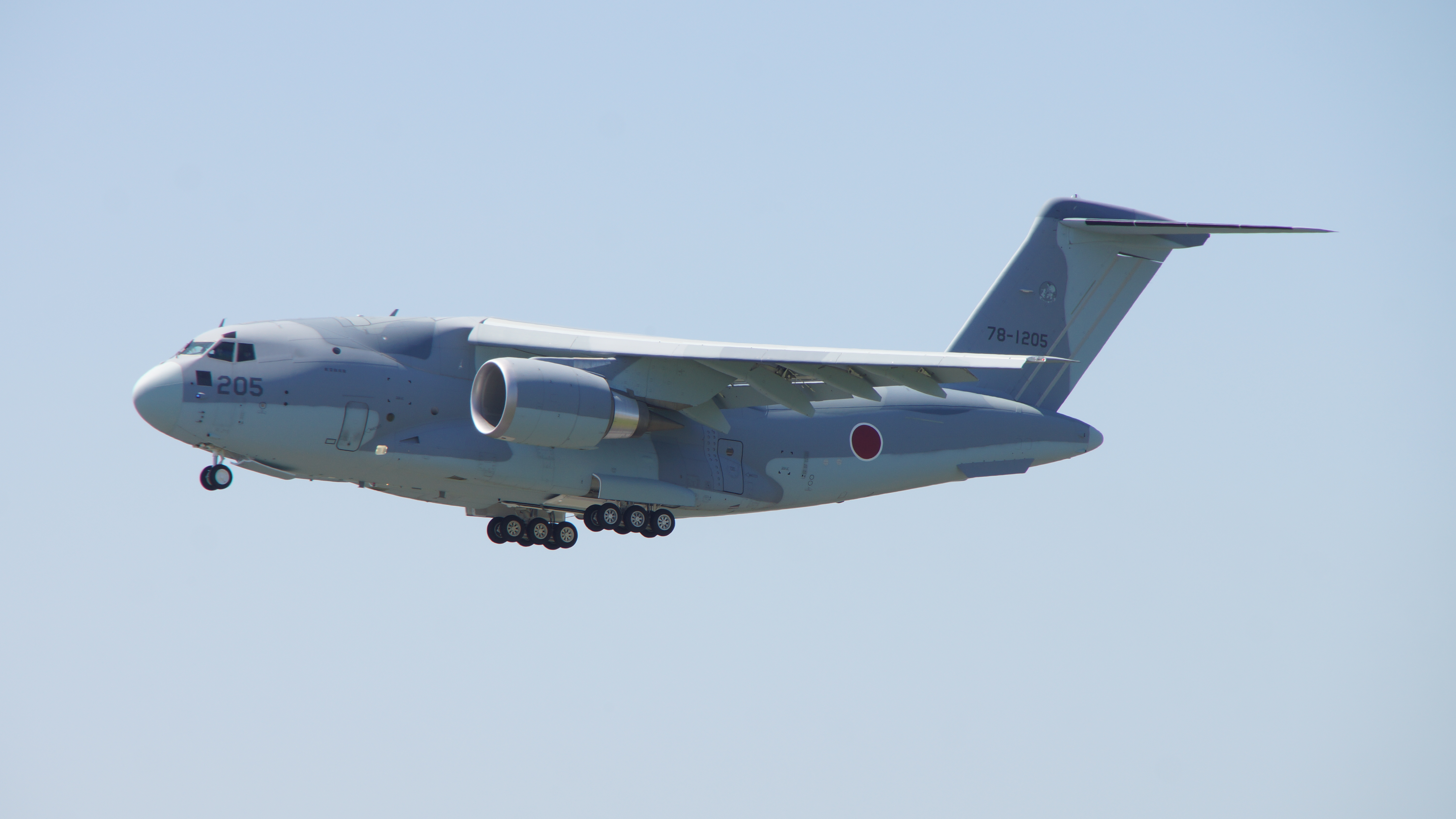
- C-2 of 403rd Squadron (2017)
- Active: March 31, 1978
- Country: Japan
- Allegiance: 3rd Tactical Airlift Group
- Branch: Japan Air Self-Defense Force
- Garrison/HQ: Miho Air Base

Aircraft flown
- Transport: Kawasaki C-1, Kawasaki C-2

The 403rd Tactical Airlift Squadron (第403飛行隊, dai-yon-zero-san-hikoutai) is the sole transport squadron of the 3rd Tactical Airlift Group of the Japan Air Self-Defense Force based at Miho Air Base in Tottori Prefecture, Japan. It is equipped with Kawasaki C-1 and Kawasaki C-2 aircraft.

== History ==
The squadron retired its last NAMC YS-11P aircraft in May 2017 after nearly 30 years of operations. YS-11P 52-1152 is exhibited in the Aichi Museum of Flight.

In November 2017 a Kawasaki C-2 of the squadron deployed to the Japan Self-Defense Force Base Djibouti in Africa for the first time.

== Tail marking ==
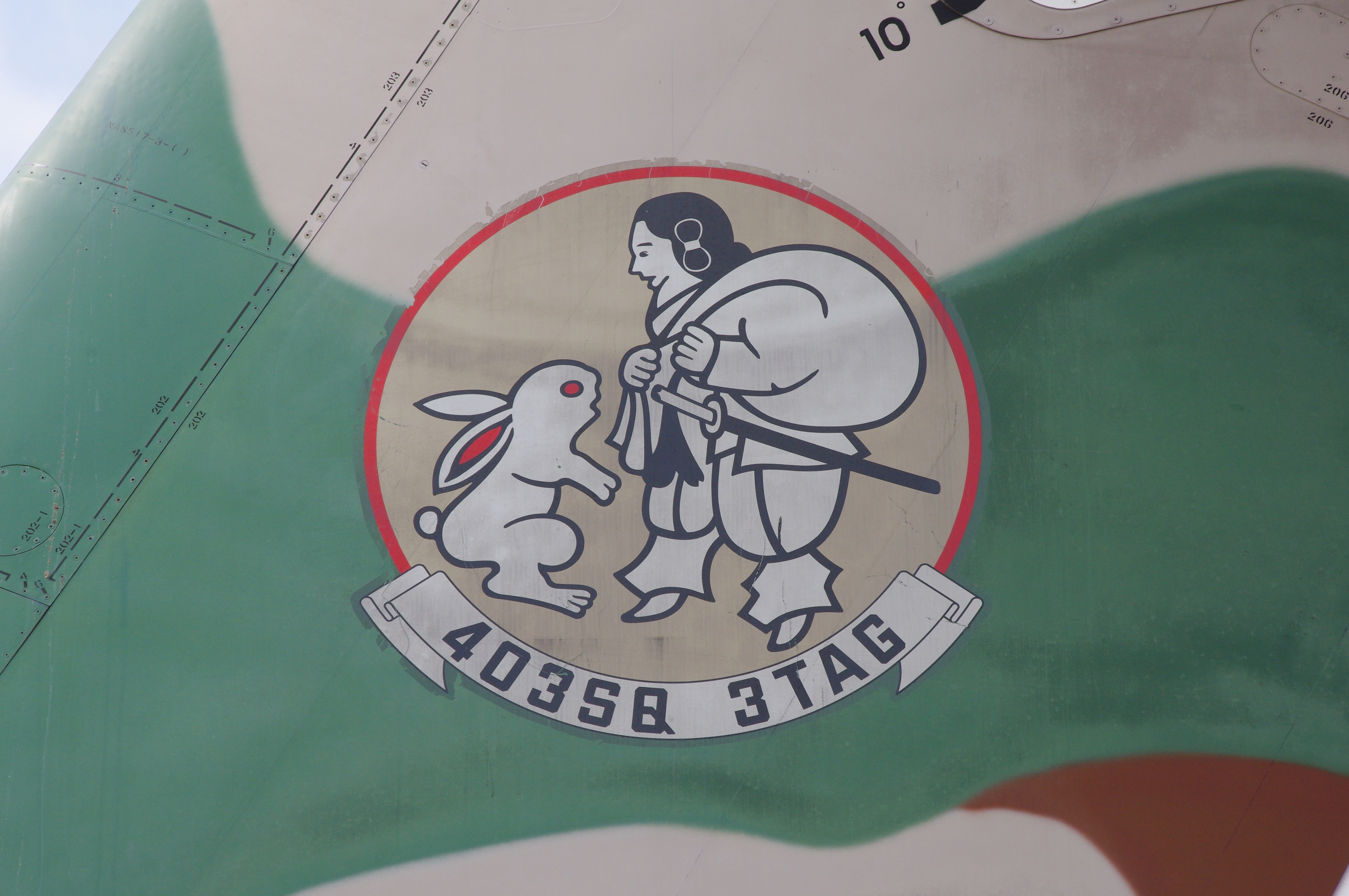
Tail marking (2012)

The squadron's tail markings show the story of the Hare of Inaba.

== Aircraft operated ==
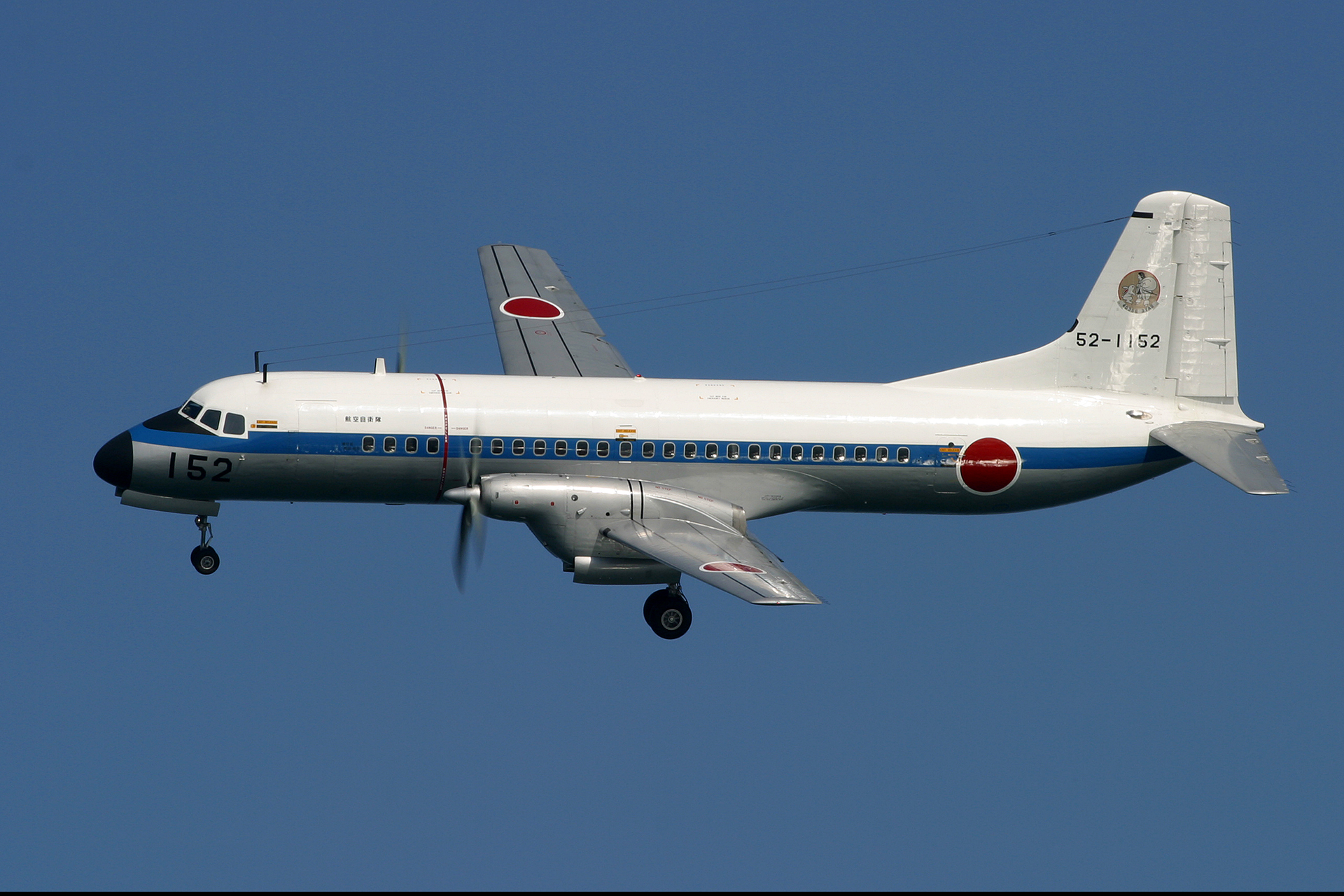
403rd Squadron NAMC YS-11P in flight

- NAMC YS-11P (1978–2017)
- Kawasaki C-1 (1979–2018)
- Kawasaki C-2 (2017–present)
