= Raytheon T-1 Jayhawk =

US military training aircraft based on Beechjet/Hawker 400A

T-1 Jayhawk / T-400
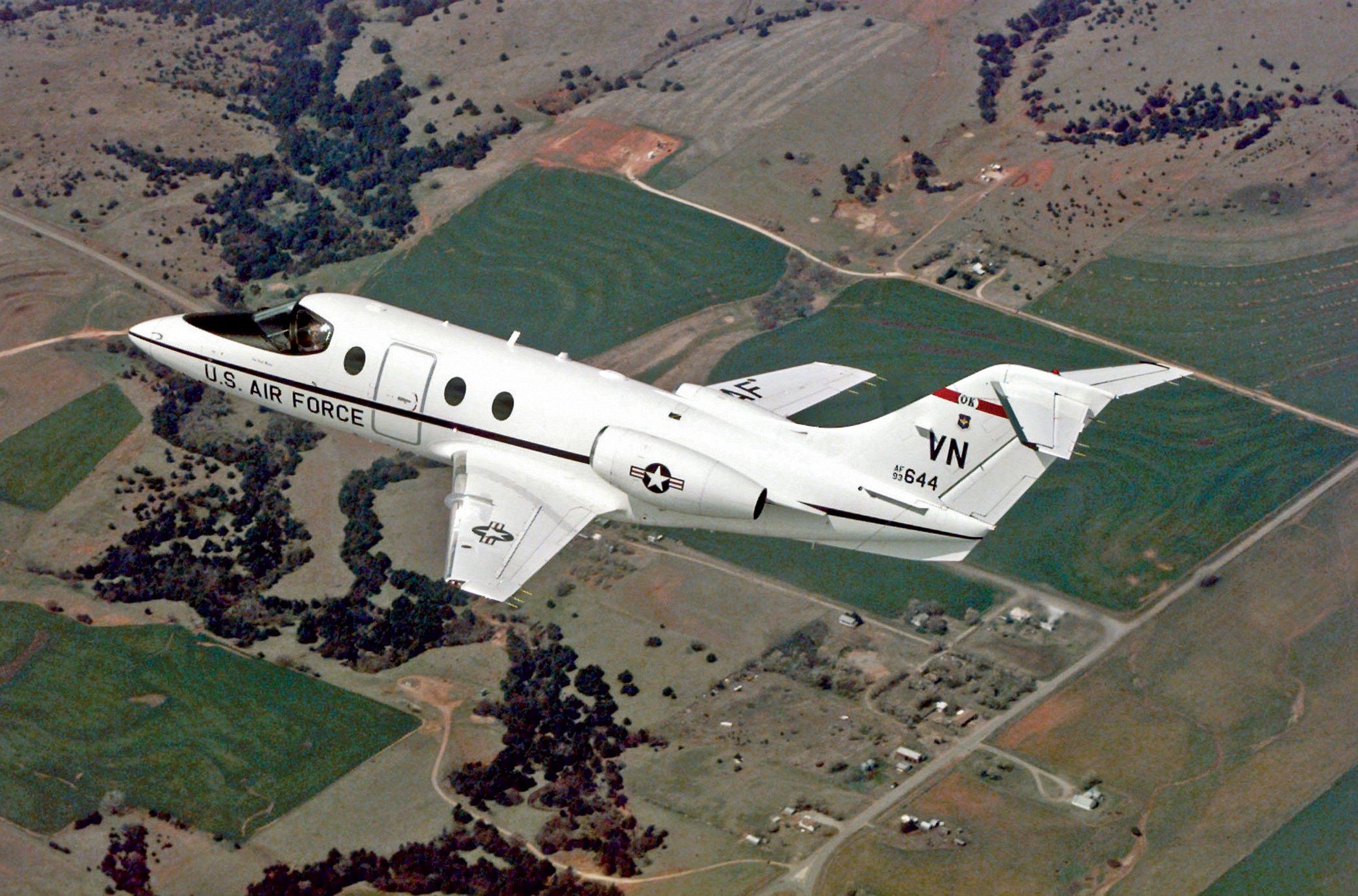

General information
- Type: Trainer aircraft
- Manufacturer: Raytheon; Hawker Beechcraft
- Status: Active service
- Primary users: United States Air Force Japan Air Self-Defense Force
- Number built: 180

History
- Manufactured: 1992–1997
- Introduction date: 17 January 1992
- First flight: 5 July 1991
- Developed from: Beechjet/Hawker 400A

The Raytheon T-1 Jayhawk is a twin-engined jet aircraft used by the United States Air Force for advanced pilot training. T-1A students go on to fly airlift and tanker aircraft. The T-400 is a similar version for the Japan Air Self-Defense Force.

== Design and development ==
The T-1A Jayhawk is a medium-range, twin-engine jet trainer used in the advanced phase of Air Force Joint Specialized Undergraduate Pilot Training for students selected to fly strategic/tactical airlift or tanker aircraft. It is used also for training Air Force Combat Systems Officers in high and low level flight procedures during the advanced phase of training. It also augmented or served in lieu of the T-39 Sabreliner in the Intermediate phase of US Navy/Marine Corps Student Naval Flight Officer training until the joint Air Force-Navy/Marine Corps training pipeline split in 2010 and now remains solely in operation with the U.S. Air Force, leaving the Navy with the Sabreliner pending its eventual replacement. The T-1 Jayhawk shares the same letter and number as the long retired T-1 SeaStar under the 1962 United States Tri-Service aircraft designation system.

The swept-wing T-1A is a military version of the Beechjet/Hawker 400A. It has cockpit seating for an instructor and two students and is powered by twin turbofan engines capable of an operating speed of Mach .78. The T-1A differs from its commercial counterpart with structural enhancements that provide for a large number of landings per flight hour, increased bird strike resistance and an additional fuselage fuel tank. A total of 180 T-1 trainers were delivered between 1992 and 1997.

The first T-1A was delivered to Reese Air Force Base, Texas, in January 1992, and student training began in 1993.

Another military variant is the Japan Air Self-Defense Force T-400 (400T) trainer, which shares the same type certificate as the T-1A.

== Variants ==
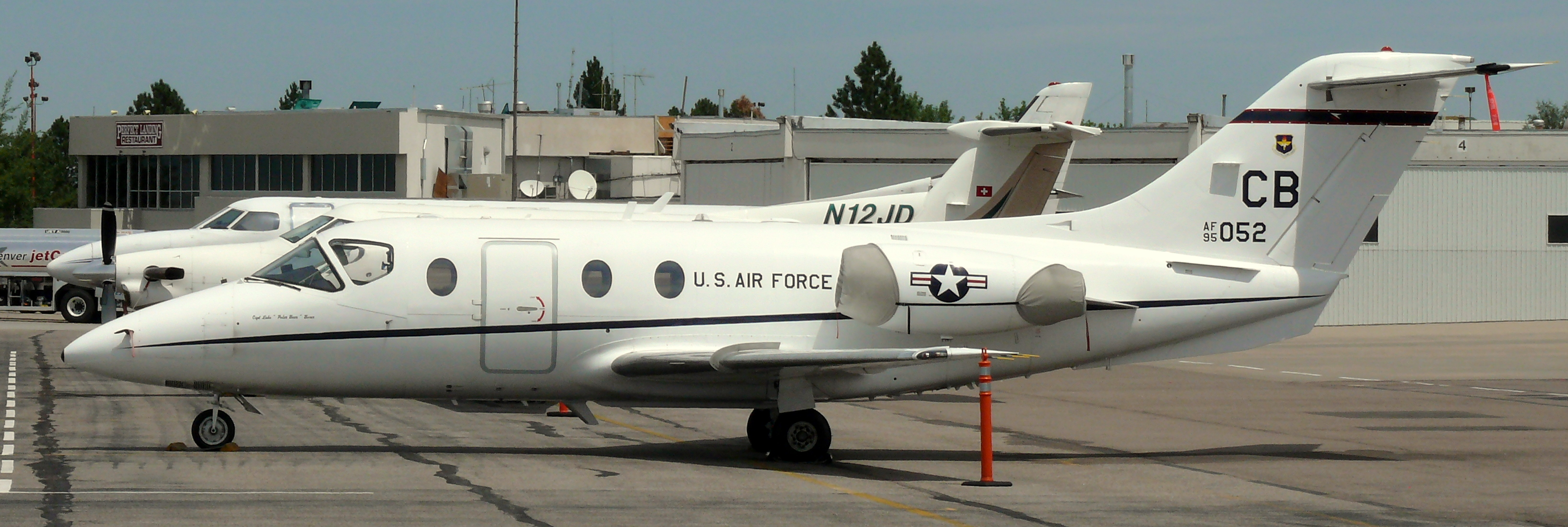
A T-1A parked at Centennial Airport (2008)

T-1A
United States military designation for trainer powered by two JT15D-5B turbofans, 180 built.
T-400
Japanese military designation for the Model 400T powered by two JT15D-5F turbofans, also known by the project name TX; 13 built.

== Operators ==
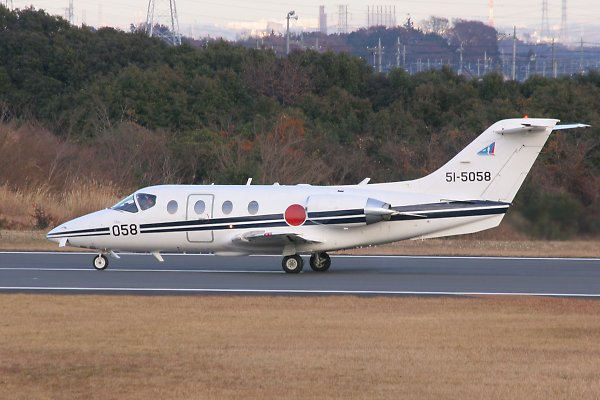
JASDF T-400 at Iruma Air Base (2005)

Japan

- Japan Air Self-Defense Force
  - 3rd Tactical Airlift Wing – Miho Air Base, Tottori
    - 41st Flight Training Squadron

United States

- United States Air Force
  - 12th Flying Training Wing – Randolph Air Force Base, Texas
    - 99th Flying Training Squadron
    - 451st Flying Training Squadron – Pensacola Naval Air Station, Florida
  - 14th Flying Training Wing – Columbus Air Force Base, Mississippi
    - 48th Flying Training Squadron
  - 47th Flying Training Wing – Laughlin Air Force Base, Texas
    - 86th Flying Training Squadron
  - 71st Flying Training Wing – Vance Air Force Base, Oklahoma
    - 3rd Flying Training Squadron
  - 340th Flying Training Group – Randolph Air Force Base, Texas
    - 5th Flying Training Squadron – Vance Air Force Base
    - 43d Flying Training Squadron – Columbus Air Force Base
    - 96th Flying Training Squadron – Laughlin Air Force Base
    - 39th Flying Training Squadron – Randolph Air Force Base

== Specifications (T-1A) ==
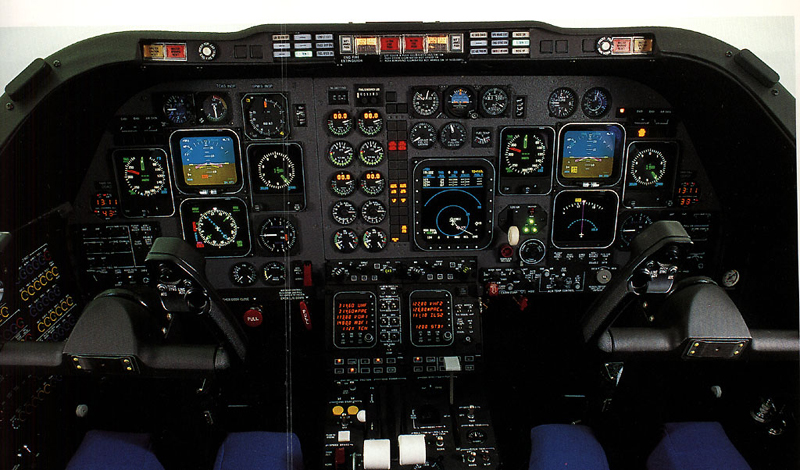
T-1A Cockpit

Data from Jane's All The World's Aircraft 1993–94

General characteristics

- Crew: 3 (pilot, co-pilot/instructor, observer)
- Capacity: 4 passengers
- Length: 48 ft 5 in (14.76 m)
- Wingspan: 43 ft 6 in (13.26 m)
- Height: 13 ft 11 in (4.24 m)
- Wing area: 241.4 sq ft (22.43 m^{2})
- Aspect ratio: 7.5:1
- Airfoil: Mitsubishi MAC510
- Empty weight: 10,450 lb (4,740 kg)
- Max takeoff weight: 16,100 lb (7,303 kg)
- Powerplant: 2 × Pratt & Whitney Canada JT15D-5B turbofan, 2,900 lbf (13 kN) thrust each

Performance

- Maximum speed: 468 kn (539 mph, 867 km/h) at 27,000 ft (8,200 m)
- Cruise speed: 392 kn (451 mph, 726 km/h) long range cruise at 41,000 ft (12,000 m)
- Stall speed: 93 kn (107 mph, 172 km/h) CAS
- Range: 2,900 nmi (3,300 mi, 5,400 km)
- Service ceiling: 41,000 ft (12,000 m)

== See also ==
Related development

- Hawker 400

Aircraft of comparable role, configuration, and era

- North American Sabreliner

Related lists

- List of active United States military aircraft

== Bibliography ==
- Jackson, Paul, ed. (2003). Jane's All the World's Aircraft 2003–2004. Coulsdon, UK: Jane's Information Group. ISBN 0-7106-2537-5.
- Lambert, Mark, ed. (1993). Jane's All The World's Aircraft 1993–94. Coulsdon, UK: Jane's Data Division. ISBN 0-7106-1066-1.
