= Kawasaki C-2 =

Japanese military transport aircraft

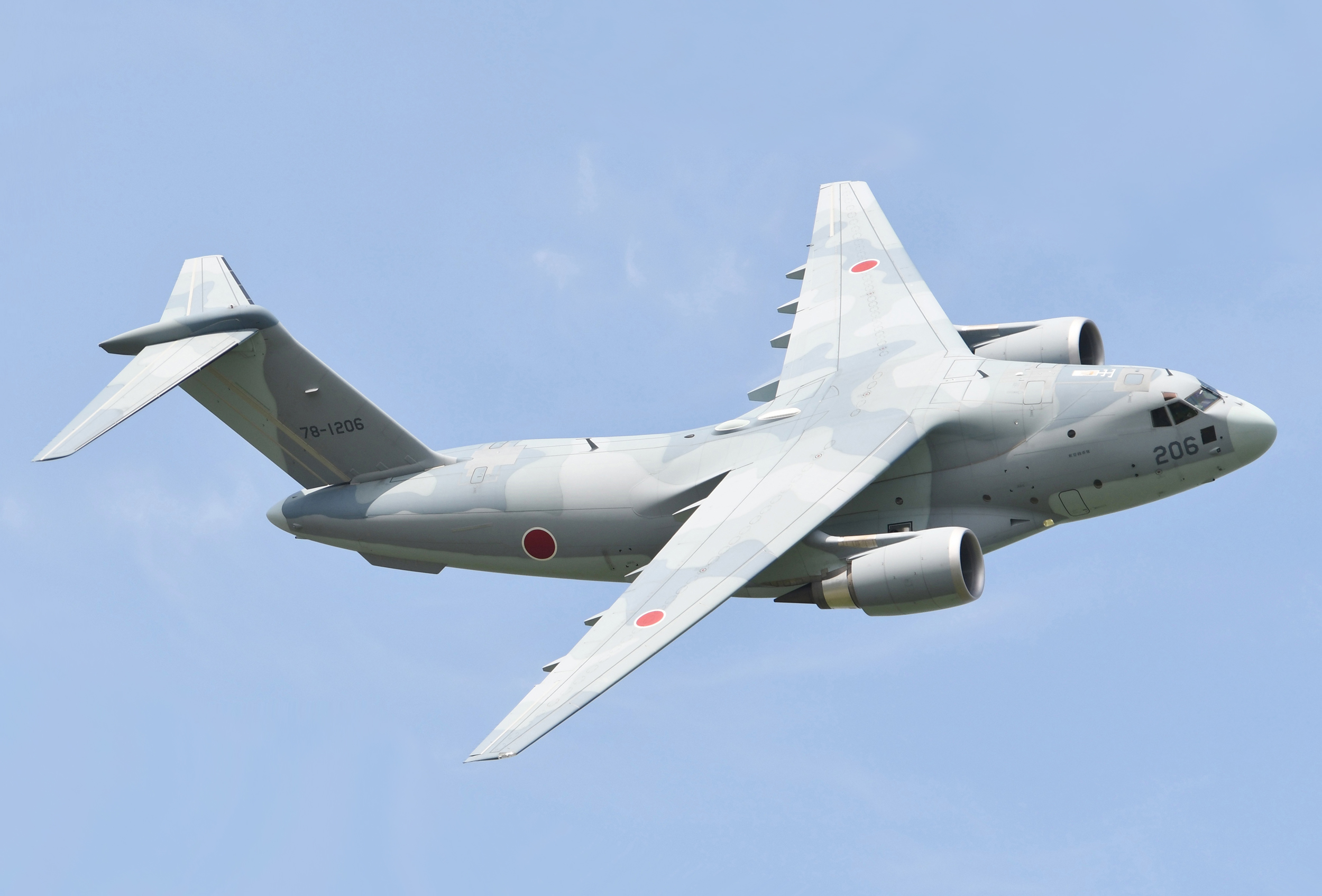
- A C-2 fly over at Miho Air Base

General information
- Type: Military transport aircraft
- National origin: Japan
- Manufacturer: Kawasaki Aerospace Company
- Status: In service, in production
- Primary user: Japan Air Self-Defense Force
- Number built: 21

History
- Manufactured: 2010–present
- Introduction date: 30 June 2016
- First flight: 26 January 2010

The Kawasaki C-2 (previously XC-2 and C-X) is a mid-size, twin-turbofan engine, long range, high speed military transport aircraft developed and manufactured by Kawasaki Aerospace Company. Designed to replace the older Kawasaki C-1, the C-2 formally entered service with the Japan Air Self-Defense Force (JASDF) in June 2016. There are ongoing efforts to sell it overseas.

== Development ==
After researching foreign aircraft such as the C-130J Super Hercules, C-17 Globemaster III, and Airbus A400M, the Japanese Ministry of Defense concluded that there were no aircraft in production that possessed the capabilities that the JASDF required. In response to this need, the Japanese MOD commenced the production of plans to develop an indigenously designed and manufactured transport aircraft. In 1995, Kawasaki appealed to the Japanese Defense Agency (JDA) to issue funding for the development of a domestically built C-X transport aircraft. In 2000, the JDA began forming its requirement for the replacement military airlifter; early determinations for the proposed project included that it would be powered by turbofan engines, possess the range to reach Hawaii from Japan, and carry double the payload of the C-130.

In May 2001, the MOD formally issued a request for proposals in regards to the new transport aircraft, referred to as the C-X program; at the time, the MOD planned to procure 40 aircraft to replace its aging Kawasaki C-1 and C-130 Hercules fleets. In December 2001, it was announced that Kawasaki Aerospace Company, the aerospace division of Kawasaki Heavy Industries, had been selected by the JDA as the prime contractor to develop the C-X.

Kawasaki developed the C-X in parallel with the P-X, which it had also been selected to develop. As a cost saving measure, major airframe parts and system components were shared between the two aircraft. They use the same basic wing structure, although it is installed at different sweep angle and dihedral on the two versions, with different high lift devices and powerplant attachments. Common components include the cockpit windows, outer wings, horizontal stabilizer, and other systems. Internal shared parts include the auxiliary power unit, cockpit panel, flight control system computer, anti-collision lights, and gear control unit. As of 2007, the total development cost for the two aircraft has been ¥345 billion (equivalent to ¥391.94 billion or US$2.59 billion in 2024), which is low compared to other programs; for example, the development contract for the Boeing P-8 Poseidon was $3.89 billion in 2004.

Several powerplants were considered for the C-X, including the Rolls-Royce Trent 800, the General Electric CF6-80C2L1F and the Pratt & Whitney PW4000. In May 2003, Ishikawajima-Harima Heavy Industries (IHI) announced its support of General Electric's CF6-80C2L1F engine, having formed an arrangement to locally manufacture the powerplant. That same year, the CF6-80C2L1F was selected to power the type. In August 2003, it was announced that the C-X project had passed a preliminary JDA design review, allowing for prototype manufacturing to proceed.

During the construction of the first prototype, there was a problem discovered with some American-made rivets which delayed the roll-out to 4 July 2007 along with its cousin aircraft P-X (since designated as the P-1). During structural testing, deformation of the XP-1 / XC-2 horizontal stabiliser was found, as well as cracking in the XC-2 undercarriage trunnion structure and parts of the fuselage; the cracking problem was reportedly difficult to address. The C-X program was embroiled in further controversy when allegations that bribery had been involved in the purchase of five General Electric CF6-80C2 engines, used to power the aircraft, were made by prosecutors.

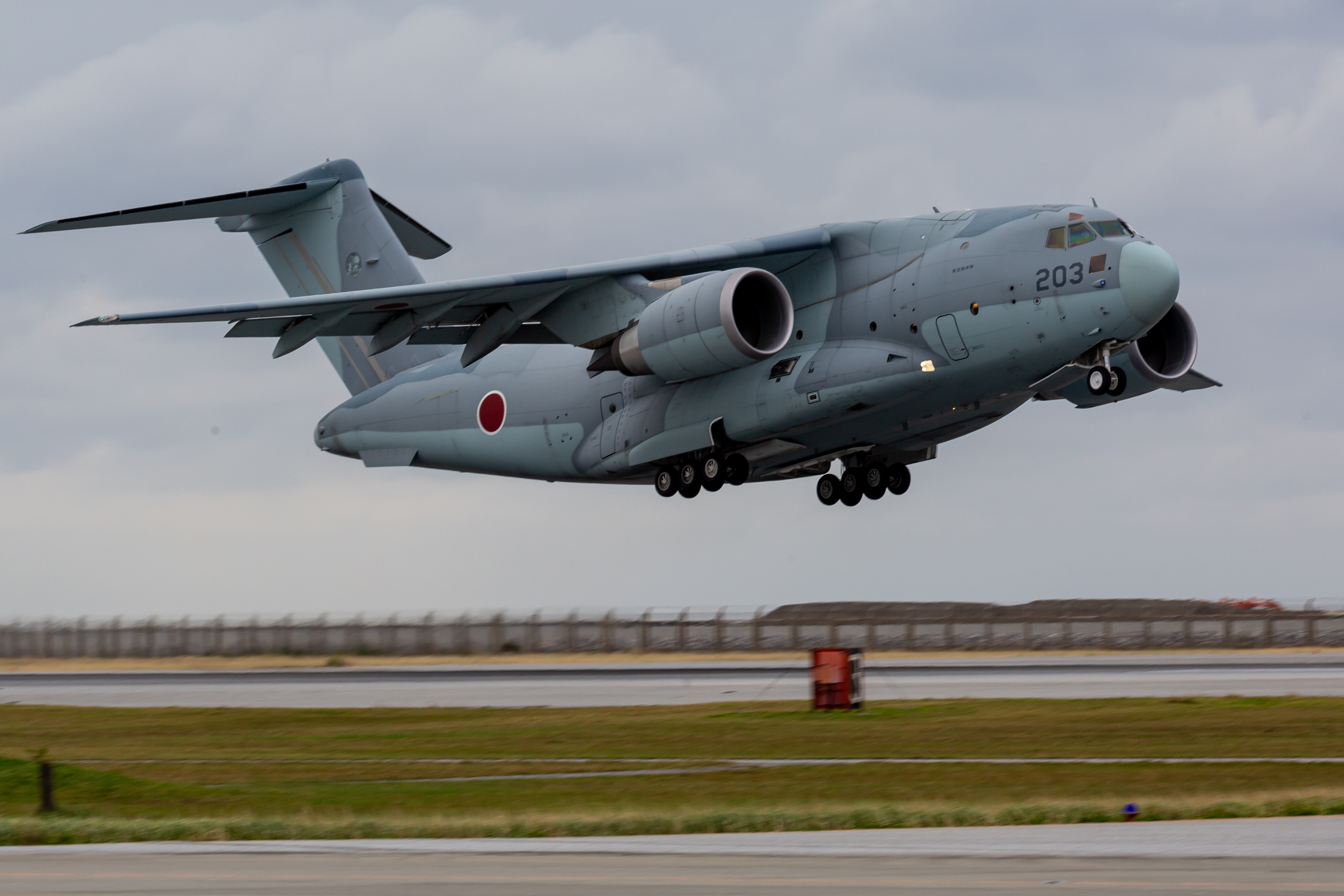
A C-2 taking off at the Naha Air Show in 2018

In 2008, according to the Chunichi Shimbun, the C-2 was set to cost about ¥10 billion (equivalent to ¥11.2 billion or US$74.02 million in 2024). Postponement of the F-X program and the need to increase funding of the F-15J fleet modernisation program have necessitated the implementation of a one-year delay in the C-X program. In 2014, the aircraft was delayed again following the failure of the rear cargo door during pressure tests. The delay will increase the program cost by ¥40 billion (equivalent to ¥45.49 billion or US$300.51 million in 2024) to 260 billion yen in addition to delays to the program. In March 2016, it was reported that the C-2 program faced delays of five years from its initial schedule due to technical problems, while development costs were then estimated to hit ¥264.3 billion, ¥80 billion more than initially projected. On 27 March 2017, the Japanese Ministry of Defense announced that development of the C-2 was completed.

Kawasaki has also studied the development of a civil-orientated version of the C-2 with ambitions to sell the type to commercial operators. In this variant, tentatively designated as the YC-X, little modification is envisioned from the C-2, making use of transferable technologies from the military airlifter, although the intended payload is likely to be increased from the C-2's 26-ton maximum to 37 tons. In 2007, it was stated that the development of a civilian derivative of the C-2 has been given a lower priority than the completion of the military airlifter.

In late 2012, Kawasaki was in the process of consulting potential customers on the topic of the YC-X for transporting outsize cargo; based upon customer feedback, Kawasaki forecast an estimated demand for up to 100 freighters capable of handling bulky cargoes between 2020 and 2030.

On March 20, 2023, Kawasaki representatives said that they are looking into lowering the C-2's production cost, which is a concern both the Ministry of Defense and potential export customers have mentioned to them in the past.

== Design ==
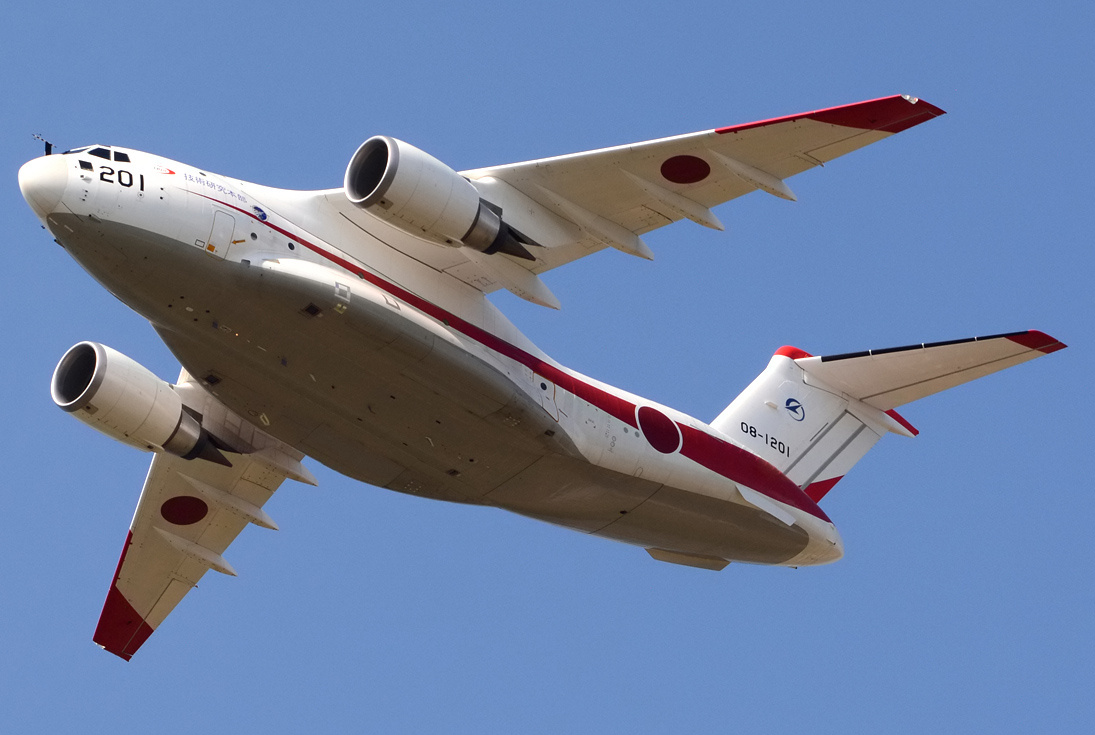
The C-2 prototype

The Kawasaki C-2 is a long range twin-engine transport aircraft. In comparison with the older C-1 that it replaces, the C-2 can carry payloads up to four times heavier, such as MIM-104 Patriot surface-to-air missile batteries and Mitsubishi H-60 helicopters, and possesses six times the range.

The C-2 is being developed to meet the following requirements of the Ministry of Defense: a minimum payload of 26 tonnes, 120 metric ton (264,552 lb 132.275 short ton) take-off weight, ability to takeoff/land on short runways, (Requirement: 500m, almost same as C-1, e.g. Tachikawa—900 m, Kamigoto—800 m, Hateruma—800 m), a maximum payload of 37,600 kg whilst taking off from a 2,300 m Take-off Field Length at a 141 tonnes (310,851 lb 155.42 short ton) take-off weight, ability to fly international airroutes (Requirement: Mach 0.8+; JDA ruled out C-17 as a candidate by its lower cruising speed. Conventional cargo aircraft cannot cruise at optimum altitude on commercial airroutes because of their lower cruising speed and are often assigned to lower altitude by ATC.), in-flight aerial refuelling and forward looking infrared systems.

The C-2 is powered by a pair of General Electric CF6-80C2K turbofan engines. While sharing fuselage components with the Kawasaki P-1, the fuselage of the C-2's is substantially larger to accommodate a vast internal cargo deck, which is furnished with an automated loading/unloading system to reduce workloads on personnel and ground equipment. The forward fuselage and horizontal stabilizer is made of an internally-designed composite material, KMS6115. A tactical flight management system and head-up display is installed to reduce the challenges involved in flying at low altitudes or close to mountainous terrain. The C-2 is equipped with a full glass cockpit, fly-by-wire flight controls, a high-precision navigation system, and self protection systems.

== Variants ==
=== RC-2 ===
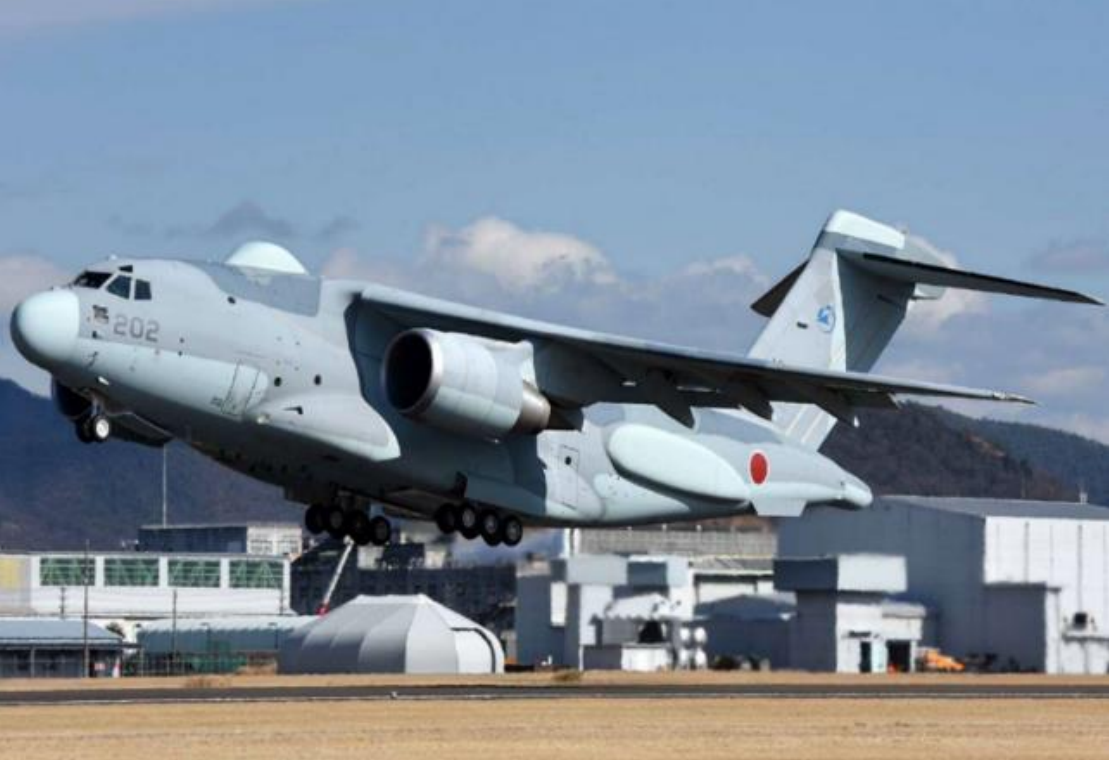
Kawasaki RC-2

The RC-2s had been in development since 2015. On 6 February 2018, 2nd prototype "18-1202" was converted to "RC-2" as an electronic intelligence platform at Gifu Air Field.

In October 2020, the JASDF introduced the RC-2 electronic intelligence (ELINT) aircraft into service at Iruma Air Base, some of which will replace the NAMC YS-11EB and possibly -EA for electronic warfare tasks.

=== EC-2 Stand-Off Jammer ===
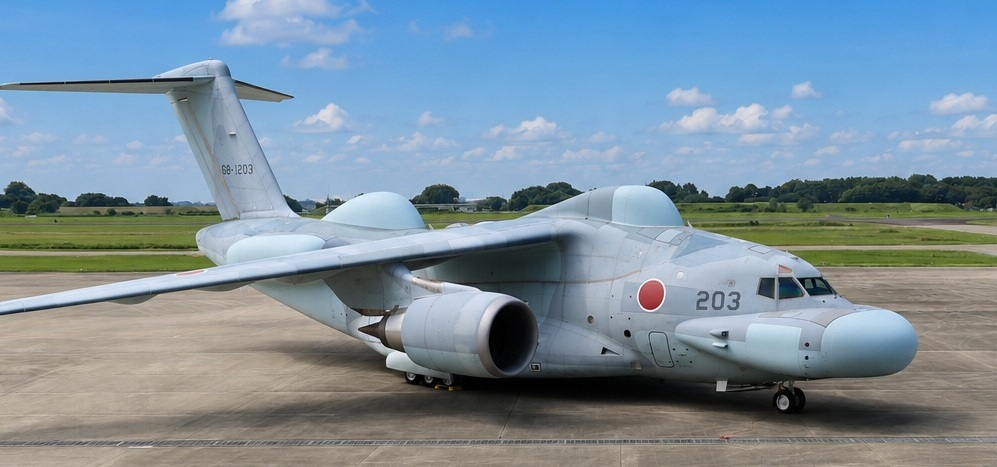
EC-2 Stand-Off Jammer

The Stand-Off Electronic Warfare Aircraft (スタンド・オフ電子戦機), or SOJ, colloquially known as the EC-2, is an Electronic-warfare aircraft intended to replace the EC-1, which has been in service since 1986.

The aircraft is based on serial 68-1203, the third C-2 transport completed, which has been converted for its specialist electronic warfare role.

Development has been underway since 2021, with the aircraft first publicly spotted at Gifu Air Base in February 2026. It features a bulbous nose similar to that of the EC-1, along with two large bulges on the upper fuselage and two further bulges on the sides of the fuselage between the wings and the horizontal stabilizers, housing ESM, ECM, and SATCOM equipment. Some systems are inherited from the EC-1, including the J/ALQ-5 electronic countermeasures suite. The program is divided into two phases, focusing on the integration of the new capabilities and their refinement respectively, with ¥41.4 billion allocated to its development in total.

Its maiden flight took place on 17 March 2026, departing Gifu Air Base at 11:30 am local time and returning approximately three hours later. Flight testing is being conducted jointly by the JASDF's Aviation Development and Testing Group and the Acquisition, Technology & Logistics Agency (ATLA), who stated they intend to continue working toward its introduction to improve capabilities in the electromagnetic domain.

Development is expected to be completed in fiscal year 2026, with service entry in fiscal year 2027, after which the aircraft will be assigned to the Electronic Warfare Operations Group at Iruma Air Base.

== Operational history ==
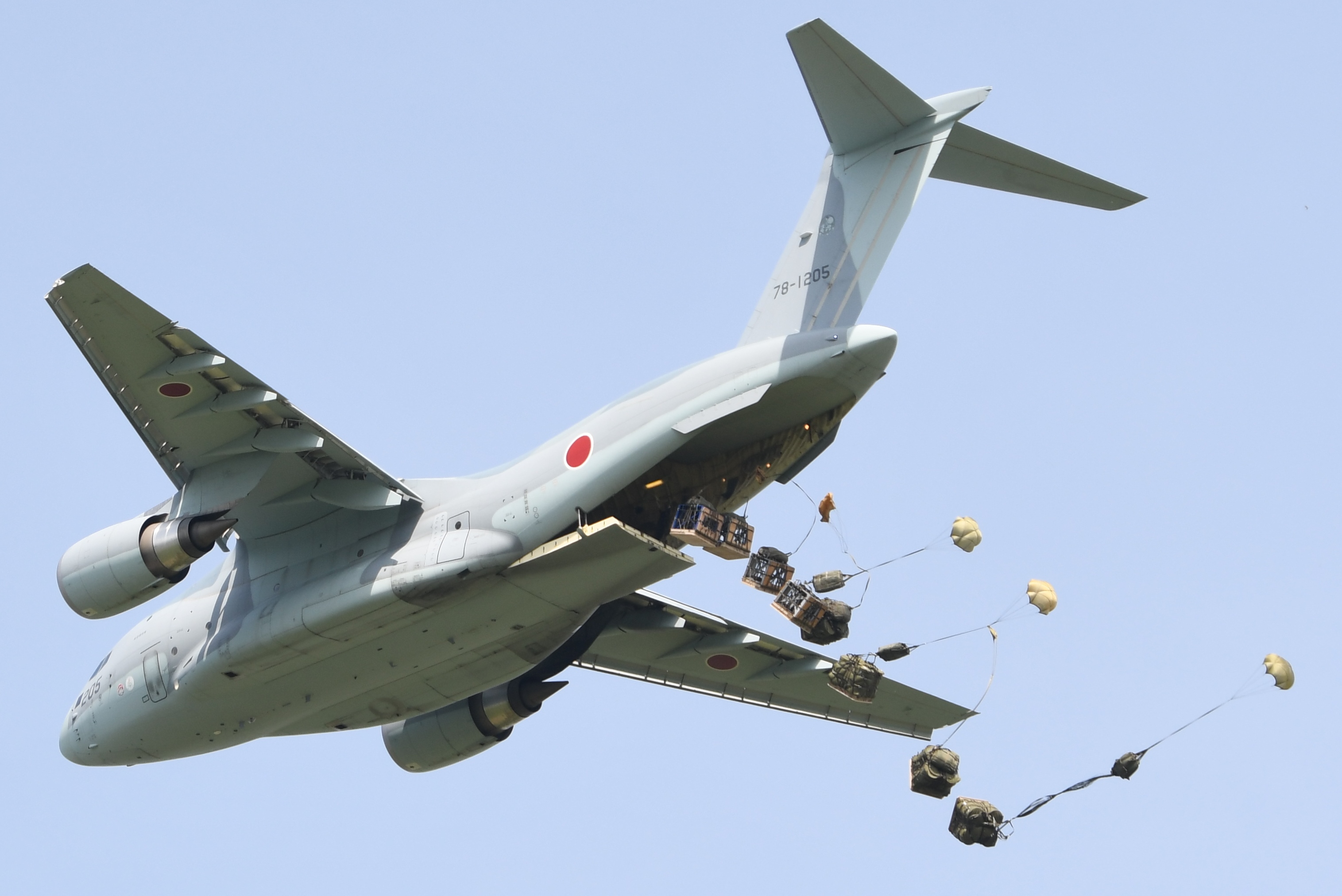
Airdrop demonstration

On 26 January 2010, the maiden flight of the XC-2 took place from Gifu Air Field, Chūbu region, Japan; this first flight was reportedly carried out without any problems occurring. Prior to the first flight, the aircraft was re-designated as the C-2. On 30 March 2010, the first aircraft was delivered to the Japanese Ministry of Defence.

On 24 February 2016, 1st prototype "08-1201" was redelivered from reinforced body exchange programme, and 2nd prototype "18-1202" is undergoing the programme from May.

In March 2016, the JASDF announced that the C-2 airlifter had formally entered operational service.

On 30 June 2016, 1st production model "68-1203" was delivered to Air Development and Test Wing at Gifu Air Field.

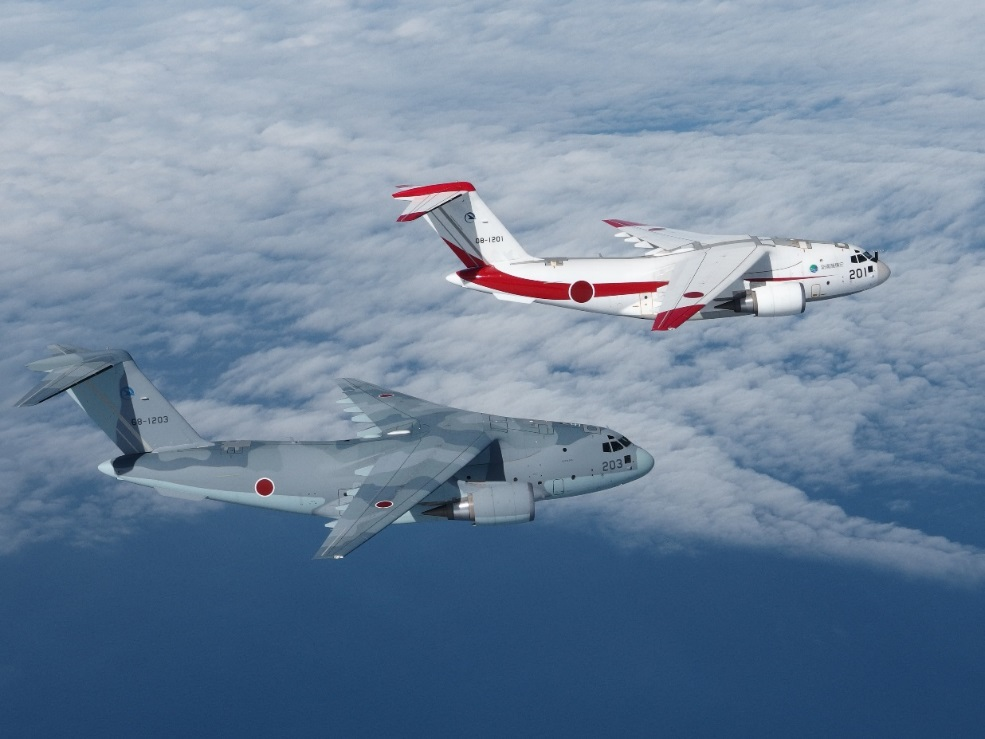
1st production model "68-1203" and 1st prototype "08-1201" (2016)

On 20 October 2016, the maiden flight of 2nd production model "68-1204" was held.

On 28 March 2017, first three C-2s were dispatched to 403rd Tactical Airlift Squadron at Miho Air Base.

In November 2017 a C-2 deployed to the Japan Self-Defense Force Base Djibouti in Africa for the first time.

On 23 August 2021, at the request of the United States, the National Security Council of Japan dispatched one C-2 carrier from Iruma Air Base to assist with the 2021 Afghanistan airlift, following the Fall of Kabul.

=== Sales efforts ===
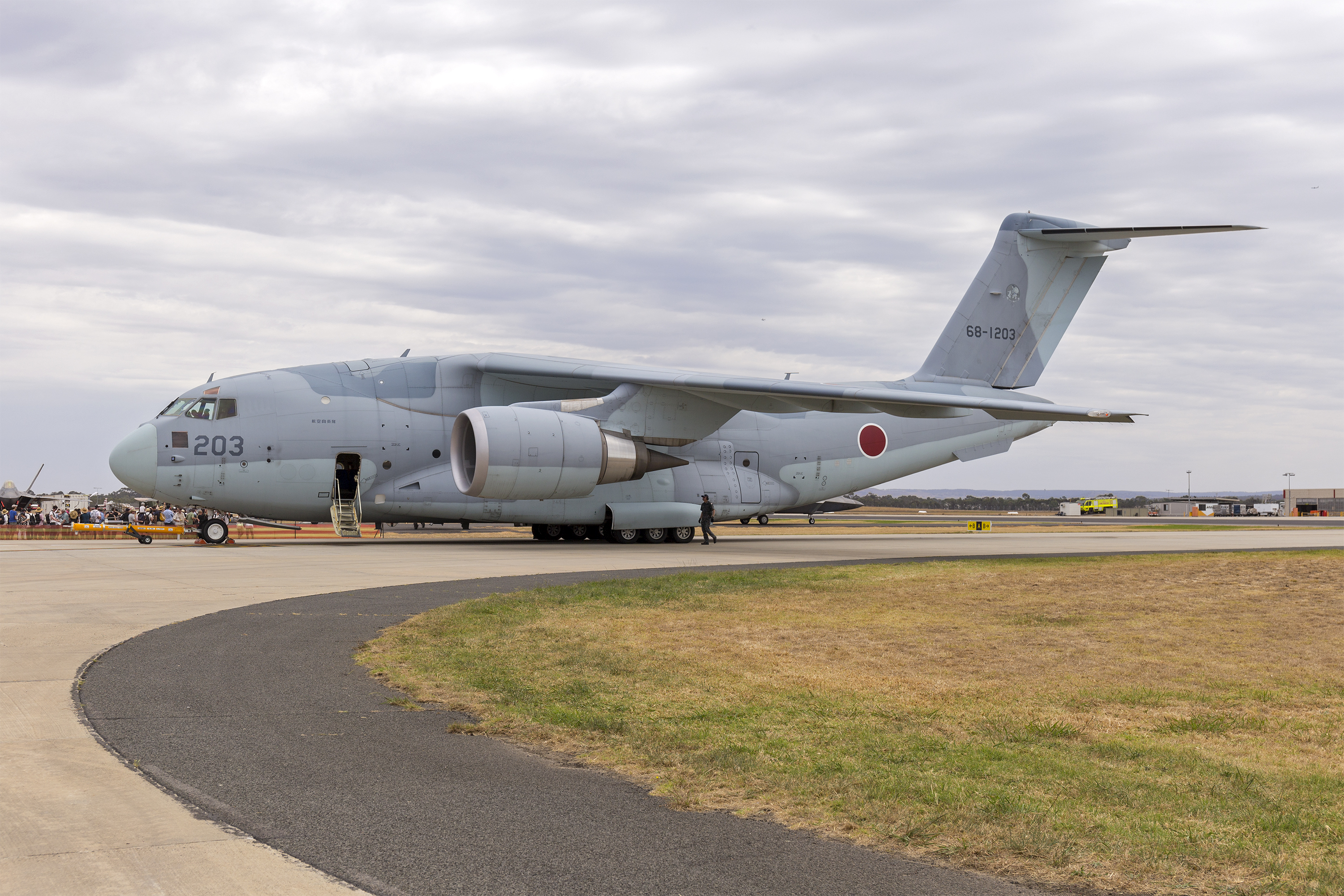
A Japanese C-2 being deployed to the 2019 Australian International Airshow for promotion.

Kawasaki has been reportedly keen to seek sales of the C-2 to overseas customers in addition to the domestic market. In the strategic airlift role, the C-2 is one of only a few aircraft in production that can perform its role; others include the Airbus A400M Atlas and the Ilyushin Il-76, and thus has few competitors on the world market. In response to plans by the Japanese government to lower historic defense export restrictions, Kawasaki began actively promoting the C-2 to foreign customers in 2015.

The C-2 appeared at the Dubai Airshow in November 2017.

In July 2018 a C-2 appeared at the Royal International Air Tattoo.

== Operators ==
Japan

- Japan Air Self-Defense Force

As of March 2022, the JASDF operated 14 C-2s.
- Air Development and Test Wing (2010–present)
- 3rd Tactical Airlift Wing
  - 403rd Tactical Airlift Squadron (2017–present)
- 2nd Tactical Airlift Wing
  - 402nd Tactical Airlift Squadron (2021–present)

== Orders ==
Fiscal year	Procurement aircraft and parts + development budget (¥ billion)	Variants			Notes
Fiscal year	Procurement aircraft and parts + development budget (¥ billion)	C-2; Transport	RC-2; ELINT / SIGINT	C-2 SOJ; Stand-off jammer (EW aircraft)	Notes
2027	–	–	–	–	–
2026	RC-2: ¥ 50.3	–	1	–	
2025	RC-2: ¥ 45.7; C-2 SOJ: ¥ 41.3	–	1	1	
2024	RC-2: ¥ 49.3 + 14.3; C-2 SOJ: ¥ 14.1	–	1	–	
2023	C-2: ¥ 59.7; RC-2: ¥ 13.0; C-2 SOJ: ¥ 8.3	2	–	–	
2022	C-2: ¥ 22.1 + 2.6; RC-2: ¥ 4.6 + 0.1; C-2 SOJ: ¥ 19.0	1	–	–	
2021	C-2: ¥ 22.5 RC-2: ¥ 6.9; C-2 SOJ: ¥ 10.0	1	–	–	
2020	C-2: ¥ 22.0; C-2 SOJ: ¥ 15.0	–	–	–	
2019	C-2: ¥ 45.3	2	–	–	
2018	C-2: ¥ 43.5	2	–	–	
2017	C-2: ¥ 55.3	3	–	–	
2016	C-2: ¥ 8.7	–	–	–	
2015	–	–	–	–	
2014	C-2: ¥ 39.8	2	–	–	
2013	–	–	–	–	
2012	C-2: ¥ 32.9	2	–	–	
2011	C-2: ¥ 37.4	2	–	–	
Total	¥ 683.7 (+ ¥ 0.0)	17 (+ 0)	3 (+ 0)	1 (+ 0)	–
Total	¥ 683.7 (+ ¥ 0.0)	21 (+ 0)			–

Budget request

== Accidents and incidents ==
The C-2 fleet has no recorded hull losses or associated fatalities as of May 2024.

- On 9 June 2017, a JASDF C-2 of the 403rd Tactical Airlift Squadron, registration 78-1205, carrying six people, slid over the runway at Yonago Airport when its steering gear and brakes failed. No injuries were reported. The following investigation blamed pilot error.
- On 9 May 2024, a JASDF C-2 carrying eight people was forced to make an emergency landing at Niigata Airport after one of the cockpit windows slid open during a training flight. No one was injured.

== Specifications (C-2) ==
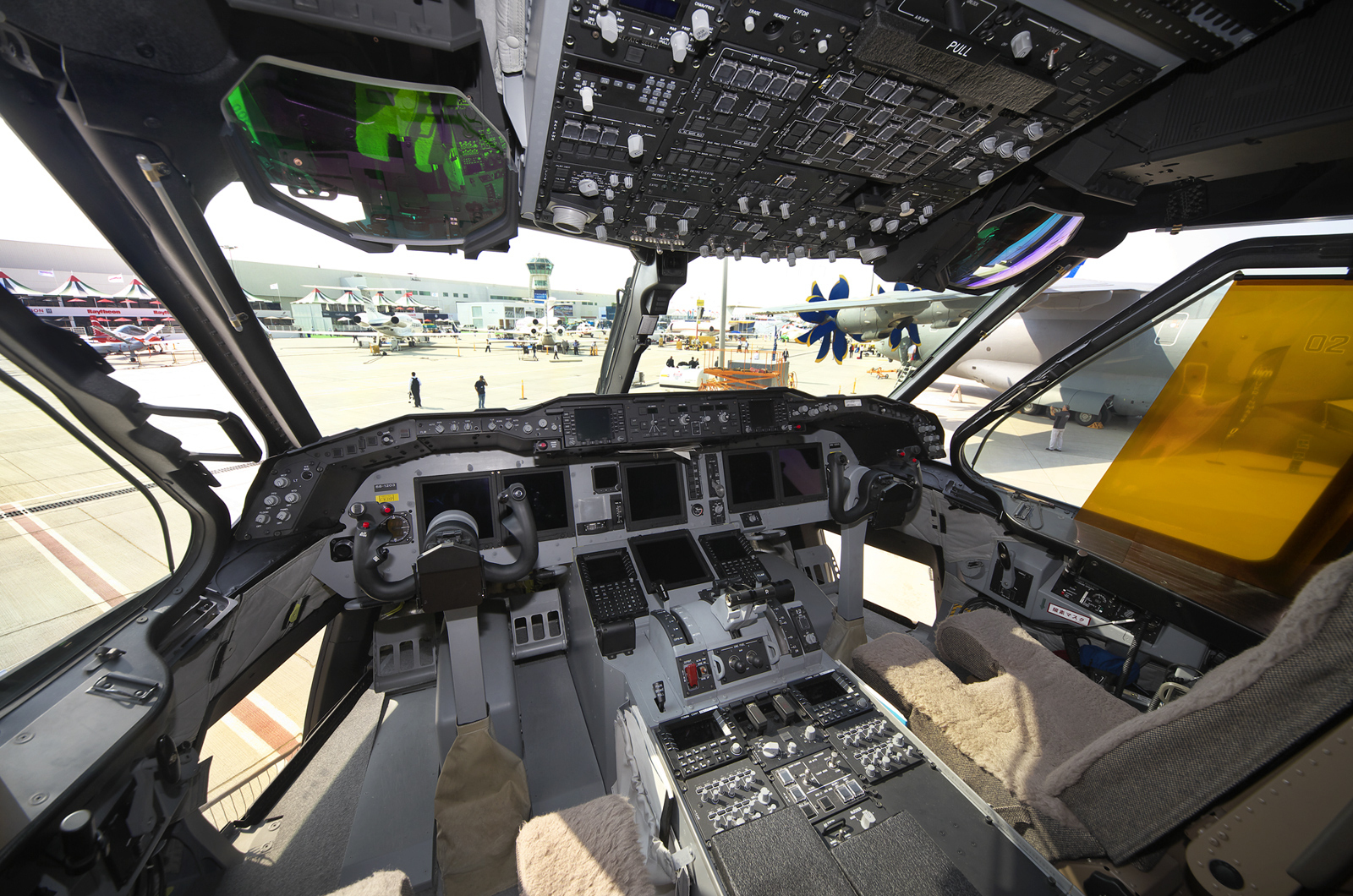
Cockpit of a C-2 (2017)

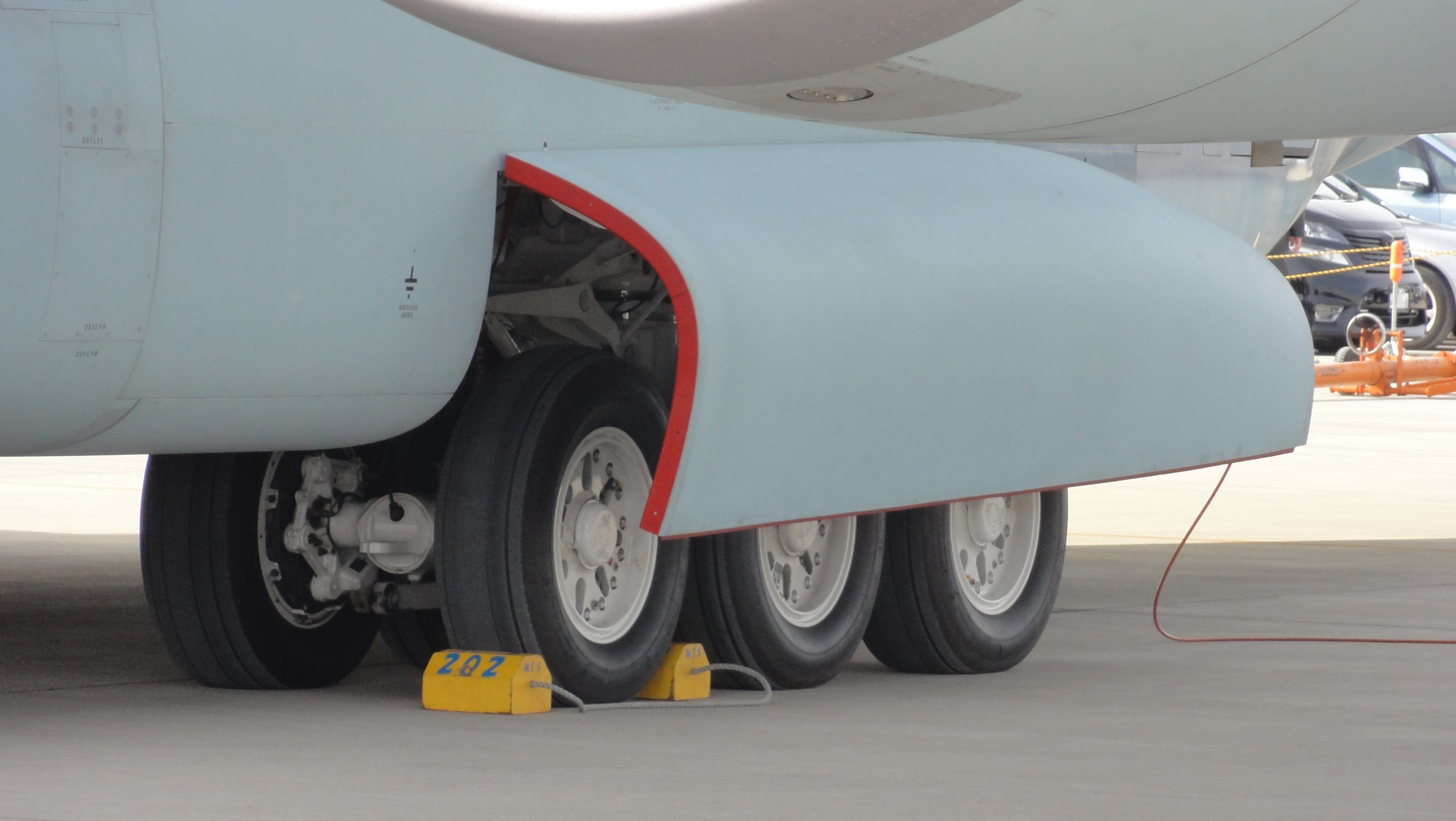
Main landing gear of a C-2 (2011)

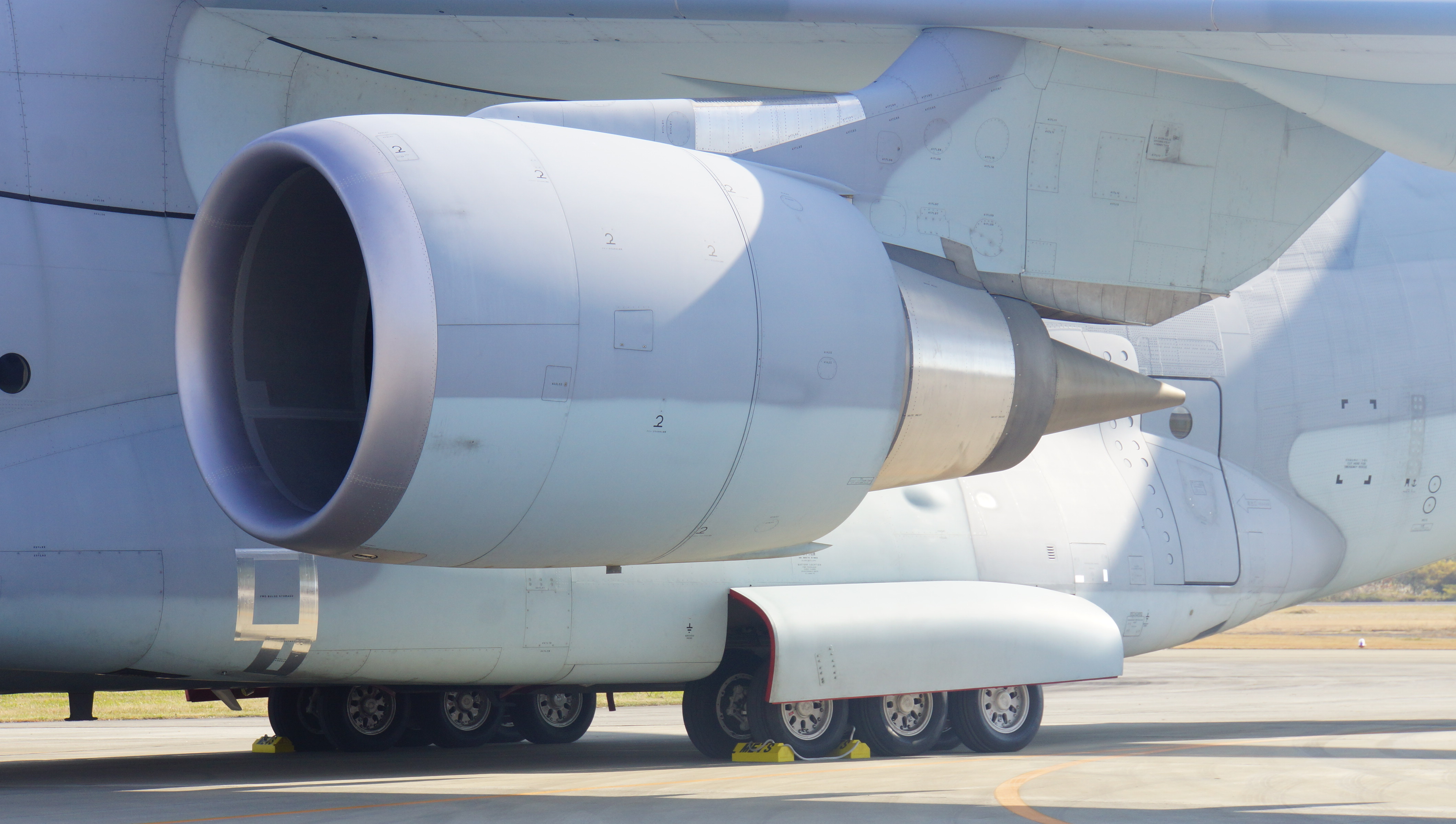
CF6-80C2K1F engine of a C-2 (2014)

Data from Flight International Acquisition, Technology & Logistics Agency : C-2 Cargo Aircraft

General characteristics

- Crew: 3: 2 pilots and 1 loadmaster
- Capacity: 32 t limited to +2.5g ; 36 t limited to +2.25g ; maximum payload 37.6 t
  - Field Operation System or
  - Truck Crane or
  - 8 463L Pallets or
  - 1 UH-60JA helicopter or
  - 1 Type 16 maneuver combat vehicle wheeled tank destroyer
- Length: 43.9 m (144 ft 0 in)
- Wingspan: 44.4 m (145 ft 8 in)
- Height: 14.2 m (46 ft 7 in)
- Empty weight: 69,000 kg (152,119 lb)
- Max takeoff weight: 141,400 kg (311,734 lb)
- Powerplant: 2 × General Electric CF6-80C2K1F turbofan engines, 265.7 kN (59,740 lbf) thrust each

Performance

- Maximum speed: 920 km/h (570 mph, 500 kn)
- Maximum speed: Mach 0.82
- Cruise speed: 890 km/h (550 mph, 480 kn) / M0.8
- Range: 7,600 km (4,700 mi, 4,100 nmi) with 20 t (20 long tons; 22 short tons) payload

5,700 km (3,500 mi; 3,100 nmi) with 30 t (30 long tons; 33 short tons) payload
4,500 km (2,800 mi; 2,400 nmi) with 36 t (35 long tons; 40 short tons) payload

- Ferry range: 9,800 km (6,100 mi, 5,300 nmi)
- Service ceiling: 13,100 m (43,000 ft)
- Minimum takeoff distance: 500 m (1,641 ft)

== See also ==
Related development

- Kawasaki P-1 – Japanese maritime patrol aircraft
- Kawasaki YPX – Japanese proposed twin-engined airliner developed from P-1 maritime patrol aircraft

Aircraft of comparable role, configuration, and era

- Antonov An-70 – Ukrainian/Russian military transport aircraft prototype by Antonov Max. Payload 47t
- Airbus A400M Atlas – Multi-national four-engine turboprop military transport aircraft Max. Payload 37t
- Embraer C-390 Millennium – Brazilian military transport aircraft/tanker Max. Payload 26t

Related lists

- List of military aircraft of Japan
