= Kawasaki C-1 =

Japanese military transport aircraft

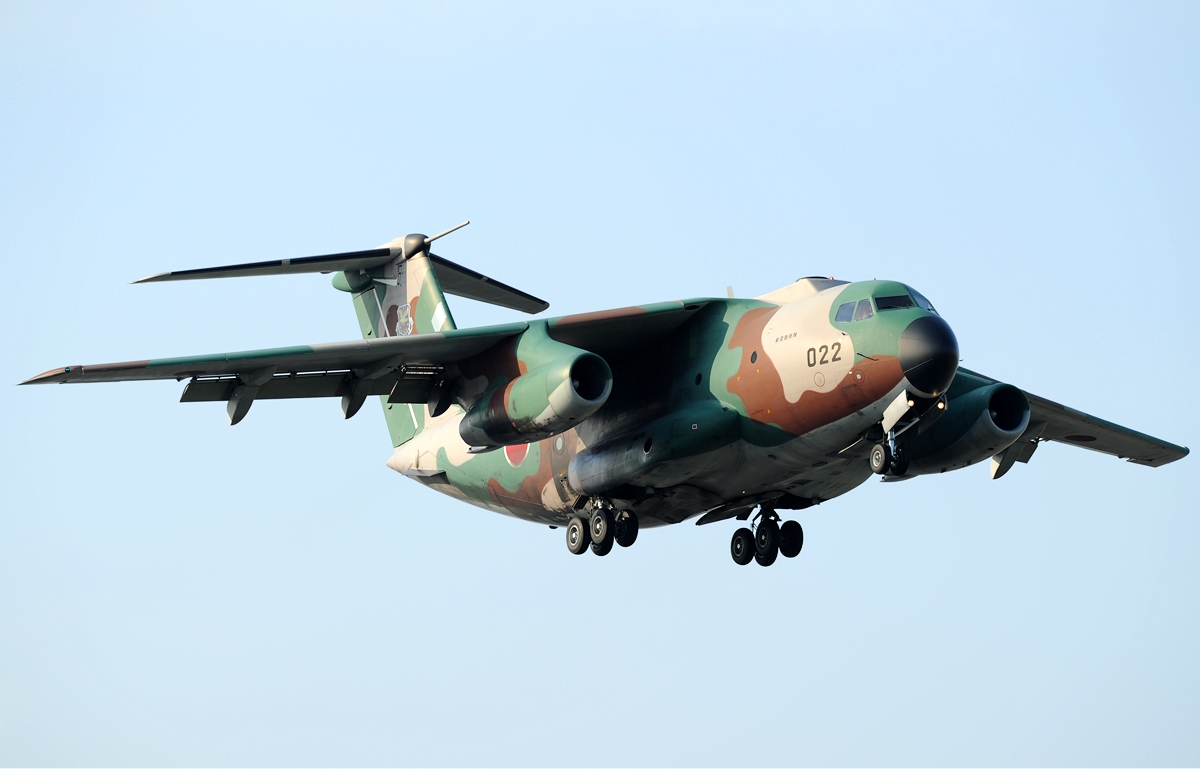
- A JASDF C-1 at Iruma Air Base in 2011

General information
- Type: Military transport aircraft
- National origin: Japan
- Manufacturer: Kawasaki Heavy Industries
- Status: Retired
- Primary user: Japan Air Self-Defense Force
- Number built: 31

History
- Introduction date: December 1974
- First flight: 12 November 1970
- Retired: 15 March 2025

The Kawasaki C-1 (川崎 C-1) is a twin-engined short-range military transport aircraft developed and manufactured by the Japanese conglomerate Kawasaki Heavy Industries. It was solely used by the Japan Air Self-Defense Force (JASDF).

Development of the C-1 commenced in 1966 in response to a requirement from the JASDF, which sought an indigenous jet-powered replacement for its aging Second World War–era Curtiss C-46 Commando transport fleet. First flown on 12 November 1970, quantity production of the type commenced during the following year. The C-1 has formed the backbone of the JASDF's transport capability throughout the latter half of the twentieth century and the initial years of the twenty-first century as well. During the 2010s, Kawasaki developed a newer, larger, and longer-range airlifter, the Kawasaki C-2, which will eventually replace the JASDF's C-1 fleet entirely.

== Design and development ==
By 1966, the transport fleet of the Japan Air Self-Defense Force (JASDF) was primarily composed of Curtiss C-46 Commandos, an American transport aircraft that had been manufactured primarily during the Second World War, and was considered to be quite capable aircraft for the era. By the mid-1960s, the capabilities of the decades-old C-46 had paled in comparison to numerous newer aircraft such as the Lockheed C-130 Hercules, motivating some officials within the JASDF to lobby for a domestically designed and -manufactured transport aircraft with which to replace it. Such ambitions were successfully incorporated into the Third Defense Buildup Plan.

With this purpose in mind, the JASDF approached the Nihon Aircraft Manufacturing Corporation (NAMC), a consortium of several major Japanese corporations, which was by this time engaged in the production of the YS-11, an indigenously developed airliner of the postwar era. During 1966, NAMC commenced design work on what would subsequently be designated as the C-1. Following a design review of the programme, NAMC decided that the Japanese conglomerate Kawasaki Heavy Industries would serve as the airlifter's prime contractor; it is for this reason that aircraft bears the Kawasaki name.

In addition to Kawasaki's heavy contribution to the programme, significant portions of the airlifter were manufactured by other members of NAMC. Specifically, the tail section, as well as the middle and rear portions of the fuselage, were constructed by rival Japanese conglomerate Mitsubishi Heavy Industries, the majority of the wings were produced by Fuji Heavy Industries, the rudder was built by seaplane specialist Shin Meiwa, while the flaps were manufactured by NIPPI Corporation. At the time of its development, the C-1 was only the third indigenous aircraft programme to be undertaken in postwar Japan, coming after only the Fuji T-1 intermediate trainer aircraft and the YS-11 itself.

In terms of its basic configuration, the C-1 is a twin-engine medium-range airlifter, somewhat resembling the larger Lockheed C-141 Starlifter. It is powered by a pair of Pratt & Whitney JT8D-M-9 low-bypass turbofan engines, which were locally manufactured under license by Mitsubishi, each capable of generating up to 64 kN (14,500 lbf) of thrust. In terms of payload capacity, a single C-1 could carry up to 80 fully-equipped troops, 45 paratroopers, or 36 stretcher-bound personnel, in addition to bulky cargo, including a whole truck or a pair of jeeps, which would be loaded via a ramp deployed at the airlifter's rear. It was designed to be typically operated by a crew of five, comprising two pilots, a flight engineer, a navigator, and a loadmaster. The C-1 incorporates a high-lift system, which includes aerodynamic features such as a leading edge slat and a four-stage Fowler flap, facilitates a high level of short takeoff and landing (STOL) performance, while day-and-night all-weather operations are achieved via the application of numerous electronic navigation systems.

The maximum range of C-1 caused a problem after the island of Okinawa was returned to Japan from the United States; the airlifter was unable to fly directly to Okinawa from most parts of the Japanese home islands. This may have been a factor in the decision to reduce the planned procurement of the C-1 in favour of the American-built C-130H Hercules utility transport aircraft instead, which entered service with the JASDF's 401st Tactical Airlift Squadron in 1989. Another reason for the curtailment was the enactment of general cutbacks upon various military programmes and procurement initiatives during the 1970s.

The Japanese Ministry of International Trade and Industry (MITI) had a considerable interest in the C-1 programme. Beyond its primary purpose as a military-orientated airlifter, at one stage, MITI had decided to adopt the C-1's design as the basis for a next-generation commercial transport project. While some work was undertaken on this initiative, it was subsequently decided to discard such efforts in order to concentrate on international collaboration efforts, such as on the American aerospace company Boeing's new 767 airliner. Efforts were made to incorporate the technologies and knowledge learned from the C-1 programme into other sectors of Japanese commercial undertakings; according to author Richard J. Samuels, substantial benefits, such as a greater understanding of structural design and fatigue-prevention techniques, were transferred into the manufacture of automotive and rolling stock, along with smaller-scale items such as control panels and display systems. However, Samuels also notes that a high-priority political goal of the programme, the transformation of Japan's aerospace companies to become global leaders in the field, was largely unfulfilled.

== Operational history ==
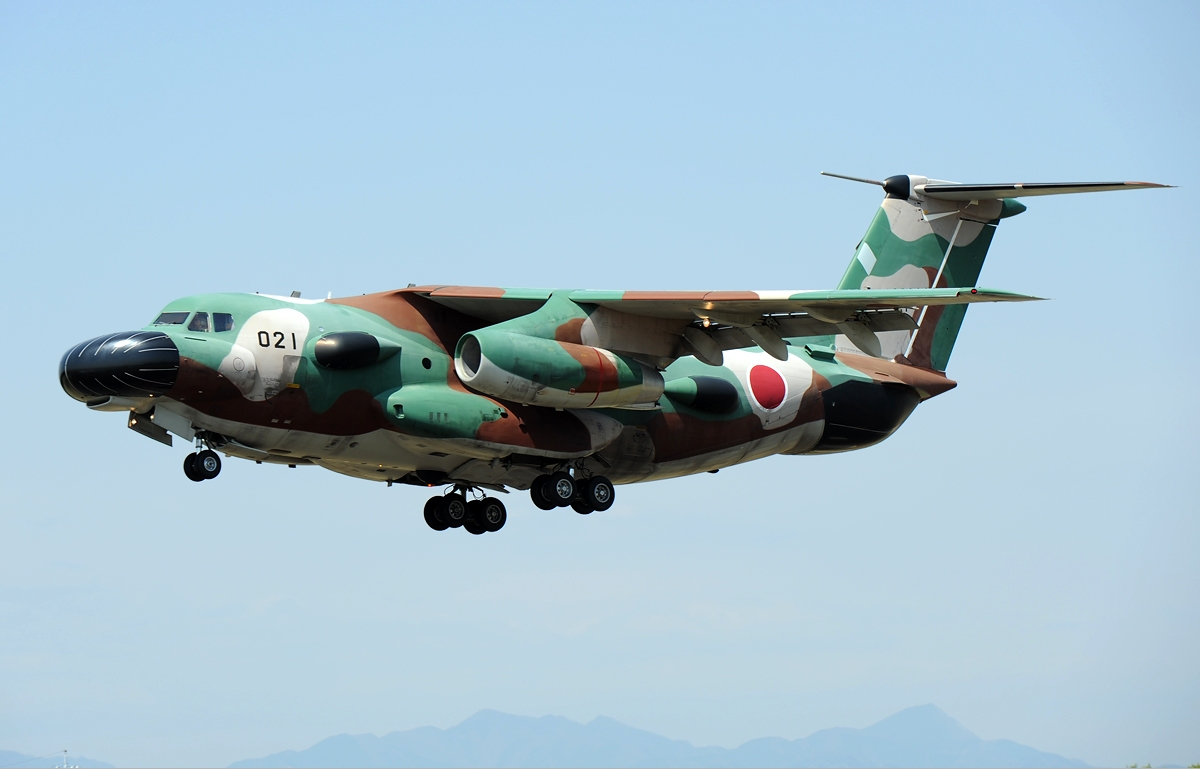
The EC-1 at Iruma Air Base (2011).

The prototype, designated XC-1, performed its maiden flight on 12 November 1970. Following the successful completion of roughly one year of flight testing, the pair of prototypes were turned over to the JASDF for evaluation purposes. Since 1974, the Kawasaki C-1 has been in regular use as a military transport with the JASDF. Its introduction noticeably improved the tactical transport capabilities of the service.

In addition to its military application, there was also a civil user of the C-1. At the urging of MITI, the National Aerospace Laboratory procured a single C-1, which was extensively modified into an experimental testbed. Commonly referred to as either Asuka or QSTOL (Quiet STOL), it flew for a number of years as a 150-seat short takeoff and landing (STOL) aircraft for one of the agency's research programmes.

By 2010, a programme to develop a replacement for the C-1, known as the Kawasaki C-2, had reached the advanced stages of development. In comparison with the older C-1, the C-2 is a considerably larger airlifter, being able to lift three times more payload in terms of weight, as well as possessing greater endurance. On 30 June 2016, the production-standard C-2, "68-1203", was delivered to the Air Development and Test Wing at Gifu Air Field.

== Variants ==
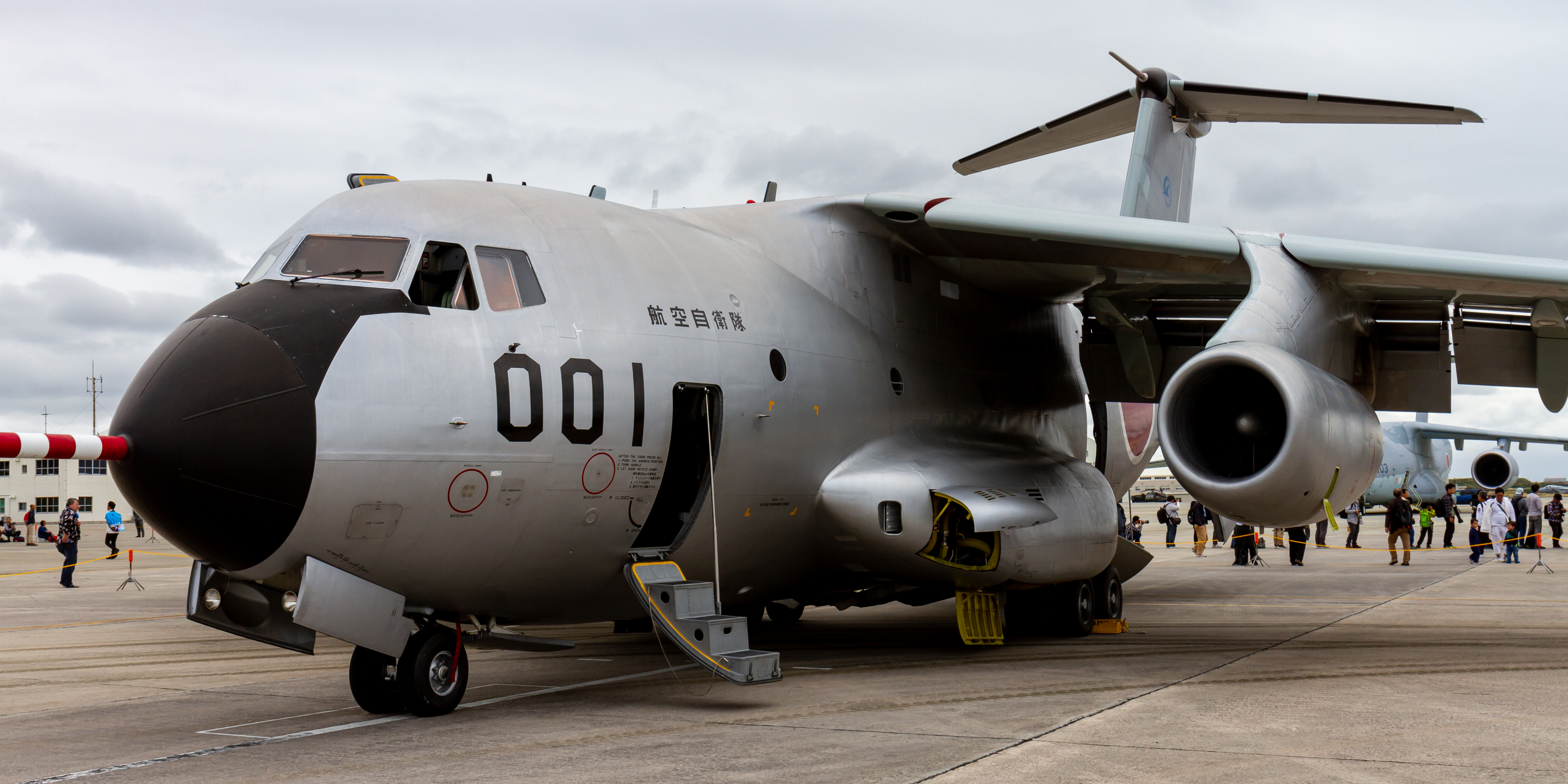
The C-1FTB parked at the Naha Air Show in 2018

- XC-1: Prototypes.
- C-1/C-1A: Medium-range military transport version.

The last five C-1s ordered were fitted with an additional 4,730-litre fuel tank.

- EC-1: electronic warfare training aircraft.
- C-1FTB: Flight test bed used for testing various equipment.

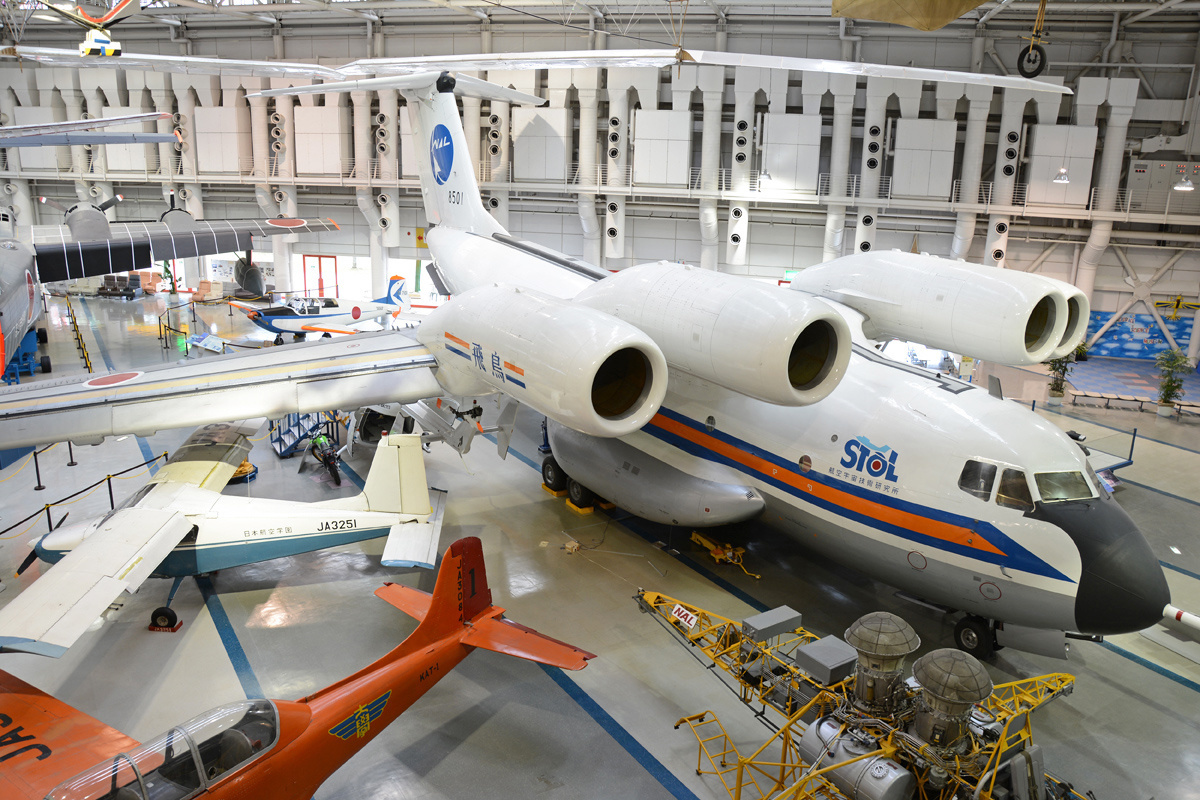
QSTOL Asuka

- Asuka/QSTOL: Quiet STOL research aircraft, developed by the National Aerospace Laboratory.

Powered by four FRJ710 turbofan engines and making use of the Coandă effect. It was built to research STOL using upper surface blowing, aircraft noise reduction, fly-by-wire systems and composite materials construction. The only example built is currently on display in Gifu-Kakamigahara Air and Space Museum in Kakamigahara, Gifu pref., Japan.

Note: Three C-1s were allocated to the MSDF as airborne minelayers under the Fourth Defense Buildup Plan (1972–76). It is unknown what designation was given to them, or indeed whether they were ever actually delivered.

== Operators ==
Japan
As of March 2022, the JASDF operated 7 C-1s.

- Japan Air Self-Defense Force
  - 402nd Tactical Airlift Squadron (1973–present)

=== Former ===
  - 401st Tactical Airlift Squadron (1973–1989)
  - 403rd Tactical Airlift Squadron (1979–2018)

== Accidents ==
19 April 1983
Two C-1s of the 401st Tactical Airlift Squadron crashed near Toba, Mie when the lead two airplanes of a formation of 5 en route from Komaki Air Base to Iruma Air Base flew into a hill while flying in low visibility at low altitude. A third airplane narrowly avoided also crashing and struck trees, but was able to return to Komaki Air Base. Fourteen personnel were killed in these two aircraft, six personnel in airplane 68-1015 and eight in aircraft 58–1009.

18 February 1986
C-1 58-1010 suffered extensive damage on takeoff from Iruma Air Base and was declared a write-off, with no injuries to the crew.

28 June 2000
A C-1 crashed into the sea of Japan's west coast during a test flight with five personnel on board. There were no survivors.

== Specifications (Kawasaki C-1) ==
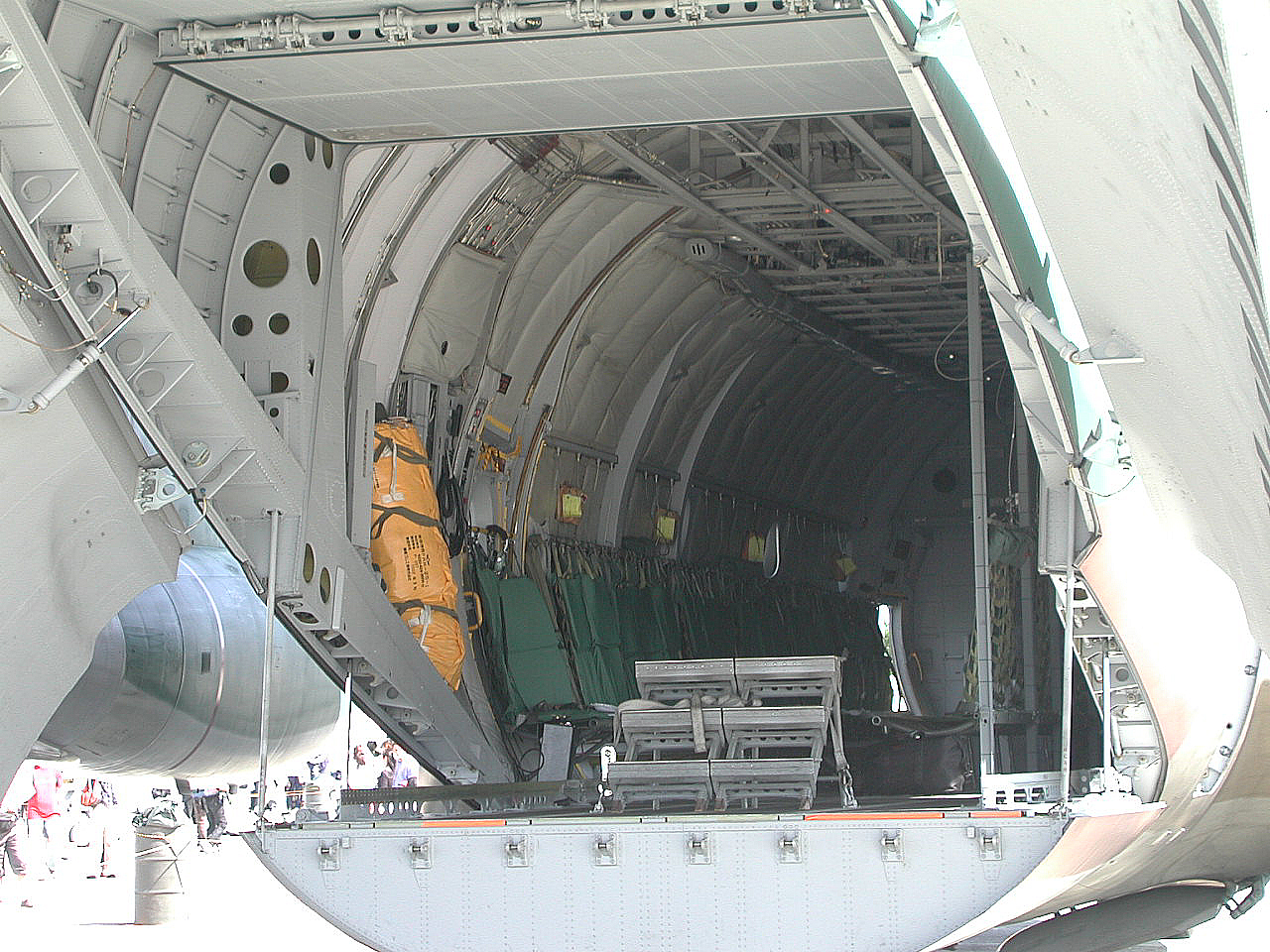
Internal cargo cabin view

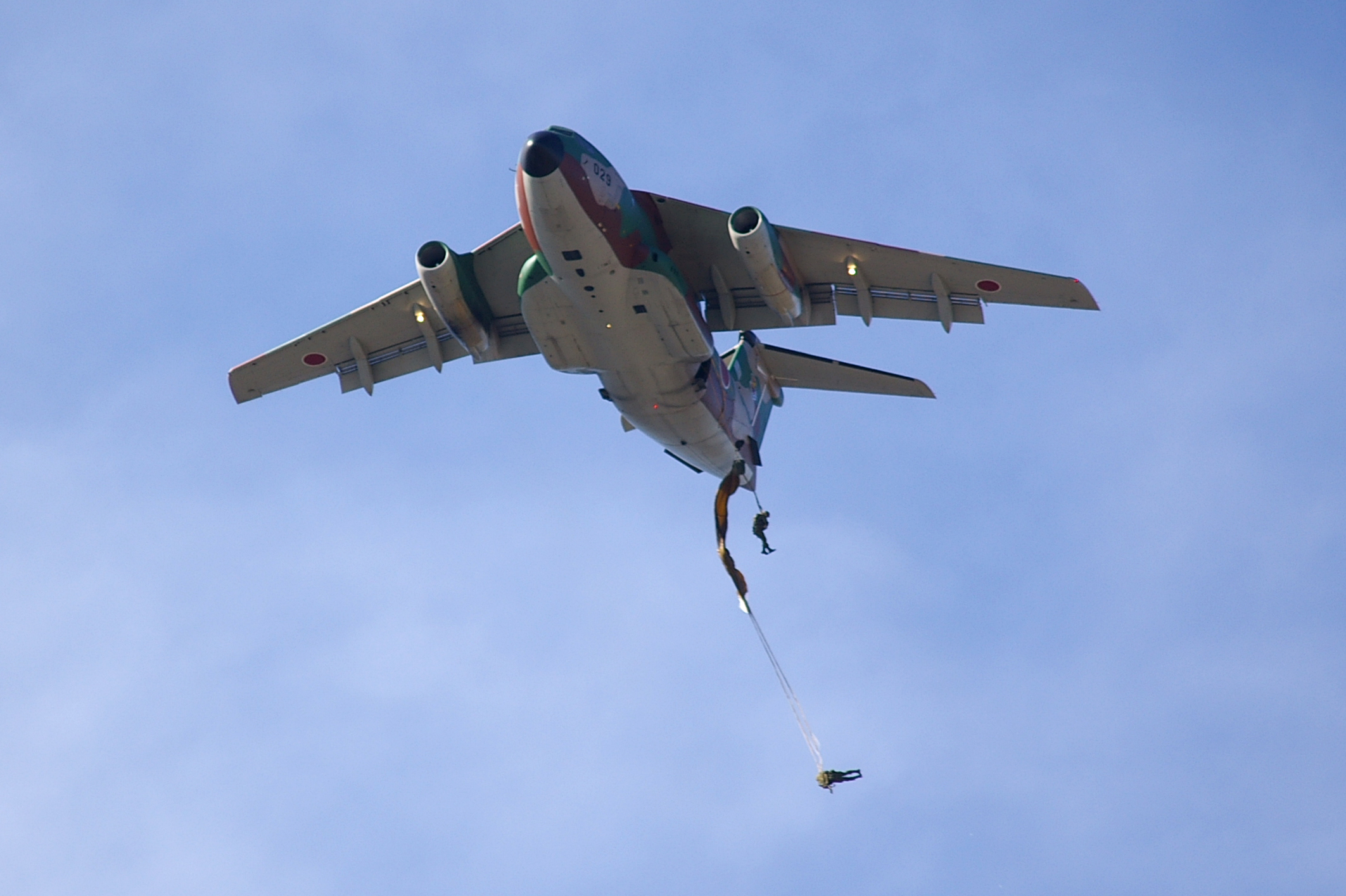
A C-1 deploying paratroopers

Data from Jane's all the world's aircraft, 1975–76

General characteristics

- Crew: 2 flight crew and 3 mission crew
- Capacity: 8,000 kg (18,000 lb) normal payload
- Length: 29 m (95 ft 2 in)
- Wingspan: 30.6 m (100 ft 5 in)
- Height: 9.99 m (32 ft 9 in)
- Wing area: 120.5 m^{2} (1,297 sq ft)
- Aspect ratio: 7.8
- Empty weight: 23,220 kg (51,191 lb)
- Max takeoff weight: 38,700 kg (85,319 lb)
- Fuel capacity: 15,200 L (4,000 US gal; 3,300 imp gal) in 4 integral tanks in the wings
- Powerplant: 2 × Pratt & Whitney JT8D-M-9 (Mitsubishi-built) low-bypass turbofans, 64 kN (14,500 lbf) thrust each

Performance

- Maximum speed: 806 km/h (501 mph, 435 kn) at 7,620 m (25,000 ft) at 35,450 kg (78,150 lb)
- Cruise speed: 657 km/h (408 mph, 355 kn) at 10,670 m (35,010 ft) at 35,450 kg (78,150 lb)
- Range: 3,353 km (2,083 mi, 1,810 nmi) with max fuel & 2,300 kg (5,100 lb) payload
- Service ceiling: 11,580 m (37,990 ft)
- Rate of climb: 17.75 m/s (3,494 ft/min) at sea level
- Wing loading: 321.2 kg/m^{2} (65.8 lb/sq ft)
- Thrust/weight: 0.003 kN/kg (0.34 lbf/lb)

== See also ==
Aircraft of comparable role, configuration, and era

- Antonov An-72
- Boeing C-17 Globemaster III
- McDonnell Douglas YC-15

Related lists

- List of military aircraft of Japan
