= JS Fuyuzuki =

Destroyer of the Japan Maritime Self-Defense Force

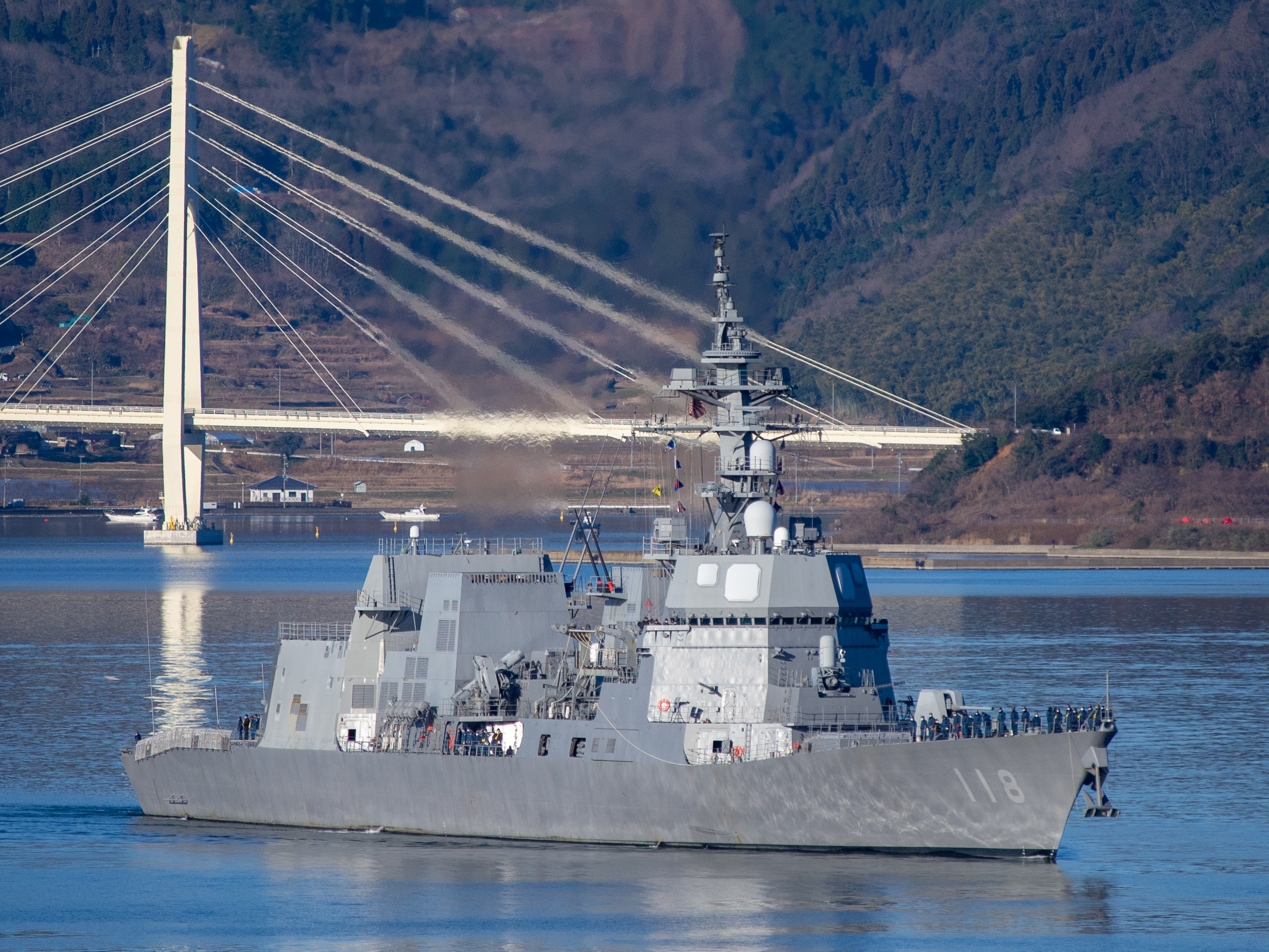
- JS Fuyuzuki on 11 January 2023.

History

Japan
- Name: Fuyuzuki; (ふゆづき)
- Namesake: Fuyuzuki (1944)
- Ordered: 2009
- Builder: Mitsui, Tamano
- Laid down: 14 June 2011
- Launched: 22 August 2012
- Commissioned: 13 March 2014
- Home port: Maizuru
- Identification: DD-118
- Status: Active

General characteristics
- Class & type: Akizuki-class destroyer
- Displacement: 5,000 tonnes standard; 6,800 tonnes full load
- Length: 150.5 m (493 ft 9 in)
- Beam: 18.3 m (60 ft 0 in)
- Draft: 5.3 m (17 ft 5 in)
- Depth: 10.9 m (35 ft 9 in)
- Propulsion: COGAG, two shafts, four Rolls-Royce Spey SM1C turbines
- Speed: 30 knots (56 km/h; 35 mph)
- Complement: 200
- Sensors & processing systems: ATECS (advanced technology command system); OYQ-11 ACDS; FCS-3A AAW system; OQQ-22 ASW system; NOLQ-3D EW system; OPS-20C surface search radar
- Armament: 1 × Mk. 45 Mod 4 127 mm (5 in)/54 gun; 8 × Type 90 Anti-ship missile; 2 × 20 mm Phalanx Block1B CIWS; 2 × HOS-303 triple 324 mm (12.8 in) torpedo tubes; Anti-Torpedo system; 32-cell Mk. 41 Vertical Launching System: RIM-162 ESSM SAM; RUM-139 VL-ASROC (DD 115); Type 07 VL-ASROC (DD 116 to DD 118)
- Aircraft carried: 1 × SH-60K helicopter

JS Fuyuzuki (DD-118) is the fourth ship of Akizuki-class destroyers, operated by the Japan Maritime Self-Defense Force. She was commissioned on 13 March 2014.

== Construction and career ==
Fuyuzuki was laid down at Mitsui Engineering & Shipbuilding Tamano Works on 14 June 2011 as the 2009 plan 5,000-ton type escort ship No. 2247 based on the medium-term defense capability development plan, and launched on August 22, 2012.

Commissioned on 13 March 2014, she was transferred to the 7th Escort Corps of the 3rd Escort Corps and deployed to Maizuru.

The construction cost of Fuyuzuki was about 72.6 billion yen, and since she was the first escort ship to be built in 17 years since Harusame at Mitsui Engineering & Shipbuilding, they called on retirees and Mitsubishi Heavy Industries workers to build and decorate the ship.

The predecessor destroyer Fuyutsuki (launched in January 1944) was built at the Maizuru Naval Arsenal, and at the ceremony when she arrived at Maizuru, the captain said Fuyuzuki has returned to Maizuru for the first time in 70 years.

Fuyuzuki participated in the US-India joint maritime training (Malabar 2015) held in the waters east of India from 26 September to 10 November 2015.

From 26 August to 18 October, 2016, she participated in the Australian Navy-sponsored multilateral maritime joint training in the waters around Darwin, Australia.

On 11 October 2016, the 3rd Escort Group was reorganized into the 3rd Escort Corps.

From 26 February to 22 March 2018, she was dispatched to Guam as a 2017 US training, and conducted offshore training in collaboration with the US Navy. From 8 to 14 March, the ship participated in Multi-Sale 2018 and fight against air with the U.S. Navy missile cruiser Antietam, and destroyers Curtis Wilbur, Benfold, and Mustin, conducting anti-water warfare, anti-submarine warfare, shooting training, etc.

From 8 to 16 June of the same year, she participated in the Japan-US-India Joint Training (Malabar 2018) conducted on Guam Island and the sea and airspace around the island. In addition to Fuyuzuki, the participating units were the escort vessels Ise and Suzunami, five onboard aircraft, the submarine Sōryū, and two P-1 patrol aircraft.

In addition, from 16 to 23 June 2018, Fuyuzuki and Suzunami conducted joint cruise training with the US Navy in the sea and airspace from around Guam to the south of Okinawa. From the US Navy, the aircraft carrier Ronald Reagan and several other ships participated.

From 8 to 16 November of the same year, Fuyuzuki joined a joint cruise training with several ships including the US Navy aircraft carriers Ronald Reagan and John C. Stennis in the sea and airspace from the south of Shikoku to the area around Okinawa.

From 24 October to 2 November 2019, Fuyuzuki participated in a Japan-US joint training with the Ronald Reagan and several other ships in the sea and airspace from southern Okinawa to southern Kanto.

== Gallery ==
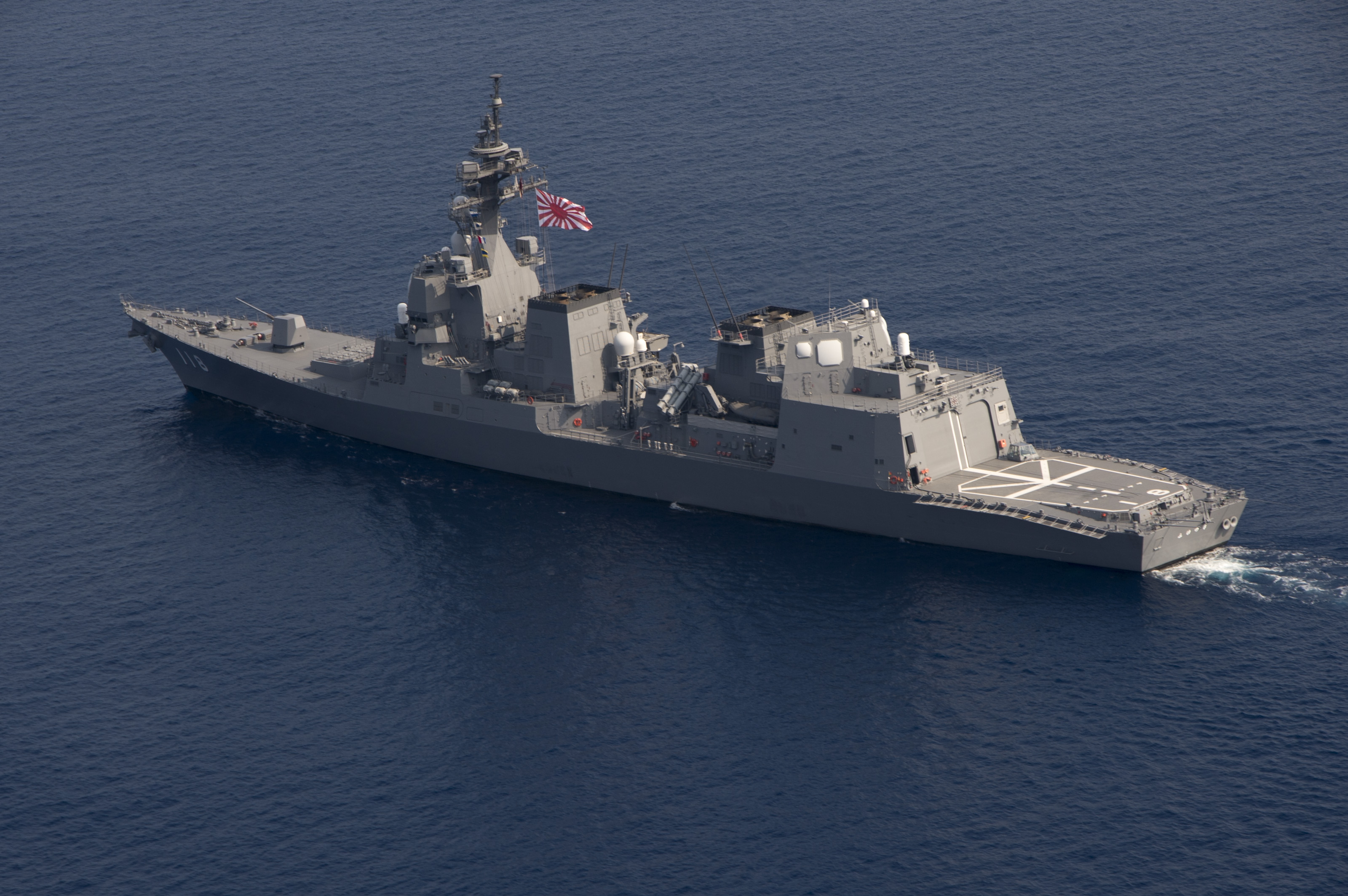
JS Fuyuzuki transits into formation during Exercise Malabar 2015.

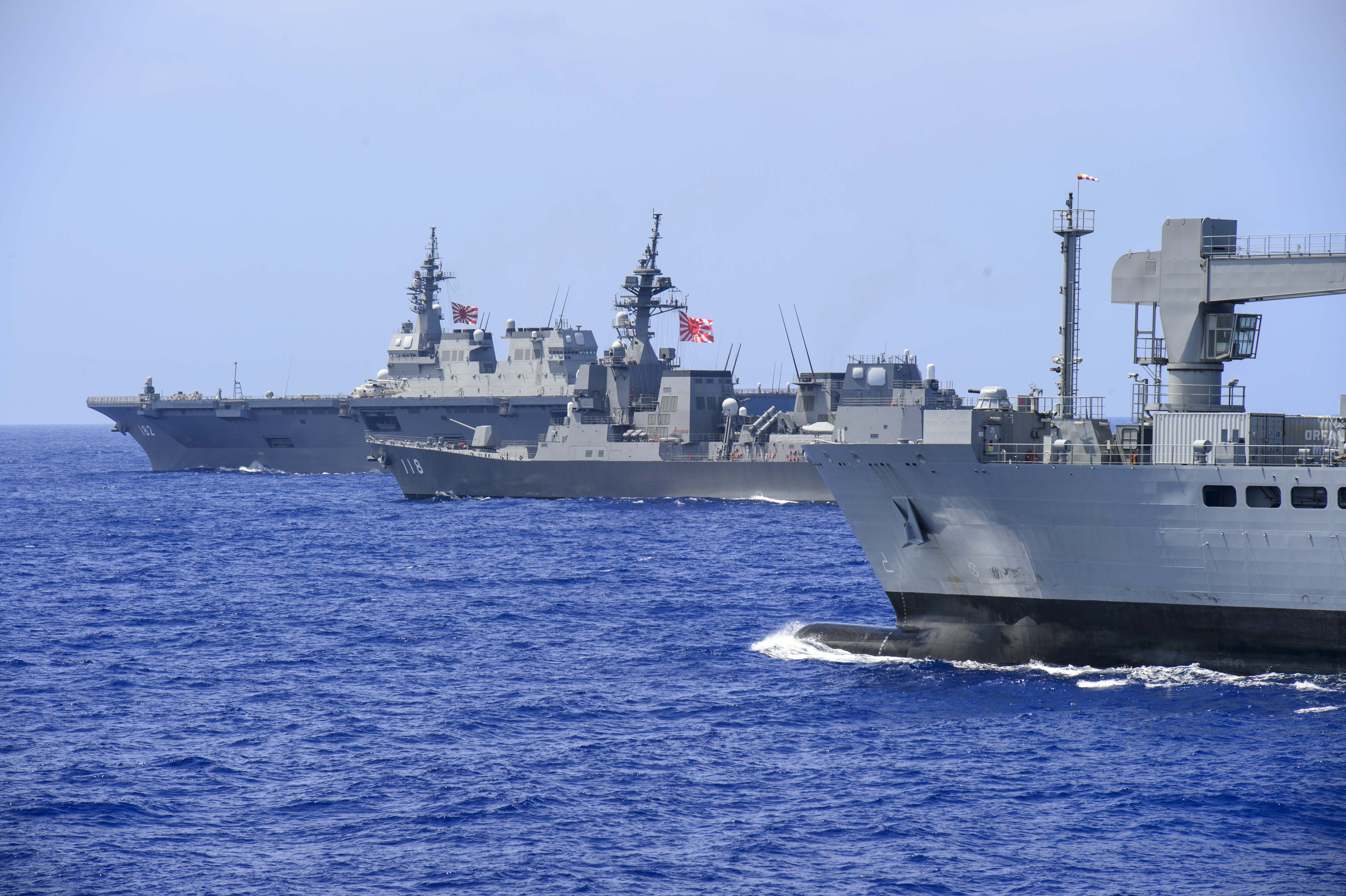
Shakti, Fuyuzuki and Ise during Malabar 2018.

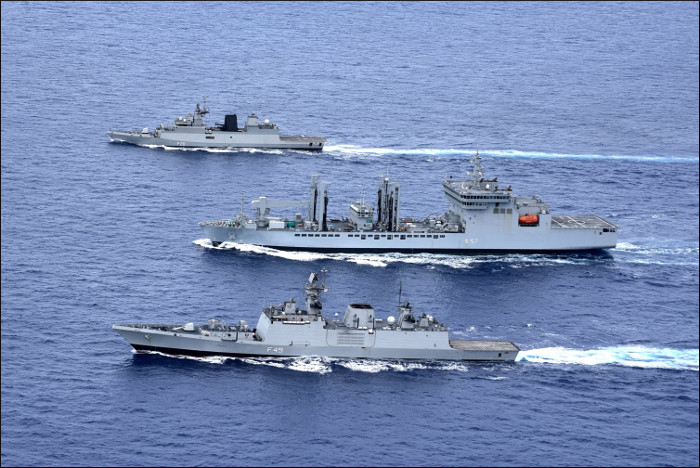
Shakti, Fuyuzuki and Ise during Malabar 2018.

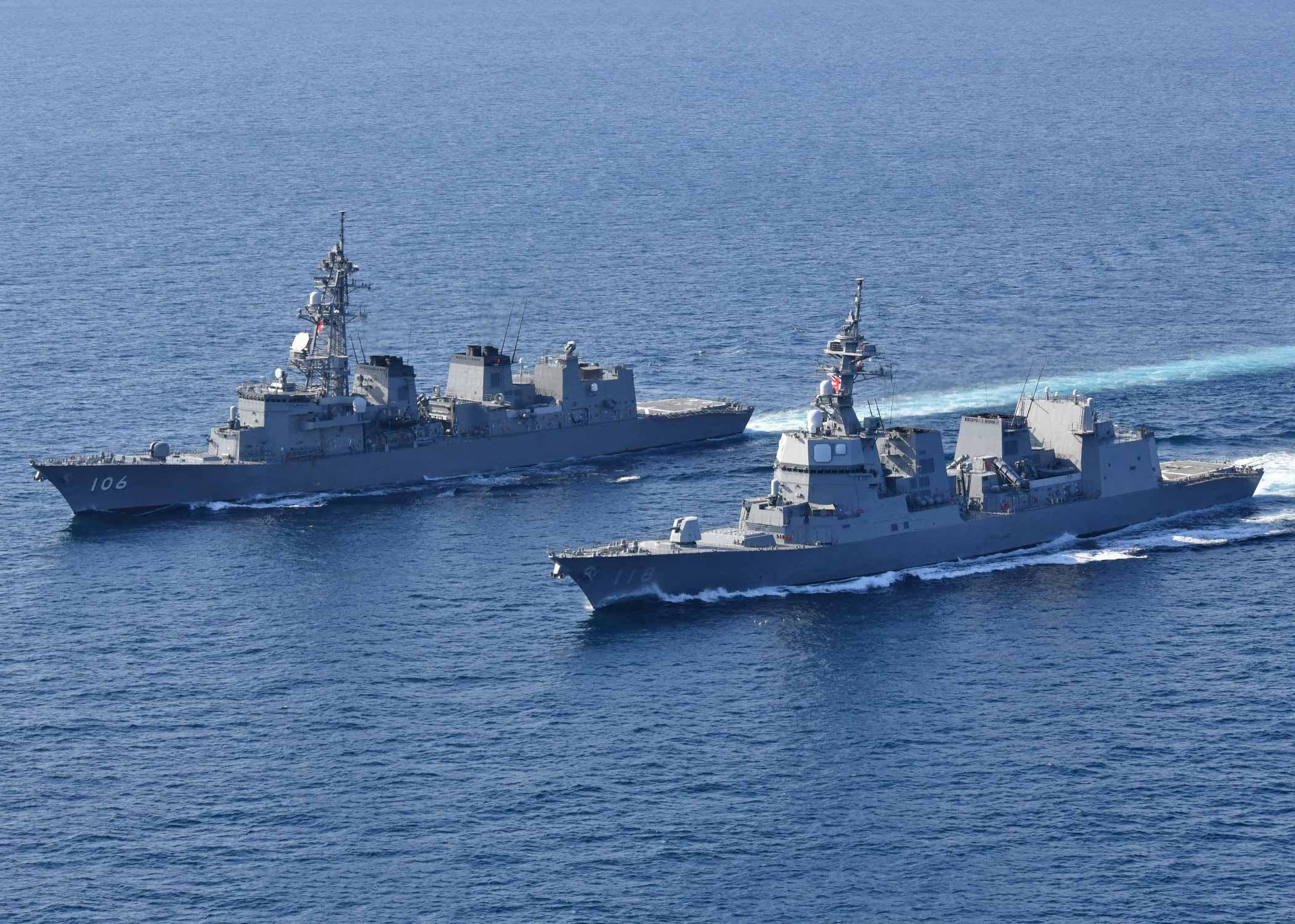
JS Fuyuzuki sails alongside JS Samidare, 1 February 2022.
