= Japanese ship Ise =

At least two warships of Japan have borne the name Ise:

- Japanese battleship Ise, a battleship of the Imperial Japanese Navy, named after the province
- JS Ise (DDH-182), a Japanese helicopter carrier, also named after the province
