= Soryu =

Soryu may refer to:

- Japanese aircraft carrier Sōryū, an Imperial Japanese Navy aircraft carrier scuttled during the Battle of Midway on 4 June 1942
- Sōryū-class submarine, a ship class of Japanese submarines
- JS Sōryū (SS-501), the lead submarine of the Sōryū class of submarines in the Japan Maritime Self-Defense Force
- Asuka Langley Soryu, character from the Neon Genesis Evangelion franchise
