= JS Ise =

Japanese helicopter destroyer

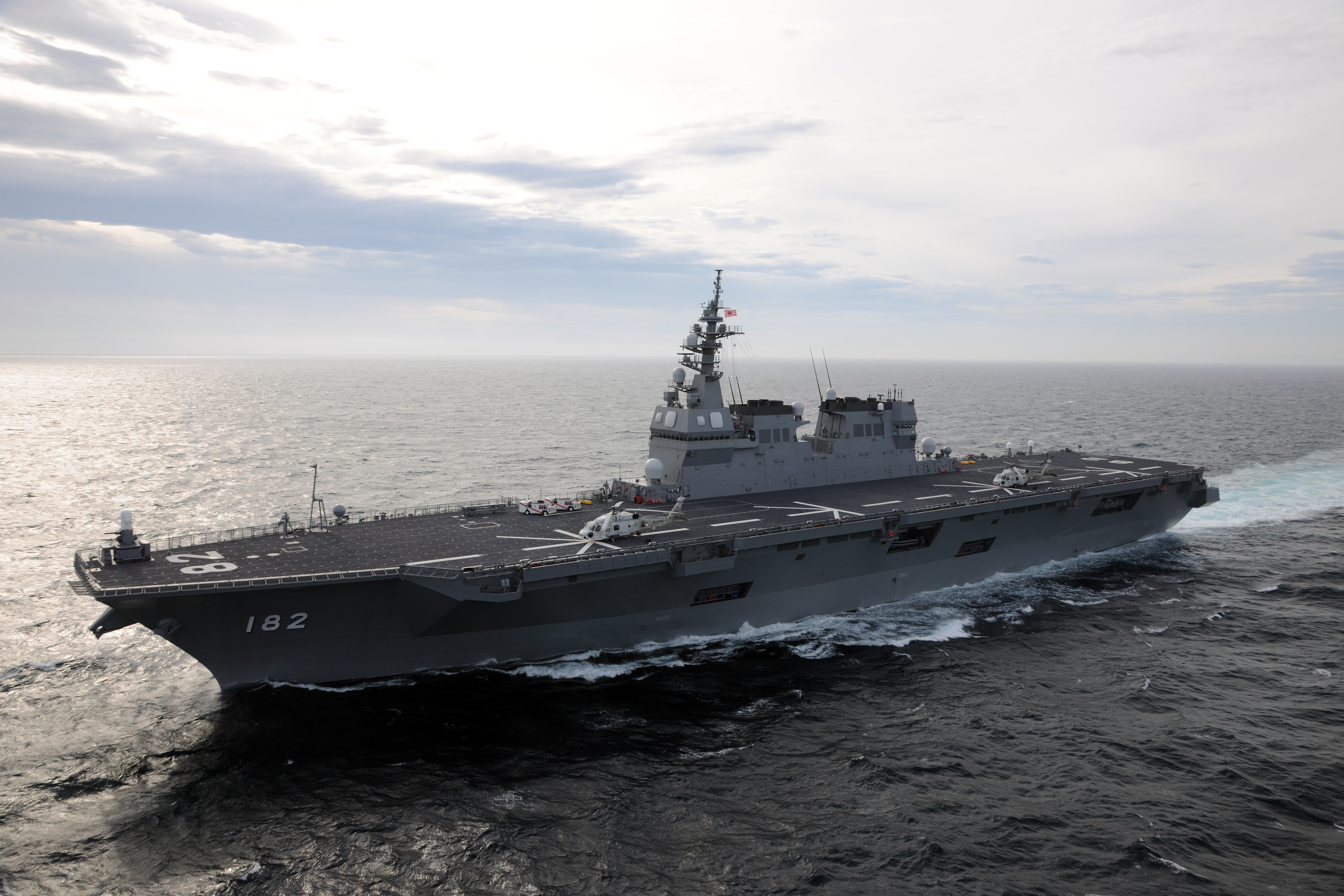
- JS Ise

History

Japan
- Name: Ise; (いせ)
- Namesake: Ise Province
- Ordered: 2006
- Builder: IHI, Yokohama
- Laid down: 30 May 2008
- Launched: 21 August 2009
- Commissioned: 16 March 2011
- Home port: Sasebo
- Identification: MMSI number: 431999551; Pennant number: DDH-182
- Motto: Readiness, Expertness, Integrity
- Status: Active

General characteristics
- Class & type: Hyūga-class helicopter destroyer
- Displacement: 13,950 long tons (14,170 t) standard; 19,000 long tons (19,000 t) full load
- Length: 197 m (646 ft 4 in)
- Beam: 33 m (108 ft 3 in)
- Propulsion: COGAG, two shafts, 100,000 hp (75,000 kW)
- Speed: more than 30 knots (56 km/h; 35 mph)
- Sensors & processing systems: ATECS (advanced technology command system); OYQ-10 advanced combat direction system; FCS-3 AAW system; OQQ-21 ASW system; NOLQ-3C EW system; OPS-20C surface search radar
- Armament: 16 cells Mk 41 VLS; 16 ESSM; 12 RUM-139 VL ASROC; 2 × 20 mm Phalanx CIWS; 2 × triple 324 mm torpedo tubes; 12.7 mm MG
- Aircraft carried: 3 × SH-60K, 1 × MCH-101; 18 aircraft V/STOL maximum
- Aviation facilities: Flight deck and enclosed hangar

JS Ise (DDH-182) is a Hyūga-class helicopter destroyer of the Japan Maritime Self-Defense Force (JMSDF). She is the second ship to be named Ise, the first being the Imperial Japanese Navy World War II-era battleship Ise.

== Development and design ==
They are sometimes referred to as an aircraft carrier (helicopter carrier) from the ship's type of flight deck, but officially follows the predecessor Haruna-class destroyer, and as they are also a helicopter destroyer. In addition to advanced command and control capabilities, the ship itself has powerful anti-submarine and anti-aircraft combat capabilities due to the vertical launch system that can launch anti-submarine and anti-aircraft missiles and the newly developed C4ISTAR system. Instead, the function as an escort ship that can perform anti-submarine warfare with its own equipment is also emphasized. This point is one of the features that is significantly different from the Izumo-class helicopter destroyer, which specializes in on-board helicopter operation, with only the minimum weapons for self-defense (two each for close-range air defense missiles and high-performance 20 mm machine guns).

They have the ability to operate a large number of helicopters at the same time due to its vast full deck and large hull volume. As a result, it has superior zone anti-submarine warfare capability than conventional helicopter-equipped destroyers, and can also handle transport helicopters and rescue helicopters. Respond to various missions such as support.

Since the hull size is larger than some conventional light aircraft carriers and amphibious assault ships, it may be compared with light aircraft carriers that operate STOVL aircraft such as the F-35 and Harrier. However, the Japanese Ministry of Defense has not announced the operation of fixed-wing aircraft in the model, and Yoji Koda, a former fleet commander of the JMSDF, states that the ship is completely different in nature from an aircraft carrier.

== Construction and career ==
The vessel was laid down on 30 May 2008 and launched on 21 August 2009 by IHI Marine United at Yokohama and her first sea trial started on July 20, 2010. She was commissioned into service on 16 March 2011. She was transferred to the 4th Escort Group 4th Escort Corps. Her home port is Kure. Her name plate was made by Naotake Takatsuka, Ise Jingu Omiyaji, and her wood was the zelkova used for Uji Bridge.

She assisted in post-Typhoon Haiyan disaster relief efforts in the Philippines as part of the JSDF's in November 2013. Ise participated in RIMPAC alongside the JS Kirishima from June 26 to August 1, 2014. Ise docked in the Philippines on April 26, 2016 for a four-day goodwill visit.

On March 22, 2017, due to the reorganization of the second Izumo-class helicopter destroyer JS Kaga, she was transferred to the 2nd Escort Group, and the fixed port was transferred to Sasebo. From September 11 to 28 of the same year, she participated in joint training, along with JS Akebono and JS Sazanami, with the USS Ronald Reagan and the Aegis ships of the US Navy in the waters south of the Japanese archipelago. On November 12, the same year, she conducted joint US-Japan training with several ships including USS Ronald Reagan, USS Nimitz, and USS Theodore Roosevelt, along with JS Inazuma and JS Makinami in the Sea of Japan.

From March 11 to 23, 2018, Japan-US joint cruising training was conducted with several ships including the USS Carl Vinson in the sea and airspace from the northern part of the South China Sea to the area around Okinawa. From June 8 to June 16 of the same year, she participated in the Japan-US-India Joint Training (MALABAR 2018) conducted on Guam Island and the sea and airspace around the island. In addition to Ise, the participating units include JS Fuyuzuki and JS Suzunami, five onboard aircraft, JS Soryu, and two P-1 patrol aircraft. Ise continued to participate in the RIMPAC 2018, which were held from June 27 to August 2. On September 22, she arrived at Karatsu Port for the first time in five years. The welcome ceremony was attended by officials such as the local mayor. On December 1, Ise sailed south of Yakushima, Kagoshima Prefecture, in search of a man in his forties who fell into the sea from the JS Kongō the day before. Around 4 am on the 1st, the crew of Ise discovered him drifting about 50 km south of Yakushima, clinging to a drifting object such as a cooler box, and were able to rescue him.

She was placed under the command of the Mine Warfare Force commander during training with the U.S. military (Talisman Saber 19), which was conducted from June 3 to August 21, 2019 at the Shoalwater Bay Exercise Area in Queensland, Australia and the surrounding waters. In addition, JS Kunisaki and the Amphibious Rapid Deployment Brigade and the 1st Helicopter Corps from the Ground Self-Defense Force participated in joint landing and land combat between Japan and the United States, joint cruise training, etc.

Ise alongside JS Ashigara took part in RIMPAC exercise in the waters near Hawaii from August 17 to 30 of 2020. Both ships arrived two weeks before the start of the exercise. In September 2023, the first landings by Ground Self Defence Force (JGSDF) V-22 aircraft were conducted on the helicopter carrier. The landings were part of efforts to strengthen inter-operability and create the JGSDF's Amphibious Rapid Deployment Brigade for the purpose of better defending Japan's southern Nansei Islands.

== Gallery ==
JS Ise

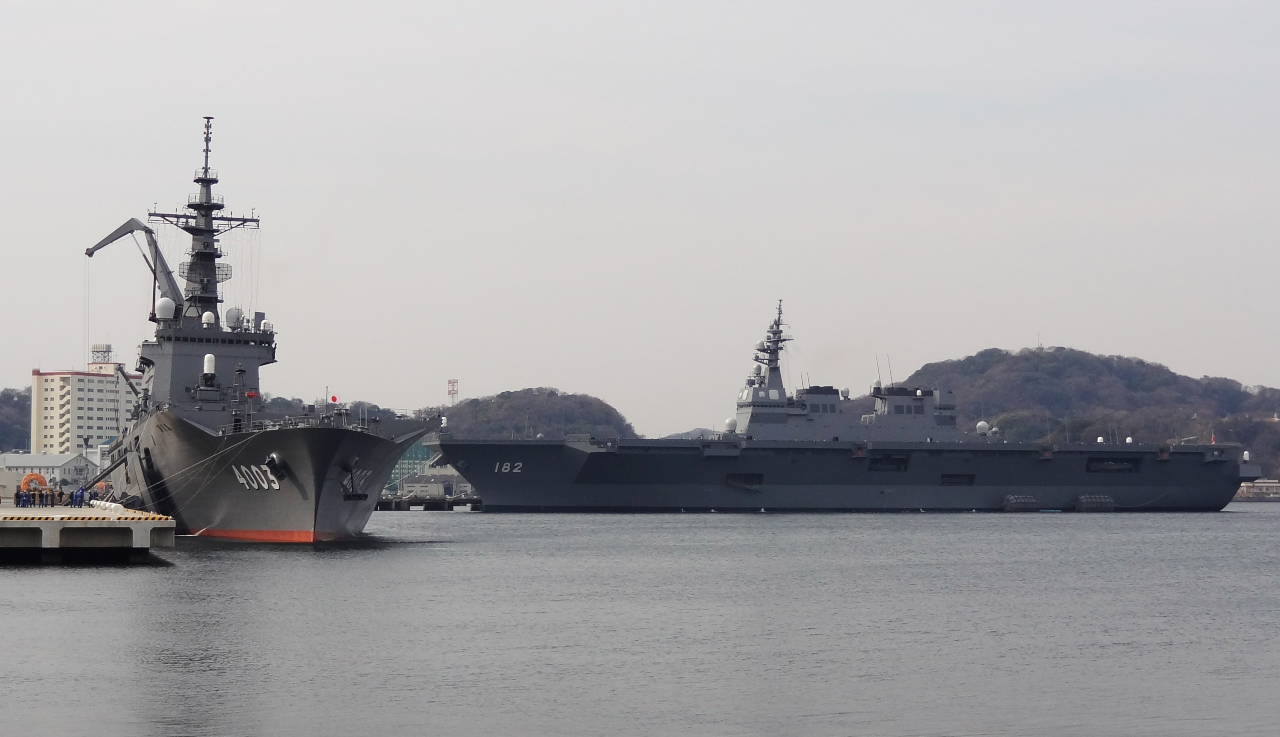
JS Ise and JS Kunisaki at Yokosuka on 20 March 2011.

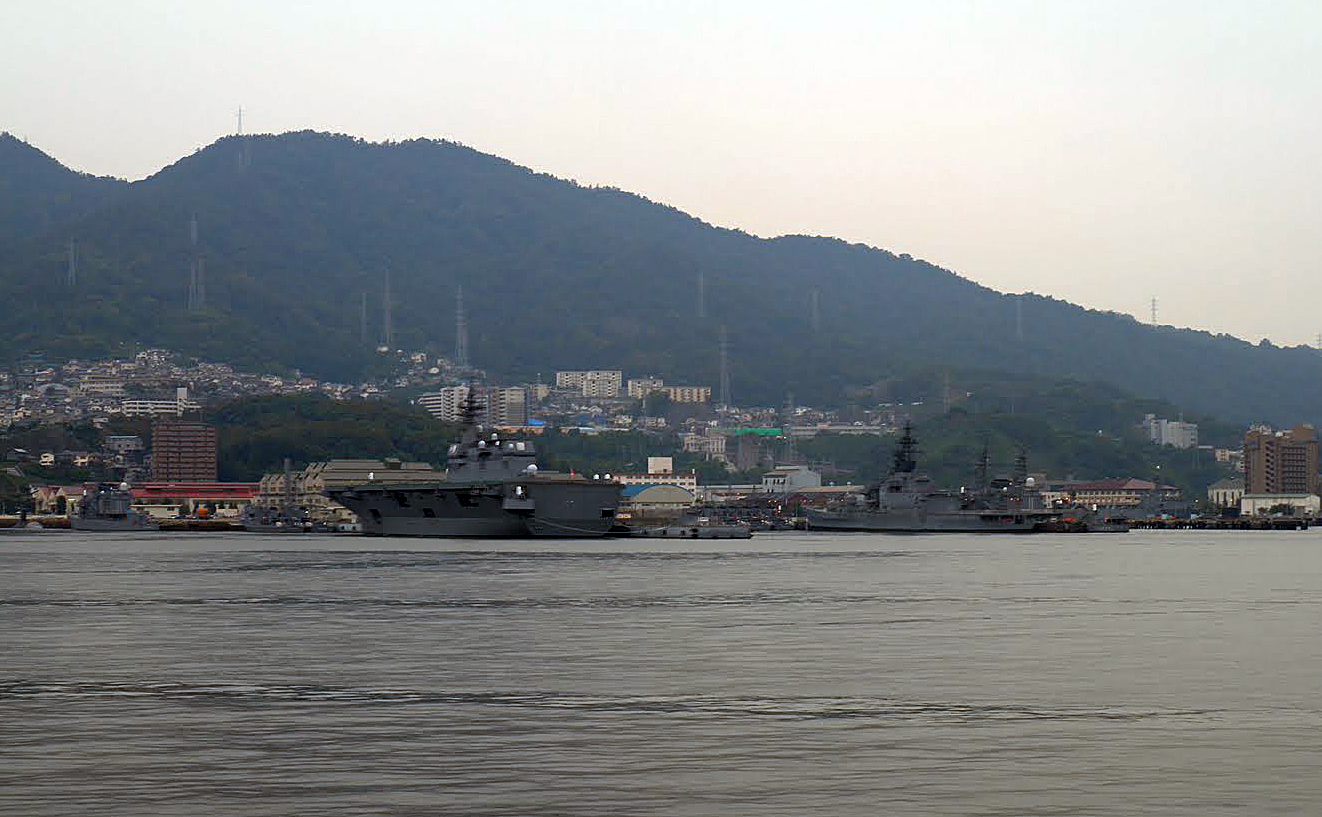
JS Ise at Kure Naval Base on 29 October 2011.

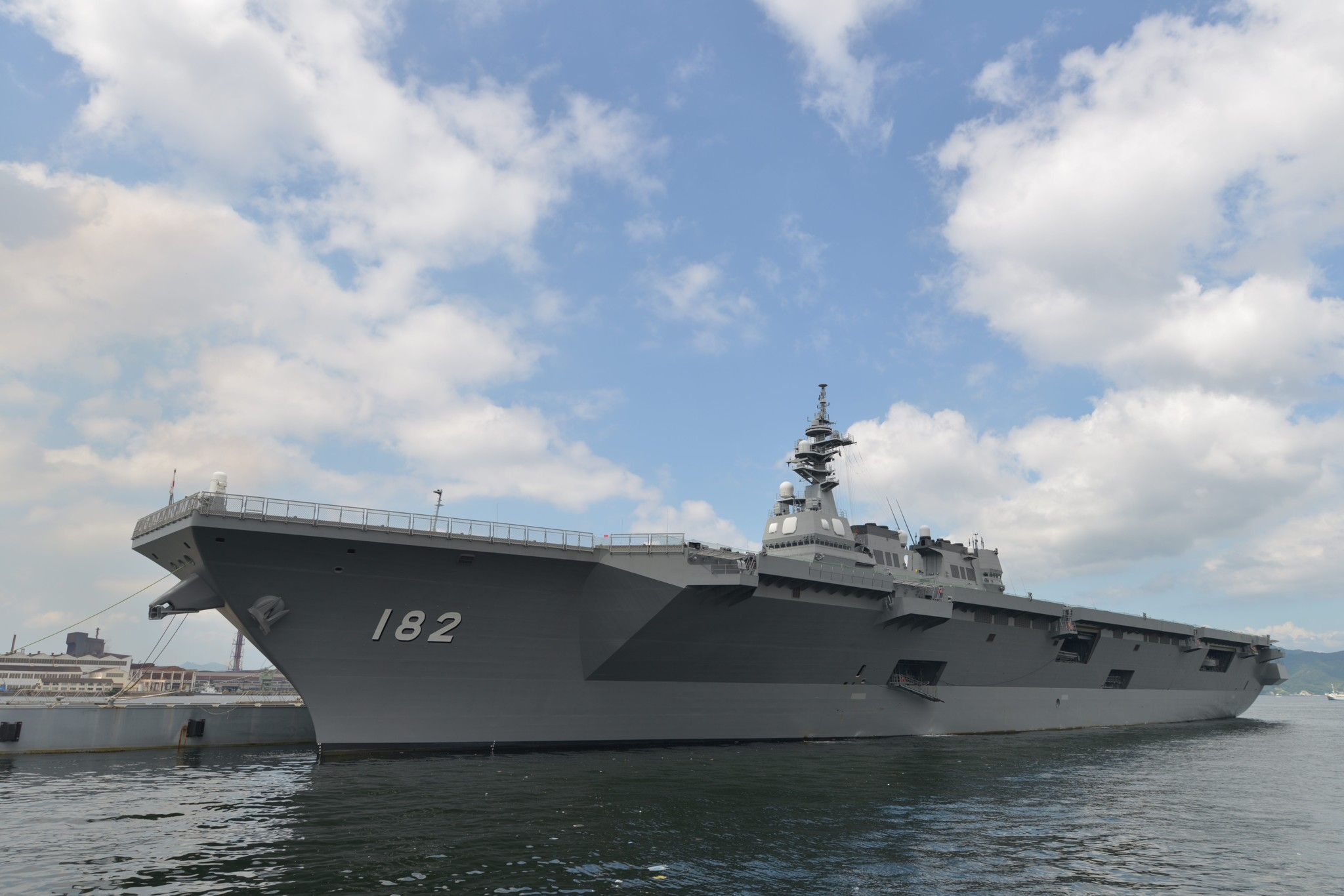
JS Ise in Kure on 20 August 2014.

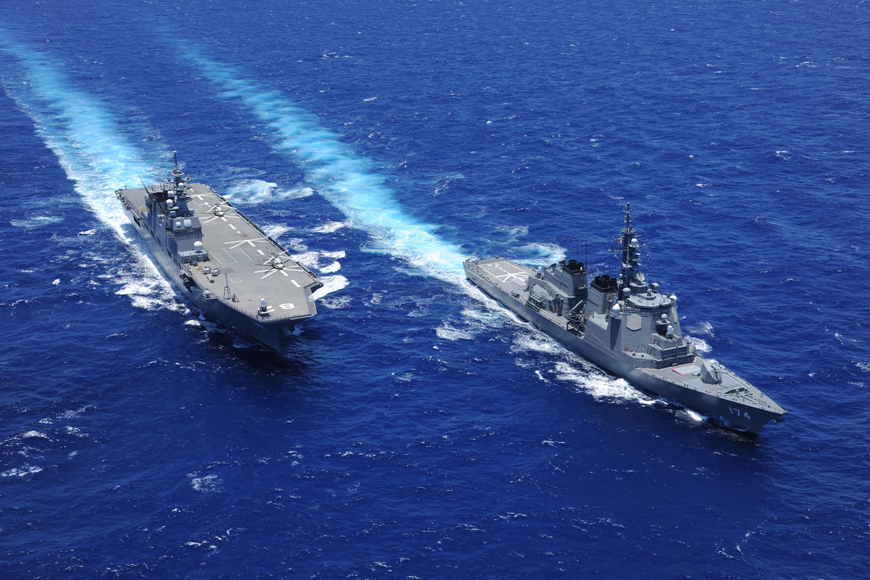
JS Ise alongside JS Kirishima on 28 September 2014.

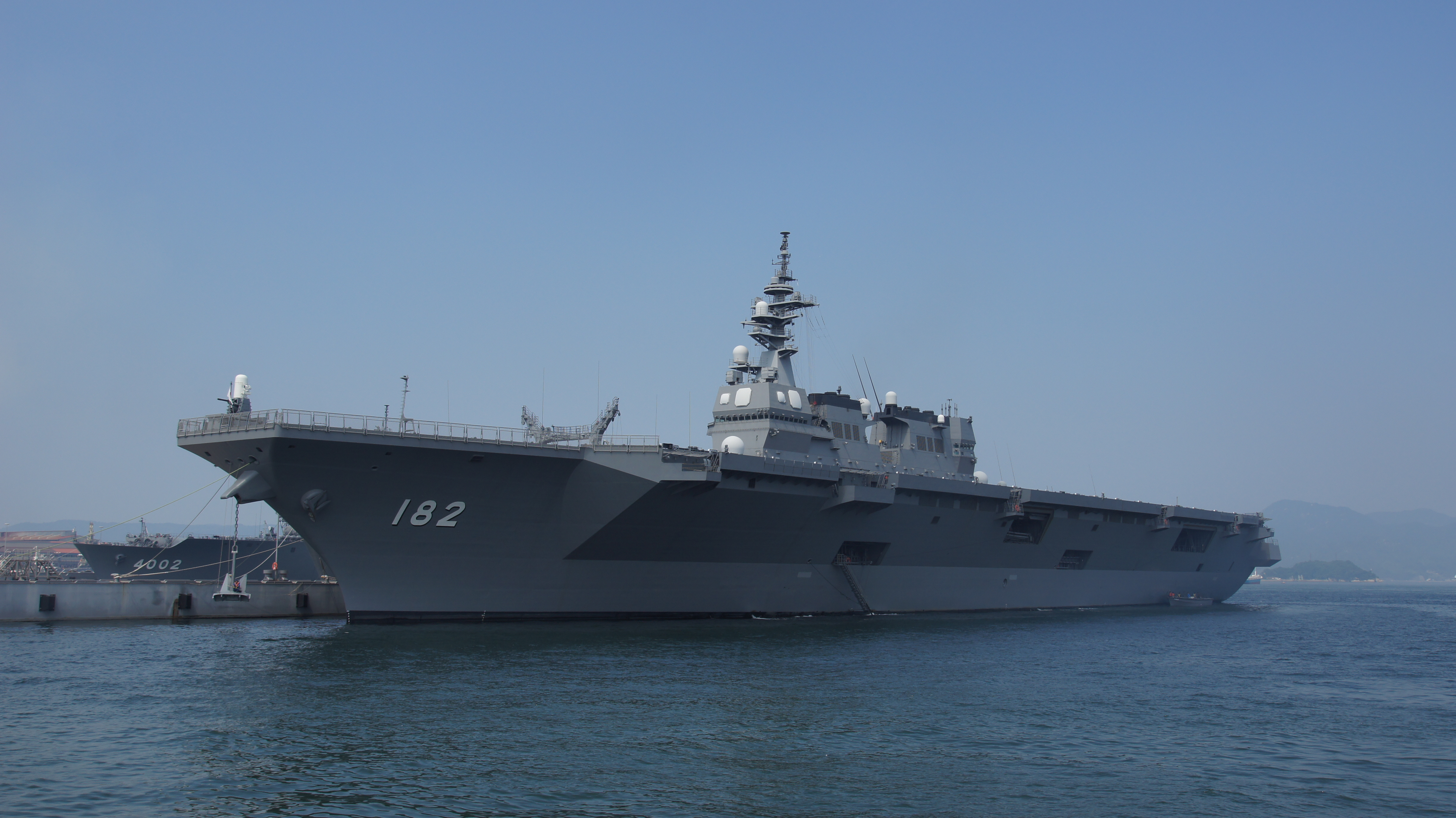
JS Ise on 4 August 2015.

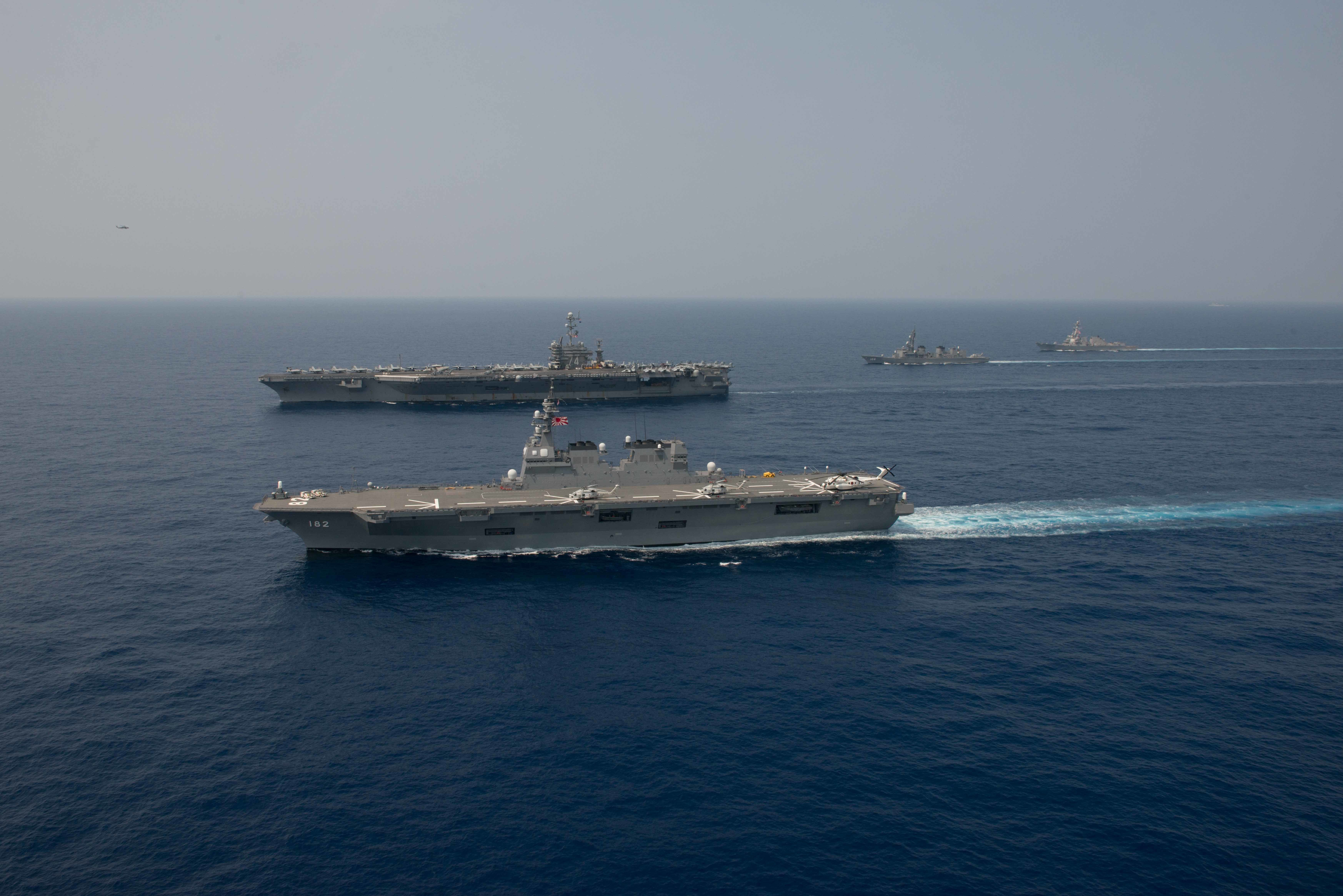
JS Ise and USS John C. Stennis on 29 March 2016.

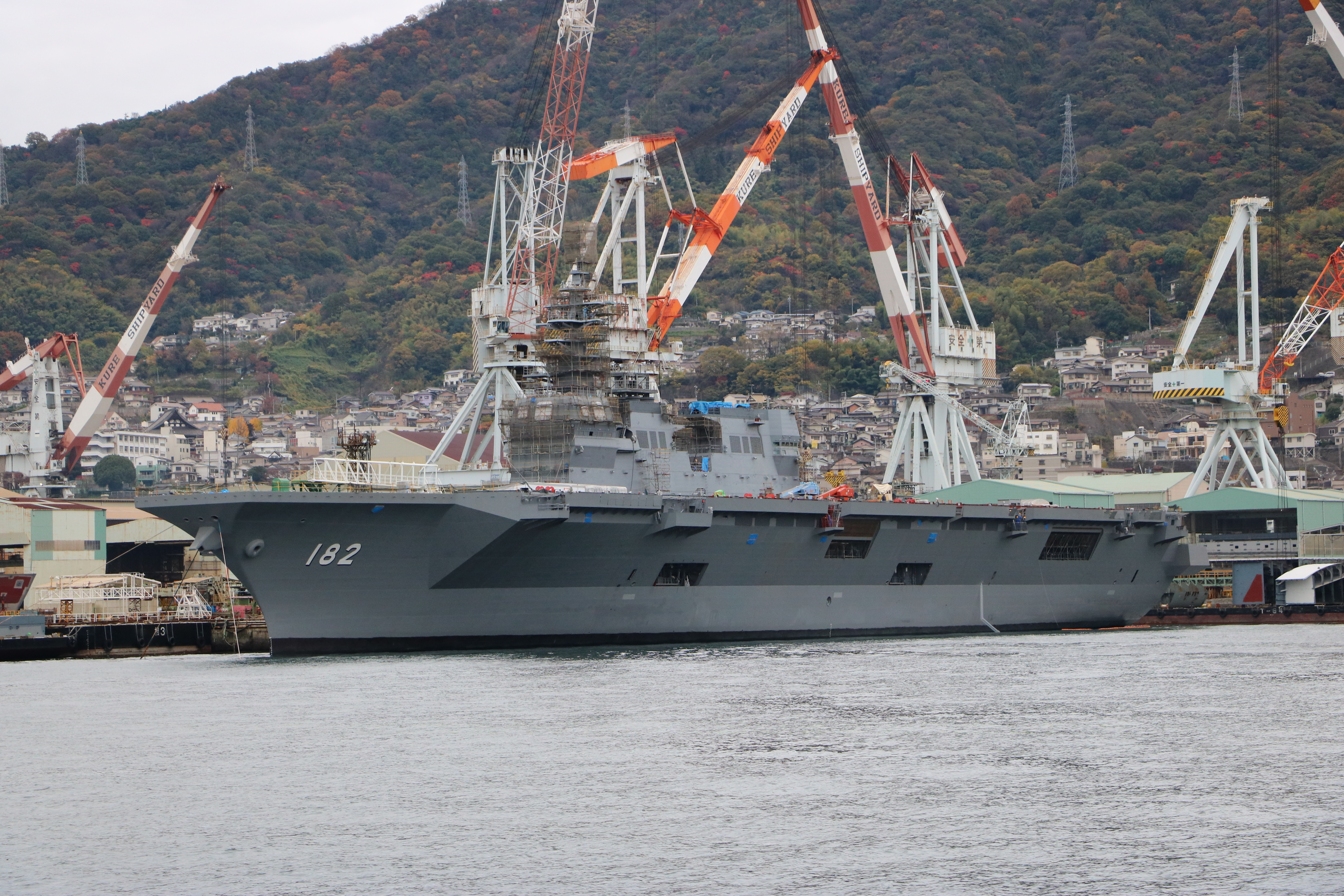
JS Ise at Kure Naval Base in November 2016.

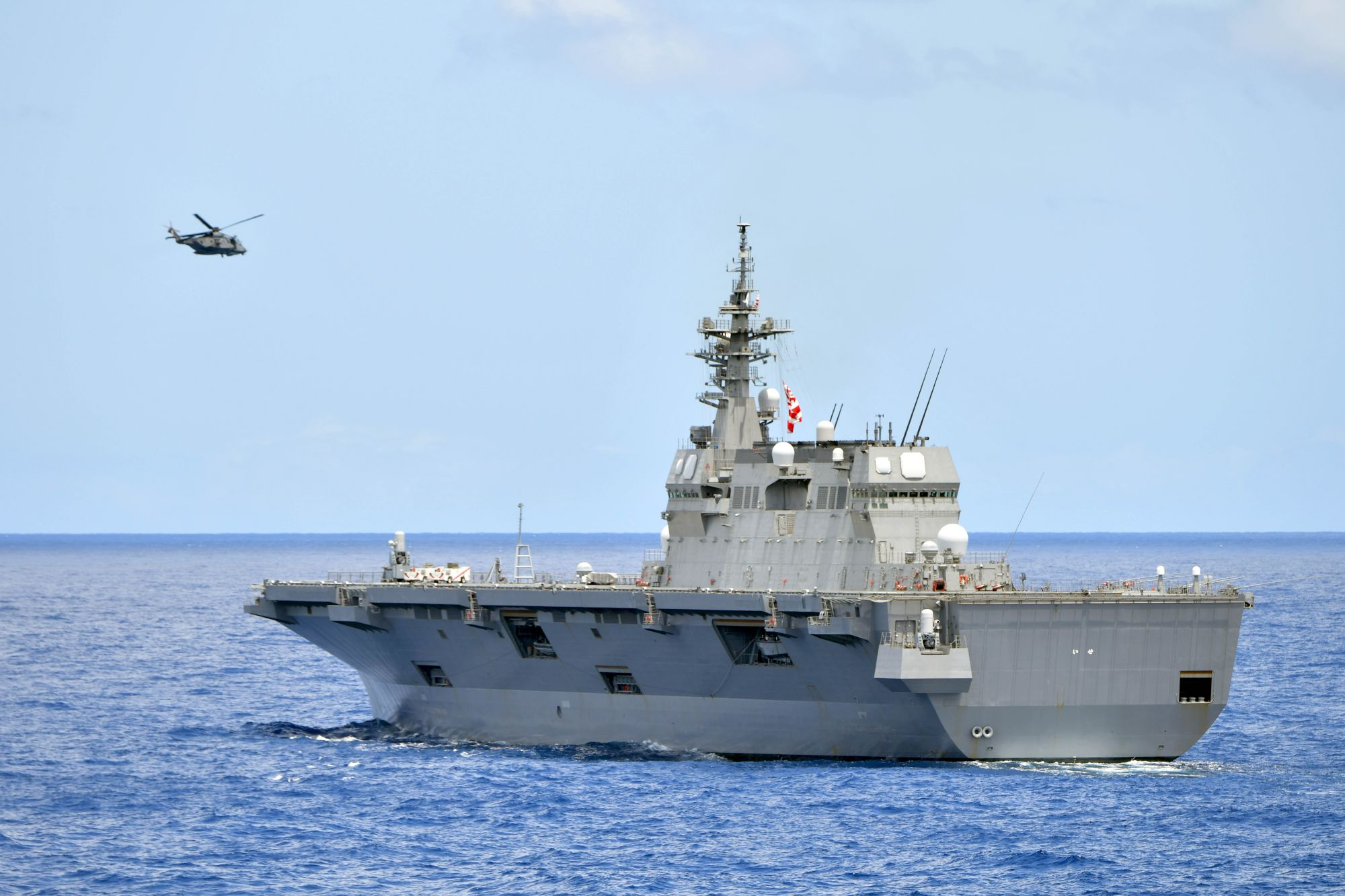
JS Ise during RIMPAC 2020.

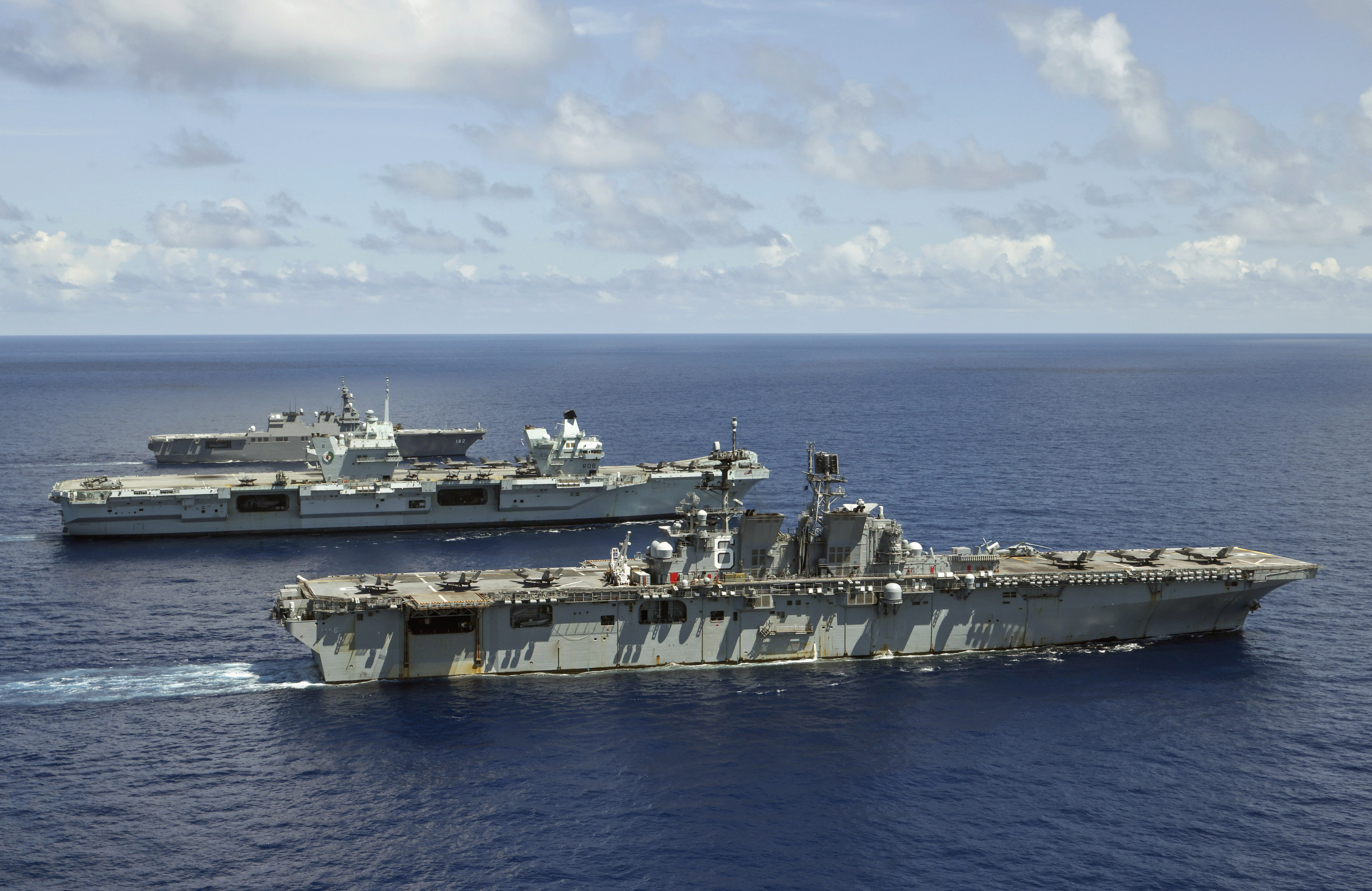
JS Ise alongside USS America and HMS Queen Elizabeth on 24 August 2021.
