= Japanese ship Sōryū =

At least two warships of Japan have been named Sōryū:

- Japanese aircraft carrier Sōryū, an aircraft carrier launched in 1935 and sunk in 1942.
- JS Sōryū (SS-501), a Sōryū-class submarine launched in 2007.
