= JMSDF Tateyama Air Base =

Airbase in Chiba Prefecture, Japan

JMSDF Tateyama Air Base 館山航空基地
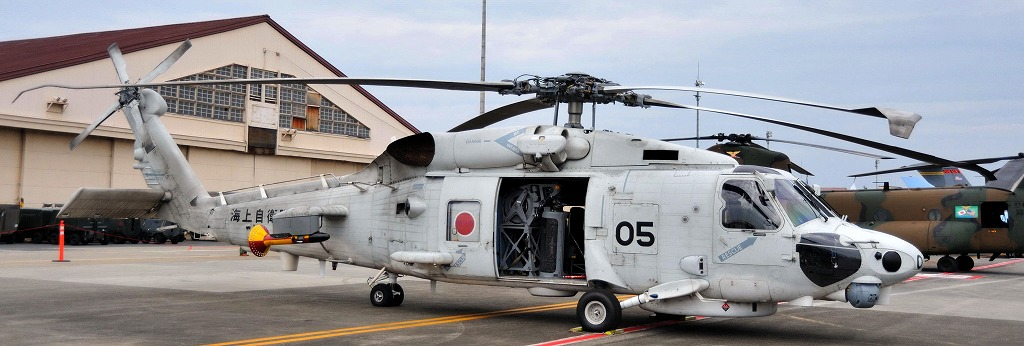
- IATA: none; ICAO: RJTE

Summary
- Airport type: Military
- Operator: Japan Maritime Self-Defense Force
- Location: Tateyama, Chiba, Japan
- Elevation AMSL: 10 ft / 3 m
- Coordinates: 34°59′15″N 139°49′55″E

Map
- Location in Japan

Runways
Direction	Length		Surface
Direction	m	ft	Surface
09/27	300	984	asphalt
- Source: Japanese AIP at AIS Japan

JMSDF Tateyama Air Base (館山航空基地, Tateyama Kōkūkichi) (ICAO: RJTE) is a military aerodrome of the Japan Maritime Self-Defense Force. It is located outside the city of Tateyama in Chiba Prefecture, Japan, at the southern tip of the Bōsō Peninsula.It also has a shorter runway because the airbase is only used for helicopters and planes only fly to Kisarazu airfield which is the only base nearby

== Operations ==
JMSDF Tateyama Air Base is currently the headquarters of the 21st Fleet Air Squadron, with two squadrons equipped with Mitsubishi SH-60J/K helicopters optimized for anti-submarine warfare, and one flight of three Mitsubishi UH-60J helicopters which provide air ambulance services to the Izu Islands.

== History ==
JMSDF Tateyama Air Base was initially founded in 1930 for the Imperial Japanese Navy Air Service. It was part of the Yokosuka Naval District, and home to the Tateyama Naval Air Group, equipped with Mitsubishi G3M bombers, Mitsubishi A5M fighters, Nakajima B5N torpedo bombers and the Kyūshū Q1W anti-submarine patrol aircraft. The artillery school for the Imperial Japanese Navy Land Forces was at Tateyama. Due to its location, it was regarded as a strategic site for the defense of the entrance to Tokyo Bay, and was a base for kamikaze attack aircraft towards the end of the Pacific War.

After the surrender of Japan at the end of World War II, the air field was occupied by the United States Army First Cavalry Division. It was returned to the Japanese government in 1953, and assigned to the Japanese Safety Security Force, the immediate predecessor to the JMSDF. Tateyama was rebuilt into the largest heliport in Japan under the Japan Maritime Self-Defense Force (JMSDF), supporting rotary wing operations in other locations around Japan, including Haneda airport, JMSDF Ōminato Air Base, JMSDF Maizuru Naval Air Base and Iwo Jima. The JMSDF Fleet Air Wing 21 has been headquartered at Tateyama since 1961.
