= 22nd Fleet Air Squadron (JMSDF) =

Fleet Air Squadron 21 (HS-21)
- 第21航空隊
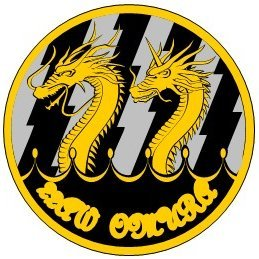
- Active: 26 March 2008
- Country: Japan
- Branch: Japan Maritime Self-Defense Force
- Part of: Fleet Air Force, Fleet Air Wing 21
- Garrison/HQ: Omura Air Base

Aircraft flown
- Helicopter: SH-60J & SH-60K

Fleet Air Squadron 22 (第22航空隊, dainijuunikoukuutai) (which is also referred to as HS-22) is a unit in the Japanese Maritime Self-Defence Force. It is a part of the Fleet Air Force and comes under the authority of Fleet Air Wing 21. Equipped with Mitsubishi SH-60J & SH-60K anti-submarine warfare helicopters, it is based at Omura Air Base in Nagasaki Prefecture.

== Squadron structure ==
The squadron is composed of three flights:

- 221st Flight is equipped with SH-60K helicopters
- 222nd flight is equipped with SH-60K helicopters
- 223rd Flight is equipped with SH-60J helicopters
