= JS Sōryū =

2007 Sōryū-class submarine

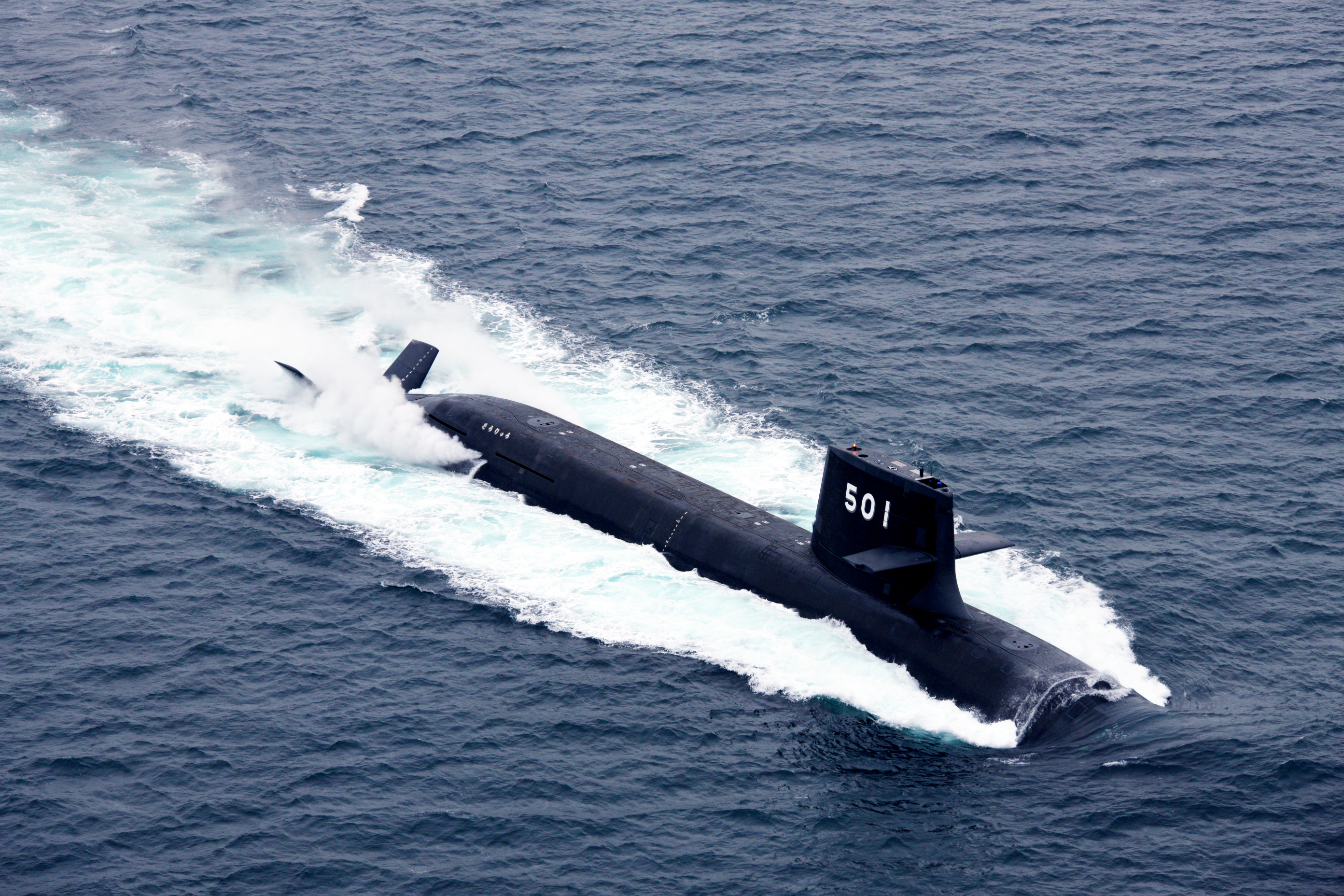
- JS Sōryū

History

Japan
- Name: Sōryū; (そうりゅう)
- Ordered: 2004
- Builder: Mitsubishi Heavy Industries
- Cost: ¥64.3 billion
- Laid down: 31 March 2005
- Launched: 5 December 2007
- Commissioned: 30 March 2009
- Home port: Kure
- Identification: SS-501
- Status: Active

General characteristics
- Class & type: Sōryū-class attack submarine
- Displacement: Surfaced: 2,900 tonnes (2,854 long tons); Submerged: 4,200 t (4,134 long tons)
- Length: 84.0 m (275 ft 7 in)
- Beam: 9.1 m (29 ft 10 in)
- Draught: 8.5 m (27 ft 11 in)
- Propulsion: 1-shaft 2× Kawasaki 12V 25/25 SB-type diesel engines diesel-electric; 4× Kawasaki Kockums V4-275R Stirling engines; 3,900 hp (2,900 kW) surfaced; 8,000 hp (6,000 kW) submerged
- Speed: Surfaced: 13 kn (24 km/h; 15 mph); Submerged: 20 kn (37 km/h; 23 mph)
- Range: AIP endurance (est.): 6,100 nautical miles (11,300 km; 7,000 mi) at 6.5 knots (12.0 km/h; 7.5 mph)
- Complement: 65 (9 officers, 56 enlisted)
- Sensors & processing systems: ZPS-6F surface/low-level air search radar; Hughes/Oki ZQQ-7 Sonar suite: 1× bow-array, 4× LF flank arrays and 1× Towed array sonar
- Electronic warfare & decoys: ZLR-3-6 ESM equipment; 2× 3-inch underwater countermeasure launcher tubes for launching of Acoustic Device Countermeasures (ADCs)
- Armament: 6 × HU-606 21 in (533 mm) torpedo tubes with 30 reloads for: 1.) Type 89 torpedo; 2.) Harpoon (missile); Mines

JS Sōryū (SS-501) is the first boat of the Sōryū-class submarines. She was commissioned on 30 March 2009.

== Operational history ==
Sōryū was laid down at Mitsubishi Heavy Industries Kobe Shipyard on 31 March 2005 as the 2900-ton submarine No. 8116, based on the medium-term defense capability development that was planned in 2004. At the launching ceremony on 5 December 2007, she was named Sōryū and launched, subsequently deploying to Kure.

After leaving Yura Port for confirmation operation after regular inspection before 7:00 am on 8 October 2012, Sōryū began diving, starting at 8:47 am. At around 2:18 pm, a petty officer disappeared on duty during the dive. When the Sōryū surfaced and a search was conducted, he was found to be in the flooded area inside the bridge sail. The Accident Investigation Commission concluded that the seaman killed himself.

On 2 September 2013, while the Sōryū was anchored at Kure base, an officer attempted to kill himself in his quarters, using a pistol taken from the boat's weapons locker. Although he survived the suicide attempt, the officer was left with a serious disability. In 2015, the Maritime Self-Defense Force determined that the cause of the suicide attempt was the assault by a superior officer, and took disciplinary action by suspending the senior officer and those who had tolerated the assault. However, it was reported in various media on 12 January 2016 that the JMSDF had not announced the disposition of their investigation because of ongoing discussions. The parents of the disabled officer announced that they filed a lawsuit in the Yamaguchi District Court in January 2016, seeking damages of 30 million yen against the government.

The Sōryū participated in the Japan-US-India Joint Training (Malabar 2018) exercise held on and around Guam Island from 8 to 16 June 2018. Participating units included JS Sōryū, escort vessels JS Ise, JS Suzunami, JS Fuyuzuki, five onboard aircraft, and two P-1 patrol aircraft.

On 8 February 2021, Sōryū collided with commercial bulk carrier Ocean Artemis about 40 kilometres (22 nmi) southeast of Cape Ashizuri, when surfacing during a training exercise. The submarine sustained damage to its communications equipment, conning tower, and diving planes, and three Japanese sailors were injured. The commercial vessel suffered no damage or injuries.
