= JS Suzunami =

Destroyer of the Japan Maritime Self-Defense Force

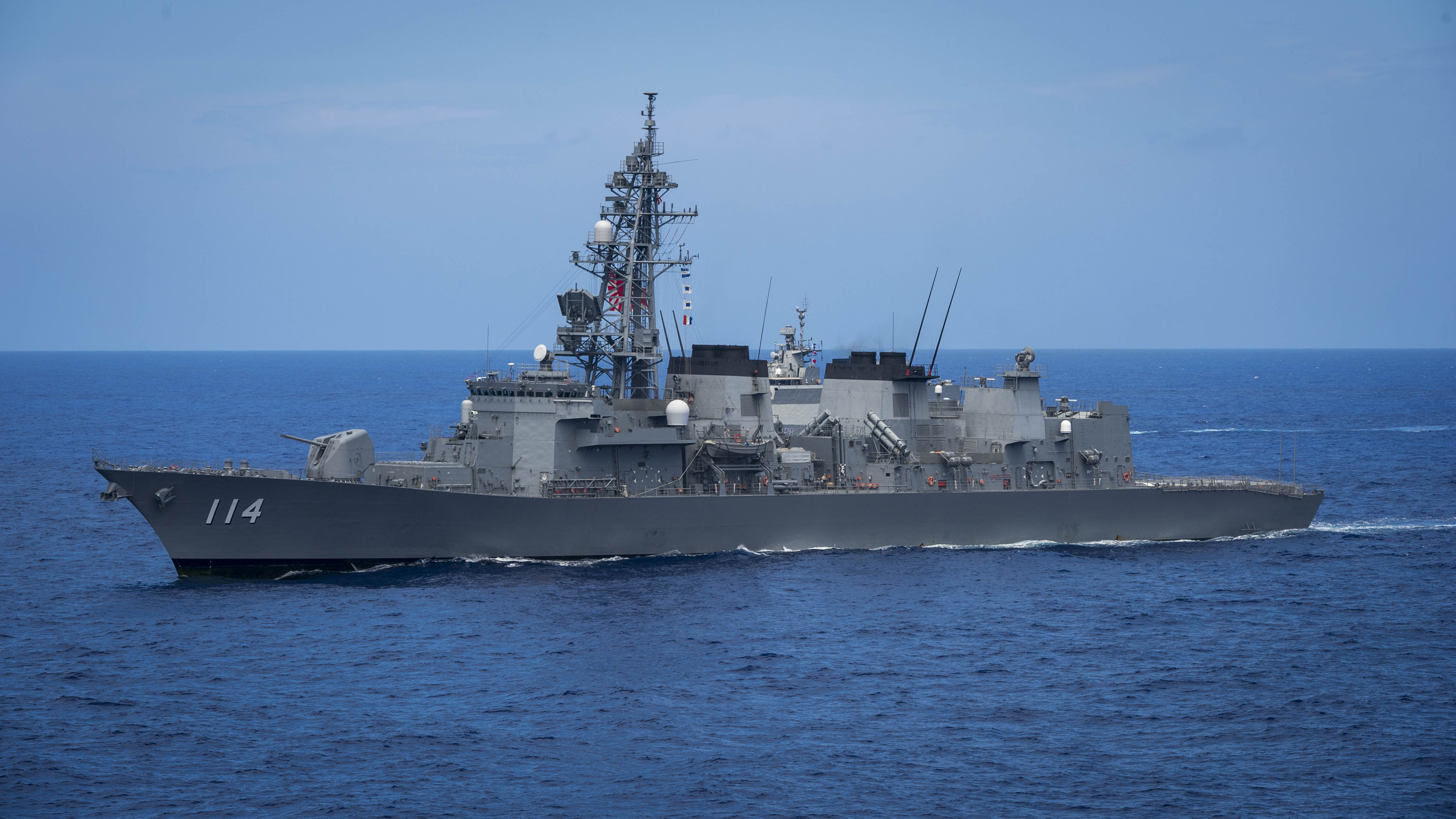
- JS Suzunami underway during Malabar 2018

History

Japan
- Name: Suzunami; (すずなみ)
- Ordered: 2002
- Builder: IHI, Uraga
- Laid down: 24 September 2003
- Launched: 26 August 2004
- Commissioned: 16 February 2006
- Home port: Ōminato
- Identification: MMSI number: 431999684; Pennant number: DD-114
- Status: Active

General characteristics
- Class & type: Takanami-class destroyer
- Displacement: 4,650 long tons (4,725 t) standard 6,300 long tons (6,401 t) full load
- Length: 151 m (495 ft 5 in)
- Beam: 17.4 m (57 ft 1 in)
- Height: 10.9 m (35 ft 9 in)
- Draft: 5.3 m (17 ft 5 in)
- Propulsion: 2 × Ishikawajima Harima LM-2500 gas turbines; 2 × Kawasaki Rolls-Royce Spey SM1C gas turbines; 60,000 shp (45 MW); 2 shafts
- Speed: 30 knots (56 km/h; 35 mph)
- Complement: 175
- Sensors & processing systems: OPS-25B radar; OPS-28D surface search radar; OPS-20 navigational radar; OQS-5 sonar; UQR-2 towed sonar; Type 81 Fire-control system
- Electronic warfare & decoys: NOLQ-3 ECM system; 4 × Mk137 chaff dispensers
- Armament: 1 × Otobreda 127 mm/54 gun; 2 × missile canister up to 8 Type 90 (SSM-1B); 2 × 20 mm Phalanx CIWS; 2 × Type 68 triple torpedo tubes; VLS Mk 41 (32 cells); • Evolved Sea Sparrow SAM; • RUM-139 VL ASROC
- Aircraft carried: 1 × SH-60J(K) anti-submarine helicopter
- Aviation facilities: Hangar and helipad

JS Suzunami (すずなみ) is the fifth vessel of the Takanami-class destroyers of the Japan Maritime Self-Defense Force (JMSDF).

== Design ==
The hull design is generally based on that of the Murasame class. However, when weapon layout was changed, the internal structure was also changed. The large lattice mast was thought to have a negative impact on the stealthiness of the Murasame class, so in Takanami class, a planned change to two smaller masts was conceived, but was not implemented.

Although its displacement become slightly increased, there is no change in its main engines, as it is not a big difference that has little effect on the performance of the ship.

== Construction and career ==
Suzunami was authorized under the Medium-term defense buildup plan of 1996, and was built by IHI Marine United shipyards in Yokohama. She was laid down on 24 September 2003 and launched on 26 August 2004. The destroyer was commissioned into service on 16 February 2006, and was initially assigned to the JMSDF Escort Flotilla 3 based at Maizuru, Kyoto.

Suzunami, along with the fleet oiler Hamana were assigned to the Indian Ocean in March 2007 to provide assistance in refueling anti-terrorist coalition forces in Afghanistan as part of Operation Enduring Freedom. She returned to Japan in July 2007. On 25 March 2008, she was reassigned to the JMSDF Escort Flotilla 1, based at Yokosuka, Kanagawa.

On 21 July 2009, Suzunami, along with the fleet oiler Oumi, was again dispatched for coalition refueling operations in the Indian Ocean. She returned to Japan on the completion of this mission on 24 December 2009. On 8 April 2010, while monitoring a fleet of five People's Liberation Army Navy warships in international waters in the East China Sea, Suzunami was buzzed at abnormally low altitude by a Chinese helicopter. This incident led the Japanese government to file a protest against the Chinese government on 12 April. On 1 August 2011, she was reassigned to the JMSDF Escort Flotilla 3, based at Ōminato, Aomori Prefecture.

On 13 August 2012 Suzunami was dispatched to Aden, Yemen, as part of ongoing anti-piracy escort operations off the coast of Somalia. The context for this extended deployment off the Horn of Africa was the "Law on the Penalization of Acts of Piracy and Measures Against Acts of Piracy (Anti-Piracy Measures Law)". During these deployments, she made a port call at Port Klang, Malaysia from 29 to 30 December.

Suzunami returned to Yokosuka on 10 June 2013 and remains assigned to the Third Squadron of the JMSDF Escort Flotilla 3.
