= Mitsubishi H-60 =

Japanese anti-submarine/utility helicopter

H-60
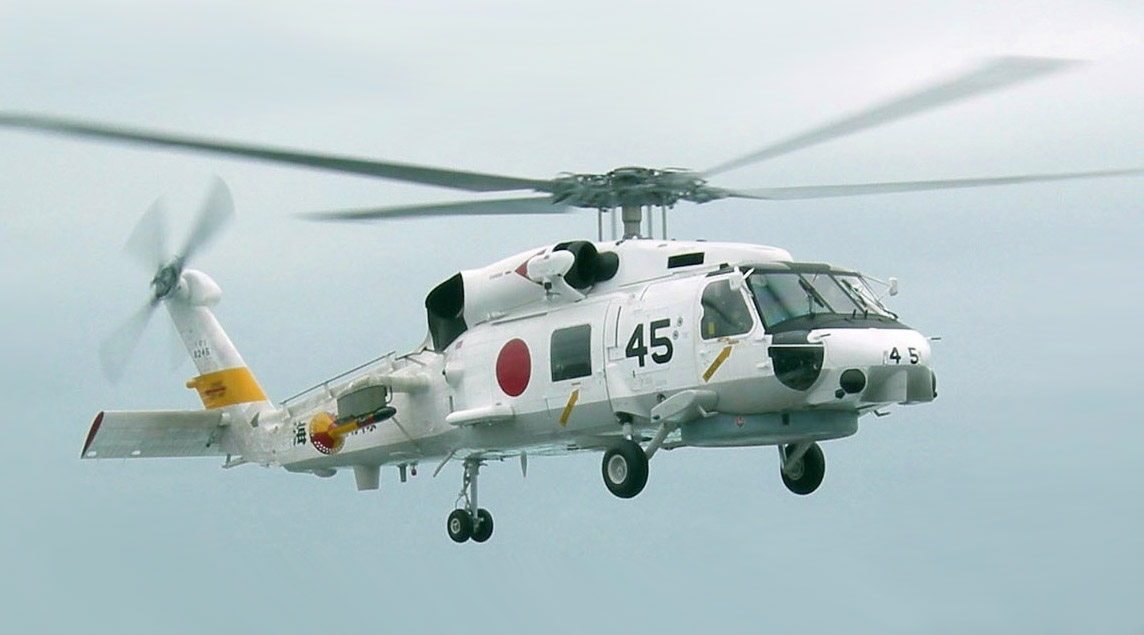
- A JMSDF SH-60J Seahawk helicopter from JDS Haruna lands on board USS Russell in 2007.

General information
- Type: ASW/SAR helicopter
- National origin: Japan; United States
- Manufacturer: Sikorsky Aircraft; Mitsubishi Heavy Industries
- Status: In service
- Primary user: Japan Self-Defense Forces
- Number built: Over 250

History
- Introduction date: 1991
- First flight: 31 August 1987
- Developed from: Sikorsky SH-60 Seahawk; Sikorsky UH-60 Black Hawk

The Mitsubishi H-60 series is a twin-turboshaft engine helicopter based on the Sikorsky UH-60 helicopter family for use by the Japan Self-Defense Forces (JSDF).

The SH-60J/K/L are anti-submarine patrol versions for the Japan Maritime Self-Defense Force (JMSDF). The UH-60J is a search and rescue version for the Japan Air Self-Defense Force (JASDF) and JMSDF. The UH-60JA is a utility version for the Japan Ground Self-Defense Force (JGSDF).

== Design and development ==
=== SH-60J ===
The JMSDF chose S-70B as the successor to the Mitsubishi HSS-2B Sea King (a licence-built version of the Sikorsky Sea King). When the SH-X (later SH-60J) project started, it was immediately after HSS-2B was put into service, so initially it was planned to integrate a mission system of HSS-2B with a bare aircraft of SH-60B, but finally a system newly developed by the TRDI was adopted. It is similar to LAMPS Mk.III in that the helicopter is equipped with a computer and connected to the mothership's combat direction system via a datalink, but it also has a dipping sonar as well as SH-60F. The Defense Agency ordered two XSH-60Js from Sikorsky for $27 million. Their first flights were on 31 August and in October 1987. The Defense Agency designated the model SH-60J. They were fitted with Japanese avionics systems and tested by the JMSDF.

The SH-60J is built in Japan under license from Sikorsky. It began deliveries in August 1991 and entered service thereafter. Based on a concept of the JMSDF, HQS-103 Dipping Sonar, HPS-104 active electronically scanned array Search Radar, and HLR-108 ESM System equipment of the avionics of SH-60B be different. The engine is the GE/IHI T700-IHI-701C turboshaft, which Ishikawajima-Harima Heavy Industries produced under license from General Electric. It is a hybrid of the SH-60B and SH-60F, except for avionics. The crew includes a pilot, copilot and sensor operator. The copilot can concentrate on the role of tactical coordinator with the help of the Automatic Flight Management System and Inertial Navigation system. Over 100 SH-60Js have been produced by 2007.

=== SH-60K ===
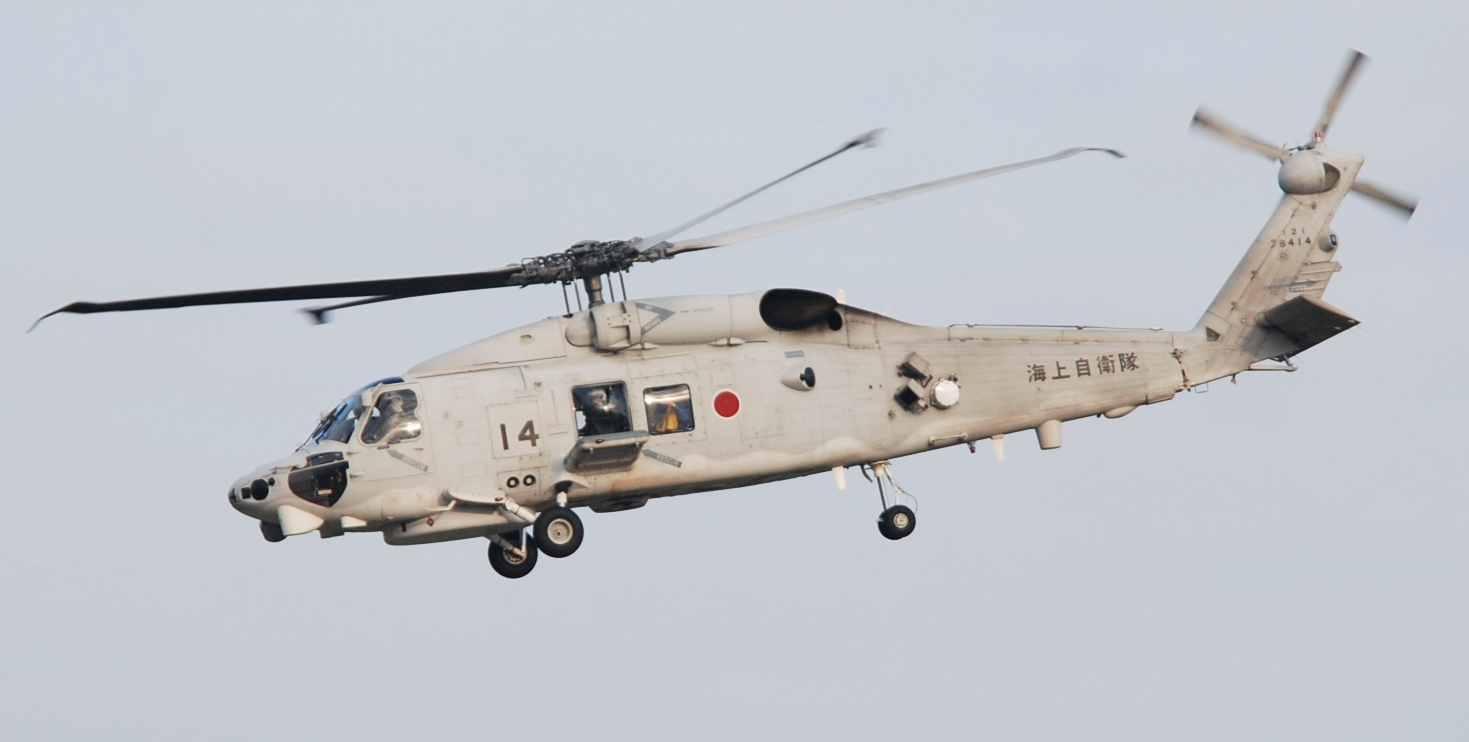
A JMSDF SH-60K, 21st Squadron

The SH-60K is an upgraded version of the SH-60J. The SH-60K anti-submarine helicopter which strengthened performance and versatility for the JMSDF. Mitsubishi began development in 1997. The SH-60K has formerly known as SH-60Kai. The Director General of the Defense Agency admitted adoption in March 2005.

Mitsubishi developed new main rotor blade, Ship Landing Assist System, new avionics system, and other systems. Two prototypes SH-60Ks were built by modifying SH-60Js. These prototypes were completed and delivered by June 2002. The SH-60K's cabin was expanded in length by 30 cm (11.8 in) and in height by 15 cm (5.91 in) compared to the SH-60J. The larger cabin allows for the new avionics system. Those and the airframe changes are compensated by the exchange of the T700-IHI-401C2 engine. The first production SH-60K was delivered to JMSDF on 10 August 2005.

In December 2022, the Japanese government decided to reduce the number of SH-60Ks deployed for maritime patrols and replace some SH-60Ks with Sea Guardian unmanned aerial vehicles. The Japanese government plans to increase its defense budget from 1.24% of GDP in fiscal 2021 to around 2.0% within 10 years, a decision made as part of efforts to use the budget efficiently.

=== SH-60L ===
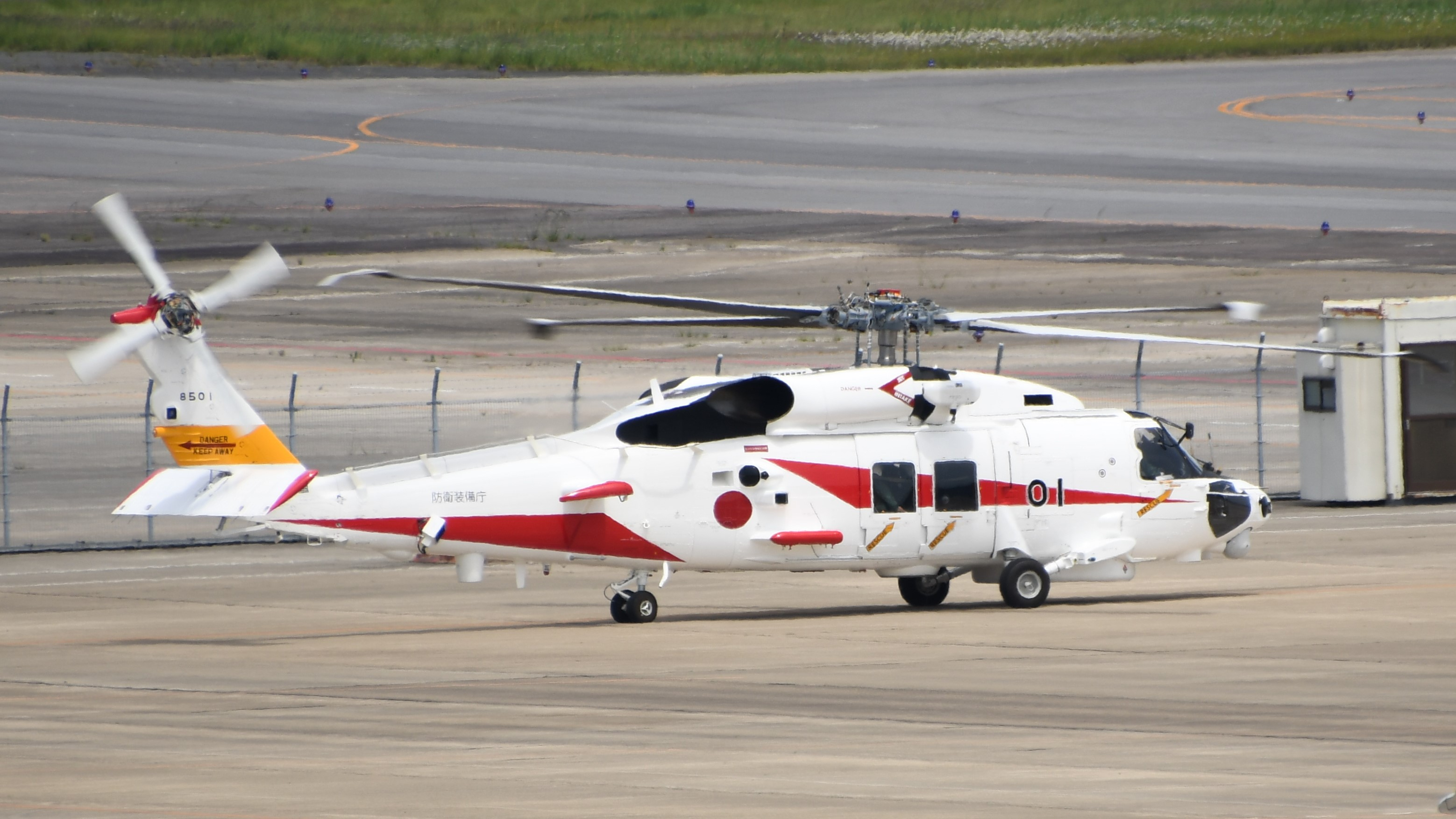
XSH-60L

A further upgrade version of SH-60K has planned and in development since 2015 under an ATLA contract. It will be equipped with a multi-static sonar system and a new adaptive control millimetric wave ultra-high-speed communication system (Click System) as well as improved engine transmission performance.

The first flight of the prototype, XSH-60L, was carried out on May 11, 2021.

=== UH-60J ===
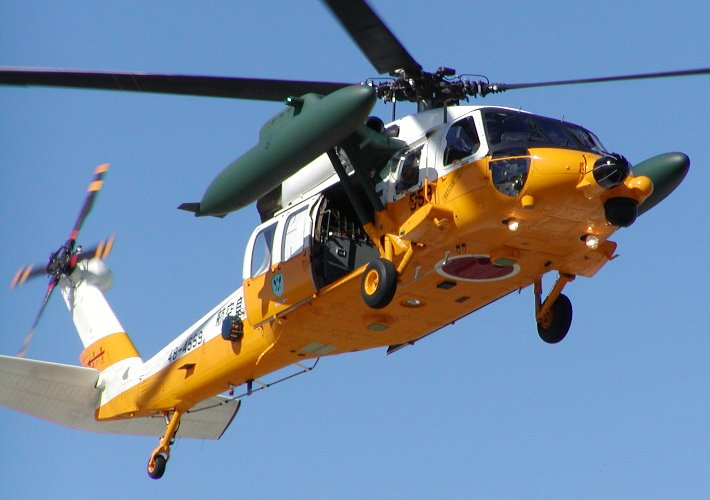
A JASDF UH-60J, Training Squadron

In 1988, the Japan Air Self-Defense Force choose the UH-60L to replace its KV-107 and Sikorsky S-62 helicopters. The first aircraft was built by Sikorsky, with the company designation S-70A-12, and two more were assembled by Mitsubishi Heavy Industries. Mitsubishi is producing the remaining UH-60Js under license. The Japan Marine Self-Defense Force also chose Search and rescue, and utility helicopters to replace the S-61A in 1989.

The UH-60J is powered by T700 engines license-built by Ishikawajima-Harima Heavy Industries in Japan. It features external fuel tanks, an external rescue winch, a Japan-built radar, a FLIR turret in the nose and bubble side windows for observers. The Japan Air Self-Defense Force machines were fitted with T700-IHI-701A engines, while Japan Maritime Self-Defense Force machines were fitted with marinized T700-IHI-401C engines. Fuel tanks can be attached to pylons on stub wings. The UH-60Js began deliveries in 1991 and entered service in 1992. A total of 40 UH-60Js were in service in 2010. The JASDF ordered 40 newer UH-60Js in December 2010 to begin replacing older UH-60Js.

Mitsubishi and Sikorsky have teamed in support of the Self Defense Force's mission requirements. The UH-60J+ incorporates various upgrades for the modern SAR mission. By 2006 Defense budget of Japan, UH-60Js begin addition of Refueling probe in 2009. These UH-60Js completed training with the United States Air Force and widened their activity in SAR mission.

In service from December 1991 to July 24, 2024. Future SAR operations would be provided by the Japan Air Self-Defense Force and the Japan Coast Guard.

=== UH-60JA ===
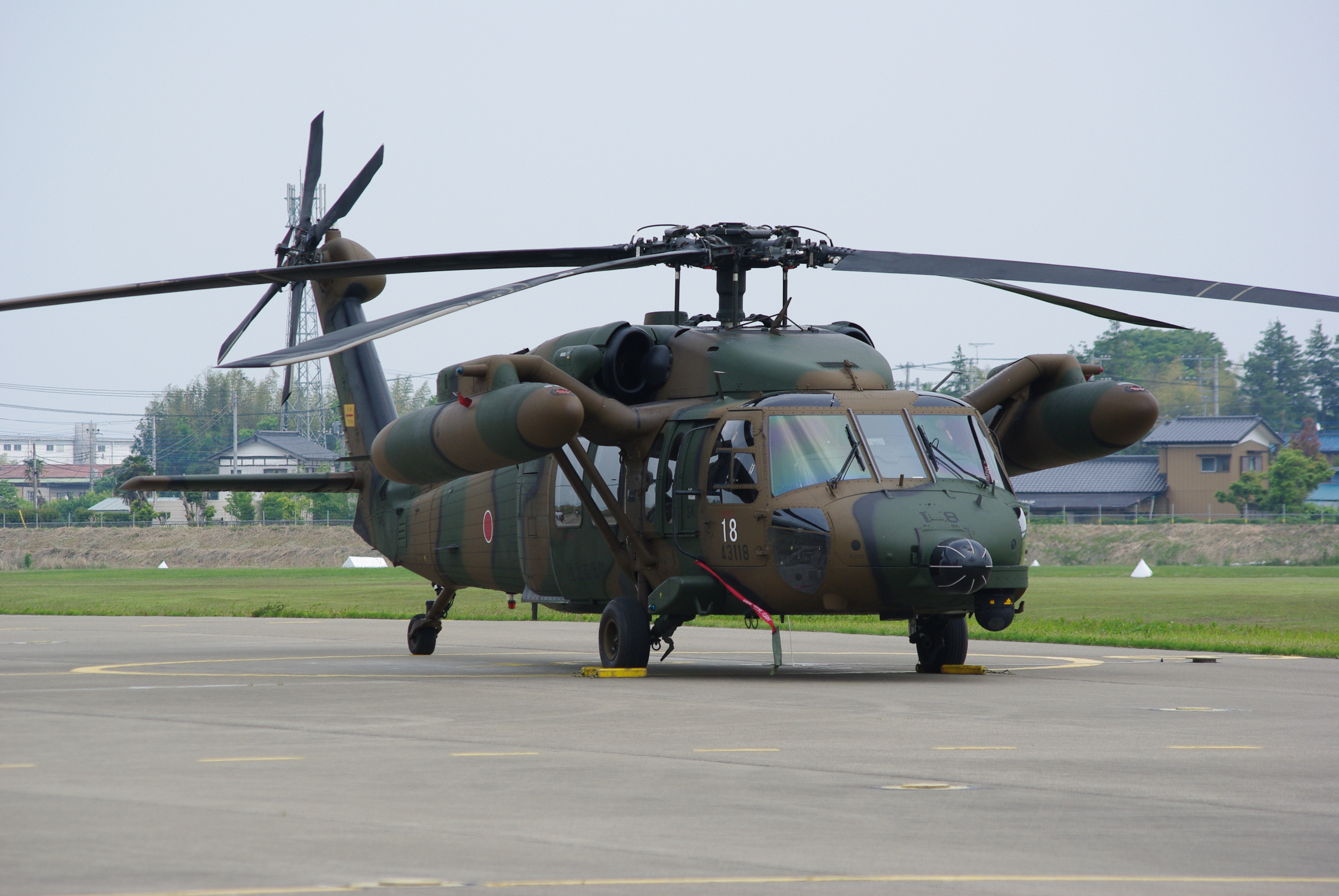
A JGSDF UH-60JA, Kasumigaura Aviation School

The Japan Ground Self-Defense Force ordered a utility variant of the UH-60L designated UH-60JA in 1995. The JGSDF began receiving the UH-60JA in 1997. It features improved avionics, including FLIR, Color weather radar, GPS receiver, a Night Vision Goggle compatible cockpit and wire cutter. The JGSDF plans to acquire 70.

The JGSDF plan was to replace its UH-1H helicopters which had become obsolete. Due to budgetary constraints it was decided to replace the rotary wing fleet with a high-low combination of UH-60JA and UH-1J (an updated UH-1H) with the UH-60JA being the high and the UH-1J the low. By 2004, the budgetary constraints have driven the JGSDF to seriously consider eliminating either the UH-60JA or the UH-1J from the fleet, and purchasing just one type of airframe for the utility mission.

== Variants ==
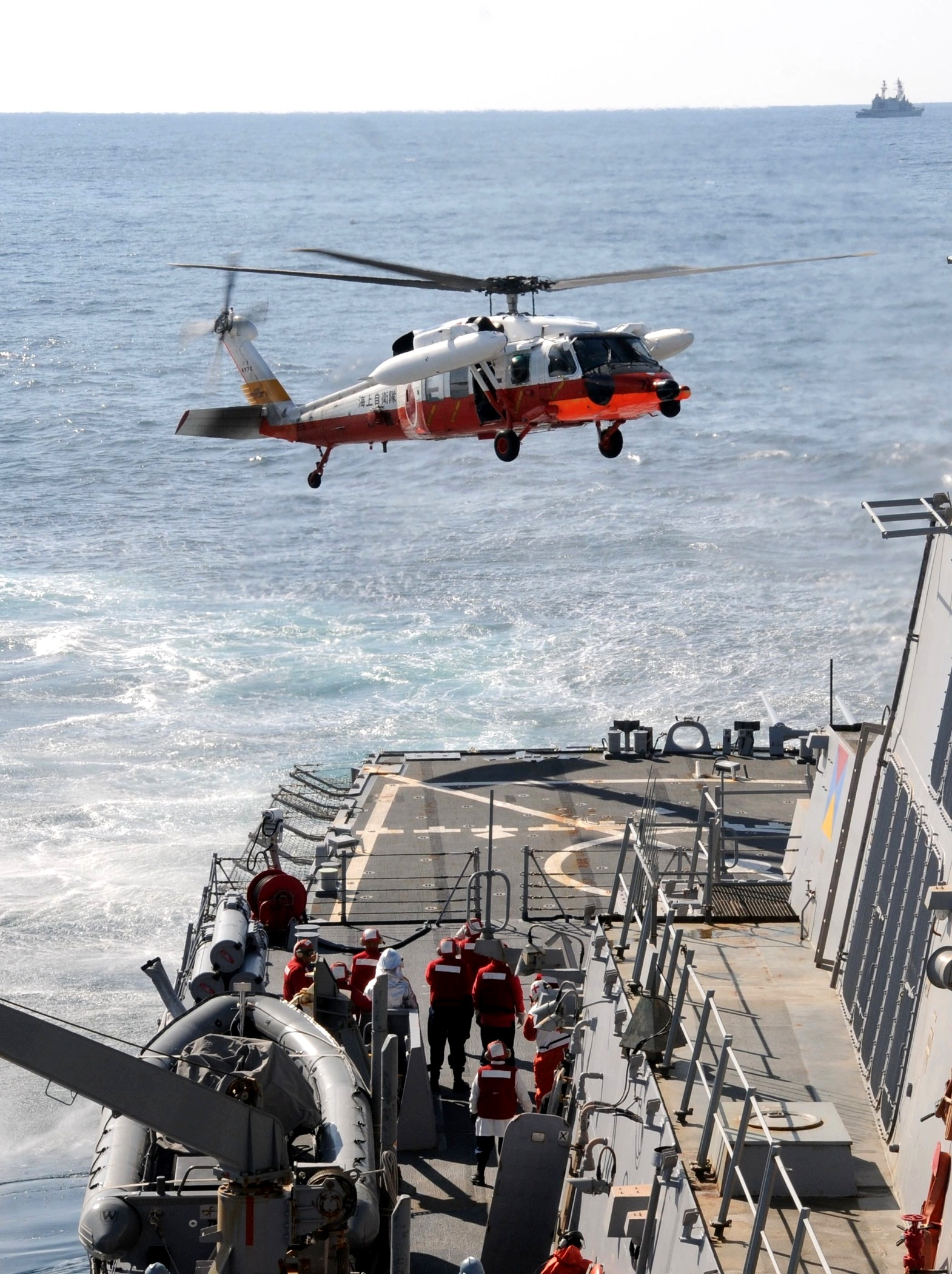
JMSDF UH-60J lands aboard USS Fitzgerald

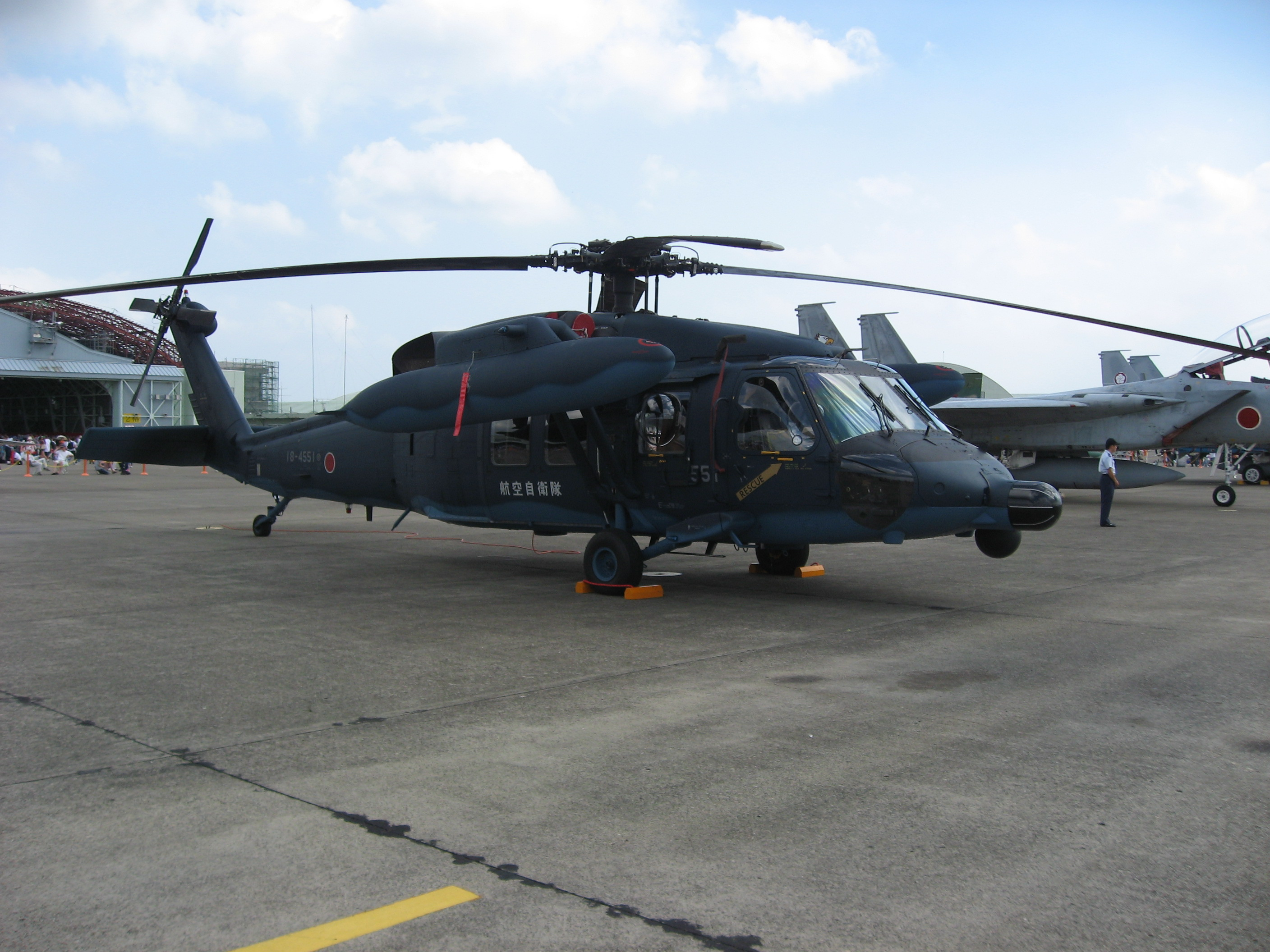
JASDF UH-60J, Hyakuri Air Rescue Wing

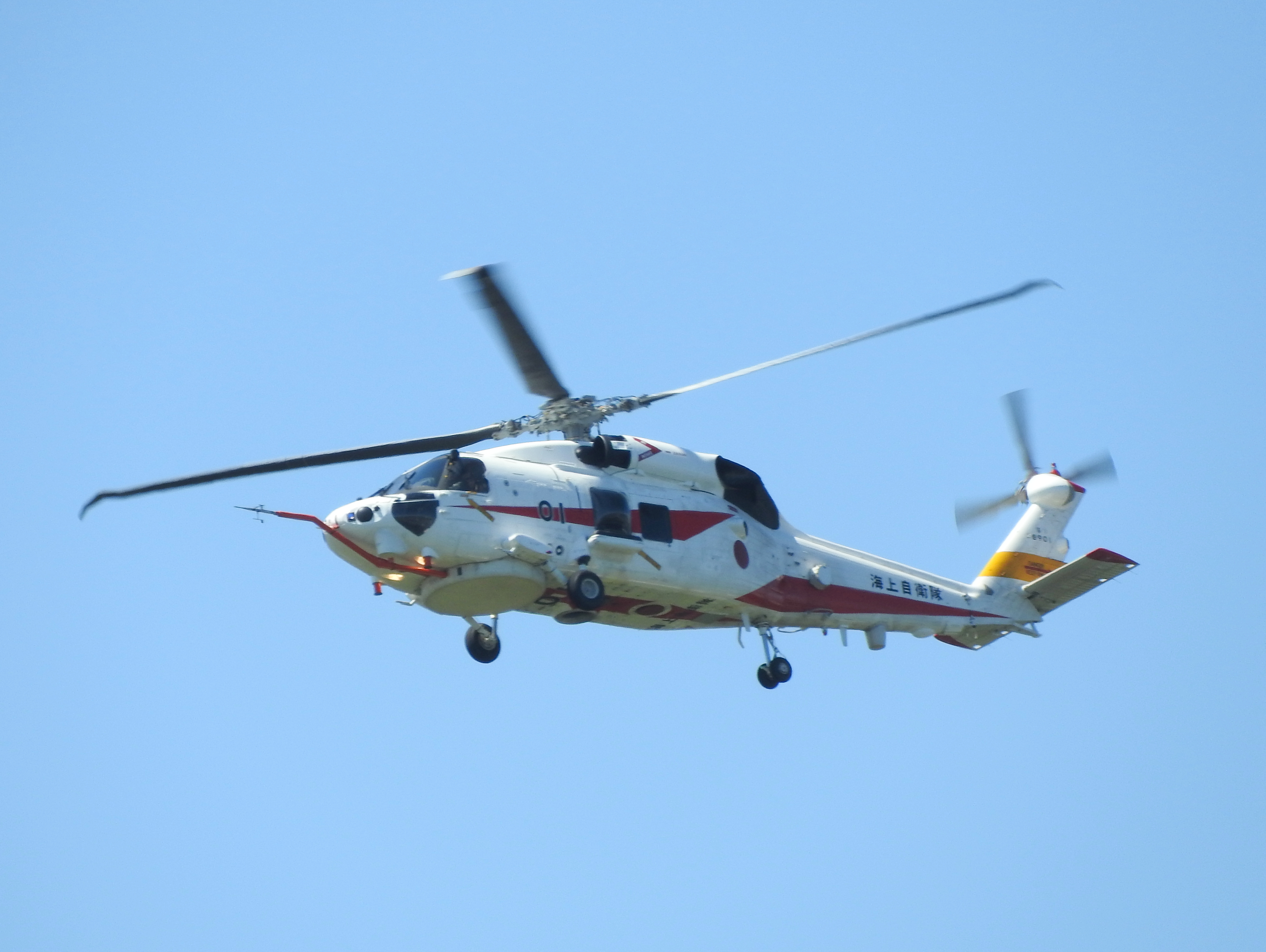
JMSDF USH-60K #8901 of Air Development Squadron 51

- S-70B-2: Version purchased from Sikorsky for research by the Defense Agency.
- XSH-60J: Prototype for SH-60J. 2 XSH-60Js were exported by Sikorsky.
- SH-60J: Seahawk version for the Japan Maritime Self-Defense Force produced by Mitsubishi under licence.
- UH-60J: Rescue helicopter license produced by Mitsubishi for the Japan Air Self-Defense Force and the Japan Maritime Self-Defense Force.
- UH-60JA: Utility version for the Japan Ground Self-Defense Force based on the UH-60J.
- USH-60K: Among two prototypes, one was redesignated as evaluation type.
- SH-60K: Improved version of SH-60J. Trial manufacture finished in 2001, and deliveries began in August 2005.
- SH-60L: Improved version of SH-60K. Development began in 2015, deliveries started in 2022.

== Operators ==
Japan

- Japan Air Self-Defense Force has 37 UH-60Js in operation as of March 2022.

UH-60Js Search and rescue wing.

  - Air Rescue Wing Chitose Detachment
  - Air Rescue Wing Matsushima Detachment
  - Air Rescue Wing Ashiya Detachment
  - Air Rescue Wing Akita Detachment
  - Air Rescue Wing Hyakuri Detachment
  - Air Rescue Wing Nyutabaru Detachment
  - Air Rescue Wing Niigata Detachment
  - Air Rescue Wing Hamamatsu Detachment
  - Air Rescue Wing Naha Detachment
  - Air Rescue Wing Komatsu Detachment
  - Air Rescue Wing Komaki Detachment (Training squadron)
- Japan Ground Self-Defense Force has 40 UH-60JAs in operation as of March 2022.
  - 15th Brigade
    - No. 15 Helicopter Wing (Camp Naha): UH-60JAs Search and rescue squadron.
  - 1st Helicopter Brigade
    - No. 102 Squadron (Camp Kisarazu): UH-60JAs Subsidiary Air assault unit.
  - 12th Brigade
    - No. 12 Helicopter Wing 1st Squadron (Camp Kita-Utunomiya)
  - Western Army Aviation Group
    - Western Helicopter Wing (Camp Metabaru)
  - Kasumigaura Aviation School
  - Educational Support Squadron
- Japan Maritime Self-Defense Force has 12 SH-60Js and 75 SH-60Ks in operation as of March 2022.
  - No. 21 Squadron (Tateyama Air Base): Fleet Air Force (SH-60J and SH-60K).
  - No. 22 Squadron (Ōmura Air Base): Fleet Air Force.
  - No. 51 Squadron (Naval Air Facility Atsugi): Operational Evaluation Unit.
  - No. 72 Squadron (Tateyama Air Base, Ominato Naval Base and Iwojima Air Base): UH-60Js Search and rescue squadron.
  - No. 73 Squadron (Ōmura Air Base, Tokushima Air Base and Kanoya Air Base)

== Accidents ==
On 26 August 2017, a Japan Maritime Self-Defense Force SH-60J crashed in the Sea of Japan off Aomori Prefecture in northern Japan. The helicopter was conducting takeoff and landing drills and had taken off from the destroyer Setogiri. It was based at the JMSDF's Ominato base in Mutsu in Aomori. One crew member was rescued, the other three were missing. The JMSDF attributed the crash to human error. The wreckage was later discovered at a depth of around 2,600 meters. The wreck was salvaged in October and two bodies were found, that of the pilot and co-pilot. One crew member remains missing.

On 17 October 2017, UH-60J 58-4596 of the Air Rescue Wing Hamamatsu Detachment crashed into the sea off Shizuoka Prefecture while conducting night rescue drills. Some wreckage was found but the four crew members were not located. Major searches continued with SDF assets with other parts recovered. A private salvage company started work from 2 November and located part of the fuselage. In November, parts of the aircraft were recovered including the Flight Data Recorder (black box) from a location approximately 31 kilometers south of Hamamatsu Air Base. On 29 November the body of one of the crew members was discovered in the wreckage.

On 20 April 2024, two SH-60Ks carrying four crew members each crashed near Torishima Island during a nighttime anti-submarine warfare training operation. Contact with the first helicopter was lost at 10:38pm local time (13:38 UTC) with the second one being lost around 11:04pm (14:04 UTC). Japanese defense officials believe it is highly likely that the helicopters collided. Some wreckage, including flight data recorders, a blade from each aircraft, helmets, and other wreckage, were found by rescuers. One crew member is confirmed dead, while the other seven remain missing. The Japanese Maritime Self-Defense Force sent 12 vessels and seven aircraft to aid in search operations. U.S. Ambassador to Japan Rahm Emanuel offered the United States's support with the search and rescue operation. A JMSDF report published in July of that same year stated that the accident was caused by a lack of instructions to the crew from the commanding officers aboard the ships and a failure to keep a lookout and communicate with each other from the helicopters crews side. The same report also stated that all 8 occupants of the helicopters had died in the accident. The JMSDF reported that the bodies were found when the SH-60Ks were salvaged.

== Specifications (SH-60J) ==
Data from Jane's All the World's Aircraft 2004-05

General characteristics

- Crew: 3 flight crew + mission crew of up to 9 (SH-60J/K)
- Length: 19.8 m (65 ft 0 in) including rotor
- Height: 5.2 m (17 ft 1 in)
- Max takeoff weight: 9,750 kg (21,495 lb)
- Powerplant: 2 × IHI Corporation-General Electric T700-IHI-401C turboshaft engines, 1,342 kW (1,800 hp) each
- Main rotor diameter: 16.4 m (53 ft 10 in)
- Main rotor area: 211.26 m^{2} (2,274.0 sq ft)
- Blade section: root: SC1095/SC1095R8; tip: Sikorsky SC1095

Performance

- Maximum speed: 265 km/h (165 mph, 143 kn)
- Range: 584 km (363 mi, 315 nmi)
- Service ceiling: 5,790 m (19,000 ft)

Armament

- 2 × Mark 46 torpedo
- 1 × 7.62 mm (.30 in) Type 74 machine gun
- Type 74 torpedo
- Type 12 torpedo
- AGM-114 Hellfire
- Depth charge

Avionics

- Japanese HPS-105 search radar
- Japanese ring laser AHRS
- Japanese automatic FMS
- Japanese datalink
- Japanese tactical processor
- Japanese display sub-system

== See also ==
Related development

- Sikorsky CH-148 Cyclone
- Sikorsky HH-60 Pave Hawk
- Sikorsky MH-60 Jayhawk
- Sikorsky S-70
- Sikorsky SH-60 Seahawk
- Sikorsky UH-60 Black Hawk

Aircraft of comparable role, configuration, and era

- Harbin Z-20
- Kamov Ka-27
- NHIndustries NH90

Related lists

- List of military aircraft of Japan
- List of rotorcraft
