= Northrop T-38 Talon =

Military advanced trainer aircraft by Northrop

T-38 Talon
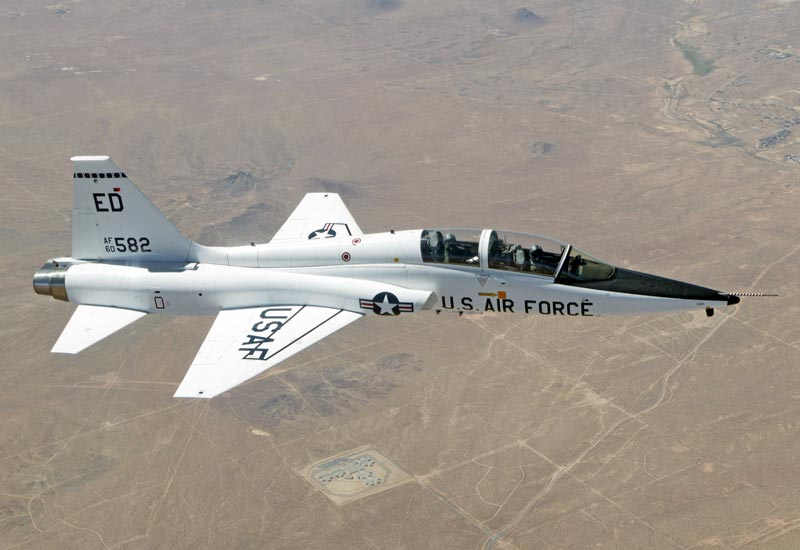
- A T-38A from Edwards Air Force Base

General information
- Type: Advanced trainer
- National origin: United States
- Manufacturer: Northrop Corporation
- Status: Operational
- Primary users: United States Air Force United States Navy; NASA; Turkish Air Force
- Number built: 1,187

History
- Manufactured: 1961–1972
- Introduction date: 17 March 1961
- First flight: 10 April 1959
- Developed from: Northrop N-156
- Variant: Northrop F-5

The Northrop T-38 Talon is a two-seat, twinjet supersonic jet trainer designed and produced by the American aircraft manufacturer Northrop Corporation. It was the world's first supersonic trainer as well as the most produced.

The T-38 can be traced back to 1952 and Northrop's N-102 Fang and N-156 fighter aircraft projects. During the mid-1950s, Northrop officials decided to adapt the N-156 to suit a recently issued general operating requirement by the United States Air Force (USAF) for a supersonic trainer to replace the Lockheed T-33. The bid was successful, in no small part due to its lower lifecycle cost comparisons to competing aircraft, and the company received an initial order to build three prototypes. The first of these, designated YT-38, made its maiden flight on 10 April 1959. The T-38 was introduced to USAF service on 17 March 1961.

The USAF is the largest operator of the T-38. Additional operators of the T-38 include NASA and the United States Navy. The U.S. Naval Test Pilot School in Patuxent River, Maryland, is the principal US Navy operator. Other T-38s were previously used by the US Navy for dissimilar air combat training until replaced by the similar Northrop F-5 Tiger II. Pilots of other NATO nations have commonly flown the T-38 during joint training programs with American pilots. The T-38 remains in service as of 2026 with several air forces. As of 2026, the T-38 has been in service for over 60 years with the USAF, its original operator.

In September 2018, USAF announced the possible replacement of the Talon by the Boeing–Saab T-7 Red Hawk by 2034, if a planned initial low rate production of the T-7A occurred by 2026. This replacement timeline is dependent on congressional approval and aircraft being delivered, evaluated, and receiving Initial Operating Capability by the USAF in 2027.

== Development ==
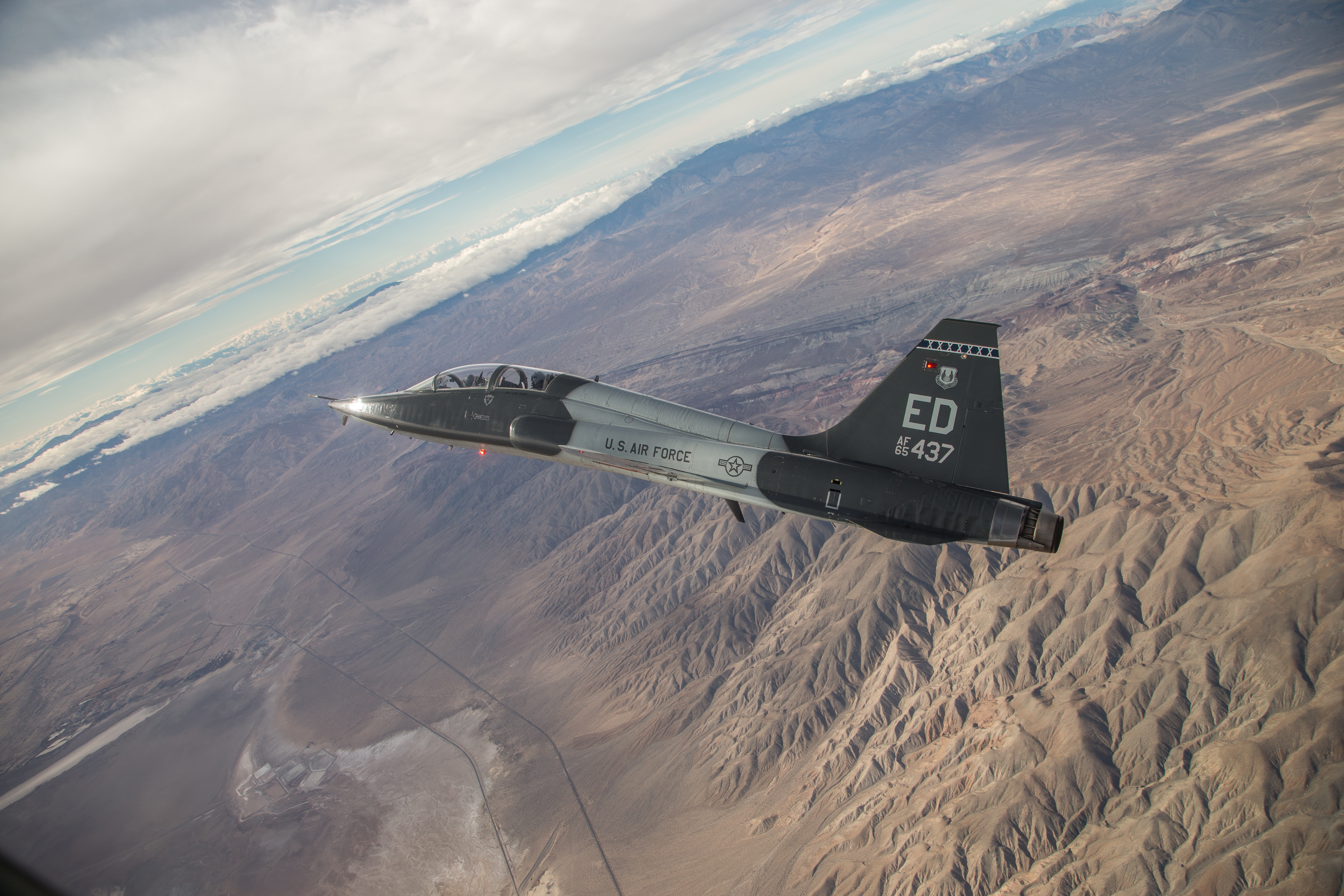
A T-38C assigned to the 416th Flight Test Squadron, 412th Test Wing, Air Force Test Center, flies over the Mojave desert near Edwards AFB, California

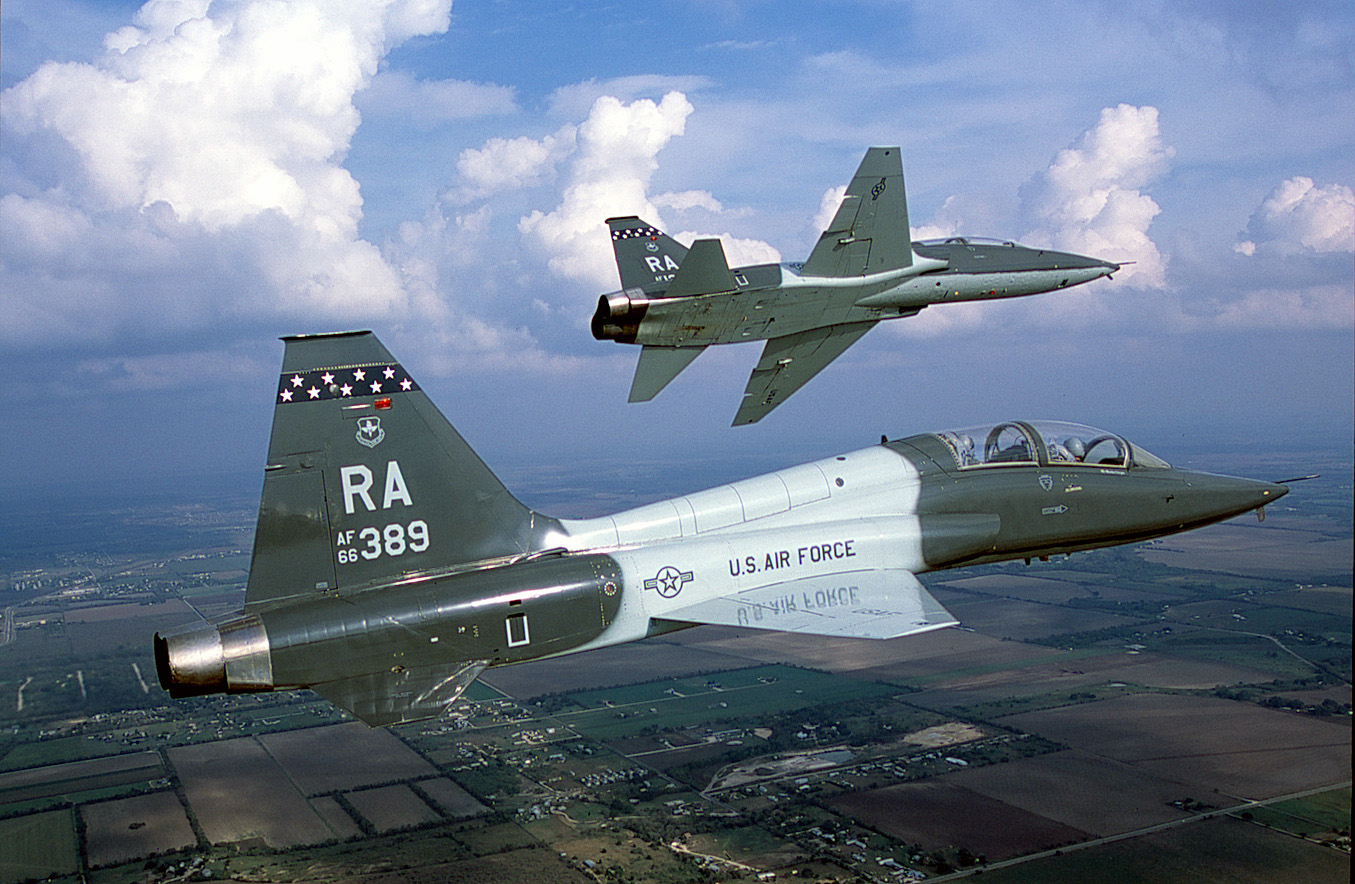
Air-to-air right side view of a USAF T-38 Talon aircraft from 560th Flying Training Squadron, Randolph AFB, Texas, as his lead performs a left pitchout

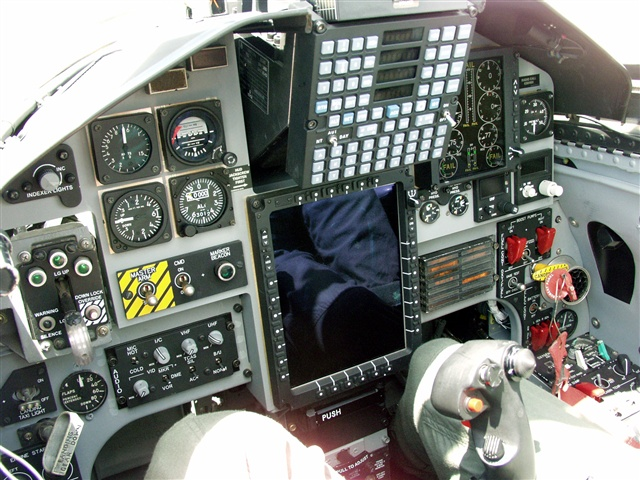
A T-38C cockpit

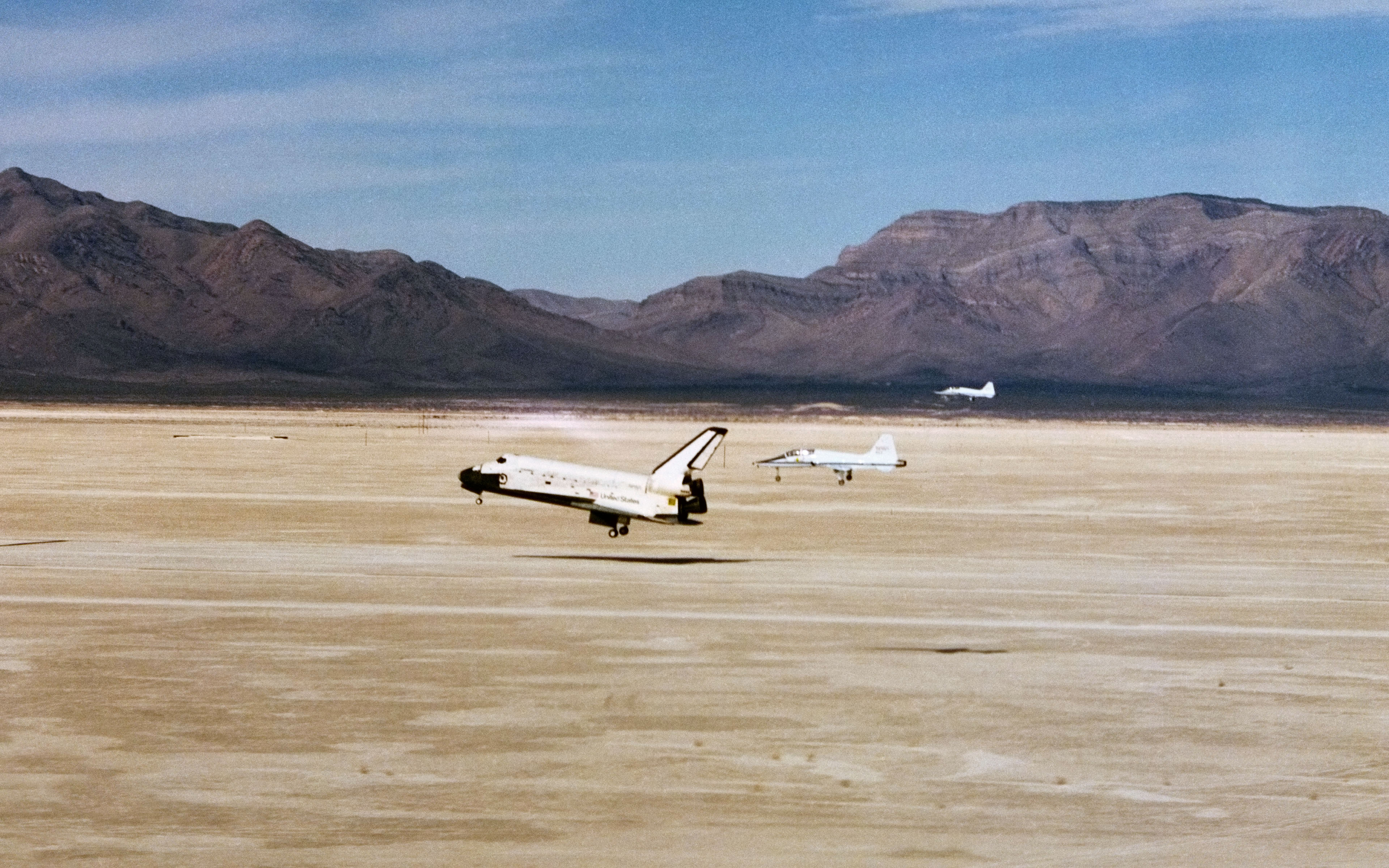
Two T-38 chase planes follow Space Shuttle Columbia as it lands at Northrop Strip in White Sands, New Mexico, ending its mission STS-3

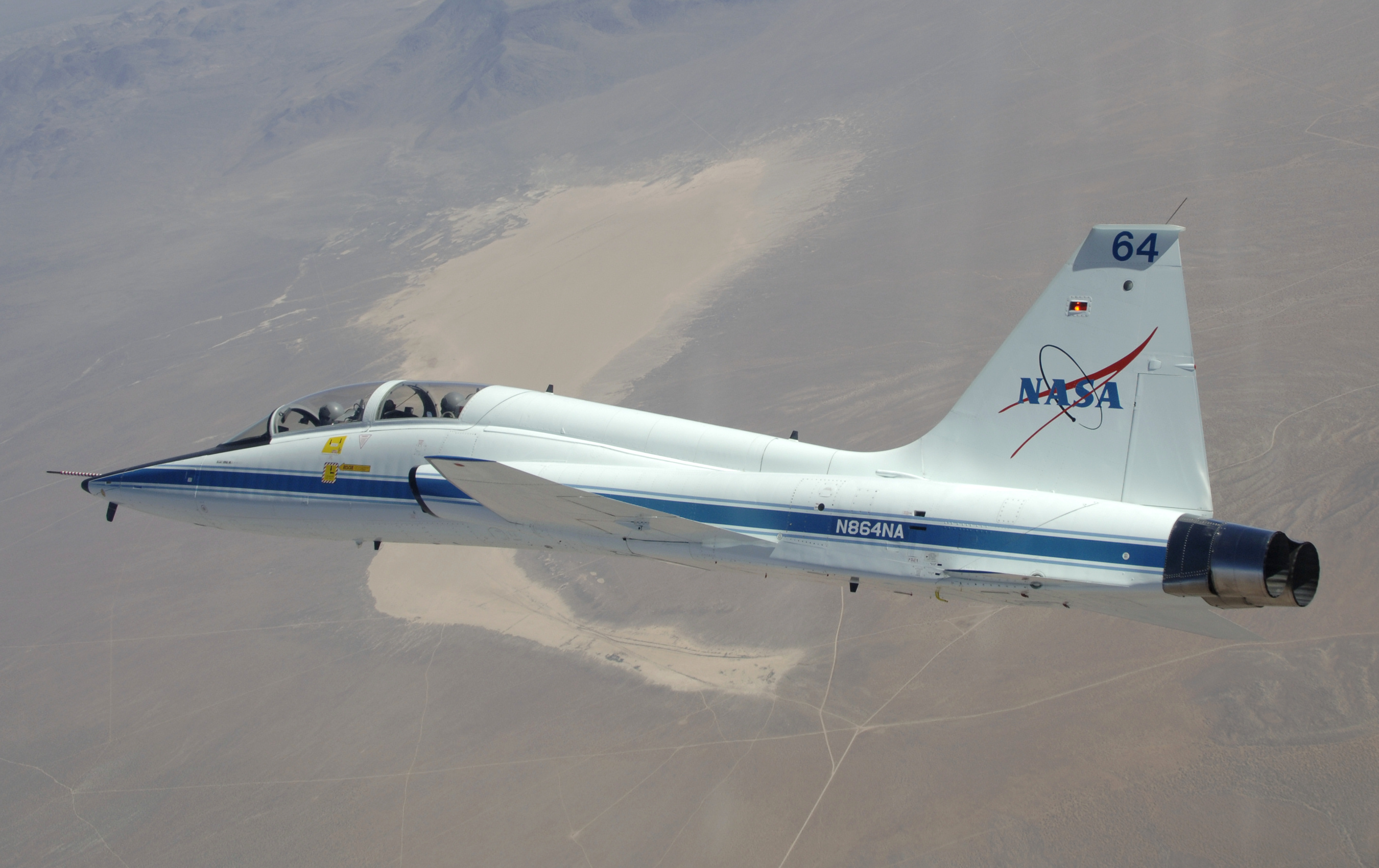
NASA Dryden's T-38 in flight over Cuddeback Dry Lake in Southern California

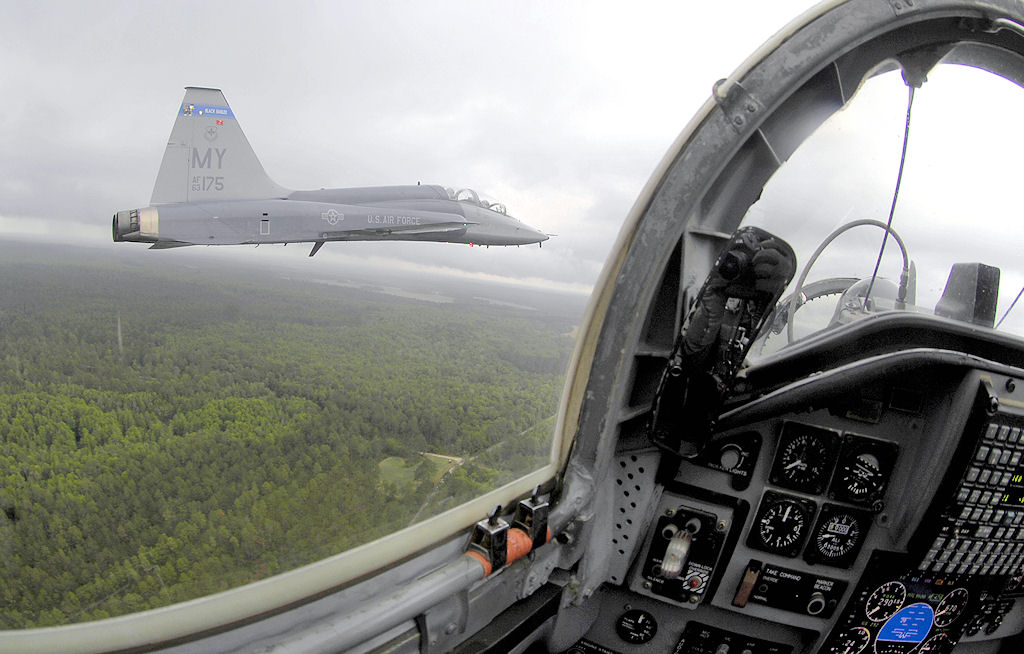
Picture of the formation leader, taken from the backseat of a T38C, of the 479th Fighter Training Group, Moody AFB, Georgia, 2006

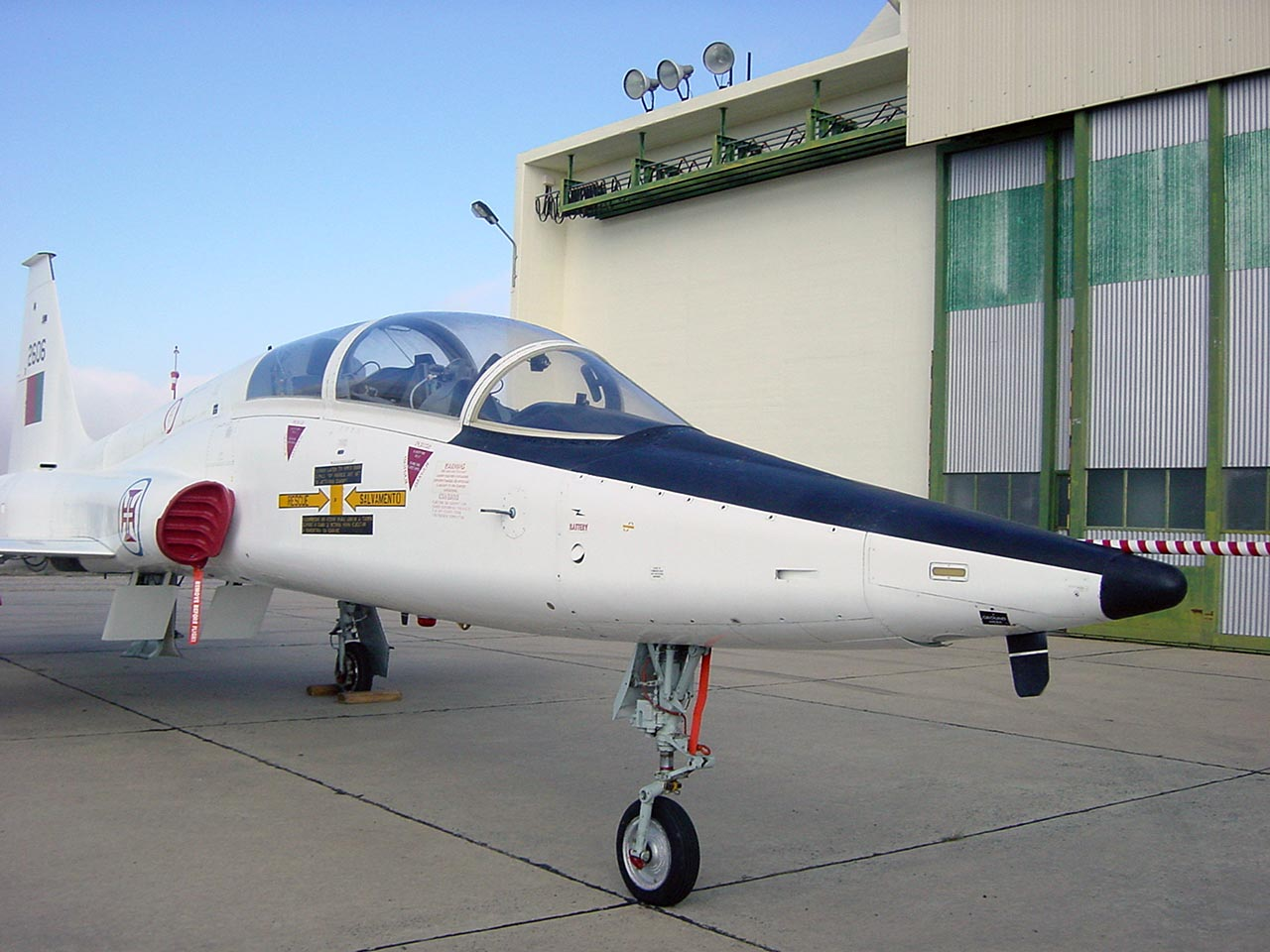
A T-38 in Portuguese Air Force colours at Air Base No. 11 (BA11 – Beja)

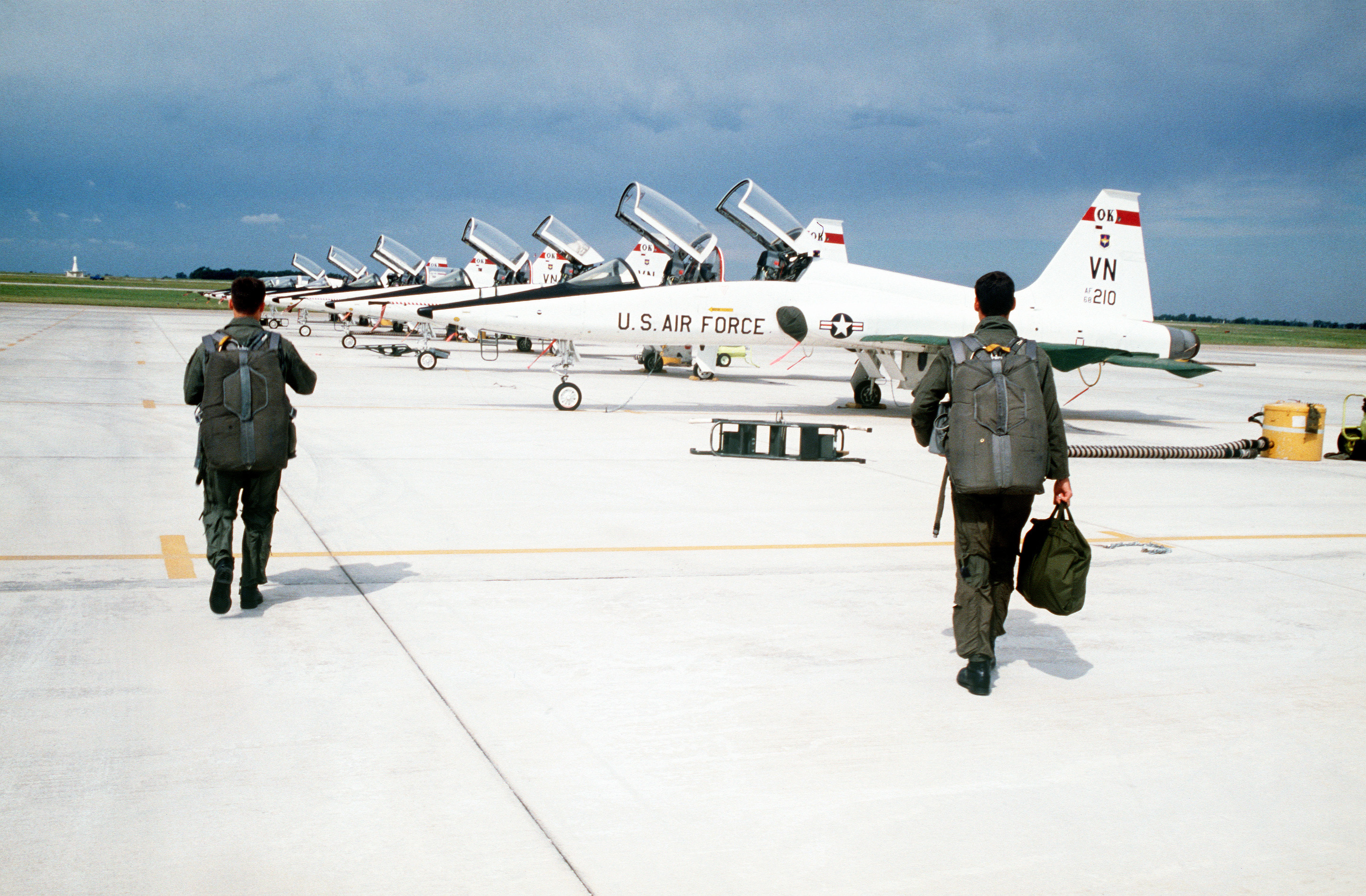
U.S. Air Force 25th Flying Training Squadron instructor pilot and his student walk to a T-38A to begin flight training at Vance Air Force Base, Oklahoma, November 1997

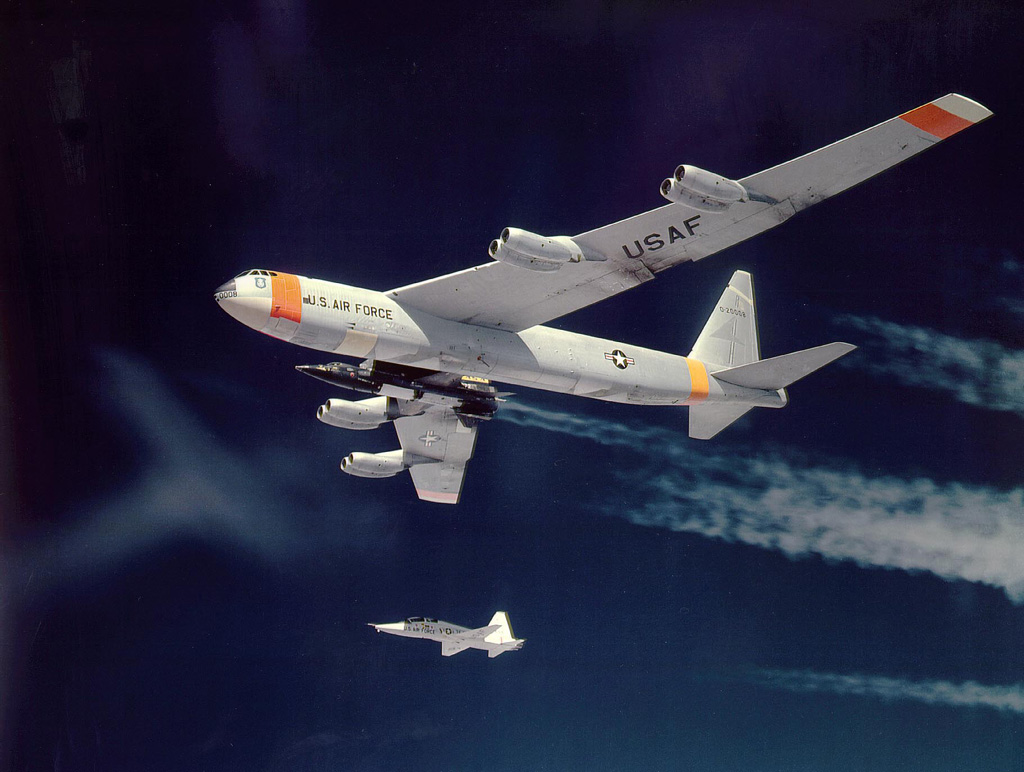
An X-15 in flight attached to a B-52 mother ship, with a T-38 chase plane, 1961

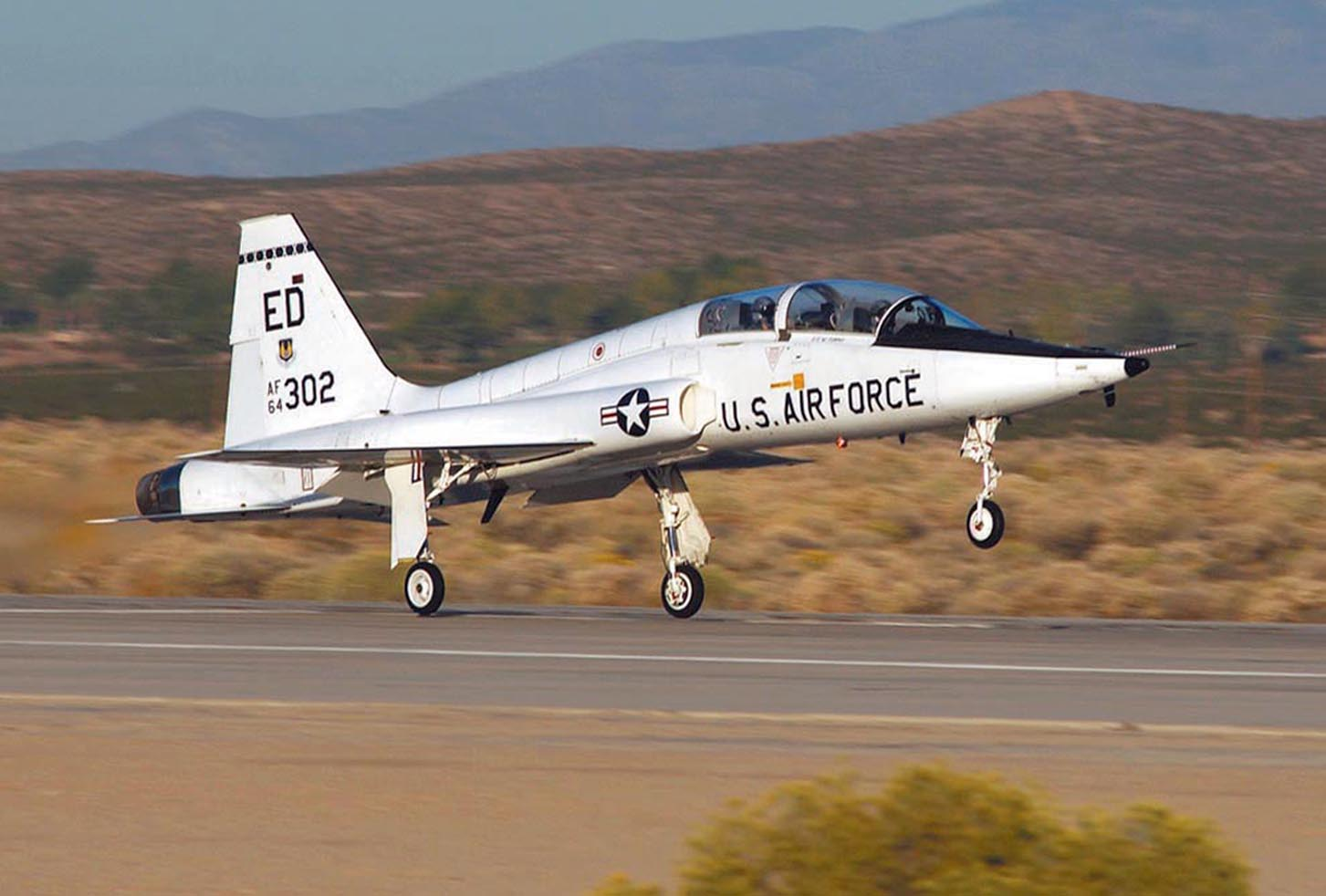
A T-38 takes off from Edwards Air Force Base with only one engine during single-engine takeoff testing, to evaluate recommended speeds for takeoff if an engine fails

In 1952, Northrop began work on a fighter project, the N-102 Fang, with shoulder-mounted delta wing and a single engine. The proposed General Electric J79 engine, weighing nearly two tons, meant the resulting aircraft would be large and expensive. During 1953, representatives from General Electric Aviation's newly created Small Aircraft Engine Department showed Northrop a relatively compact engine, around 400 lb (0.18 ton) installed weight, capable of 2,500 lb of thrust. Upon seeing the engine, Northrop VP-Engineering Edgar Schmued saw the possibility of reversing the trend toward the large fighters.

Schmued and chief engineer Welko Gasich decided on a small, twin-engined "hot-rod" fighter, the N-156. Northrop launched its N-156 project in 1954, aiming for a small, supersonic fighter jet capable of operating from the US Navy's escort carriers. When the Navy chose not to pursue equipping its fleets in such a fashion, favoring large fleet carriers instead, Northrop opted to continue work on the N-156 using in-house funding. It was instead recast as a lightweight fighter, referred to as the N-156F, that was primarily aimed at the export market.

In the mid-1950s, the USAF issued a general operating requirement for a supersonic trainer, seeking to retire its 1940s-era Lockheed T-33s for an aircraft better suited to training pilots to fly its high speed fighter aircraft. Northrop officials decided to adapt the N-156 to this competition. The only other candidate was the two-seat version of the North American F-100 Super Sabre. Although the F-100 was not considered the ideal candidate for a training aircraft (it is not capable of recovering from a spin), NAA was still considered the favorite in the competition due to that company's favored-contractor status with the USAF, but Northrop officials presented lifecycle cost comparisons that proved to be highly persuasive amongst USAF officials. Accordingly, Northrop was awarded an initial contract in June 1956 to produce three prototypes, designated YT-38.

On 10 April 1959, the first YT-38 performed its maiden flight at the hands of test pilot Lew Nelson.

The type was quickly adopted. The first production examples were delivered in 1961, entering service on 17 March 1961, complementing the Cessna T-37 Tweet primary jet trainer. When production ended in 1972, 1,187 T-38s had been built, plus two N-156T prototypes. Since its introduction, an estimated 50,000 military pilots have trained on this aircraft. The USAF remains one of the few armed flying forces using dedicated supersonic final trainers, as most, such as the US Navy, use high-subsonic trainers.

During 1962, the T-38 set absolute time-to-climb records for 3,000, 6,000, 9,000, and 12,000 meters, beating the records for those altitudes set by the F-104 in December 1958. The F-4 Phantom beat the T-38's records less than a month later.

The majority of T-38s built were of the T-38A variant. The USAF had a small number of aircraft converted for weapons training, designated AT-38B, which were fitted with a gunsight and could carry a gun pod, rockets, or bombs on a centerline pylon. By the end of September 2017, 503 T-38s were still operational with the USAF, while many more remained in operation around the world.

Most of the USAF's aircraft, T-38A and AT-38B, have been converted to the T-38C through an avionics upgrade program. Improvements include the addition of a head-up display, global satellite positioning, inertial navigation system, and traffic collision avoidance system. Most aircraft have received a propulsion modification to improve low-altitude engine thrust. Around a third of the fleet, those that experience more severe usage, are currently undergoing structural replacements and upgrades, as well as receiving new wings, to extend their service life to 2029.

The fighter version of the N-156 was selected for the US Military Assistance Program and produced as the F-5 Freedom Fighter. Many of these have since reverted to a weapons-training role, as various air forces have introduced newer types into service. The F-5G was an advanced single-engined variant later renamed the F-20 Tigershark. In 2018, the Iranian Air Force announced that an outwardly similar aircraft, named the Kowsar, had been constructed within Iran.

== Design ==
The Northrop T-38 Talon is of a conventional configuration, with a small, low-mounted, long-chord wing, a single vertical stabilizer, and tricycle undercarriage. The cockpit accommodates a student pilot and instructor in a tandem seating arrangement. The flight controls were hydraulically-powered and lacked manual reversion, and thus the aircraft would be unflyable in the event of both engines failing mid-flight.

Its handling was relatively conventional and viceless. While it was originally considered to be too easy to fly compared with frontline fighters of the 1960s, by the twenty-first century, it had become regarded as the most challenging aircraft in the USAF's inventory. The aircraft's nimble performance earned it the nickname "white rocket". It had been considered by trainee pilots to be a somewhat unforgiving aircraft from an aerodynamic standpoint.

The T-38 can be visually distinguished from both the F-5B and F-5F, which are also derived from the N-156, by the wings. The wing of the T-38 meets the fuselage straight and ends square, while the F-5 has leading edge extensions near the wing roots and wingtip launch rails for air-to-air missiles. The wings of both the T-38 and the F-5 family use conventional skin over spar-rib structure. The T-38's wings were originally designed to withstand 7.33-G loads and for a fatigue life of 4,000 flight hours. This proved sufficient for the majority of the training syllabus, but was a major limiting factor when the aircraft was used for aggressive dogfighting-style maneuvering. Incidents of wing tips separating mid-flight were reported. Northrop resolved this via the installation of new wings with thickened skins.

Throughout the development process, a strict weight control regime was exercised by the design team. This was one reason for the T-38's relative simplicity; only basic systems for navigation and communication were provided. No fuel was housed within the wings while no provision for external stores was made. The aircraft's twin General Electric J85-5A turbojet engines were accommodated within the fuselage to exert less drag and produce fewer aerodynamic disturbances. The J85-5A engine, despite generating up to 3,850 lb of static thrust, was relatively compact and lightweight for the era, weighing less than 600 pounds. Air was supplied to the engines via intakes at the wing roots. A twin-engine arrangement had been pursued to provide a greater margin of safety.

Various design decisions were taken and features were incorporated to simplify the T-38 and make it as easy to maintain as possible. To avoid removing the vertical fin while changing an engine, the fin was attached directly to the keel structure between the engines. The horizontal stabilizer, along with the entire aft shell of the fuselage that surrounds the engines, could then be removed relatively easily by undoing several fasteners that held the fuselage shell together, and disconnecting two push rods that connected the pilot's control stick to the horizontal stabilizer's hydraulic actuators.

To avoid having to break and reconnect multiple hydraulic lines during an engine swap, designers mounted the hydraulic pump and other accessory drives on the fuselage which joined to the engine by a short driveshaft. Several internal check valves prevented a loss of hydraulic fluid. The engines hung from rails on either side of the central keel. This design enabled ground crews to remove and replace an engine in roughly one hour.

== Operational history ==
=== Military ===
The USAF Strategic Air Command (SAC) had T-38s in service from 1978 until SAC's 1991 inactivation. These aircraft were used to enhance the career development of bomber and tanker copilots through the Accelerated Copilot Enrichment Program. They were later used as proficiency aircraft for all B-52, B-1, Lockheed SR-71, U-2, Boeing KC-135, and KC-10 pilots. SAC's successors, the Air Combat Command (ACC) and the Air Force Global Strike Command (AFGSC) retain T-38s as proficiency aircraft for U-2 pilots and B-2 pilots, respectively.

The Air Training Command's successor, the Air Education and Training Command (AETC), uses the T-38C to prepare pilots for the F-15C Eagle and F-15E Strike Eagle, the F-16 Fighting Falcon, B-52 Stratofortress, B-1B Lancer, B-2 Spirit, A-10 Thunderbolt, F-22 Raptor, and F-35 Lightning II. The AETC received T-38Cs in 2001 as part of the Avionics Upgrade Program. The T-38Cs owned by the AETC have undergone propulsion modernization, which replaces major engine components to enhance reliability and maintainability, and an engine inlet/injector modification to increase available takeoff thrust. These upgrades and modifications, with the Pacer Classic program, were to extend the service life of T-38s past 2020. The T-38 has an availability goal of 75%, which it maintained in 2011. In 2015, its availability was 60%.

After graduating from basic flying on the Cessna T-37 Tweet, pilots were trained on more advanced aspects, including supersonic flight, blind flying, formation flight, handling stalls, single-engine flight procedures, low speed flight, and landing techniques. Prior to the USAF ceasing the practice of trainees flying within icy conditions, the T-38's engines were prone to being damaged by ingesting ice. The relatively small engine intakes are also known to be problematic when flown at low speeds under 'hot and high' conditions.

The landing gear's brakes have been criticised for being relatively weak, one of several factors that necessitates care while landing. Several incidents, including fatalities, have occurred due to imprecise management of the throttles and air speed during landing attempts. Despite these factors, the T-38 has been regarded as a relatively safe trainer aircraft even into the twenty-first century. Between 1961 and 2005, the fleet has cumulatively flown 25 million hours, during which 150 of the 1,187 T-38s built between 1961 and 1972 were recorded as lost, resulting in 45 deaths.

Besides the USAF and the USN, other military operators of the T-38 have included the Luftwaffe, the Portuguese Air Force, the Republic of China Air Force, and the Turkish Air Force.

During late 2010, the USAF launched the T-X program to procure a replacement for its T-38s. Bidders included a joint venture of BAE Systems and Rolls-Royce, offering the Hawk trainer, equipped with Rolls' Adour Mk951 engine with FADEC. Lockheed Martin and Korea Aerospace Industries, offered the T-50. Raytheon and Alenia Aermacchi offered the T-100, an aircraft whose design originated with the M-346.

Boeing and Saab offered a new-technology design powered by the General Electric F404 turbofan engine. The Boeing/Saab bid first flew in December 2016. It was declared the winner of the T-X competition in September 2018.

=== NASA ===
NASA operates a fleet of 32 T-38 trainers. The fleet is typically used to train its astronauts and as a chase plane. NASA's fleet is housed primarily at Ellington Field in Houston, Texas. NASA's internal projections showed the number of operational jet trainers falling to 16 by 2015. The agency spends $25–30 million annually to fly and maintain the T-38s.

In 1966, two Project Gemini astronauts, Elliot See and Charles Bassett, died when their T-38 hit the roof of a McDonnell Douglas fabrication building at Lambert Field in St. Louis. Visibility was poor, but a later investigation concluded that the cause of the crash was likely pilot error.

During the Space Shuttle era, an established NASA tradition was for astronauts to arrive at the Kennedy Space Center in T-38 Talons.

=== Civil ===
Seven privately owned T-38s are in the U.S. Boeing owns two T-38s, which are used as chase planes. Thornton Corporation owns two T-38s, and the National Test Pilot School owns one T-38. Two others are in private ownership.

== Variants ==
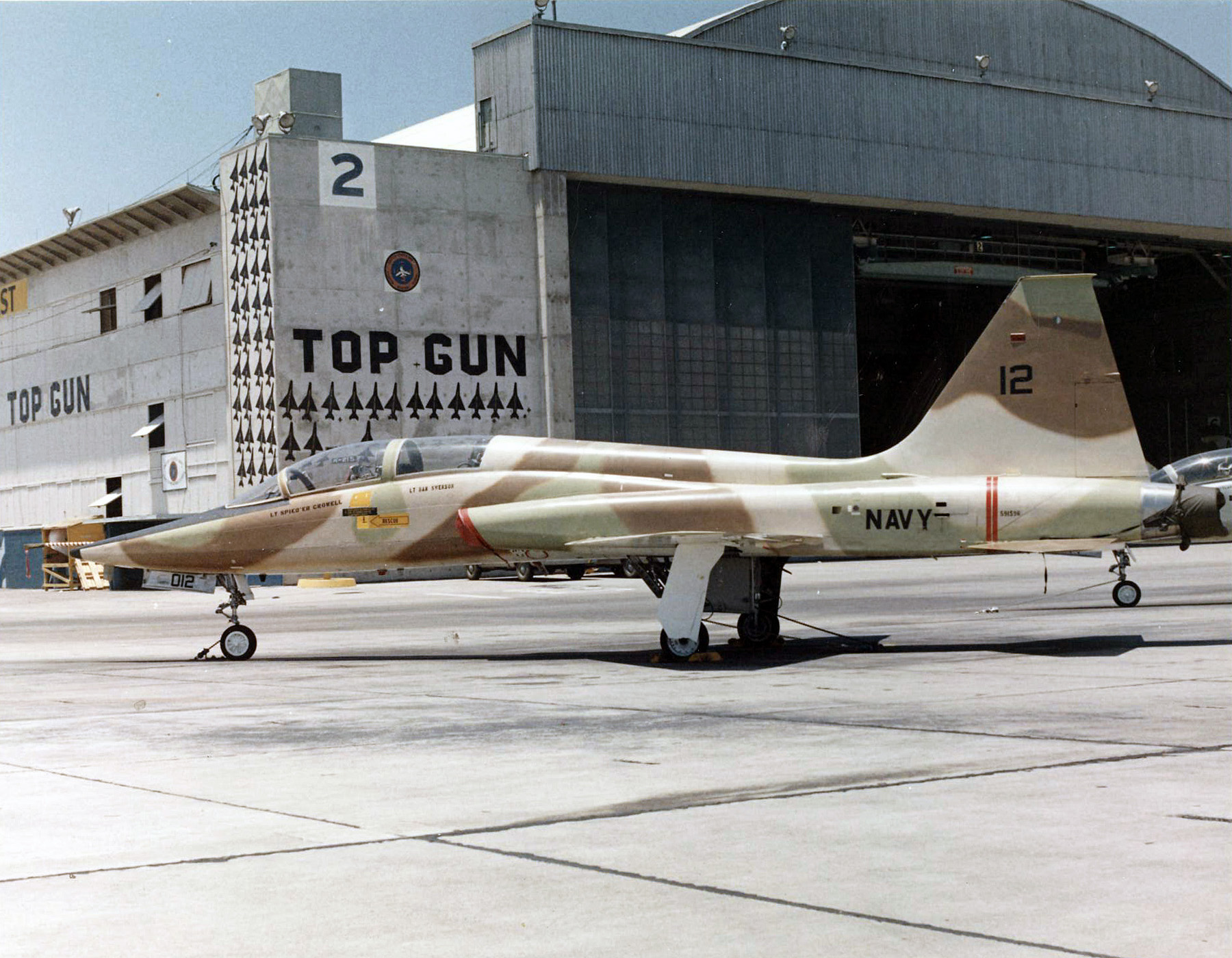
US Navy DT-38A at United States Navy Fighter Weapons School "TOPGUN", 1974

- N-156T: Northrop company designation.
- YT-38: Prototypes, two built with YJ85-GE-1 engines, later designated YT-38A and four pre-production aircraft with YJ-85-GE-5 engines, later designated T-38A.
- T-38A: Two-seat advanced training aircraft, production model, 1,139 built.
- T-38A(N): Two-seat astronaut training version for NASA. See T-38N below.
- DT-38A: A number of US Navy T-38As were converted into drone directors.
- GT-38A: Permanently grounded aircraft, often due to flight or ground mishap, converted into ground procedural trainers or aircraft maintenance trainers.
- NT-38A: A small number of T-38As were converted into research and test aircraft.
- QT-38A: Unmanned target drone aircraft.
- AT-38B: Two-seat weapons training aircraft.
- T-38C: A T-38A with structural and avionics upgrades.
- T-38M: Modernized Turkish Air Force T-38As with full glass cockpit and avionics, upgraded by Turkish Aerospace Industries under the project codename "ARI" (Turkish: Arı, for Bee).
- T-38N: Former USAF T-38As bailed to NASA and T-38As directly assigned to NASA that received an Avionics Upgrade Program (AUP), modernizing communications and navigation systems, replacing outdated avionics, and adding a weather radar, flight management system, altitude alert systems, and modern controls and displays.
- ST-38 or N-205: A proposal to be fitted with 3 rocket engines in the 10,000lb thrust range burning hydrogen peroxide and JP-5, capable of Mach 3.2 and a maximum altitude of 200,000 feet (61,000 m) and only requiring modification to 25% of the airframe. It was to be used for training astronauts as part of the ARPS (Aerospace Research Flight School). It was first proposed in May 1958 and then again in 1963, however the Air Force showed no interest and instead selected the NF-104A.
- T-38 VTOL Proposed vertical takeoff variant with four lift nozzles behind the pilot.

== Operators ==
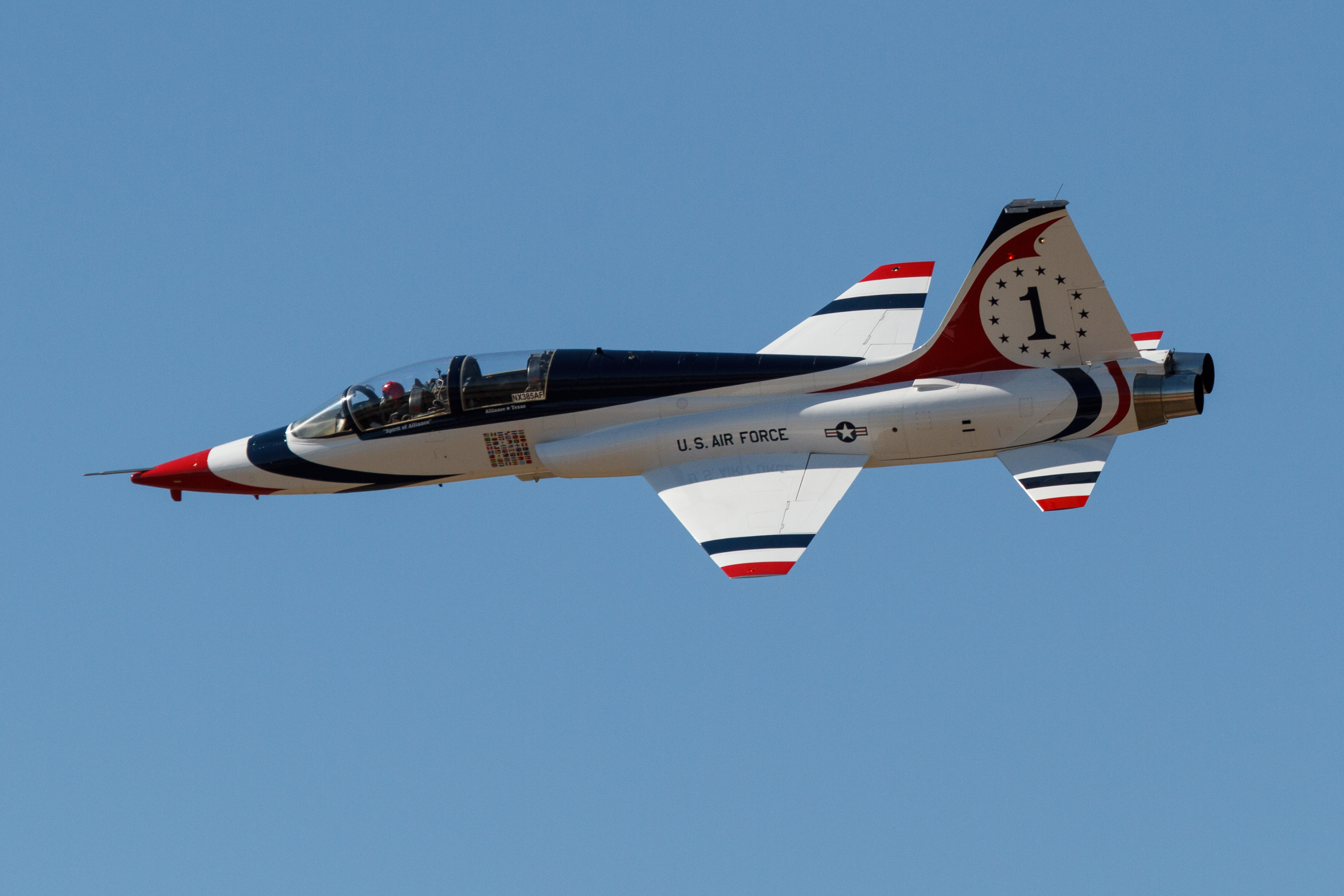
A T-38 Talon in Thunderbirds livery at the Alliance Air Show, 2014

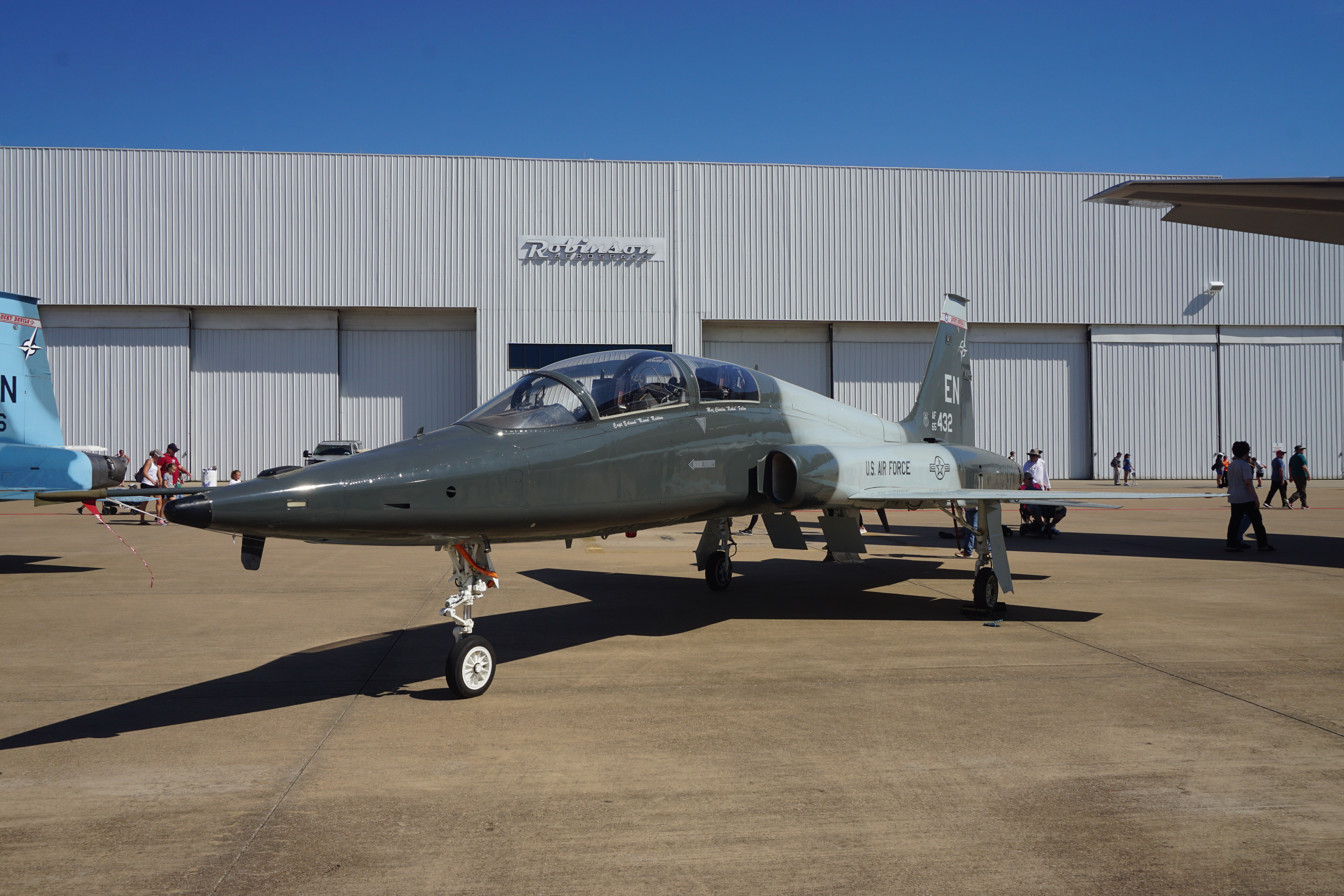
A T-38 Talon at the Fort Worth Alliance Air Show, 2019

=== Current ===
Germany

- German Air Force – 46 T-38A in 1968, now upgraded to T-38C. All aircraft are stationed at Sheppard AFB, Texas and are painted in US markings.

Turkey

- Turkish Air Force – 68 T-38M in service.

United States

- United States Air Force – 485 T-38 trainers in service as of December 2024.
- United States Navy – 10 aircraft in use as of December 2024.
  - United States Naval Test Pilot School
- NASA – approximately 32 aircraft transferred from USAF

=== Former ===
Portugal

- Portuguese Air Force – 12 aircraft in 1977. Initially operated by 201 Sqn. "Falcões" (Falcons) at Air Base No. 5, in 1980 they were transferred to 103 Sqn. "Caracóis" (Snails) being stationed in Air Base No. 11. They were retired in 1993, replaced by Dassault/Dornier Alpha Jet.

Republic of Korea

- Republic of Korea Air Force – 30 T-38A from the US in April 1999. All units were returned to the US by 2009 after near completion of production of T-50 Golden Eagle supersonic trainer.

Taiwan (Republic of China)

- Republic of China Air Force – former operator, all aircraft returned to the US in 1998.

== Accidents and incidents ==
More than 210 aircraft losses and ejections have been documented over the lifetime of the T-38. The USAF has recorded 149 fatalities since operations began in 1960.

- 19 February 1962 – The first crash of a T-38 occurred, near Webb AFB, Texas. One pilot was killed, and one occupant ejected safely.
- 31 October 1964 – Astronaut Theodore Freeman was killed as a result of a bird strike on a NASA operated T-38.
- 28 February 1966 (1966 NASA T-38 crash) – Astronauts Elliot See and Charles Bassett were killed when they struck a building in fog.
- 5 October 1967 – Astronaut Clifton "C.C." Williams was killed in a crash of a NASA operated T-38 due to an aileron jam.
- 9 May 1981 – During an airshow to celebrate the 40th anniversary of Hill Air Force Base, Captain Nick Hauck and 2 livestock were killed when Hauck's T-38 Talon lost power on approach to the runway. The plane cartwheeled several times before exploding. Hauck was killed on impact, while the livestock were killed by debris.
- 18 January 1982 – Diamond Crash – Four T-38As of the U.S. Air Force Thunderbirds crashed while practicing for an airshow. After this crash, the T-38 was replaced in this role by the front line F-16A Fighting Falcon.
- 21 May 2009 – One pilot was killed and the other ejected with serious injuries after a rudder malfunction caused the crash of a USAF T38A.
- 19 July 2013 – The plane went down south of Sheppard Air Force Base at approximately 6:48 a.m., near Pecanway Drive and Horton Lane in Wichita County and the pilots ejected safely with minor injuries.
- 21 November 2019 – Two pilots killed during a collision while landing.
- 19 February 2021 – The two-person USAF crew of a T-38 was killed in a landing crash near Montgomery Regional Airport in Alabama. The aircraft was assigned to the USAF 14th Flying Training Wing at Columbus AFB, Mississippi. The crash was later attributed to pilot error.
- 19 November 2021 – Two aircraft collided on approach to Laughlin Air Force base, resulting in the death of one student.
- 7 November 2022 – A T-38C crashed near Columbus AFB, Mississippi, with one pilot safely ejecting.
- 12 May 2026 - A T-38 Talon II crashed in Lamar County, Alabama, with two pilots safely ejecting.

== Aircraft on display ==
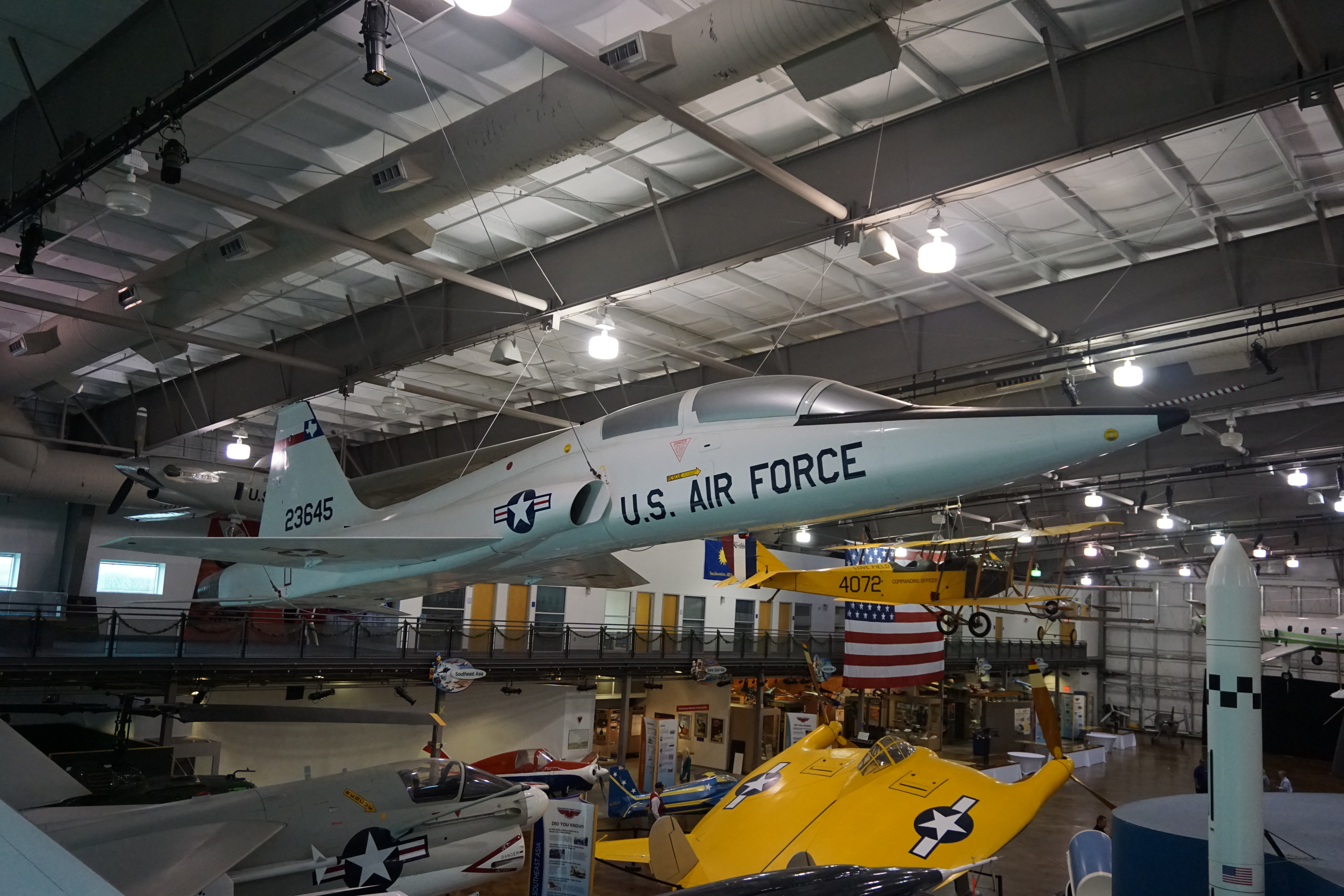
A T-38 Talon on display at the Frontiers of Flight Museum

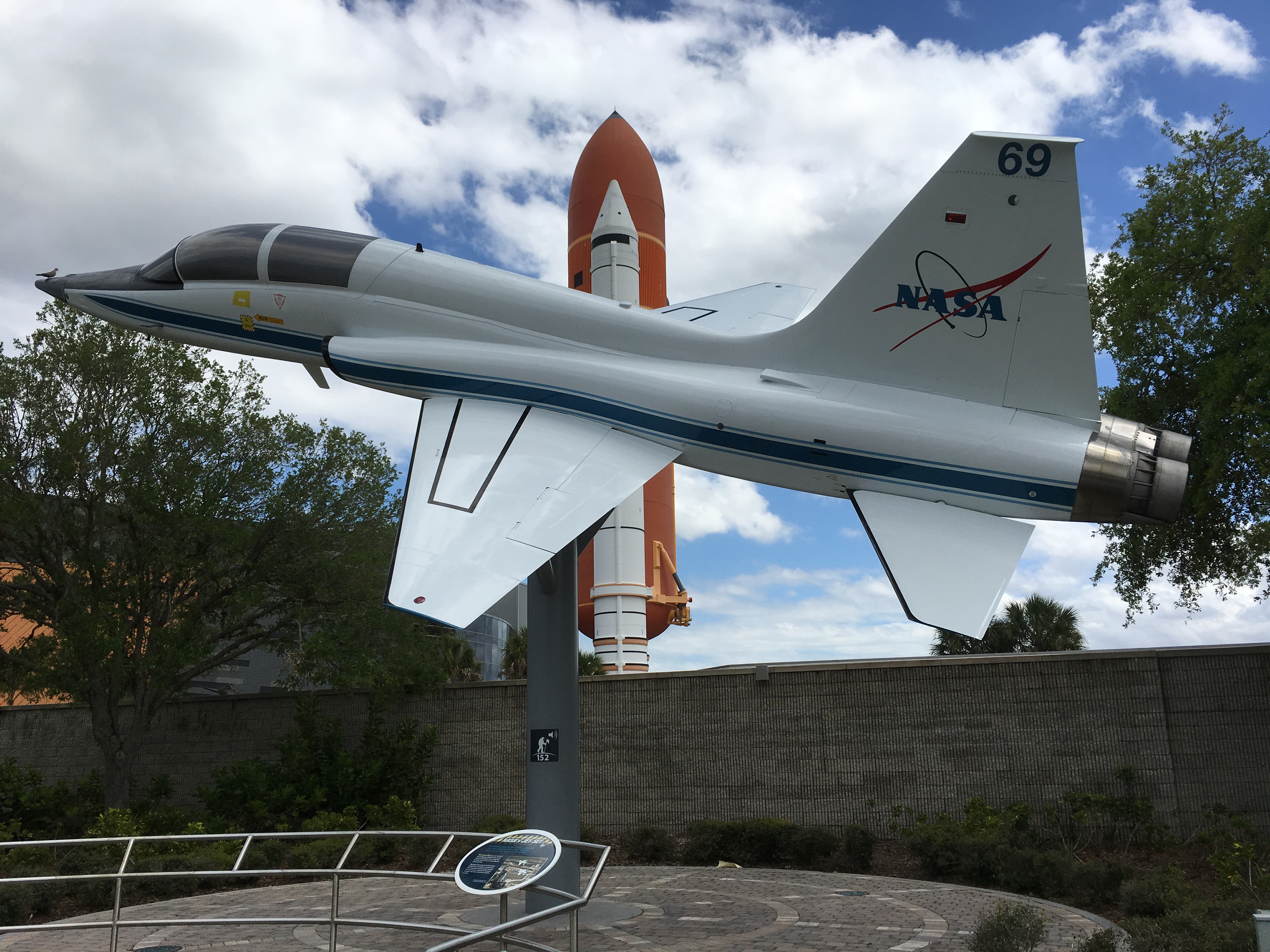
A T-38 Talon on display at the Kennedy Space Center Visitor Complex

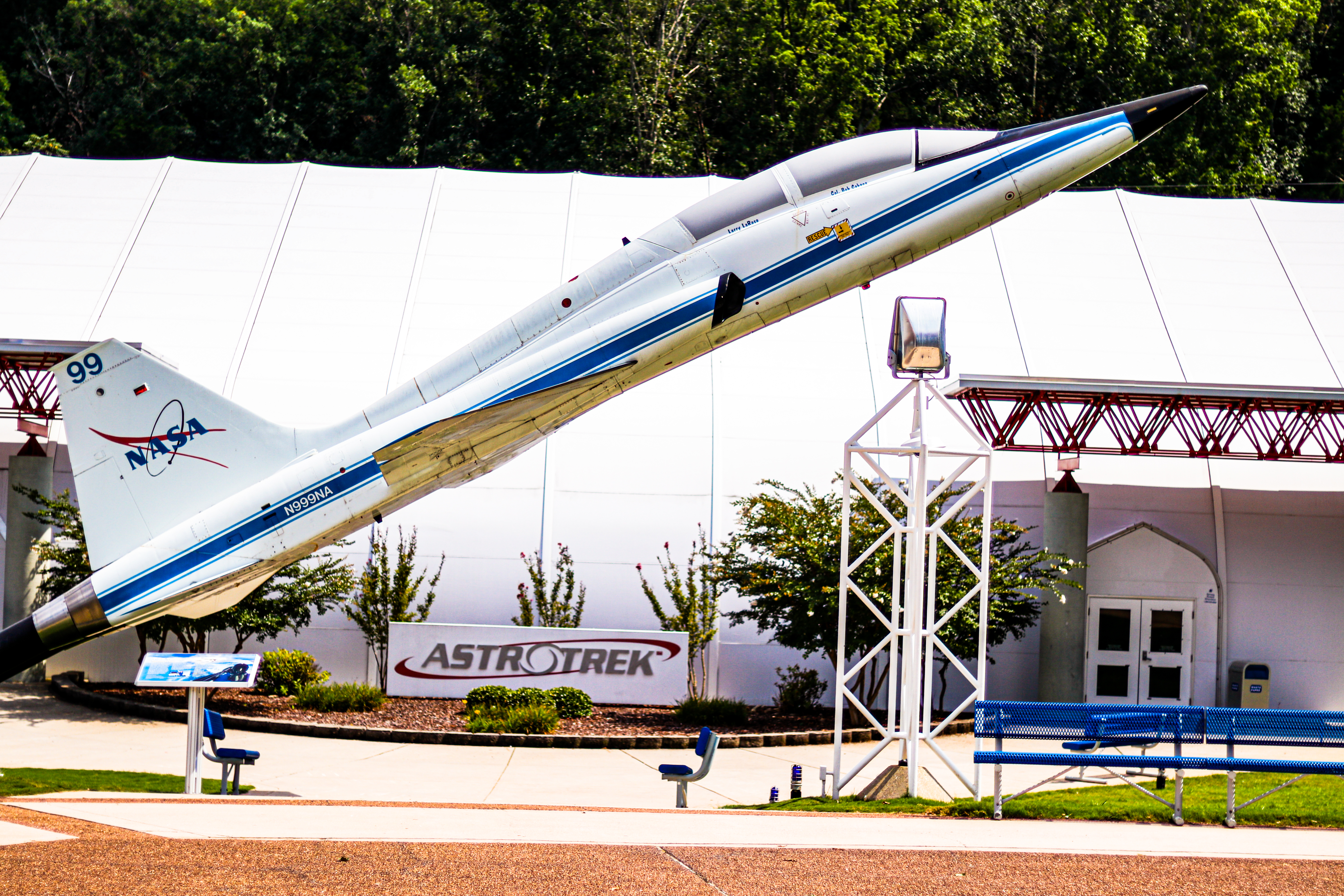
A T-38 Talon on display at the U.S. Space & Rocket Center

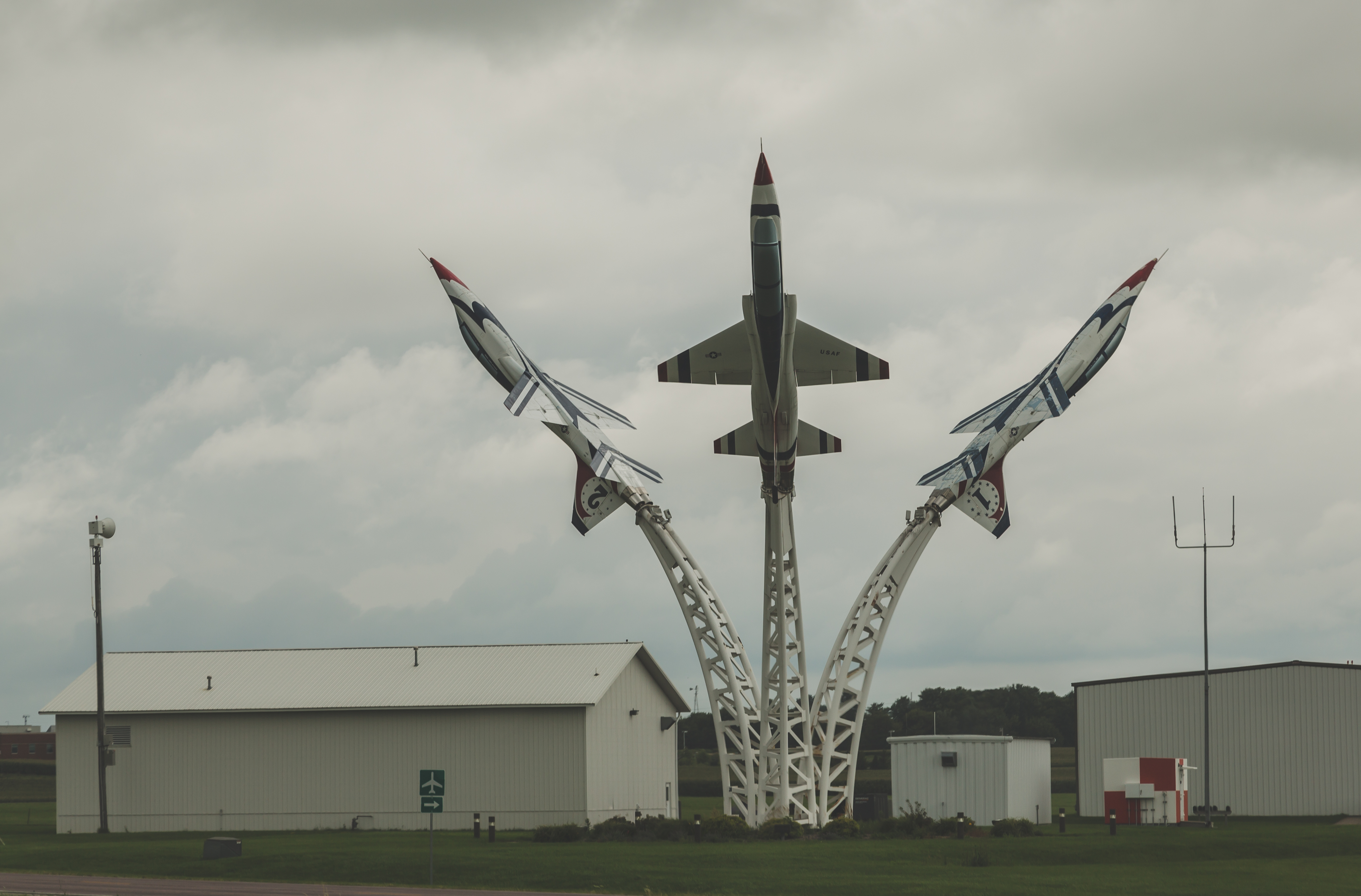
T-38 Serial Numbers 60–0573, 60–0589, and 61–0828 at Owatonna Degner Regional Airport, Minnesota

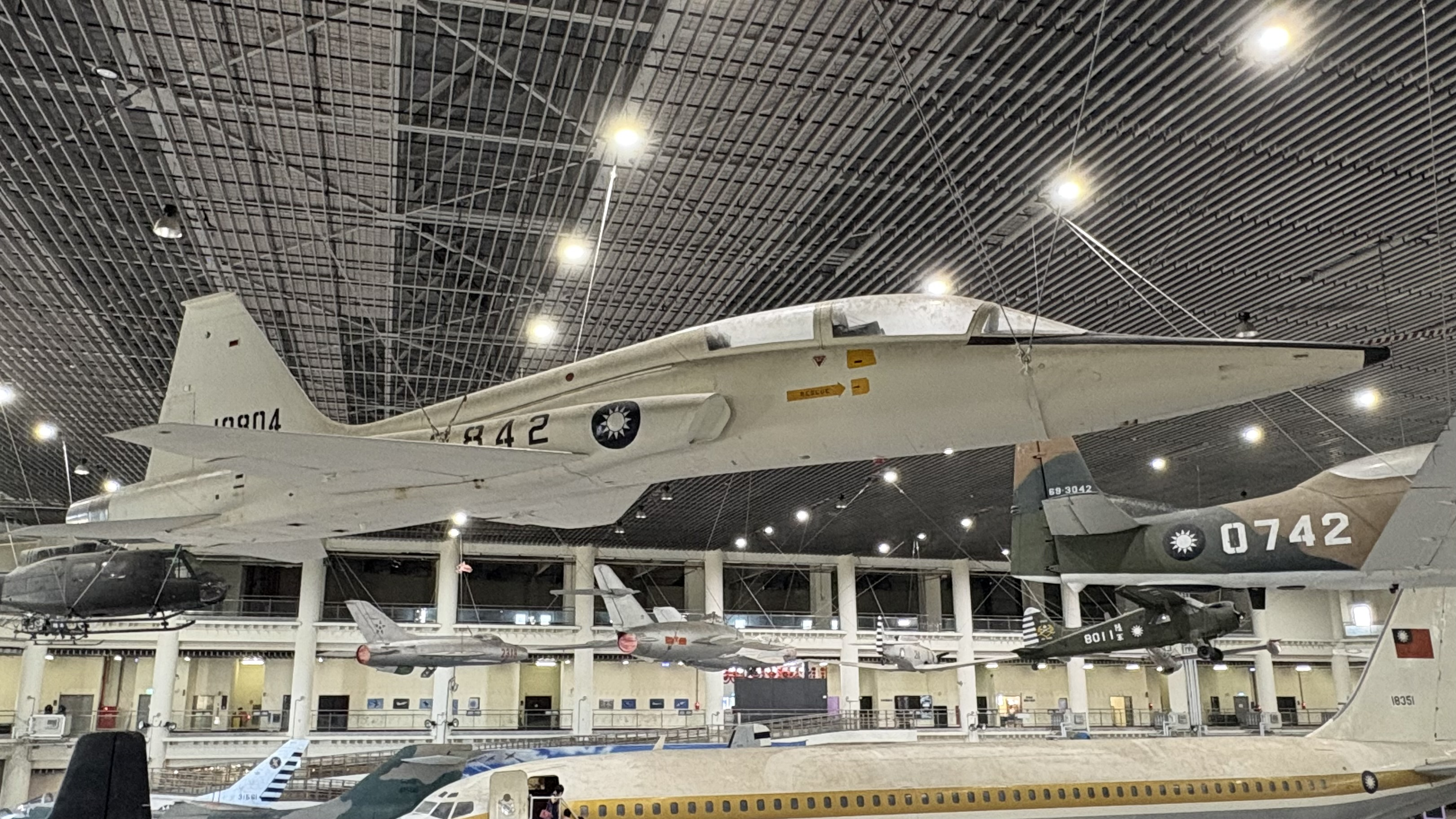
T-38A Serial Numbers 3842 at Gangshan Air Force Base, Gangshan District, Kaohsiung City, Taiwan

YT-38A

- 58-1192 – South Dakota Air and Space Museum at Ellsworth AFB, South Dakota.

T-38A

- 58-1196 – California Science Center, in Los Angeles, California.
- 59-1600 – Phoenix–Mesa Gateway Airport, Arizona.
- 59-1601 – On base display, Air University area, Maxwell AFB, Alabama.
- 59-1602 – On base display, United States Air Force Academy, in Colorado Springs, Colorado. Painted as "Thunderbird 1".
- 59-1604 – National Naval Aviation Museum, NAS Pensacola, Florida; former USAF aircraft bailed to USN and utilized by the U.S. Naval Test Pilot School at NAS Patuxent River, Maryland.
- 59-1605 – On base display, USAF Airman Heritage Museum, Lackland AFB, Texas.
- 60-0549 – Prairie Aviation Museum, in Bloomington, Illinois.
- 60-0551 – On display at the National Air and Space Museum in Washington, DC.
- 60-0558 – American Legion Post 233 in Edinburgh, Indiana.
- 60-0570 – Edward F. Beale Museum, Beale AFB, California.
- 60-0573 – On display, Owatonna Degner Regional Airport, Owatonna, Minnesota (with 60-0589 and 61–0828).
- 60-0574 – On base display, Laughlin AFB, Texas.
- 60-0583- On display, Mid-America Flight Museum, Liberal, Kansas.
- 60-0589 – On display, Owatonna Degner Regional Airport, Owatonna, Minnesota (with 60-0573 and 61–0828).
- 61-0817 – Oklahoma Welcome Station, adjacent to Tinker AFB, Oklahoma.
- 61-0825 – On display, U.S. Space & Rocket Center, Huntsville, Alabama (as N999NA, not original paint scheme). Appeared on Shipping Wars TV show being transported to Huntsville, Alabama, from NASA Houston.
- 61-0828 – On display, Owatonna Degner Regional Airport, Owatonna, Minnesota (with 60-0573 and 60–0589).
- 61-0829 – Gallup Municipal Airport, Gallup, New Mexico.
- 61-0838 – On base display, in front of Randolph Inn Visiting Officers Quarters (VOQ), Randolph AFB, Texas.
- 61-0854 – Pima Air and Space Museum, adjacent to Davis-Monthan AFB in Tucson, Arizona, on display in the markings of the 479th Tactical Training Wing at Holloman AFB, NM, circa 1982.
- 61-0858 – Sheppard AFB Air Park, Sheppard AFB, Texas.
- 61-0902 – Science Spectrum in Lubbock, Texas.
- 61-0926 – Salina Oklahoma, lawn of American Legion post #240
- 62-3673 – Mason County Airport (Michigan) Construction Number (C/N)- N.5378, built 1962, painted blue and gray camouflage static displayed on a pedestal along US10 showing USAF tail markings of the 434th Fighter Training Squadron when it was located at Holloman Air Force Base between 1977 and 1991.
- 63-8125 – Sheppard AFB Air Park, Sheppard AFB, Texas.
- 63-8224 – Evergreen Aviation & Space Museum in McMinnville, Oregon; painted in NASA colors, suspended from the ceiling in the Air and Space Exhibit Hall.
- 64-13198 – Hangar 25 Air Museum, (former Webb AFB) in Big Spring, Texas.
- 65-10405 – On base display, Columbus AFB, Mississippi
- 65-10426 – On base display, Vance AFB, Oklahoma
- 66-8381 / NASA 901 (N901NA) – Assigned directly to NASA as the second NASA T-38 to be designated as 'NASA 901' and 'N901NA'; on display at Aviation Heritage Park, Bowling Green, Kentucky.
- 3842- On Aviation Education Exhibition Hall display, Republic of China Air Force Gangshan Air Force Base.

GT-38A

- 60-0592 – Dyess Linear Air Park, Dyess AFB, Texas.
- 60-0593 – March Field Air Museum at March ARB (former March AFB) in Riverside, California, on display in Thunderbirds markings.
- 61-0824 – Hill Aerospace Museum adjacent to Hill AFB, Utah.

AT-38B

- 60-0576 – On base display, Holloman AFB, New Mexico.
- 65-10441 – National Museum of the United States Air Force at Wright-Patterson AFB in Dayton, Ohio. This aircraft was retired in 1991, came to the museum in 1999, and was placed on display in 2004.

T-38N

- 59-1603 / NASA 963 (N9693NA) - On display at the California Science Center, Los Angeles, California. Previously displayed at the Western Museum of Flight, Torrance, California.
- 65-10329 / NASA 969 (N969NA) – On display at Kennedy Space Center Visitor Complex, NASA/John F. Kennedy Space Center, Merritt Island, Florida.
- 65-10355 / NASA 913 (N913NA) – On display at the Intrepid Sea, Air & Space Museum, New York, New York.
- 65-10402 / NASA 968 (N968NA) – On display at Space Center Houston.
- 66-8381 / NASA 901 (N901NA) – Assigned directly to NASA as the second NASA T-38 to be designated as NASA 901 and N901NA; on display at Aviation Heritage Park, Bowling Green, Kentucky.

== Specifications (T-38A) ==
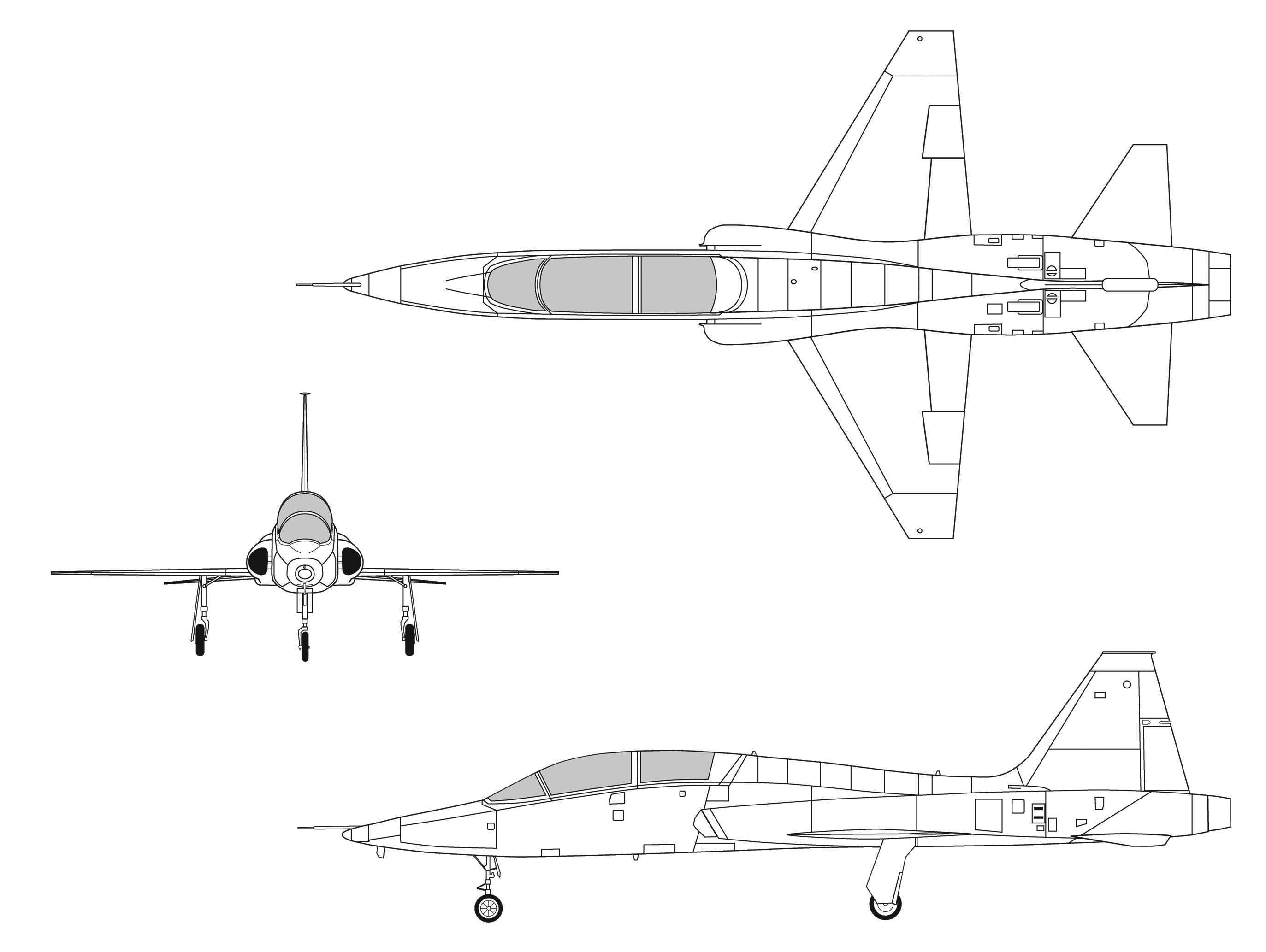

Data from USAF factsheet This Day In Aviation

General characteristics

- Crew: 2
- Length: 46 ft 4.5 in (14.135 m)
- Wingspan: 25 ft 3 in (7.70 m)
- Height: 12 ft 10.5 in (3.924 m)
- Wing area: 170 sq ft (16 m^{2})
- Empty weight: 7,200 lb (3,266 kg)
- Gross weight: 11,820 lb (5,361 kg)
- Max takeoff weight: 12,093 lb (5,485 kg)
- Powerplant: 2 × General Electric J85-5A afterburning turbojet engines, 2,680 lbf (11.9 kN) thrust each dry, 3,850 lbf (17.1 kN) with afterburner

Performance

- Maximum speed: 746 kn (858 mph, 1,382 km/h)
- Maximum speed: Mach 1.3
- Range: 991 nmi (1,140 mi, 1,835 km)
- Service ceiling: 50,000 ft (15,000 m)
- Rate of climb: 33,600 ft/min (171 m/s)
- Wing loading: 69.53 lb/sq ft (339.5 kg/m^{2})
- Thrust/weight: 0.65

== See also ==
- Boeing T-7 Red Hawk

Related development

- Northrop F-5
  - Canadair CF-5
- Northrop F-20 Tigershark

Related lists

- List of active United States military aircraft
- List of spaceflight-related accidents and incidents
