= East Coast Jets Flight 81 =

2008 aviation accident in Minnesota

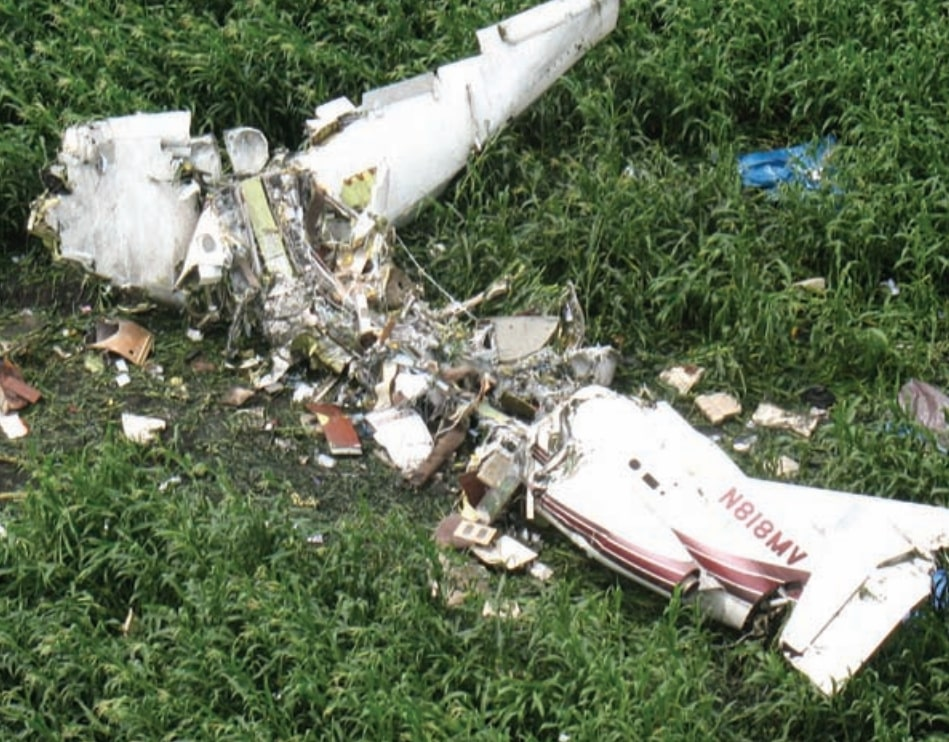
- Wreckage of the aircraft

Accident
- Date: July 31, 2008
- Summary: Runway excursion on landing after failed go-around attempt, pilot error
- Site: Near Owatonna Degner Regional Airport, Owatonna, Minnesota, United States; 44°7′49.98″N 93°16′29.29″W

Aircraft
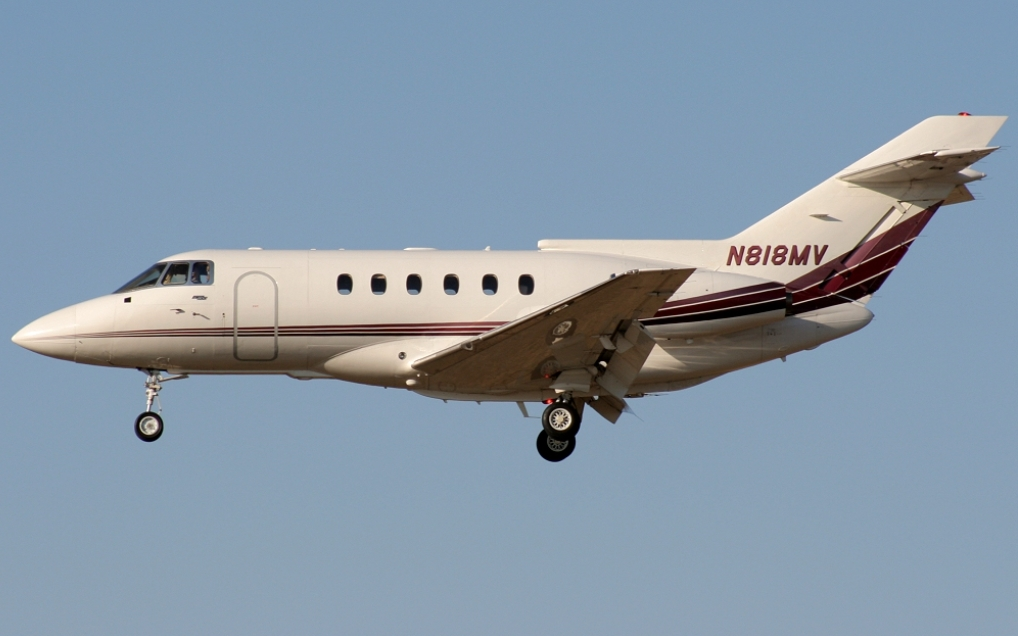
- N818MV, the aircraft involved in the accident, photographed in February 2007
- Aircraft type: Hawker 800
- Operator: East Coast Jets
- Call sign: EAST COAST JET 81
- Registration: N818MV
- Flight origin: Atlantic City International Airport, Atlantic City, New Jersey, United States
- Destination: Owatonna Degner Regional Airport, Owatonna, Minnesota, United States
- Occupants: 8
- Passengers: 6
- Crew: 2
- Fatalities: 8
- Survivors: 0

East Coast Jets Flight 81 was a business jet flight operated by East Coast Jets that crashed on July 31, 2008 while attempting a go-around at Owatonna Degner Regional Airport near Owatonna, Minnesota, killing all eight occupants on board. The flight originated in Atlantic City International Airport, and was scheduled to land in Owatonna. The crew made a go-around attempt after the aircraft touched down, but it overran the runway, hit the instrument landing system localizer antenna at an altitude of approximately 5 ft (1.5 m), stalled and crashed, with the main wreckage coming to rest 2,400 ft (730 m; 800 yd) from the runway end.

== Aircraft and crew ==
The aircraft operating the flight was a Hawker 800 registered as N818MV and manufactured in 1991. East Coast Jets began operating it in June 2003.

The captain was 40-year-old Clark Jon Keefer, a former flight instructor who had been with East Coast Jets since 2005. He had 3,600 flight hours including 1,188 hours on the Hawker 800. Keefer also had 874 hours on Learjet aircraft, totaling 2,062 flight hours on turbine-engine aircraft. The first officer was 27-year-old Daniel D'Ambrosio, who had been with East Coast Jets for less than a year and had previously worked for Colgan Air but quit during training due to an unexpected transfer of location. D'Ambrosio had 1,454 flight hours, with 295 of them on the Hawker 800. He also had two hours on Learjet aircraft, with a total of 297 hours on turbine-engine aircraft.

== Flight ==
After first traveling from its base airport at Lehigh Valley International Airport to Atlantic City to pick up passengers, East Coast Jets Flight 81 departed from Atlantic City International Airport at 8:13 am, en route to its destination, Owatonna Degner Regional Airport in Minnesota.

== Accident ==
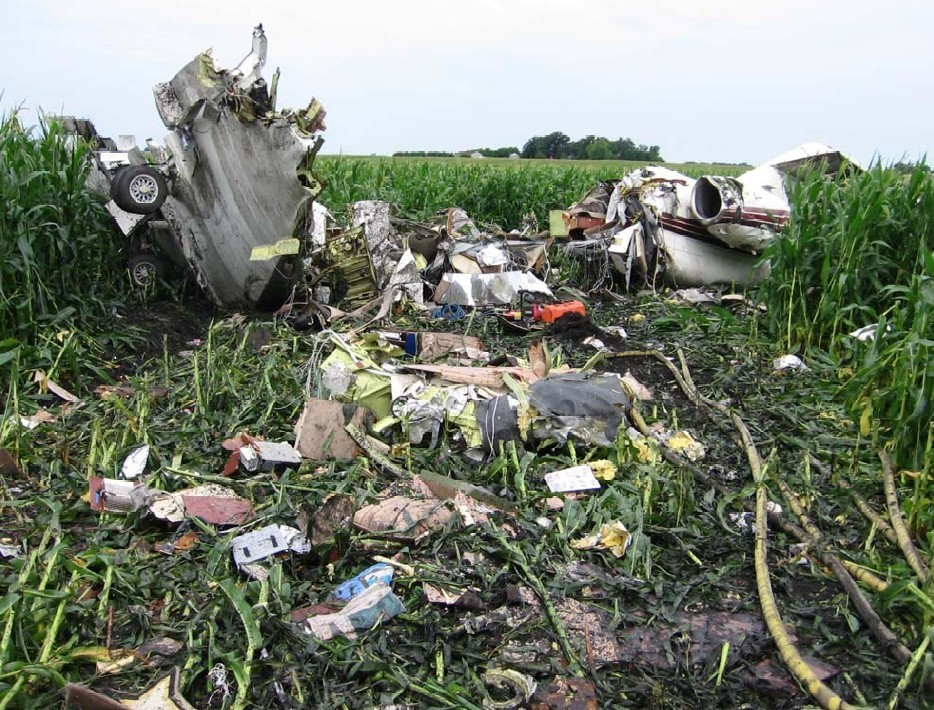
Another angle of the wreckage

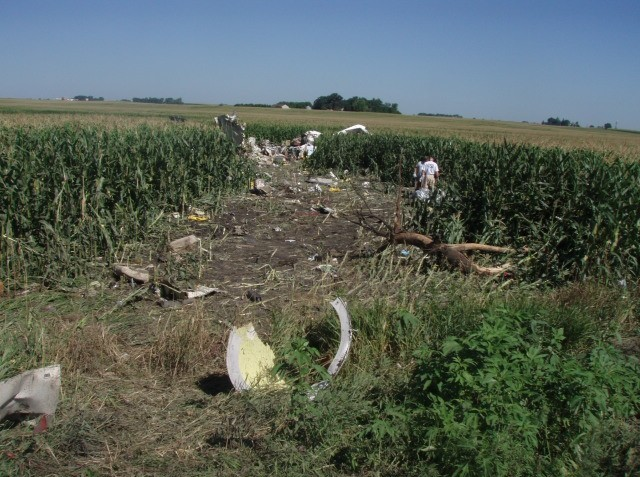
N818MV when the aircraft slid through the field

At 9:45 am, Flight 81 was cleared for landing, and the aircraft touched down on assigned runway 30. Noticing that insufficient runway length remained for the jet to stop, the crew decided to go-around. As it began to take off again, the aircraft overran the end of the runway, and the right wing impacted elements of the approach lighting system. This caused the aircraft to bank hard to the right until it was upside down before crashing into a cornfield 2,400 ft (730 m; 800 yd) from the runway. Seven occupants died on impact. One passenger initially survived the crash, but she died less than two hours later in a hospital.

== Investigation ==
The National Transportation Safety Board (NTSB) investigators concluded that the aircraft crashed due to a failed go-around. As the jet had no flight data recorder on board, NTSB investigators used the aircraft's cockpit voice recorder and eyewitness accounts. Possible hydroplaning due to the wet runway was discussed but ruled out later on. Investigators determined that the pilots had not begun the go-around earlier before overrunning Runway 30. The pilots failed to apply full brakes and moved the airbrake handle to the OPEN position (airbrakes only partially extended) instead of first selecting flaps 45 degrees and then the proper airbrake DUMP position (making airbrakes fully extended and flaps extended further to 75 degrees) during the landing, which would have safely brought the aircraft to a stop even after it overran the runway. The pilots were also criticized because they continued their attempt to go-around after overrunning the runway. The NTSB cited the pilots' error in attempting a go-around as the primary cause of the accident, concluding that the aircraft would have come to rest within the runway safety margins. The NTSB cited other contributing causes and issued a series of recommendations.

=== Probable cause ===
The NTSB's final report states the following:

The National Transportation Safety Board determines that the probable cause of this accident was the captain's decision to attempt a go-around late in the landing roll with insufficient runway remaining. Contributing to the accident were, 1, the pilots' poor crew coordination and lack of cockpit discipline; 2, fatigue, which likely impaired both pilots' performance; and 3, the failure of the Federal Aviation Administration to require crew resource management training and standard operating procedures for Part 135 operators.

The NTSB issued 14 Safety Recommendations as a result of this accident.

== Aftermath ==
The six passengers on board were all connected with the construction of Atlantic City's gigantic Revel Casino, the city's tallest building, which was under construction at the time. They had flown to Minnesota to meet with the glass-walled project's glass manufacturer. Wrongful death actions were filed on behalf of the passengers' families and were settled around the same time as the NTSB's report. The casino was described by some as a "memorial" to the flight's passengers.

== See also ==
- China Airlines Flight 140, an A300 stalled by the pilots during a go-around.
- TAM Airlines Flight 3054, an A320 failed to stop after touchdown and overran the runway due to mistakes made by the pilots with fatal consequences in July 2007.
- 2023 Manaus Aerotáxi Embraer Bandeirante crash, an Embraer 110 Bandeirante that crashed when attempting to land at Barcelos Airport while performing a go-around.
