= Owatonna Degner Regional Airport =

Airport serving Owatonna, Minnesota, United States

- IATA: OWA; ICAO: KOWA; FAA LID: OWA

Summary
- Airport type: Public
- Owner: City of Owatonna, Minnesota
- Serves: Owatonna, Minnesota
- Elevation AMSL: 1,146 ft / 349 m
- Coordinates: 44°07′24″N 93°15′36″W
- Website: Owatonna Degner Regional Airport

Map

Runways
| Direction | Length | | Surface |
| Direction | ft | m | Surface |
|---|---|---|---|
| 12/30 | 5,500 | 1,676 | Concrete |
| 5/23 | 3,000 | 914 | Asphalt |

Statistics (2018)
- Aircraft operations: 29,930
- Based aircraft: 44
- Source: Federal Aviation Administration

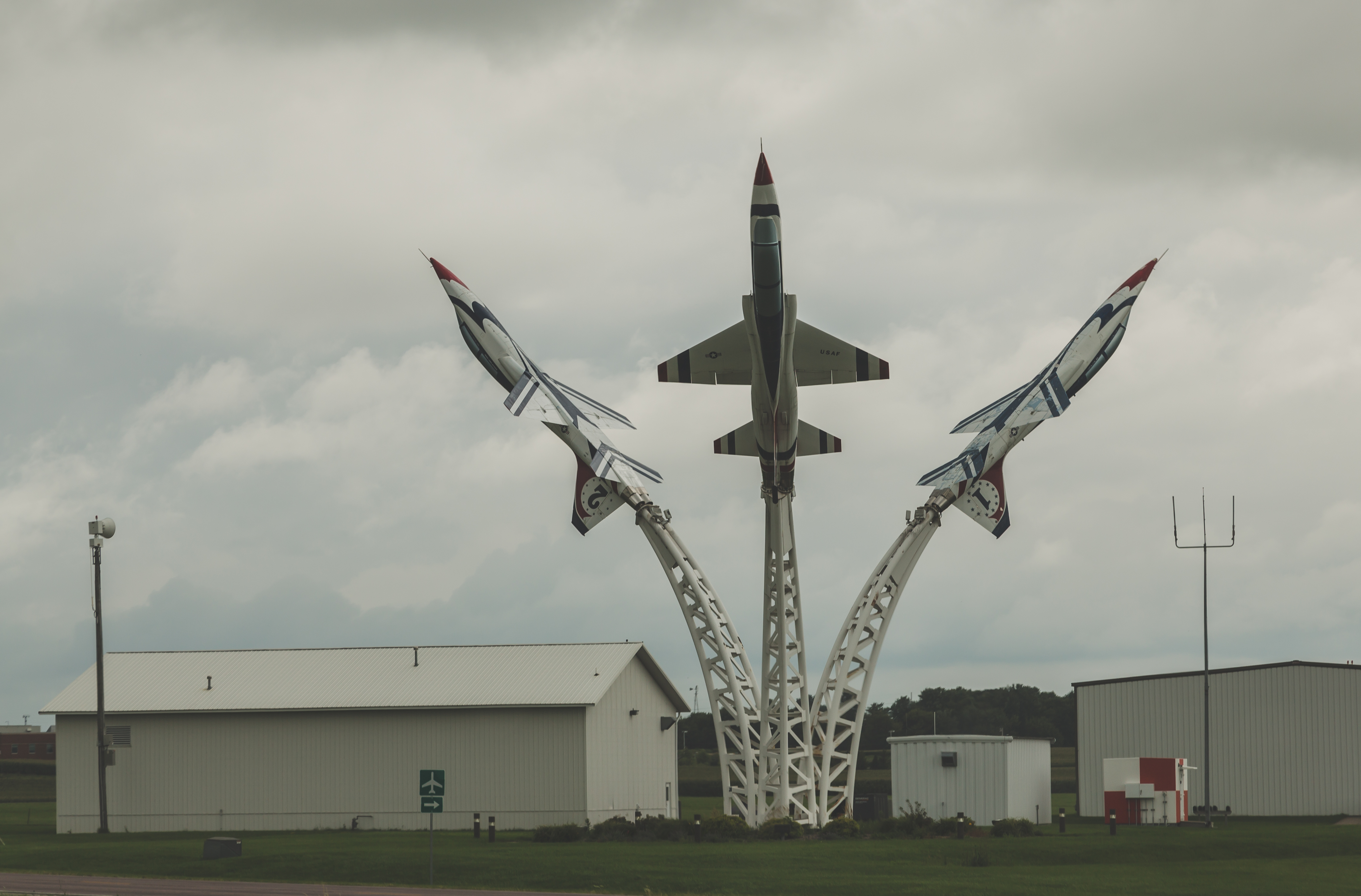
Sculpture of three retired USAF T-38A Talons at Owatonna Degner Regional Airport

Owatonna Degner Regional Airport (IATA: OWA, ICAO: KOWA, FAA LID: OWA) is three miles northwest of Owatonna, in Steele County, Minnesota. Its IATA identifier "OWA" comes from the first three letters of the city of Owatonna. The airport is used for general aviation.

== History ==
Airport construction started in 1946. It was completed and the airport opened in 1947 with four unpaved runways. In 1987 the City Council of Owatonna renamed the airport Glenn J. Degner Airfield, after one of the original aviation pioneers of Owatonna. In the 1990s, the concrete runway was lengthened to 5,500 feet (1,700 m) and an instrument landing system was added. The airport was renamed The Owatonna Degner Regional Airport in August 1999.

== Accidents ==
East Coast Jets Flight 81 was a business jet flight operated by East Coast Jets and destined for Owatonna. The plane crashed on July 31, 2008, while attempting a go-around at the airport, killing all eight passengers and crew on board.

== See also ==
- List of airports in Minnesota
