= Sea Breaker =

Israeli anti-ship or land attack cruise missile

Sea/Ice Breaker
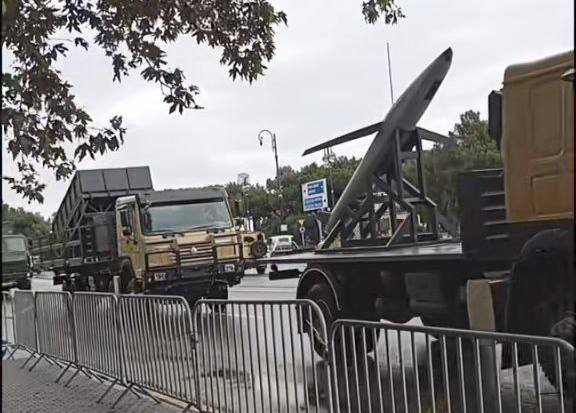
- Sea Breaker missile with ground launch canisters in the background
- Type: Anti-ship missile Land-attack missile Surface-to-surface missile
- Place of origin: Israel

Production history
- Designer: Rafael Advanced Defense Systems
- Manufacturer: Rafael Advanced Defense Systems; Bharat Dynamics Limited
- Variants: Ship-launched; Surface-launched; Air-launched

Specifications
- Mass: 400 kg (880 lb)
- Length: 4 m (13 ft)
- Diameter: 0.35 m (1.1 ft)
- Warhead: 113 kg (249 lb)
- Engine: TRI-60 Turbojet
- Operational range: 300 km (190 mi; 160 nmi)
- Flight altitude: Sea skimming
- Maximum speed: High Subsonic
- Guidance system: GPS/INS/TERCOM+IIR
- Launch platform: Warships; Land-mobile launchers Fighter aircraft

Sea Breaker is a fifth generation precision-guided, autonomous, long-range anti ship and land attack missile system. It is being designed and developed by Rafael Advanced Defence Systems. It can be launched from either ships or land. The air launched version of this missile is known as Ice Breaker.

Bullseye is a missile derived from the Sea Breaker and built by General Atomics.

== Development ==
Rafael Advanced Defense Systems began work on the Sea Breaker in the late 2010s as a successor to its earlier Gabriel and Spike missile families. The project aimed to produce a fifth-generation, precision-guided weapon capable of striking maritime and land targets at stand-off ranges while operating in GNSS-denied environments. The missile was formally unveiled on 30 June 2021. During development, Rafael incorporated an advanced IIR (Imaging Infrared) seeker, ATR (Automatic Target Recognition) and AI–based guidance algorithms, as well as a two-way data link to allow in-flight retargeting and battle-damage assessment. The system was designed for launch from surface vessels and land-based launchers, with a stated range of up to 300 km and a 113 kg (250 lb) warhead.

Building on the Sea Breaker programme, Rafael developed an air-launched variant under the name Ice Breaker. This version was designed to provide similar capabilities to fixed-wing and rotary-wing aircraft, maintaining a high degree of commonality with the naval and land variants. Ice Breaker was first shown publicly at the Farnborough International Airshow in July 2022. The missile retained the Sea Breaker’s IIR seeker, GNSS-independent navigation, electronic countermeasure resistance and mid-course data link, while being optimised for carriage under aircraft pylons.

Rafael has claimed that by 2023 the Ice Breaker family had created more than $1 billion in revenue, and by 2024 the company had orders for over 1,000 missiles from six customers.

== Manufacturing ==
In order to facilitate the manufacturing of the Ice Breaker stand-off air-to-surface missile in India, Bharat Dynamics Limited and Rafael Advanced Defense Systems signed a memorandum of understanding during Aero India 2025. The missile will be customized to meet the Indian Armed Forces' specific operational requirements. With a few minor avionics and store certification changes, the platforms that can support the Spice 1000 can incorporate the Ice Breaker. The HAL Prachand can carry two missiles, while fixed-wing aircraft like the HAL Tejas and Mikoyan MiG-29K can carry up to four.

== Operators ==
- Azerbaijan
- India

== See also ==
- AGM-158C LRASM – (United States)
- Atmaca – (Turkey)
- C-802 – (China)
- Exocet – (France)
- Harpoon – (United States)
- Hsiung Feng II – (Taiwan)
- Hsiung Feng III – (Taiwan)
- Kh-35 – (Russia)
- Naval Strike Missile – (Norway)
- Otomat – (Italy, France)
- R-360 Neptune – (Ukraine)
- RBS 15 – (Sweden)
- Sea Eagle – (United Kingdom)
- SSM-700K C-Star – (South Korea)
- Type 80 air-to-ship missile – (Japan)
- Type 88 surface-to-ship missile – (Japan)
- Type 90 ship-to-ship missile – (Japan)
- Type 93 air-to-ship missile – (Japan)
