= Sea Eagle (missile) =

- A drawing of the Sea Eagle
- Type: Anti-ship missile
- Place of origin: United Kingdom

Service history
- In service: 1985-present
- Used by: See operators

Production history
- Designer: BAe Dynamics
- Designed: 1976
- Manufacturer: BAe Dynamics (1982–1999); MBDA (UK) Ltd (since 1999)
- Produced: 1982
- Variants: Sea Eagle SL (surface-launched) tested, others proposed.

Specifications
- Mass: 580 kg
- Length: 4.14 m
- Diameter: 0.4 m
- Wingspan: 1.2 m
- Warhead weight: 230 kg
- Engine: Turbojet
- Operational range: 110 km +
- Maximum speed: Mach 1+
- Guidance system: Inertial, with active radar homing
- Steering system: Control surface
- Launch platform: Fixed and rotary wing aircraft

The BAe Sea Eagle is a medium-weight sea-skimming anti-ship missile designed and built by BAe Dynamics (now MBDA). It is designed to sink or disable ships up to the size of aircraft carriers in the face of jamming and other countermeasures including decoys. Its users include the Royal Air Force and Royal Navy, the Royal Saudi Air Force, and the Indian Navy.

== History ==
=== Previous systems ===
The anti-ship version of the Martel missile entered service with the RAF in October 1972 and the Royal Navy one year later. These missiles were designed around a television guidance system using a camera in the nose of the missile that sent its image back to the launch aircraft via a data link radio system. The weapons officer in the aircraft, normally the Blackburn Buccaneer, used the image to guide the missile via signals sent back to the missile on the same data link. This method of operation had been chosen for its simplicity; in comparison, an active radar seeker would be prone to all sorts of countermeasures, including chaff and active jamming systems, and would require some form of navigation system for the approach while the missile was still under the radar horizon.

The desire for a ship-launched anti-ship missile led to some consideration of an active seeker for the Martel, under the name Ship Martel (or Active Martel). As the launching ship would be under the radar horizon of the target, a data link or similar solution that required a line-of-sight would not work. Marconi won the contract for the radar seeker, a very simple one-axis (left-right) seeker that they claimed would be much less expensive than the Adac seeker of Exocet or the RE576 used on the AS.34 Kormoran and Otomat. A small rocket booster would be used to launch the missile before starting the original engine. This role was ultimately filled by the Exocet and development ended.

The Ship Martel work was later picked up for a submarine-launched anti-ship missile, a project known as CL.137 USGW (Under-Sea Guided Weapon). (Note: Hawker Siddeley Dynamics held an internal contest to name the missile, won by "Swordfish".) This consisted of a Sea Martel with modifications to allow it to fit into a normal 21-inch torpedo tube, using folding wings and fins. The Marconi seeker was used, but was not fitted during testing. Instead, a simple autopilot with a radar altimeter was used in testing at Aberporth. A further adaptation was the Sub Martel, otherwise similar but using the Adac seeker from the Exocet, a sub-launched development of the Exocet itself having been abandoned for cost reasons. Ultimately the USGW contest was won by the Sub-Harpoon in September 1975.

=== Sea Eagle ===
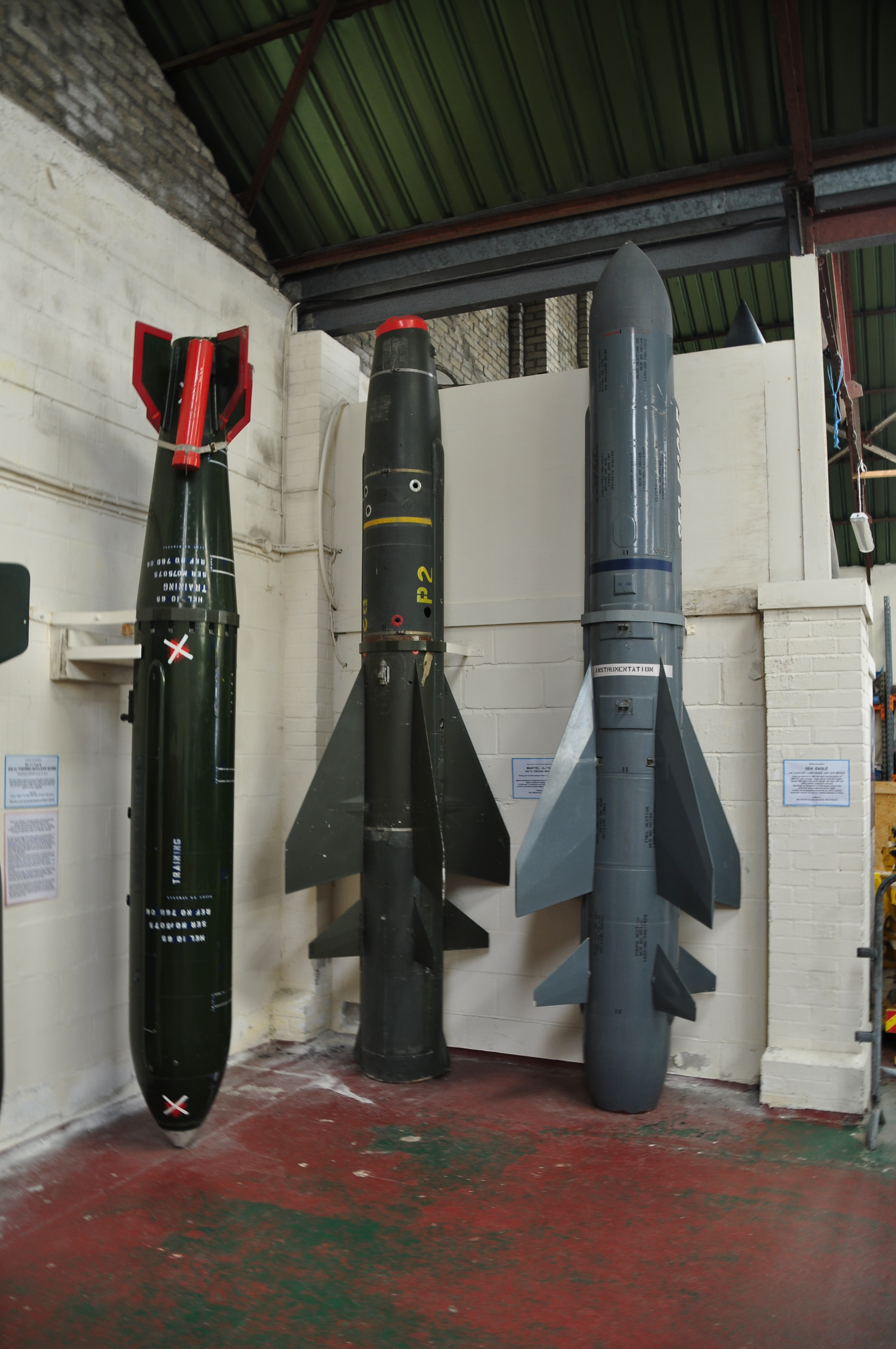
Sea Eagle on the right, next to a Martel in the center. The similarity of the designs is evident. The weapon on the left is a WE177A.

These developments all suggested the TV-guided Martel was no longer competitive, and a series of studies during 1973 to 1975 came up with specifications for its replacement. This was known as Air Staff Target (AST) 1226 in the Air Force, and Naval Staff Target (NST) 6451 in the Navy. This called for a missile with greater range than Ship Martel, which required the switch to a jet engine. Hawker Siddeley submitted a design using the Marconi seeker and a more highly modified version of the Martel airframe. This would have the advantage of being able to be fired from any aircraft already able to fire the TV-guided Martel.

Design of the P3T began in 1976, with full scale development initiated in 1979. Although the resulting design looked like the Martel, almost all components differ, with a longer body, larger wings and totally different internal components. A ship-launched version, the P5T Sea Eagle SL, was proposed in 1981. This added two solid-fuel boosters on either side of the missile body, but was otherwise similar to the P3T. It was designed to be fired from its sealed shipping box. The same box was used for the proposed Lightweight Sea Dart, allowing a ship to carry either or both on the same launcher. One advantage to the SL version over competing designs was that it could be fired at very close targets, while most designs, like Harpoon and Exocet, had a fairly long minimum range. Another advantage was that the same missile could be fired from helicopters, like the original Martel, as the rockets could launch it from the helicopter even at very low altitudes without needing high forward speed to allow the small wings to maintain altitude.

Production of the finished production weapon began in 1982, around the same time that the name Sea Eagle was bestowed, with test firings up to 1984 and service introduction the following year. The RAF Buccaneer was the first aircraft to carry a Sea Eagle in active service. This was followed by the Royal Navy's Sea Harrier, as well as the Tornado GR1B in the RAF (replacing Buccaneers) and Royal Saudi Air Force. The Indian Navy also equipped its Sea Harrier FRS Mk.51 and Jaguar IM with the missile, as well as twenty Sea King Mk.42B helicopters, using a version with two booster rockets either side of the rear fuselage. Indian Ilyushin Il-38 maritime patrol aircraft were also equipped with the rocket-boosted version of the missile, carried on unusual side-fuselage pylons aft of each wing. It has also been reported that India sought to equip its Tupolev Tu-142 fleet with the missile. The Chilean Air Force has trial fitted its A-36M Halcon (CASA 101 Aviojet) with the missile, but this combination never entered service. Several variants of the BAE Hawk trainer/light fighter have carried the missile on trials.

The Sea Eagle was withdrawn from service with the RAF and Royal Navy by 2000.

== Design ==
Sea Eagle is powered by a licence-built, paraffin-fuelled Microturbo TRI 60 turbojet and cruises at speeds of Mach 0.85 (1,040 km/h, 645 mph) throughout its 110 kilometre (68 mile) plus range. It is capable of being carried at supersonic speeds by its parent aircraft, with launch at speeds of up to Mach 0.9 and a wide range of altitudes. Ejector launch, typically from a Type 119 Mk 5 ERU, with a pylon adapter where needed, is used.

Once launched the Sea Eagle is completely autonomous, with the flight and target seeking completely controlled by the on-board computer system which functions according to programmable options covering a large set of cruise, search and attack options, including a simple, pre-programmed 'point and shoot' mode that allows it to be carried by basic aircraft without radar, using targeting information radioed to the pilot from external sources or even visually located by him, with the missile's short minimum range assisting this. Other modes integrate with more sophisticated weapon systems and sensors and allow Sea Eagle to be programmed during flight by the parent aircraft using targeting data from the aircraft's on board radar sensors or via off-board data-link networks. 'Dog leg' routes can be programmed into the missile's computer to allow a salvo of missiles to arrive from different directions, saturating the target's defences. A twin-gyro attitude reference system, digital flight control computer and autopilot are used to give the missile an over-the-horizon capability. A C-band radar altimeter allows the missile to fly at very low level, minimising the range at which a ship can detect it. The J-band active radar target seeker can detect targets up to 30 km away, allowing a mid-course update of target position through a 'pop up' manoeuvre if required. The guidance system was developed by GEC-Marconi at Stanmore.

The main wings are essentially of delta form, arranged in a cruciform configuration. Smaller tails surfaces of similar shape and configuration provide steering. The engine intake is under the fuselage - whilst carried by an aircraft this is covered by an aerodynamic fairing which is blown clear at launch. The missile is fitted with a powerful semi-armour-piercing warhead, with a high ratio of charge to total weight, encased in a tough metal alloy casing. Residual turbojet fuel adds to the warhead's destructive effects on impact with the target.

Sea Eagle is stored as a 'round of ammunition', with inspection every two years or so, and a life of at least 15 years. When stored the wings and tail surfaces are removed, but the weapon can be kept fully fuelled.

== Variants ==
A variant of the missile, called Sea Eagle SL (also P5T), designed to be launched from boxes mounted on ships was tested. It used the same rocket boosters as applied to the helicopter-launched version, but lost out to the American Harpoon missile in a 1984 competition to arm the Royal Navy's Type 22 Batch 3 and Type 23 frigates. This version was also intended to have been used in shore-based batteries. The only external difference from the air-launched version was the use of launcher shoes for rail mounting in the launch box, as opposed to the air-launched version's ejector lugs.

An unbuilt air-launched, land attack version of Sea Eagle, using a similar nose radar and semi-armour-piercing warhead, was known as P4T. A later proposed land attack variant which would have had an imaging infrared or millimetre wave radar seeker-head and a data link to allow the launch platform to update the missile in flight was studied around 1990; this version was dubbed "Golden Eagle" and would have had a penetrator warhead to allow attacks on land-based hardened targets.

A proposed update of Sea Eagle in the mid-1990s with a dual-band seeker and improved systems was abandoned on cost grounds.

== Specifications ==
- Wingspan : 1.2 metres (3 feet 11 inches)
- Length : 4.14 metres (13 feet 7 inches)
- Body Diameter : 0.4 metres (1 foot 4 inches)
- Weight : 580 kilograms (1,279 pounds)
- Warhead : 230 kilograms (510 pounds) of PBX (semi armour-piercing)
- Speed : Mach 1 (645 mph)
- Range : 110 kilometres (68 miles / 60 nautical miles) plus
- Flight time : 400 seconds (6 min 40 seconds)

== Operators ==
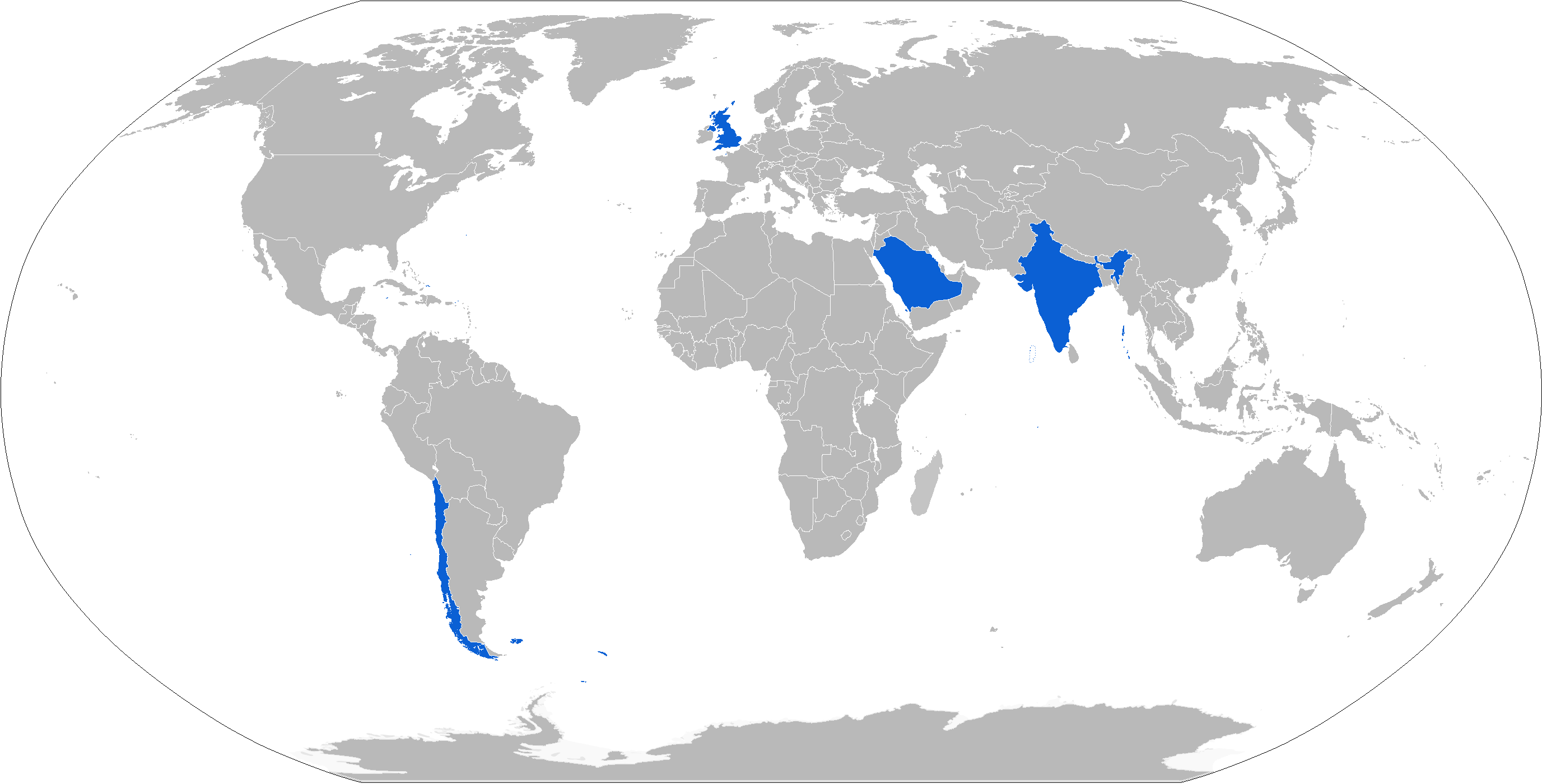
Map with Sea Eagle operators in blue

United Kingdom

Royal Air Force and Royal Navy

- Blackburn Buccaneer (retired) - 2 or 4 missiles
- Tornado GR.1B (retired) - 2 or 4 missiles
- Sea Harrier FRS.1/FA.2 (retired) - 2 missiles
- BAe Hawk - 1 missile (Trial only)

India

Indian Air Force and Indian Navy

- Sea Harrier FRS Mk.51 (retired) - 2 missiles
- Sea King Mk.42B - 2 missiles
- Jaguar IM - 1 or 2 missiles
- Ilyushin Il-38 (retired) - 2 missiles
- Tupolev Tu-142 (retired) - 4? missiles

Saudi Arabia

Royal Saudi Air Force

- Tornado IDS (retired?) - 2 or 4 missiles

Chile

- A-36M Halcon (CASA 101 Aviojet) (trials only) - 2 missiles

== See also ==
- Kh-35 – (Russia)
- Babur – (Pakistan)
- Harpoon – (United States)
- AGM-158C LRASM – (United States)
- Exocet – (France)
- Naval Strike Missile – (Norway)
- RBS 15 – (Sweden)
- C-802 – (China)
- ASM-3 – (Japan)
- Type 80 air-to-ship missile – (Japan)
- Type 88 surface-to-ship missile – (Japan)
- Type 90 ship-to-ship missile – (Japan)
- Type 93 air-to-ship missile – (Japan)
- NASM-SR – (India)
