= Harpoon (missile) =

U.S. anti-ship missile

A/R/UGM-84 Harpoon
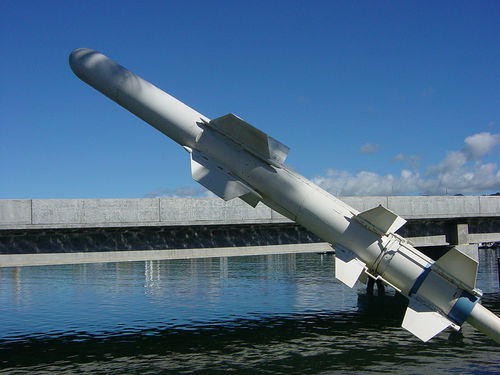
- Type: Anti-ship missile
- Place of origin: United States

Service history
- In service: 1977–present
- Used by: See operators
- Wars: Iran–Iraq War; Russo-Ukrainian War

Production history
- Manufacturer: McDonnell Douglas; Boeing Defense, Space & Security
- Unit cost: US$1,406,812 for Harpoon Block II (2020)
- No. built: 7,500

Specifications
- Mass: 1,523 lb (691 kg) including booster
- Length: 12.6 ft (3.8 m), air-launched; 15 ft (4.6 m), surface- and submarine-launched
- Diameter: 13.5 in (34 cm)
- Wingspan: 3 ft (0.91 m)
- Warhead: 488 pounds (221 kg)
- Detonation mechanism: Impact fuze
- Engine: Teledyne CAE J402 turbojet/solid propellant booster for surface and submarine launch; greater than 600 lb_{f} (2,700 N) of thrust
- Operational range: Greater than 77 nmi (143 km), ship-launched Harpoon Block I & Block IC; Greater than 67 nmi (124 km), ship-launched Harpoon Block II; 120 nmi (220 km), air-launched Block IC
- Flight altitude: Sea-skimming
- Maximum speed: 537 mph (864 km/h; 240 m/s; Mach 0.71), ship-launched Harpoon Block I & air-launched Harpoon Block IC; Greater than 537 mph (864 km/h; 240 m/s; Mach 0.71), ship-launched Harpoon Block IC & Block II
- Guidance system: Sea-skimming cruise monitored by radar altimeter, active radar terminal homing.
- Launch platform: RGM-84A surface ship/TEL-launched; AGM-84A air-launched; UGM-84A submarine-launched

The Harpoon is an all-weather, over-the-horizon, anti-ship missile manufactured by McDonnell Douglas (now Boeing Defense, Space & Security). The AGM-84E Standoff Land Attack Missile (SLAM) and later AGM-84H/K SLAM-ER (Standoff Land Attack Missile – Expanded Response) are cruise missile variants.

The regular Harpoon uses active radar homing and flies just above the water to evade defenses. The missile can be launched from:

- Fixed-wing aircraft (AGM-84), without the solid-fuel rocket booster
- Surface ships (RGM-84), fitted with a solid-fuel rocket booster that detaches when expended, to allow the missile's main turbojet to maintain flight
- Submarines (UGM-84), fitted with a solid-fuel rocket booster and encapsulated in a container to enable submerged launch through a torpedo tube
- Coastal defense batteries (RGM-84), from which it would be fired with a solid-fuel rocket booster

== Development ==
In 1965, the United States Navy began studies for a missile in the 24-nautical-mile (45 km) range class for use against surfaced submarines. The name Harpoon was assigned to the project. The sinking of the Israeli destroyer Eilat in 1967 by a Soviet-built Styx anti-ship missile shocked senior United States Navy officers, who until then had not appreciated the threat posed by anti-ship missiles. In 1970 Chief of Naval Operations Admiral Elmo Zumwalt accelerated the development of Harpoon as part of his "Project Sixty" initiative, hoping to add much-needed striking power to U.S. surface warships such as the Ticonderoga-class cruiser.

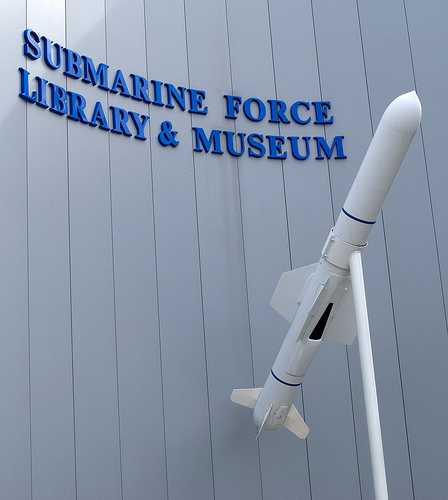
Air intake (black triangle) for turbojet is visible on the underside

The first Harpoon was delivered in 1977; in 2004, Boeing delivered the 7,000th.

The Harpoon has also been adapted for carriage on several aircraft, including the P-3 Orion, the P-8 Poseidon, the AV-8B Harrier II, the F/A-18 Hornet and the U.S. Air Force B-52H bombers. The Harpoon was purchased by many nations, including India, Japan, Singapore, South Korea, Taiwan, the United Arab Emirates and most NATO countries.

The Royal Australian Air Force can fire AGM-84-series missiles from its F/A-18F Super Hornets. AP-3C Orion, and P-8 Poseidon aircraft, and previously from the now retired F-111C/Gs and F/A-18A/B Hornets. The Royal Australian Navy deploys the Harpoon on major surface combatants and in the Collins-class submarines. The Spanish Air Force and the Chilean Navy are also AGM-84D customers, and they deploy the missiles on surface ships, and F/A-18s, F-16 Falcons, and P-3 Orion aircraft. The British Royal Navy formerly deployed the Harpoon on several types of surface ships, they were phased out starting in 2023 and replaced with the Naval Strike Missile which has twice the range of a Harpoon and is about 20% faster.

The Royal Canadian Navy carries Harpoon Block II missiles on its Halifax-class frigates.

The Republic of Singapore Air Force also operates five modified Fokker 50 Maritime Patrol Aircraft (MPA) which are fitted with the sensors needed to fire the Harpoon missile. The Pakistani Navy carries the Harpoon missile on its frigates and P-3C Orions. The Turkish Navy carries Harpoons on surface warships and Type 209 submarines. The Turkish Air Force will be armed with the SLAM-ER. Turkey is planning to replace the Harpoons with Turkish made Atmaca missiles.

At least 339 Harpoon missiles were sold to the Republic of China Air Force (Taiwan) for its F-16 A/B Block 20 fleet and the Republic of China Navy, which operates four guided-missile destroyers and eight guided-missile frigates with the capability of carrying the Harpoon, including the eight former U.S. Navy Knox-class frigates and the four former USN Kidd-class destroyers which have been sold to Taiwan. The two Zwaardvis/Hai Lung submarines and 12 P-3C Orion aircraft can also use the missile. The eight Cheng Kung-class frigates, despite being based on the US Oliver Hazard Perry class, have Harpoon capabilities deleted from their combat systems, and funding to restore it has so far been denied, the Republic of China Navy (Taiwan) decided to switch to the Hsiung Feng II and Hsiung Feng III.

The Block 1 missiles were designated A/R/UGM-84A in US service and UGM-84B in the UK. Block 1B standard missiles were designated A/R/UGM-84C, Block 1C missiles were designated A/R/UGM-84D. Block 1 used a terminal attack mode that included a pop-up to approximately 5,900 feet (1,800 m) before diving on the target; Block 1B omitted the terminal pop-up; and Block 1C provided a selectable terminal attack mode.

=== Harpoon Block 1D ===
This version featured a larger fuel tank and re-attack capability, allowing it to search for a target again if the initial radar acquisition failed by searching in a clover-leaf pattern, but was not produced in large numbers because its intended mission (warfare with the Warsaw Pact countries of Eastern Europe) was considered to be unlikely following the Dissolution of the Soviet Union. The range is 150 miles (240 km). Block 1D missiles were designated A/RGM-84F.

=== SLAM-ER (Block 1H) ===
This version entered service in 1999, gives the SLAM a re-attack capability, as well as an image comparison capability similar to the Tomahawk cruise missile; that is, the weapon can compare the target scene in front of it with an image stored in its onboard computer during terminal phase target acquisition and lock on (this is known as DSMAC). Block 1G missiles A/R/UGM-84G; the original SLAM-ER missiles were designated AGM-84H (2000-2002) and later ones the AGM-84K (2002 onwards).

=== Harpoon Block 1J ===
Block 1J was a proposal for a further upgrade, A/R/UGM-84J Harpoon (or Harpoon 2000), for use against both ship and land targets, these upgrades later evolved into the Block II.

=== Harpoon Block II ===
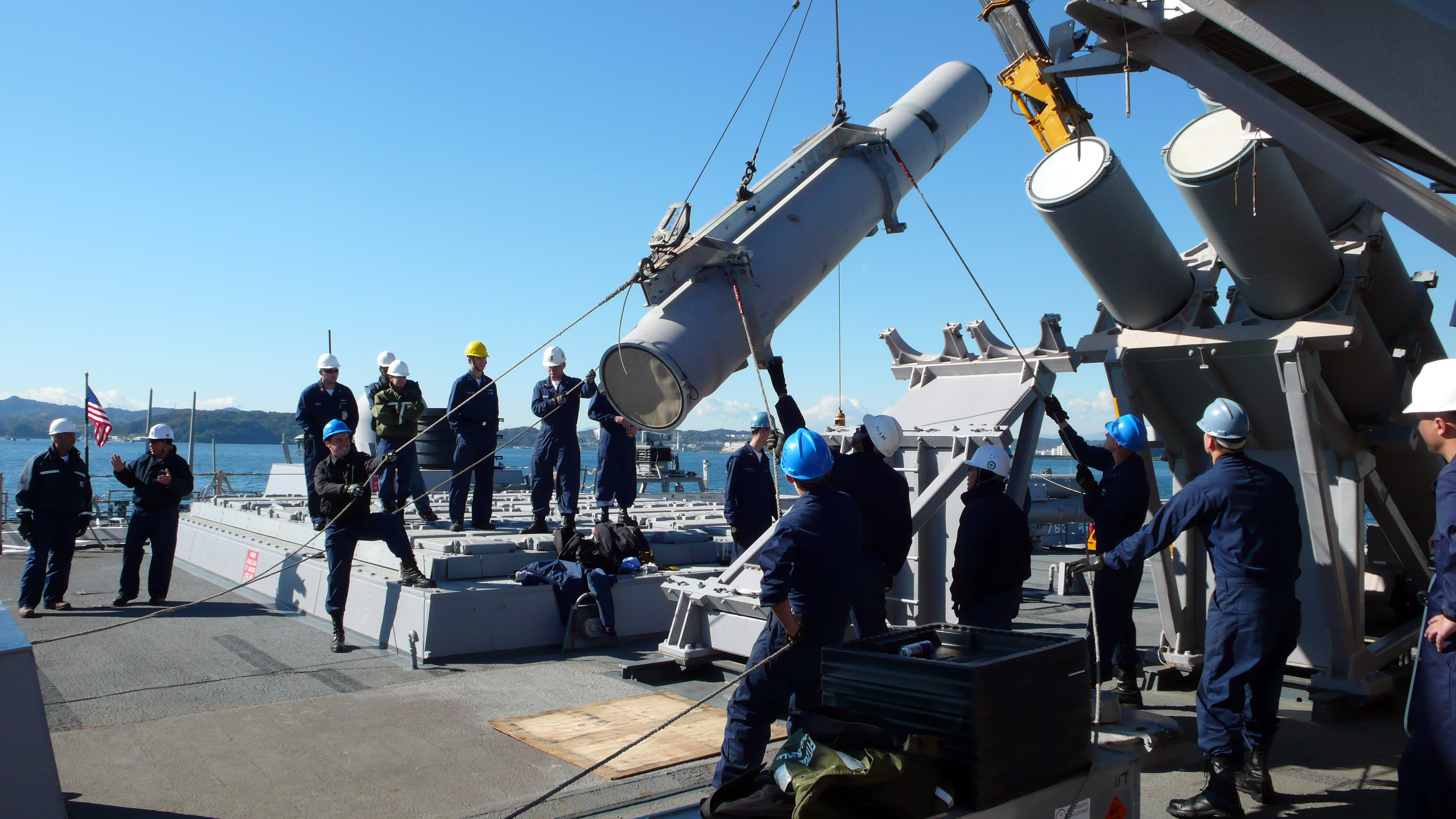
Loading Mk 141 canister launcher

In production at Boeing facilities in Saint Charles, Missouri, is the Harpoon Block II, intended to offer an expanded engagement envelope, enhanced resistance to electronic countermeasures and improved targeting. Specifically, the Harpoon was initially designed as an open-ocean weapon. The Block II missiles continue progress begun with Block IE, and the Block II missile provides the Harpoon with a littoral-water anti-ship capability.

The key improvements of the Harpoon Block II are obtained by incorporating the inertial measurement unit from the Joint Direct Attack Munition program, and the software, computer, Global Positioning System (GPS)/inertial navigation system and GPS antenna/receiver from the SLAM Expanded Response (SLAM-ER), an upgrade to the SLAM.

The US Navy awarded a $120 million contract to Boeing in July 2011 for the production of about 60 Block II Harpoon missiles, including missiles for 6 foreign militaries.

India acquired 24 Harpoon Block II missiles to arm its maritime strike Jaguar fighters in a deal worth $170 million through the Foreign Military Sales system.

In December 2010, the Defense Security Cooperation Agency (DSCA) notified U.S. Congress of a possible sale of 21 additional AGM-84L Harpoon Block II Missiles and associated equipment, parts and logistical support for a complete package worth approximately $200 million for the Indian Navy's P-8I Neptune fleet.

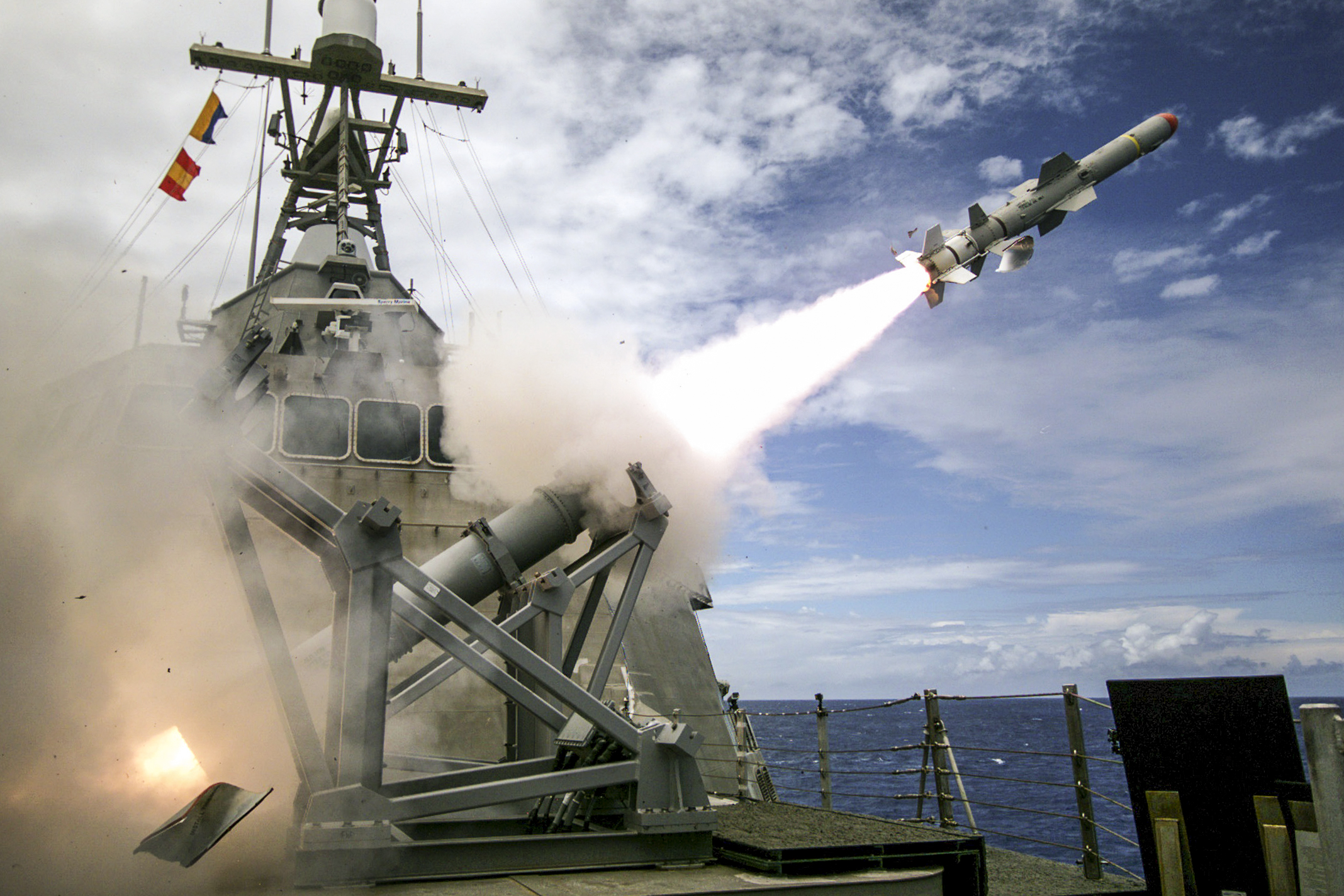
USS Coronado launches the first over-the-horizon missile engagement using a Harpoon Block 1C missile during the Rim of the Pacific Exercise (RIMPAC) 2016 in the Pacific Ocean, 21 July 2016

The Indian Navy is also planning to upgrade the fleet of four submarines – Shishumar class – with tube-launched Harpoon missiles. On 1 July 2014 DSCA approved the sale of 12 UGM-84L Harpoon Block II Encapsulated Missiles, 10 UTM-84L Harpoon Encapsulated Training missiles, 2 Encapsulated Harpoon certification training vehicles, containers, spare and repair parts for Shishumar-class submarines. On 24 September 2016, the US Department of Defense contracted Boeing a deal worth $81,271,024 for the missiles. The deal would be executed by 2018.

In April 2020, DSCA approved the sale of 10 AGM-84L Harpoon missiles along with containers, spare and repair parts, support and test equipment for the P-8I fleet to the Indian Navy at a value of $93 million. The sale of Mark 54 lightweight torpedo was approved simultaneously.

It was reported in April 2023 that the Indian Navy would be purchasing equipment for Harpoon missiles worth $80 million. It includes the sale of the Harpoon Joint Common Test Set (JCTS) and related equipment.

Harpoon Block II missiles are designated A/R/UGM-84L.

In early 2018, the U.S. State Department approved the sale of Harpoon Block II to the Mexican Navy for use on their future Sigma-class design frigates, the first of which is being built by Damen Schelde Naval Shipbuilding.

=== Harpoon Block II+ ===
On 18 November 2015, the U.S. Navy tested the AGM-84N Harpoon Block II+ missile against a moving ship target. The Block II+ incorporates an improved GPS guidance kit and a net-enabled data-link that allows the missile to receive in-flight targeting updates. Introduction of the Block II+ was achieved in 2017 on the F/A-18E/F followed by the P-8A in 2019.

=== Harpoon Block III ===
Harpoon Block III was intended to be an upgrade package to the existing USN Block 1C missiles and Command Launch Systems (CLS) for guided missile cruisers, guided missile destroyers, and the F/A-18E/F Super Hornet fighter aircraft. After experiencing an increase in the scope of required government ship integration, test and evaluation, and a delay in development of a data-link, the Harpoon Block III program was canceled by the U.S. Navy in April 2009.

=== Harpoon Block II+ ER ===
In April 2015, Boeing unveiled a modified version of the RGM-84 it called the Harpoon Next Generation. It increases the ship-launched Harpoon missile's range from the Block II's 70 nmi (81 mi; 130 km) to 167.5 nmi (192.8 mi; 310.2 km), along with a new lighter 300 lb (140 kg) warhead and a more fuel-efficient engine with electronic fuel controls. Boeing offered the missile as the U.S. Navy's Littoral Combat Ship frigate upgrade over-the-horizon anti-ship missile as a cost-effective missile upgrade option; complete Next Gen Harpoons would cost approximately as much as a Block II at $1.2 million each, with upgrades for an existing missile costing half that. The version is also called the Harpoon Block II+ ER. Boeing claims the Block II+ ER is superior to the Naval Strike Missile through its improved turbojet giving it greater range and active radar-homing seeker for all-weather operation, as well as a lighter but "more lethal" warhead. Test shots in 2017 had been confirmed. In May 2017, Boeing revealed it was no longer offering the upgraded Harpoon for the frigate OTH missile requirement, but would continue development of it.

== Operational history ==
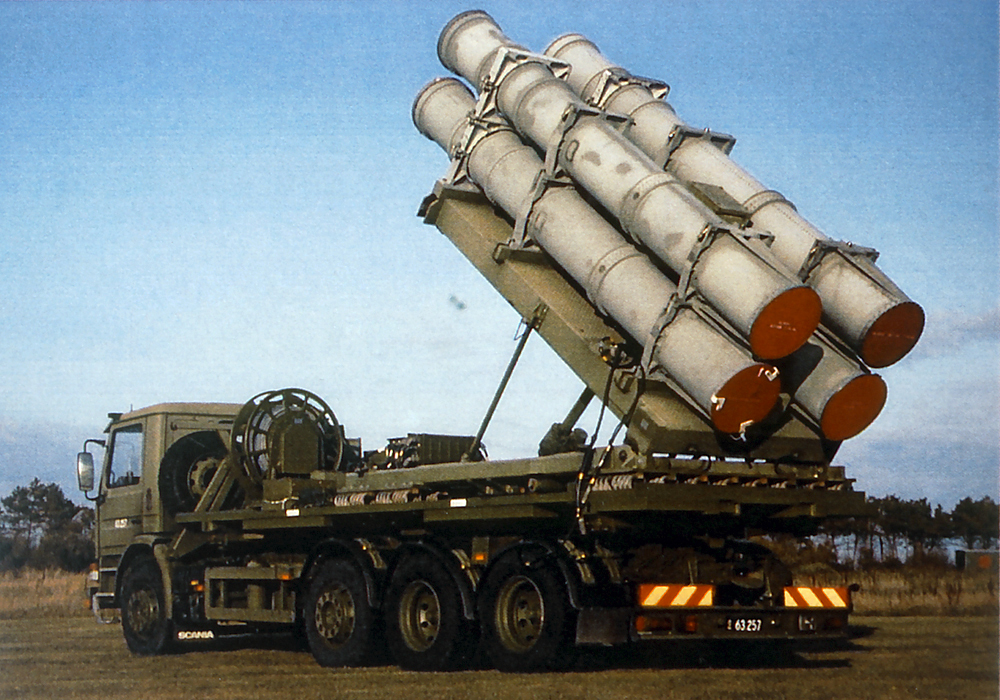
Block I coastal missile defense system truck, in service in the Danish Navy 1988–2003

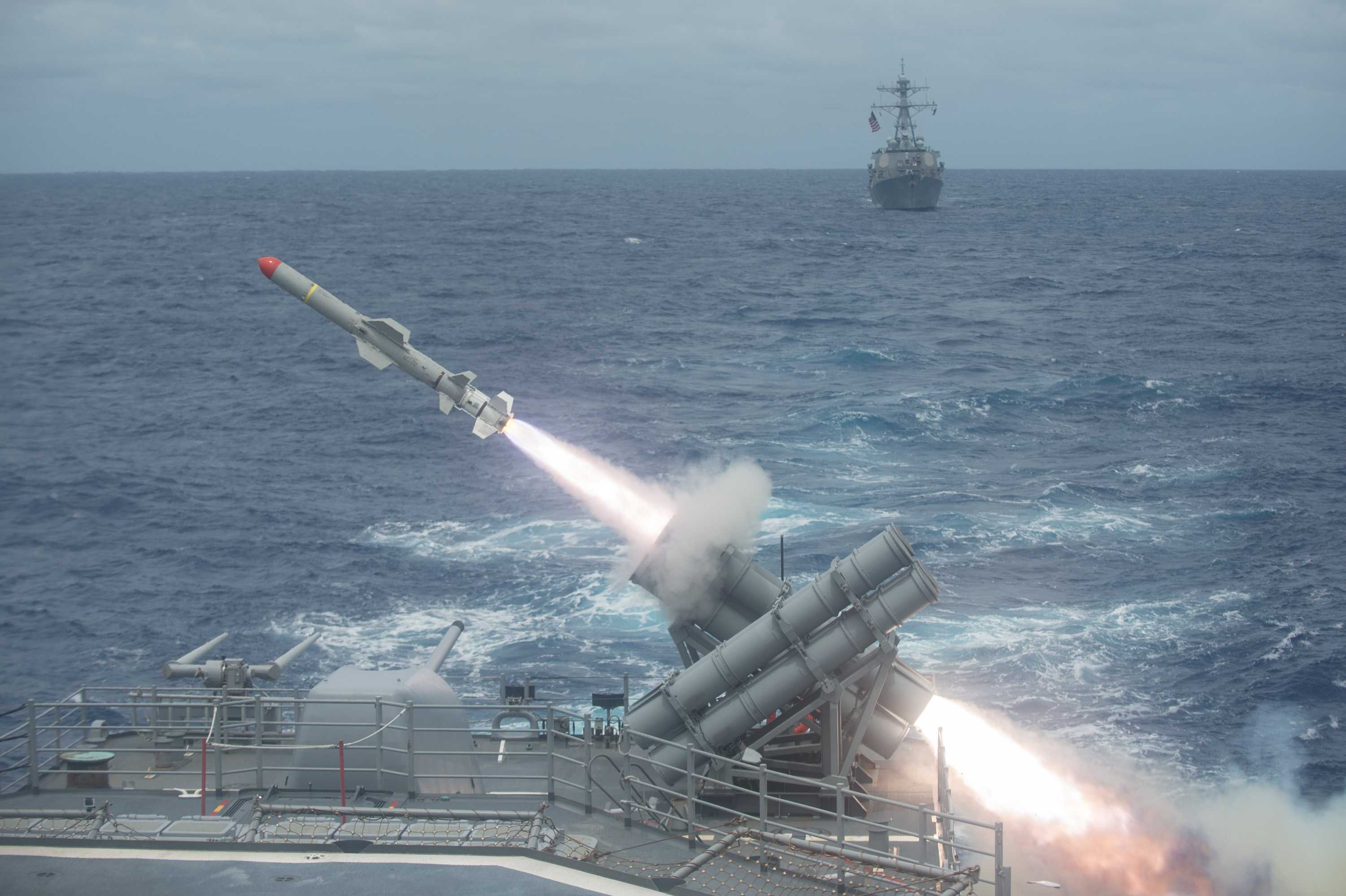
A Harpoon missile is launched from the Ticonderoga-class cruiser USS Shiloh during a live-fire exercise in 2014

In 1981 and 1982, there were two accidental launches of Harpoon missiles: one by the United States Navy which caused no damage and the other by the Danish Navy, which destroyed and damaged buildings in the recreational housing area Lumsås. The Danish missile was later known as the hovsa-missile (hovsa being the Danish term for oops).

In November 1980, during Operation Morvarid, Iranian missile boats attacked and sank two Iraqi Osa-class missile boats; one of the weapons used was the Harpoon missile.

In 1986, the United States Navy sank at least two Libyan patrol boats in the Gulf of Sidra. Two Harpoon missiles were launched from the cruiser USS Yorktown with no confirmed results and several others from A-6 Intruder aircraft that were said to have hit their targets. Initial reports claimed that USS Yorktown scored hits on a patrol boat, but action reports indicated that the target may have been a false one and that no ships were hit by those missiles.

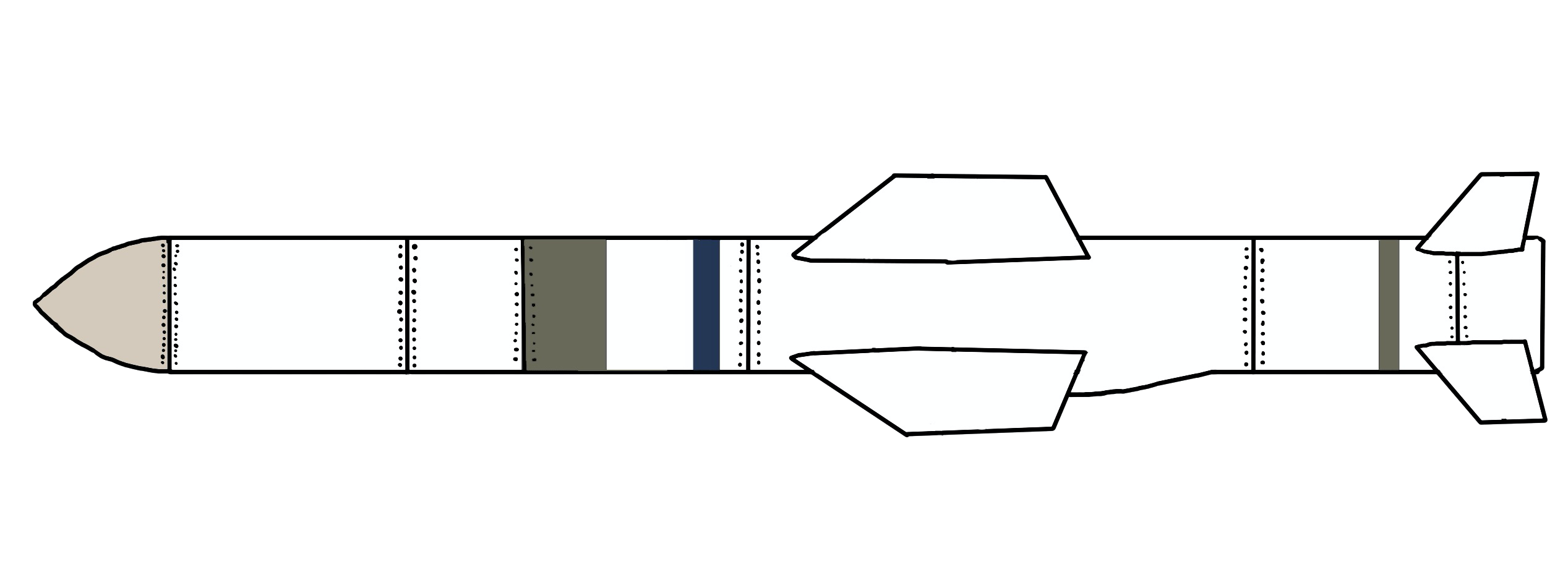
AGM-84A Harpoon from 1979 when it entered service with the US Navy

In 1988, Harpoon missiles were used by the U.S. to sink the Iranian frigate Sahand during Operation Praying Mantis. Another was fired at the Iranian Kaman-class missile boat Joshan, but failed to strike because the fast attack craft had already been mostly sunk by RIM-66 Standard missiles. An Iranian-owned Harpoon missile was also fired at the guided missile cruiser USS Wainwright. The missile was successfully lured away by chaff.

In December 1988, a Harpoon launched by an F/A-18 Hornet fighter from the aircraft carrier USS Constellation killed one sailor when it struck the merchant ship Jagvivek, a 250 ft (76 m) long Indian-owned ship, during an exercise at the Pacific Missile Range near Kauai, Hawaii. A Notice to Mariners had been issued warning of the danger, but Jagvivek left port before receiving the communication and subsequently strayed into the test range area, and the Harpoon missile, loaded just with an inert dummy warhead, locked onto it instead of its intended target.

The UGM-84A undersea-launched Harpoon version was retired from U.S. Navy service in 1997, leaving the U.S. submarine force without an anti-ship missile, a capability that is not planned to be reintroduced until the Block IV Tomahawk is modified with a moving target maritime attack feature in 2021. During RIMPAC 2018 a UGM-84 Harpoon was fired by USS Olympia at the ex-USS Racine. The U.S. Navy plans to refurbish and recertify UGM-84 Harpoon missiles to reintroduce the capability to Los Angeles-class submarines. A $10 million contract was awarded to Boeing in January 2021 to deliver the missiles by the end of the year.

In June 2009, it was reported by an American newspaper, citing unnamed officials from the Obama administration and the U.S. Congress, that the U.S. government had accused Pakistan of illegally modifying some older Harpoon missiles to strike land targets. Pakistani officials denied this and they claimed that the US was referring to a new Pakistani-designed missile. Some international experts were also reported to be skeptical of the accusations. Robert Hewson, editor of Jane's Air Launched Weapons, pointed out that the Harpoon is not suitable for the land-attack role due to deficiency in range. He also stated that Pakistan was already armed with more sophisticated missiles of Pakistani or Chinese design and, therefore, "beyond the need to reverse-engineer old US kit." Hewson offered that the missile tested by Pakistan was part of an undertaking to develop conventionally armed missiles, capable of being air- or surface-launched, to counter its rival India's missile arsenal. It was later stated that Pakistan and the US administration had reached some sort of agreement allowing US officials to inspect Pakistan's inventory of Harpoon missiles, and the issue had been resolved.

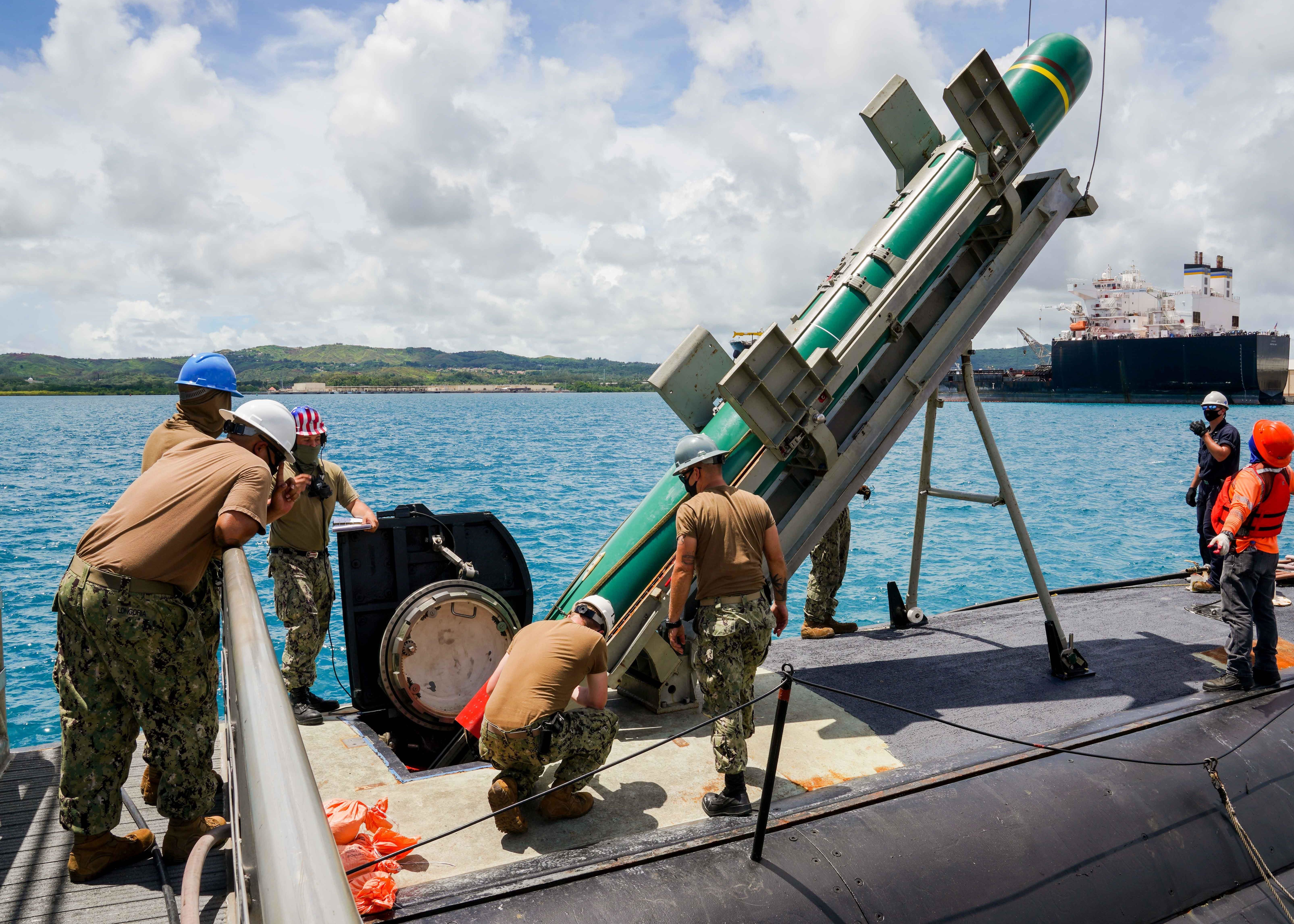
A Harpoon training missile is loaded onto the USS Asheville during a certification exercise in 2020

The Harpoon missile has also emerged as a preferred choice for several foreign countries under the Foreign Military Sales (FMS) route. In 2020 its manufacturer Boeing won two major contracts for supplying Harpoon missiles to Saudi Arabia and six other partner nations under a $3.1 billion deal.

India will also receive Harpoon missiles under FMS in a $155 million deal.

In late May 2022, Denmark sent Harpoon launchers and missiles to Ukraine to help their war effort, and shortly after, the Netherlands sent additional missiles. In mid-June 2022, the U.S. announced that they would supply Ukraine with Harpoon launchers and missiles, and the U.K. Defense Ministry said that they also were looking into supplying Ukraine with the missiles. On 17 June, Ukraine claimed its navy had sunk the tugboat Spasatel Vasily Bekh with two Harpoon missiles. In a tweet they said "Spasatel Vasily Bekh, a tug of the Russian Black Sea Fleet, successfully demilitarized by the @UA_NAVY. The ship was transporting personnel, weapons and ammunition to the occupied Snake Island." Ukraine's Naval Command also claimed the Russian tugboat had a Tor missile system on board.

In May 2025 the United States Special Operations Command (SOCOM) announced that the Air Force Special Operations Command (AFSOC) has been conducting field tests to deploy the Harpoon from the AC-130J Ghostrider gunship since 2024. Due to increasing tensions with Russia, China, North Korea and Iran, fielding the Harpoon would give the AC-130 an all-new dedicated standoff anti-ship capability, an ability that would be advantageous in any future large-scale naval conflicts in the Pacific and Indian Ocean.

== Operators ==
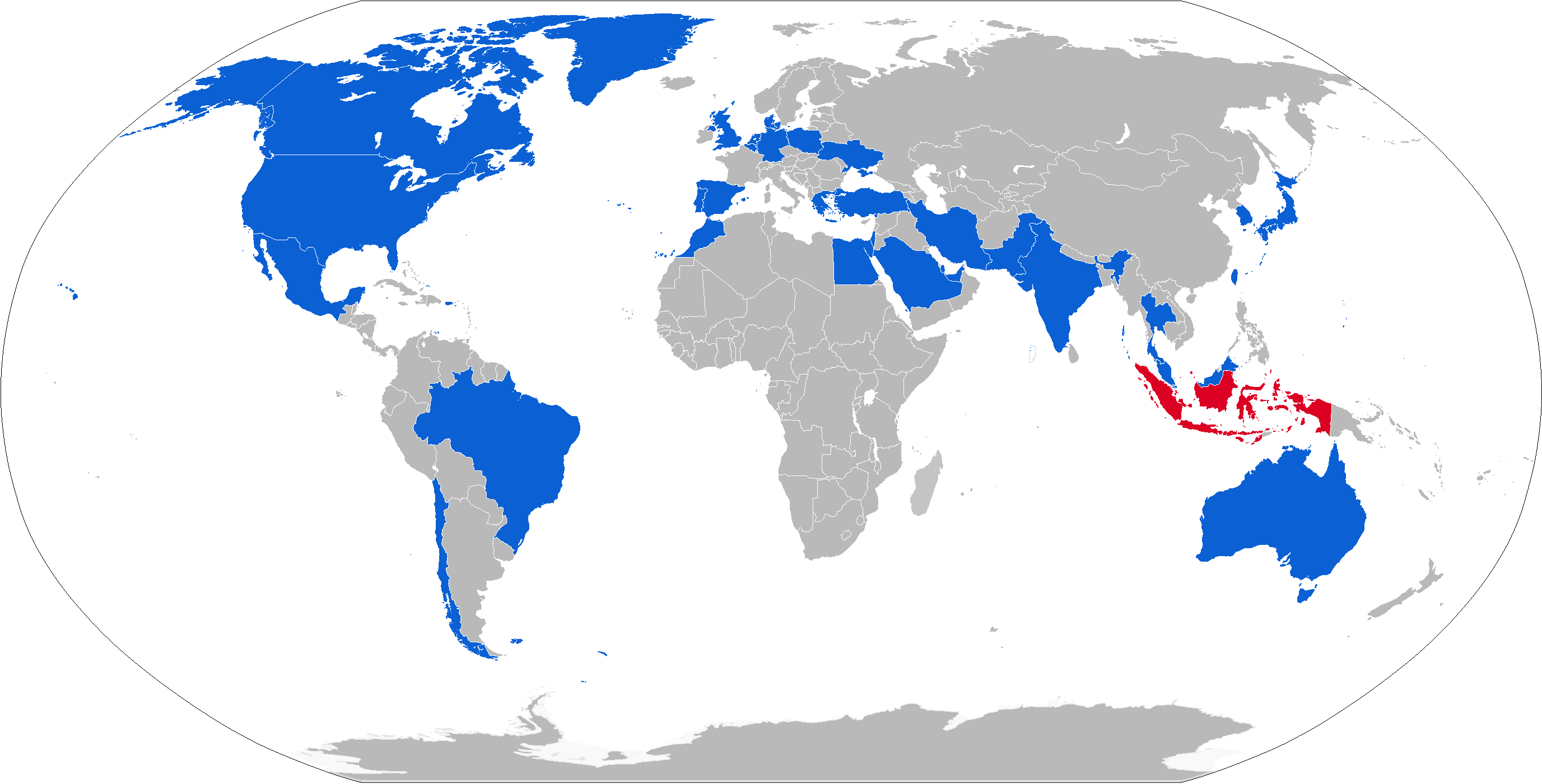
Harpoon operators Current Former (Indonesia)

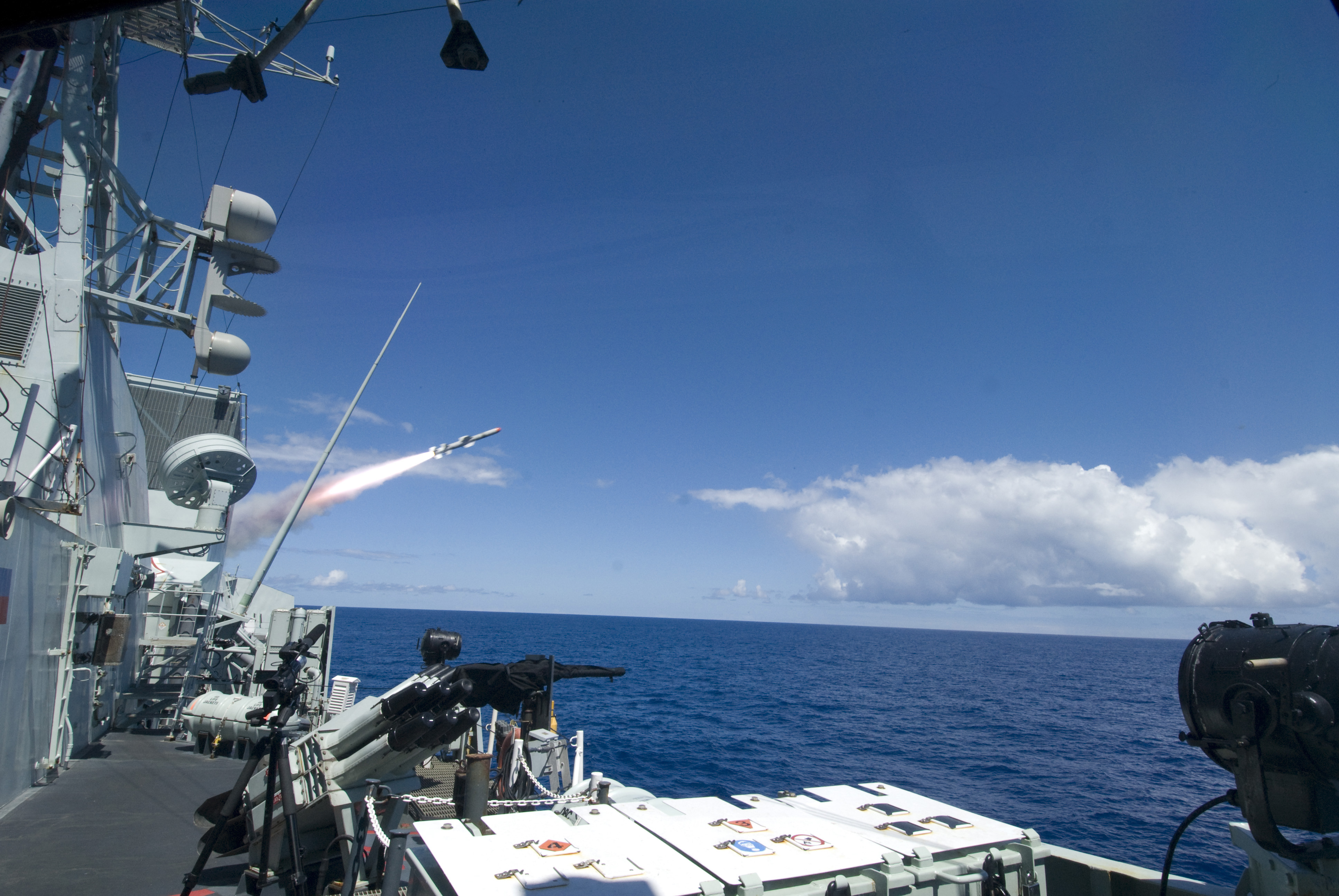
The Canadian frigate HMCS Regina fires a Harpoon anti-ship missile during a Rim of the Pacific (RIMPAC) sinking exercise

Australia

- Royal Australian Navy
- Royal Australian Air Force

Belgium

- Belgian Navy

Brazil

- Brazilian Air Force

Canada

- Royal Canadian Navy

Chile

- Chilean Navy
- Chilean Air Force

Denmark

- Royal Danish Navy

Egypt

- Egyptian Air Force
- Egyptian Navy

Germany

- German Navy

Greece

- Hellenic Air Force
- Hellenic Navy

India

- Indian Air Force
- Indian Navy

Indonesia

- Indonesian Navy (Block 1D) (retired)

Iran

- Islamic Republic of Iran Navy

Israel

- Israeli Air Force
- Israeli Navy

Japan

- Japan Maritime Self-Defense Force

Malaysia

- Royal Malaysian Air Force

Mexico

- Mexican Navy

Morocco

- Royal Moroccan Air Force

Netherlands

- Royal Netherlands Navy

Pakistan

- Pakistan Air Force
- Pakistan Navy

Poland

- Polish Navy

Portugal

- Portuguese Air Force
- Portuguese Navy

Qatar

- Qatar Emiri Air Force - Harpoon Block 2 on order for use with F-15QA

Republic of Korea

- Republic of Korea Air Force
- Republic of Korea Navy

Saudi Arabia

- Royal Saudi Air Force
- Royal Saudi Navy

Singapore

- Republic of Singapore Air Force
- Republic of Singapore Navy

Spain

- Spanish Air and Space Force
- Spanish Navy

Republic of China (Taiwan)

- Republic of China Air Force
- Republic of China Navy

Thailand

- Royal Thai Navy

Turkey

- Turkish Air Force
- Turkish Navy

United Arab Emirates

- United Arab Emirates Navy

United Kingdom

- Royal Navy (retired)
- Royal Air Force

Ukraine

- Ukrainian Navy

United States

- United States Air Force
- United States Navy
- United States Marine Corps
- United States Coast Guard (retired)

== See also ==
- AGM-158C LRASM – (United States)
- Atmaca – (Turkey)
- Exocet – (France)
- HAS-250 – (United Arab Emirates)
- Hsiung Feng II – (Taiwan)
- Hsiung Feng III – (Taiwan)
- Kh-35 – (Russia)
- MANSUP – (Brazil)
- Naval Strike Missile – (Norway)
- NASM-MR – (India)
- NASM-SR – (India)
- Neptune – (Ukraine)
- Otomat – (Italy, France)
- RBS-15 – (Sweden)
- Sea Eagle – (United Kingdom)
- Sea Breaker – (Israel)
- SSM-700K Haeseong – (South Korea)
- Type 80 air-to-ship missile – (Japan)
- Type 88 surface-to-ship missile – (Japan)
- Type 90 ship-to-ship missile – (Japan)
- Type 93 air-to-ship missile – (Japan)
- YJ-83 – (China)
