= Mitsubishi F-1 =

Japanese supersonic strike/attack aircraft

F-1
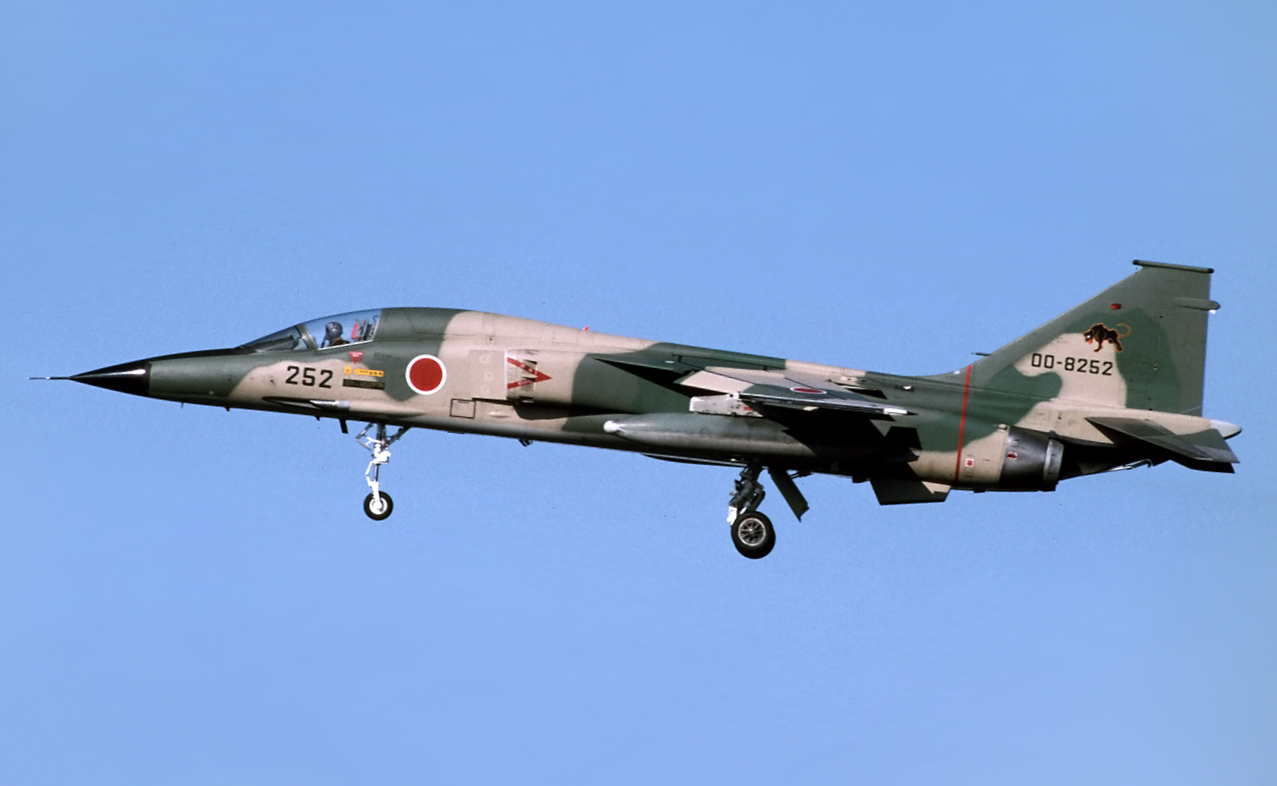
- F-1 at Misawa Base (1994)

General information
- Type: Attack aircraft
- National origin: Japan
- Manufacturer: Mitsubishi Heavy Industries
- Primary user: Japan Air Self Defense Force
- Number built: 77

History
- Manufactured: 1975–1987
- Introduction date: April 1978
- First flight: 3 June 1975
- Retired: March 2006
- Developed from: Mitsubishi T-2

The Mitsubishi F-1 is a single-seat twin-engine supersonic strike aircraft designed and produced by the Japanese conglomerate Mitsubishi Heavy Industries. It was Japan's first domestically developed supersonic combat aircraft.

Developed during the early 1970s, the F-1 is essentially a combat-orientated derivative of the Mitsubishi T-2 trainer aircraft, which was also procured for the Japan Air Self-Defense Force (JASDF); accordingly, it was initially referred to as the FS-T2kai prior to being redesignated as F-1. Key modifications included the removal of the second seat in the cockpit for an avionics bay, airframe strengthening, and the installation of additional hardpoints. While the F-1 was not a highly manoeuvrable aircraft, it was intended for advanced avionics and intense training to be decisive factors in the event of live combat. The F-1 was primarily oriented towards the ground attack and anti-shipping missions, in which it was viewed as being a suitable counter to Soviet warships. Secondarily, it was also intended to function as an air defence fighter.

The F-1 performed its maiden flight on 3 June 1975, and entered service with the JASDF just over two years later. No other operators emerged for the type; production was terminated in 1987 after 77 aircraft were completed. Despite its prospective replacement by a more capable aircraft being openly discussed by the mid-1980s, the majority of the fleet underwent a service life extension programme (SLEP) during the 1990s and remained in active service until 2006, at which point the last F-1s were withdrawn in favour of the more capable F-2.

== Design and development ==
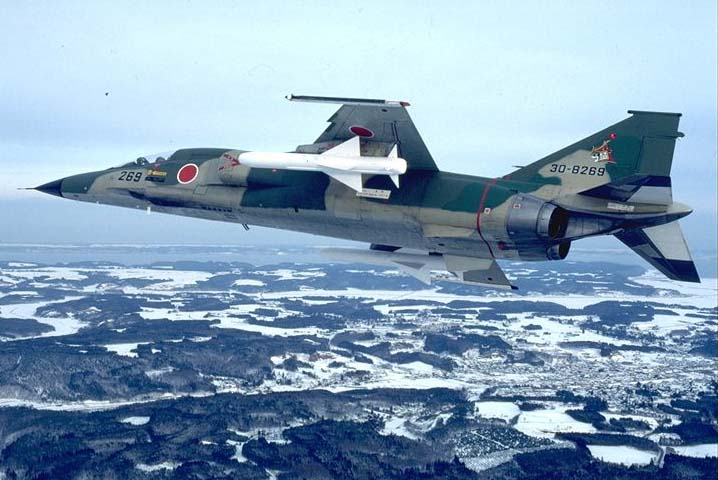
F-1 in flight. Note the anti-ship missiles being carried underwing

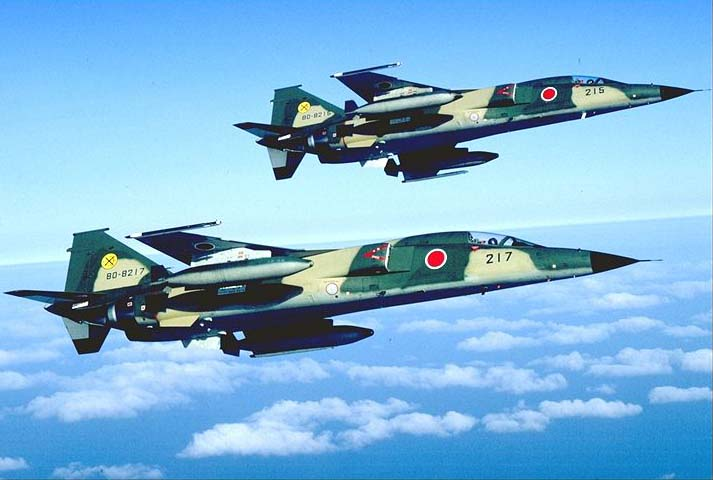
A pair of F-1s in formation flight, 2002

In the mid 1960s, the Japan Air Self-Defense Force (JASDF) commenced studies into an advanced jet trainer which could also be modified to serve in the ground attack and anti-shipping roles. After considering the license production of the several overseas aircraft, including the American Northrop T-38 Talon and the Anglo/French SEPECAT Jaguar, Japan decided to develop its own trainer, the supersonic Mitsubishi T-2, which made its maiden flight on 20 July 1971. During 1972, the JASDF announced its intention to procure the F-1 strike fighter derivative to succeed its aging North American F-86 Sabre fleet.

Cost over-runs on the T-2 program led to the proposed single seat attack version almost being abandoned, but the cancellation of the Kawasaki P-XL, the planned replacement for Japan's Kawasaki P-2J maritime patrol aircraft released funds while simultaneously raising the importance of keeping Japan's aviation industry engaged upon sufficient work, thus contracts were awarded for the development of the attack version as the FS-T2kai in 1973. A major driving force for a new combat aircraft was the desire for a capable close air support platform which could be deployed against a potential amphibious attack upon Japan by the Soviet Union, although the F-1 would not be specifically designed for this mission.

The new aircraft was a minimum change derivative of the T-2, with the rear cockpit being converted to an avionics bay by removing the rear seat, and replacing the canopy with a simple unglazed access hatch. Two additional hardpoints were fitted under the wing to allow carriage of a heavier weapon load, and the avionics were improved, which included the addition of a Ferranti-supplied inertial navigation system, Thomson-CSF-supplied head-up display, J/ASQ-1 bombing computer, and J/AWG-12 radar set (the latter being similar to the AN/AWG-12 sets fitted in British Royal Air Force F-4M Phantom fighter jets). This set provides ranging information. Aside from the avionics changes, deletion of the rear seat, and new one-piece canopy, the only other major change from the T-2 was the strengthening of the airframe to enable it to carry a larger weapons load than the T-2. The F-1 is fitted with an internally mounted 20 mm JM61A1 Vulcan cannon with 750 rounds of ammunition. The aircraft also had a total of seven external hardpoints for the carriage of a wide variety of stores (missiles, gun pods, etc.). The fuselage hardpoint and inboard pair of underwing hardpoints are plumbed for external fuel tanks to increase the aircraft's range.

The primary weapon of the F-1 is the ASM-1 (and the newer ASM-2) long-range anti-ship missile. This weapon is roughly in the class of the American AGM-84 Harpoon or French AM.39 Exocet. Other weapons carried include the all-aspect short-range heat-seeking AIM-9 Sidewinder air-to-air missile for air-to-air combat. Typically, this weapon was carried on the wingtip rails, but it could also be carried on the outboard underwing hardpoints for the F-1's secondary air defense role. Other air-to-ground weapons carried include rocket pods (JLAU-3/A) of 70 mm (2.75 in) size as well as bombs of 227 kg (500 lb) and 340 kg (750 lb) in size (Mk82 and M117 respectively). In addition, the Mk-82 and M117 bombs can be fitted with infrared guidance kits, turning them into precision-guided weapons that home in on heat radiation emitted from seaborne targets such as ships or other ground-based targets. When fitted with this kit, the bomb becomes known as GCS-1.

While the JASDAF had initially planned to procure 160 F-1s, this was reduced down to 77 aircraft, primarily as a result of budget cuts. Production of the type was terminated in 1987.

== Operational history ==
During late 1977, the F-1 entered operational service with the Japan Air Self-Defense Force (JASDF). Deliveries of the type continued until March 1987. A total of 77 F-1s would see operational use.

Operationally, substantial focus was placed upon the F-1's role as a maritime defence platform and the prospective use of its sizable anti-ship missiles to strike enemy warships. Additionally, the F-1 held a secondary role to patrol Japanese airspace, despite its survivability in air-to-air combat being a persistent cause for concern due to the aircraft not being particularly manoeuvrable or aerodynamically advanced. As an aerial interceptor, the F-1 was heavily reliant upon the capabilities of its avionics, such as its search and detection radar, being superior to that of its potential opponents; it was also believed that superior discipline, intensive training, and more advanced air-to-air missiles would be decisive factors in such an engagement.

During the 1990s, 70 F-1s were recipients of a service life extension programme (SLEP), which increased the operational life of their airframes from 3,500 hours to 4,000 hours.

By the mid-1980s, Japanese defence planners were already considering the F-1's prospective replacement by a more capable successor aircraft. The F-1 was ultimately replaced by the F-2 (Japan/U.S. developed, based on the F-16C/D Agile Falcon), as well as upgraded F-4EJ Kai Phantom IIs. The last six active F-1s, based at Tsuiki in Fukuoka Prefecture, were retired on 9 March 2006, having reached the 4,000 hour limit of their airframes.

== Variants ==
FS-T2-Kai

Prototypes, two built.

Mitsubishi F-1

Single-seat close air support, ground-attack and anti-ship fighter aircraft. 77 built.

== Operators ==
Japan

- Japan Air Self-Defense Force

== Survivors / Aircraft on display ==
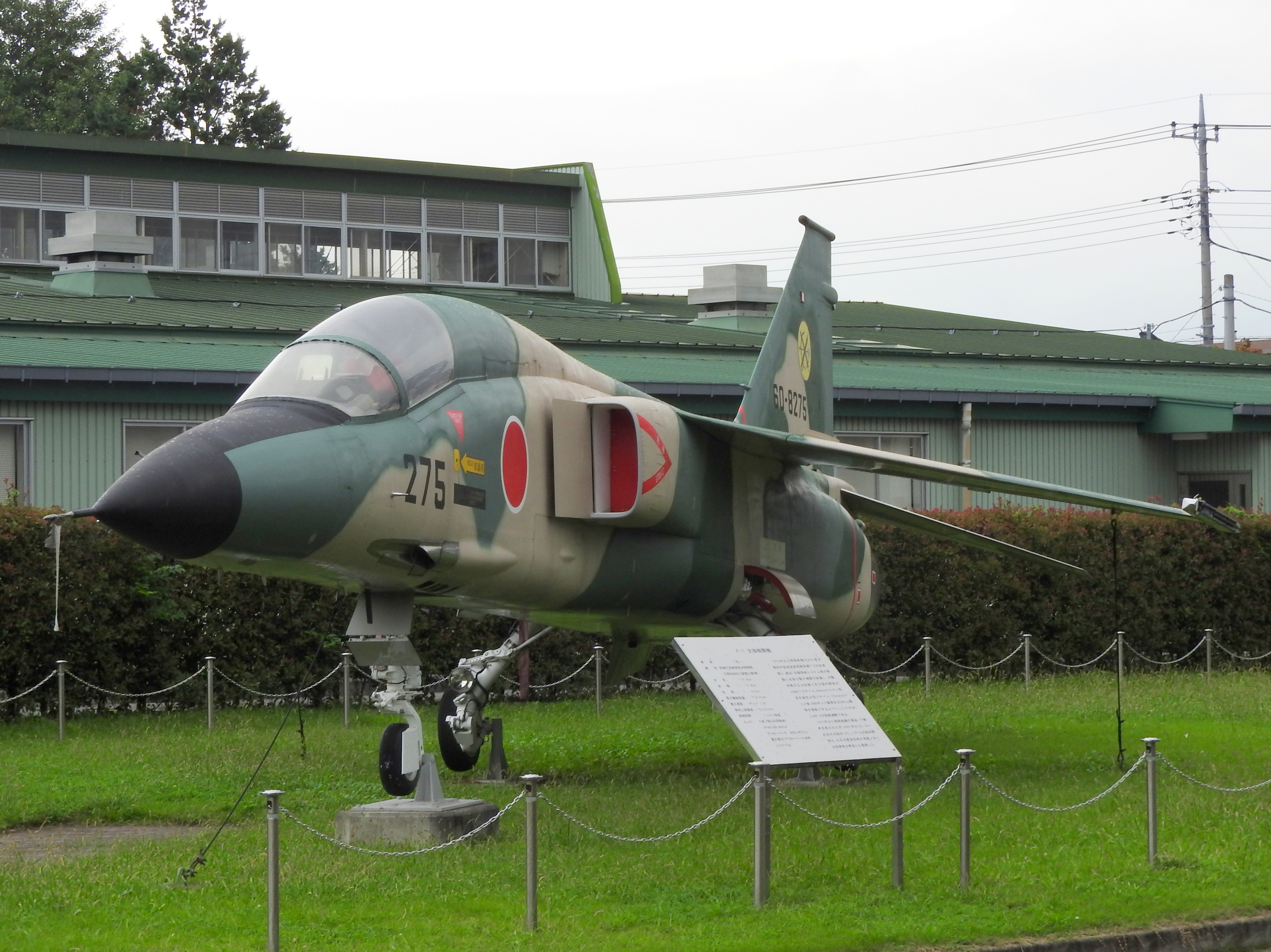
F-1 on display at Fuchū Air Base, Tokyo

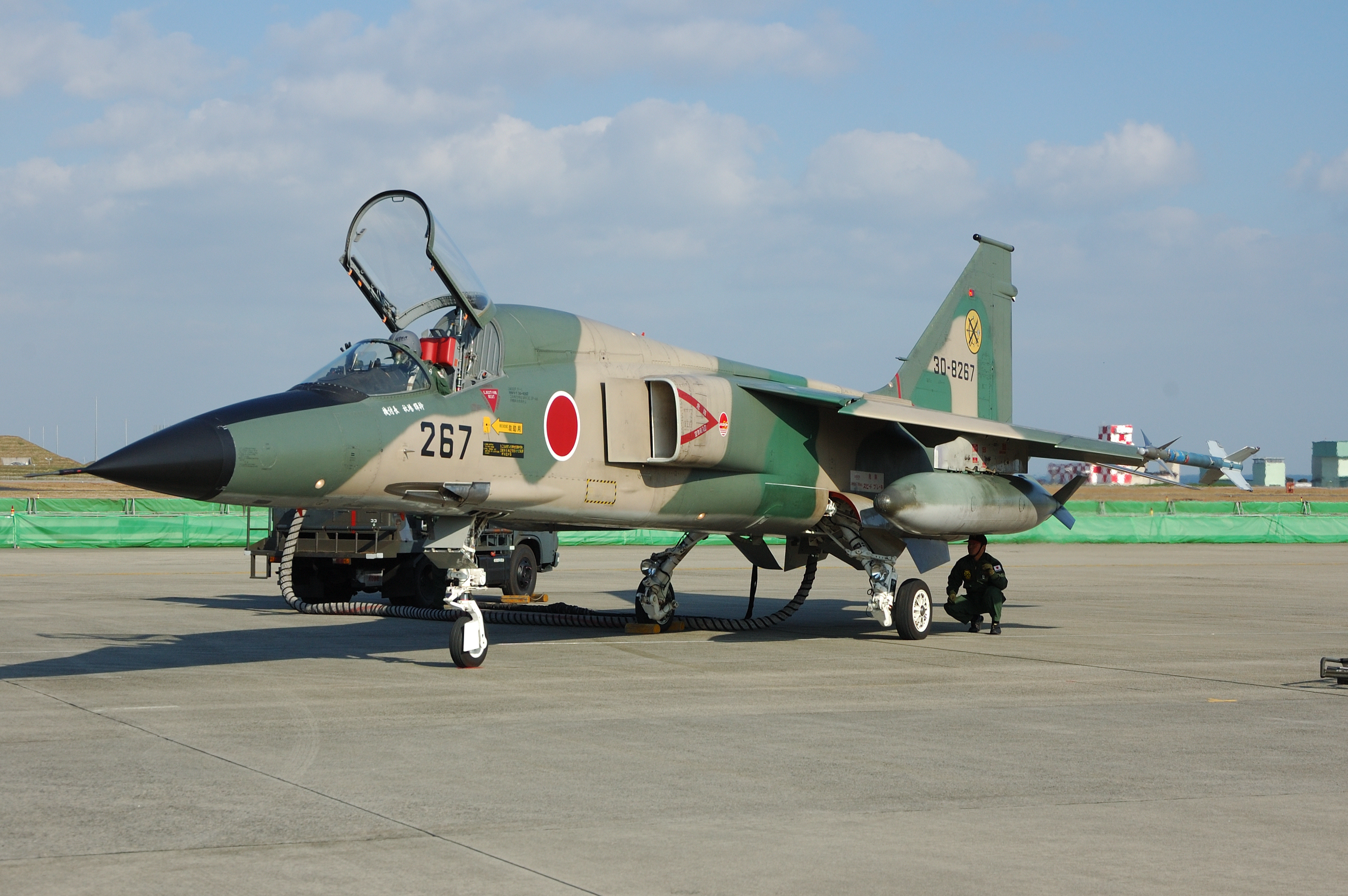
F-1 at Tsuiki Air Field, Fukuoka Prefecture, Japan

- 60-8275 F-1 Fuchū Air Base, in Fuchu, Tokyo
- 70-8207 F-1 Mitsu Seiki Co., Ltd. Taga Works, Awaji, Hyōgo
- 00-8249 F-1 JASDF Kamo sub-base, Oga, Akita Prefecture
- 00-8241 F-1 (nose section) Misawa Air Base, Misawa, Aomori Prefecture
- 00-8247 F-1 Misawa Aviation & Science Museum, Misawa, Aomori Prefecture
- 80-8219 F-1 (fire training) Ashiya Air Field, Ashiya, Fukuoka Prefecture
- 90-8234 F-1 Kasuga Air Base, Kasuga, Fukuoka Prefecture
- 70-8277 F-1 Tsuiki Air Field, Tsuiki, Fukuoka Prefecture
- 00-8242 F-1 JASDF Erimo sub-base, Erimo, Hokkaido Prefecture
- 60-8274 F-1 Hyakuri Airport, Omitama, Ibaraki Prefecture
- 20-8263 F-1 National Defense Academy of Japan, Yokosuka, Kanagawa Prefecture
- 00-8246 F-1 JASDF Sado sub-base, Sado, Niigata Prefecture
- 70-8201 F-1 Iruma Air Base, Sayama, Saitama Prefecture
- 90-8232 F-1 Ōtsu JGSDF base, Ōtsu, Shiga Prefecture
- 90-8231 F-1 (Nose section) Fujisan Juku no Mori Park, Airfield cafe, Gotemba, Shizuoka Prefecture
- 90-8227 F-1, Hamamatsu Public Relations Center, Hamamatsu, Shizuoka Prefecture
- 90-8225 F-1, Hamamatsu Public Relations Center, Hamamatsu, Shizuoka Prefecture
- 30-8268 F-1 U.S.-Japan Joint Air Defense Command HQ, Yokota Air Base, Fussa, Tokyo
- 10-8256 F-1 Hōfu Kita Air Base, Hōfu, Yamaguchi Prefecture
- 50-8270 F-1 Hōfu South Air Base, Hōfu, Yamaguchi Prefecture
- 10-8257 F-1 Fukue Branch Base, Fukue, Nagasaki Prefecture
- 20-8260 F-1 Miho Air Base, Sakaiminato, Tottori Prefecture
- 70-8276 F-1 Nara Base, Nara, Nara, Nara Prefecture

== Specifications (F-1) ==
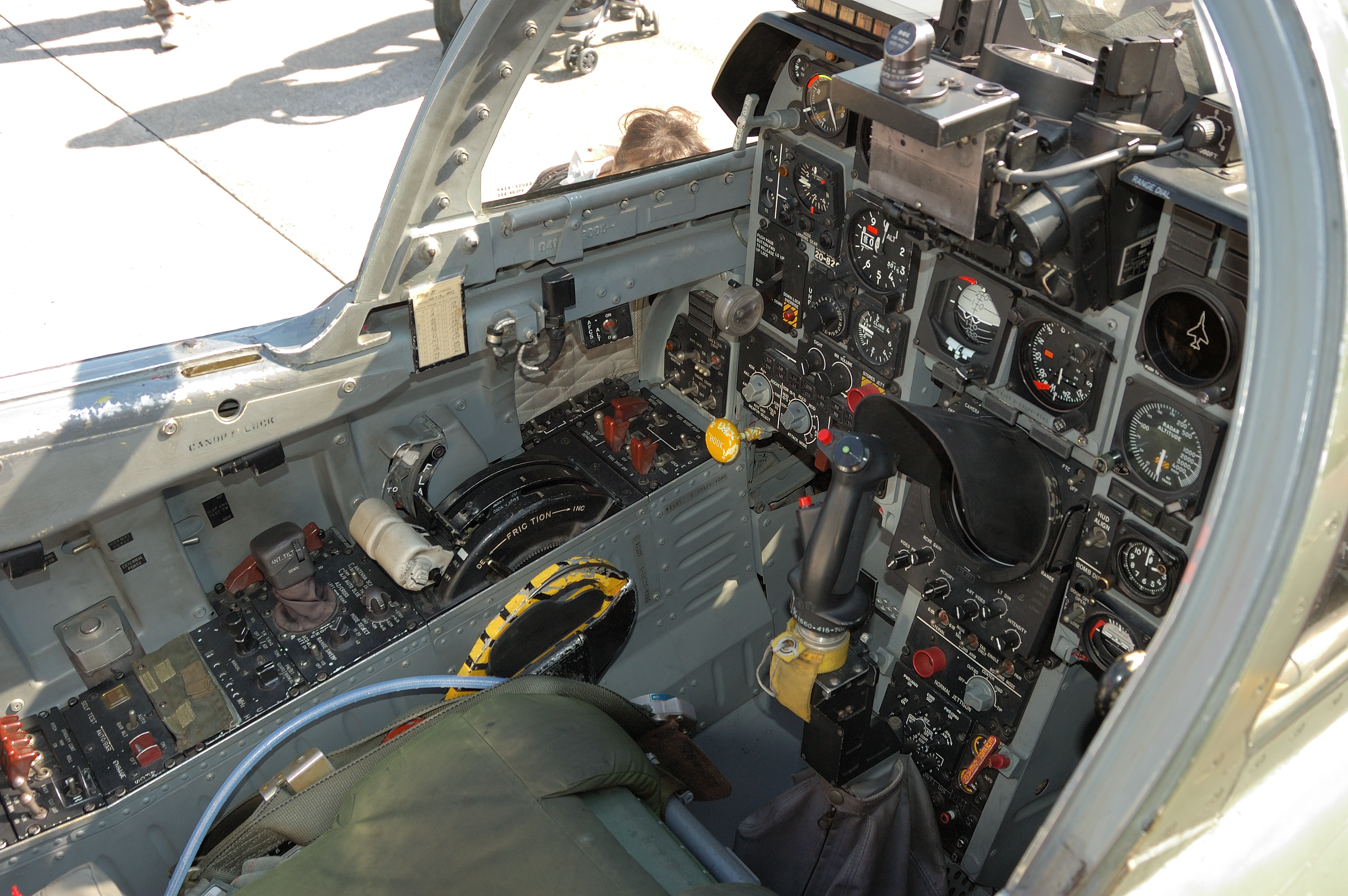
Cockpit of an F-1

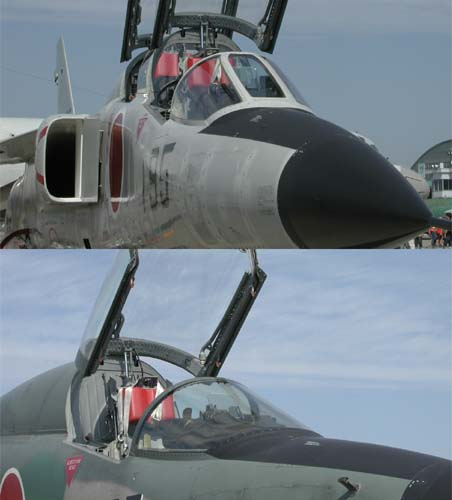
Canopies of a T-2 (above) and F-1 (below)

Data from Mitsubishi's Sabre Successor

General characteristics

- Crew: 1
- Length: 17.86 m (58 ft 7 in)
- Wingspan: 7.88 m (25 ft 10 in)
- Height: 4.48 m (14 ft 8 in)
- Wing area: 21.2 m^{2} (228 sq ft)
- Empty weight: 6,358 kg (14,017 lb)
- Max takeoff weight: 13,674 kg (30,146 lb)
- Powerplant: 2 × Ishikawa-Harima TF40-801A afterburning turbofan engines, 22.8 kN (5,100 lbf) thrust each dry, 35.6 kN (8,000 lbf) with afterburner

Performance

- Maximum speed: 1,700 km/h (1,100 mph, 920 kn) at 11,000 m (36,000 ft) (clean)
- Combat range: 556 km (345 mi, 300 nmi) High-Low-High profile with two ASM-1 missiles and one 830 L (220 US gal; 180 imp gal) drop tank
- Ferry range: 2,870 km (1,780 mi, 1,550 nmi) (max external fuel)
- Service ceiling: 15,240 m (50,000 ft)
- Time to altitude: 11,000 m (36,000 ft) in two minutes
- Wing loading: 645 kg/m^{2} (132 lb/sq ft)

Armament

- Guns: 1× 20 mm (0.787 in) JM61A1 Vulcan 6-barreled Gatling cannon
- Hardpoints: One centerline, four underwing and two wingtip missile rails with a capacity of 6,000 lb (2,700 kg) of ordnance
- Bombs: Various bombs, air-to-air and air-to-surface missiles and rocket pods on four underwing, two wingtip, and one underfuselage pylon. Weapons carried include AIM-9 Sidewinder, Mitsubishi AAM-1, Mitsubishi Type 80 air-to-ship missile/Type 93 air-to-ship missile anti-ship missiles, JLAU-3A 70 mm rocket pods, RL-7 70 mm rockets, RL-4 125 mm rockets, Mk-82 500 lb and M117 750 lb bombs, the GCS-1, and IR-guided versions of the Mk-82 and M117.

== See also ==
Related development

- Mitsubishi T-2

Aircraft of comparable role, configuration, and era

- Republic F-105 Thunderchief
- IAR-93
- SEPECAT Jaguar
- Soko J-22 Orao
- Xian JH-7
