= Type 91 =

Type 91 may refer to:

== Japanese war equipment ==
- Hiro Navy Type 91 flying boat, or Hiro H4H, a 1930s Japanese bomber or reconnaissance monoplane flying boat
- Nakajima Army Type 91 fighter, a Japanese fighter of the 1930s
- Type 91 air-to-ship missile, a Japanese air-to-ship missile
- Hiro Type 91 (engine), a 12-cylinder aircraft engine used by the Imperial Japanese Navy in the mid-1930s
- Type 91 grenade, an improved version of the Type 10 hand grenade of the Imperial Japanese Army
- Type 91 10 cm howitzer, used by the Imperial Japanese Army during the Second Sino-Japanese War and World War II
- Type 91 surface-to-air missile, a Japanese man-portable surface-to-air missile system
- Type 91 torpedo, an aerial torpedo of the Imperial Japanese Navy

== Other ==
- T91 assault rifle, a Taiwanese assault rifle
- Type 91 grenade launcher, a Chinese grenade launcher used to launch 35mm non-lethal grenades
- Bristol Type 91 Brownie, a British light sports aircraft
