= Bullseye (missile) =

- Type: Cruise missile

Production history
- Designer: Rafael Advanced Defense Systems
- Manufacturer: General Atomics / Rafael Advanced Defense Systems
- Developed from: Rafael Ice Breaker

Specifications
- Mass: <1,000 lb (450 kg) in 'Maritime Strike' configuration
- Length: <4 meters (13.1 ft)
- Wingspan: >2 meters (6.6 ft)
- Maximum firing range: >300 km (190 mi)
- Warhead: General purpose high-explosive or penetrating warhead
- Warhead weight: 250lb or 500lb
- Engine: Small Jet engine
- Guidance system: GPS+TERCOM; Electro Optical IIR (Terminal)
- Launch platform: Fighter aircraft M270 MLRS; Mk-41 VLS

The Bullseye is an air-launched, low-observable cruise missile produced by General Atomics Electromagnetic Services (GA-EMS) based on the Ice Breaker developed by Rafael Advanced Defense Systems.

== Development history ==
Early renderings of the missile were first publicly seen at the Surface Navy Association annual symposium in January 2025, at which a placeholder render was displayed under the generic name "Strike Missile". The render showed a slab-sided design with an air-breathing propulsion system and a single ventral intake.

On April 7 at the Sea-Air-Space 2025 conference, General Atomics announced that it had signed a memorandum of understanding (MOU) to produce a variant of the Rafael Ice Breaker missile in the United States which would be named Bullseye. According to General Atomics, discussions with Rafael began several years prior but concentrated efforts did not begin until July 2024. A full-sized mockup of the weapon was displayed at the event, which departed from the placeholder design shown in the January renders for a version that appeared identical to the Ice Breaker. Under the MOU, General Atomics will be the prime contractor to manufacture the missile in the U.S., at its site in Tupelo, Mississippi. At least half of the missile will be built in the United States.

The missile was unveiled to U.S. Secretary of Defense Pete Hegseth the week prior to the Sea-Air-Space 2025 event.

== Capabilities ==
Bullseye is a variant of Rafael's Ice Breaker missile, which was first revealed in 2022. Ice Breaker is an air-launched, low-observable missile with a 300 km (260.7 n mile) range; it has been flight qualified and tested but not yet operationally employed, with operational deliveries expected in late 2025 or early 2026. General Atomics characterizes Bullseye as a Very Low Observable (VLO) long range, precision-guided missile with multi-platform launch capabilities from ground, sea and air platforms and built-in autonomous capability to identify and engage hostile targets with a variety of warhead payloads and propulsion requirements. It has a modular design that is capable of anti-ship, anti-surface, electronic warfare, decoy operations, as well as undefined "other" missions; however it will initially be sold for maritime strike. It can be canister-launched from a Mk 41 Vertical Launch System or fired from an M270 MLRS.

The missile is optimized for deep strike scenarios in all-weather conditions, and designed to operate in anti-access/area denial environments. Intended launch platforms include fixed wing fighters and light attack aircraft, helicopters, small maritime vessels, and ground vehicles. Similar to other Rafael-designed missiles such as the Spike-LR, the missile features man-in-the-loop decision capability as a backup, but is otherwise fully autonomous. According to General Atomics, it supports advanced mission planning features including synchronized attack capability, and can engage targets independently through automatic target recognition. According to Yuval Miller, head of Rafael's Air & C4ISR Systems Division, it is a "fifth-generation missile" due to its ability to operate in GPS-denied environments for the entire duration of flight and its resiliency against threats. It can perform sea-skimming flight profiles in anti-ship strike missions, and has terrain-avoidance capability for nap-of-the-earth flight on land.

The missile's length is under four meters (13.1 feet) with a wingspan of over two meters (6.6 feet) when deployed, which is similar to the Ice Breaker. The chassis features fold-out wings and cruciform-shaped tail fins, with a single ventral turbojet air intake. Gross weight will vary based on the payload, but typically will weigh under 1,000 pounds with a strike radius in excess of 300 kilometers (186 miles). The range is expected to compete with the similarly-sized Joint Strike Missile, but at a lower cost. The propulsion system is an undetermined mark of small jet engine. The missile comes in two warhead size-classes of 250lb and 500lb, each with a general purpose high-explosive variant and a penetrating variant. The seeker technology is directly leveraged from the Ice Breaker's electro-optical imaging infrared sensor through a trapezoidal nose cone, which features scene-matching and automatic target recognition capabilities. According to The Aviationist, the two arrays located on top of the nose cone are speculated to be either related to a satellite link or counter-jamming equipment. Navigation is provided through an inertial navigation system (INS) with jam-resistant GPS and terrain contour matching (TERCOM).

== See also ==
- AGM-158C LRASM, a similar low-observable anti-ship missile
