= NASM-SR =

Indian anti-ship missile system

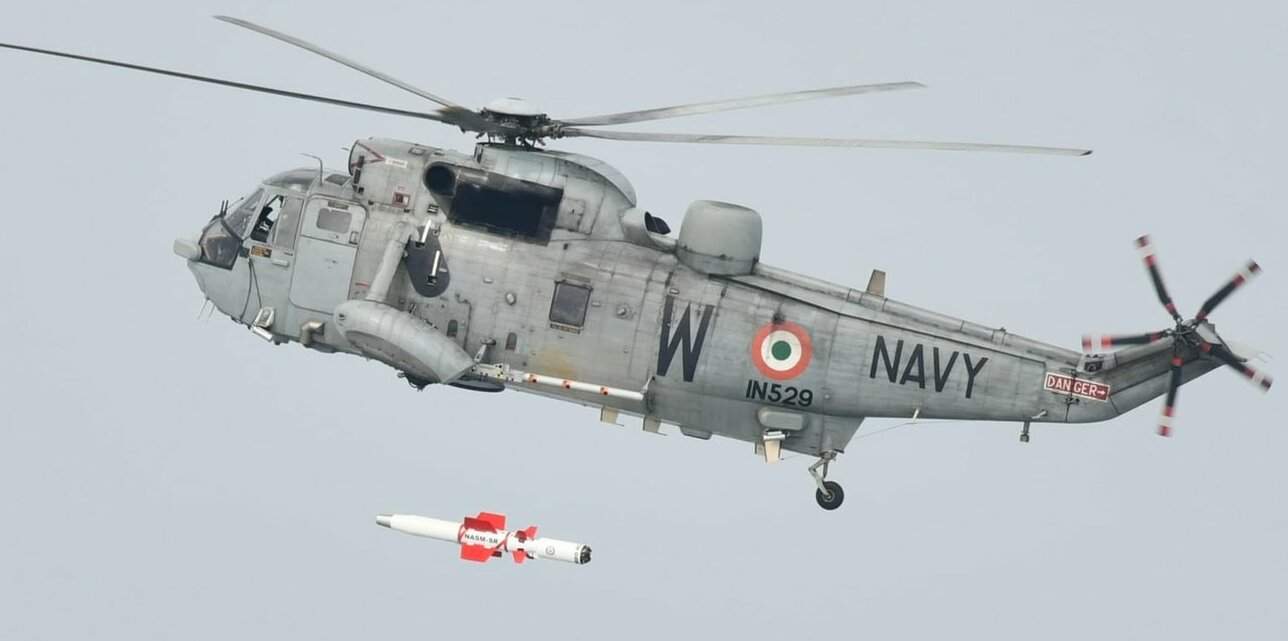
- Westland Sea King test launching NASM-SR
- Type: Naval anti-ship missile
- Place of origin: India

Service history
- In service: Under development

Production history
- Designer: Research Centre Imarat
- Manufacturer: Adani Defence & Aerospace; ICOMM Tele Limited

Specifications
- Mass: 380 kg (840 lb)
- Length: 3.6 m (12 ft)
- Diameter: 300 mm (12 in)
- Warhead: Multi-EFP, PCB
- Warhead weight: 100 kg (220 lb)
- Detonation mechanism: Radio proximity fuze
- Engine: Solid-propellant rocket + ejectable booster and sustainer engine
- Propellant: Solid fuel
- Operational range: 55 km (34 mi)
- Flight altitude: 50m to 3km
- Maximum speed: Mach 0.8
- Guidance system: Mid-course: FOG-INS + radar altimeter + two-way datalink Terminal: IIR
- Launch platform: Westland Sea King, MH-60R, HAL Dhruv

NASM–SR or Naval Anti-Ship Missile–Short Range is the first indigenous air-launched anti-ship missile being developed by the Defence Research and Development Organisation for the Indian Navy. The missile is manufactured by Adani Defence & Aerospace under DcPP programme.

NASM-SR features lock-on after launch with automatic target selection. The missile can strike in sea skimming and lofted trajectory mode. It supports fire-and-forget operation in all weather conditions, day or night. Re-targeting is available through two-way datalink (human-in-the-loop system).

== Development ==
Since 1980s, the Indian Navy has been using Sea Eagle anti-ship missile on its Westland Sea King Mk.42B multipurpose helicopter. The NASM-SR is intended as a replacement for the Sea Eagle missile which restricted flight range and increased take-off weight. The development of NASM-SR was made public for the first time in 2018 by the then Minister of Defence Nirmala Sitharaman. Fund of ₹436.06 crore (equivalent to ₹583 crore or US$61 million in 2023) for the development was also allocated in the same year.

Research Center Imarat worked with the Defense Research and Development Laboratory, the High Energy Materials Research Laboratory, and the Terminal Ballistics Research Laboratory to develop the missile.

The NASM-SR can be easily adapted to launch from ships and land-based vehicles. DRDO is speculated to be developing a long range version of it for attacking land targets. As the Sea King Helicopters are being phased out, the NASM-SR will be equipped on Indian Navy's newly acquired MH-60R naval helicopters.

== Design ==
The design and specifications of the new missile was revealed at the DefExpo 2020. The specification showed Mach 0.8 capable air launched anti-ship missile with a range of 55 km. The missile has an indigenous Imaging Infra-Red (IIR) seeker immune to jamming and state-of-the-art navigation system.

As reported, the missile is equipped with indigenous fibre-optic gyroscope-based inertial navigation system (INS) and a radar altimeter for mid-course guidance, along with an integrated avionics module, electro-mechanical actuators for aerodynamic and jet vane control, thermal batteries, and a PCB warhead.

The missile features human-in-the-loop system. It allows the pilot of the helicopter to launch the missile in bearing-only lock-on after launch mode towards a large target over a "specified zone of search" and later, in the terminal phase, locking onto a "smaller hidden target" (more precise target) improving the accuracy of the missile. The missile is also equipped high-bandwidth two-way datalink to relay live images from its seeker to the pilot for the in-flight retargeting. These features were operationally demonstrated in 2025.

== Testing ==
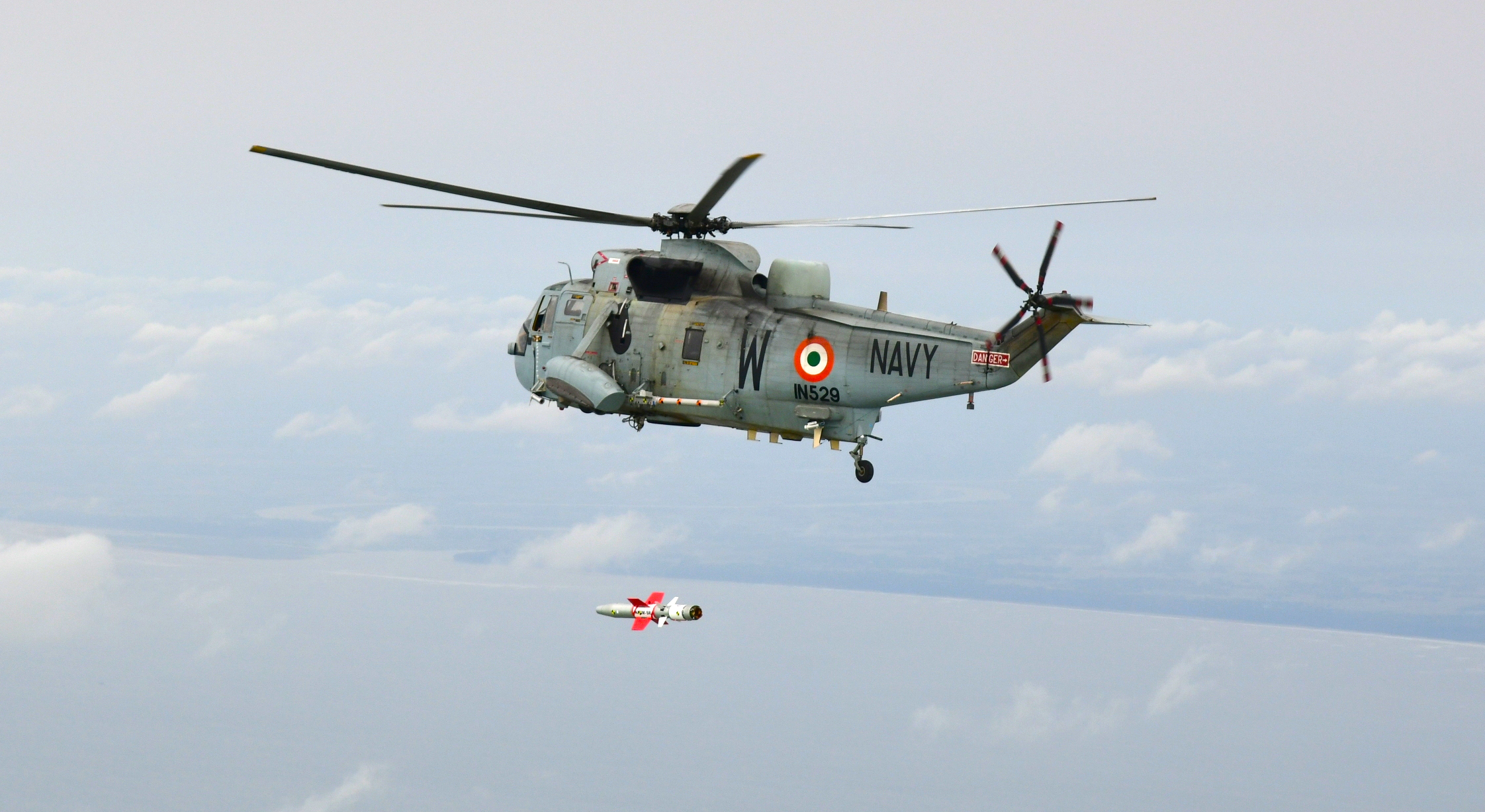
Maiden flight test of NASM-SR

- Indian Navy successfully carried out the first test of the missile from a Sea King Mk.42B helicopter on 18 May 2022. On maiden test firing, NASM-SR demonstrated its sea skimming capability and approaches the target at 5 metres above the sea level. The maiden test was successful, and the missile is said to have reached the designated target with high degree of accuracy. It validated the control, guidance and mission algorithms.
- DRDO conducted successful guided flight trials of NASM-SR on 21 November 2023 in collaboration with Indian Navy.
- The NASM-SR missile was test fired by an Indian Naval SeaKing 42.B from Integrated Test Range, Chandipur, Odisha on 26 February 2025. The missile successfully hit a small ship target in sea skimming mode at maximum range. The missile deployed its indigenous IIR seeker for terminal guidance.
- On 29 April 2026, DRDO conducted the maiden salvo launch of NASM-SR from an Indian Navy Sea King helicopter in the Bay of Bengal off the Odisha coast. During the trial, two missiles were launched in quick succession, demonstrating the waterline hit capability. All test objectives were fully met as per the data captured using various range tracking instruments deployed from the Integrated Test Range, Odisha.

== See also ==
- NASM-MR – Indian anti-ship missile system
- Sea Killer – (Italy)
- Sea Venom – (United Kingdom)
- Sea Eagle – (United Kingdom)
