= Type 91 air-to-ship missile =

Type 91 air-to-ship missile, ASM-1C
- Type: Anti-ship cruise missiles
- Place of origin: Japan

Service history
- In service: 1991

Production history
- Manufacturer: Mitsubishi Heavy Industries

Specifications
- Length: 4m
- Diameter: 0.35m
- Engine: Turbojet engine
- Operational range: 180km
- Flight altitude: 5-6m
- Guidance system: Inertial and active radar
- Launch platform: Air

The Type 91 air-to-ship missile (91式空対艦誘導弾, ASM-1C) is an anti-ship missile developed in Japan.

An air-launched variant of the SSM-1, the ASM-1C is carried by Japan Maritime Self-Defense Force P-3C Orions and their successor, the Kawasaki P-1.
