= ASM-3 =

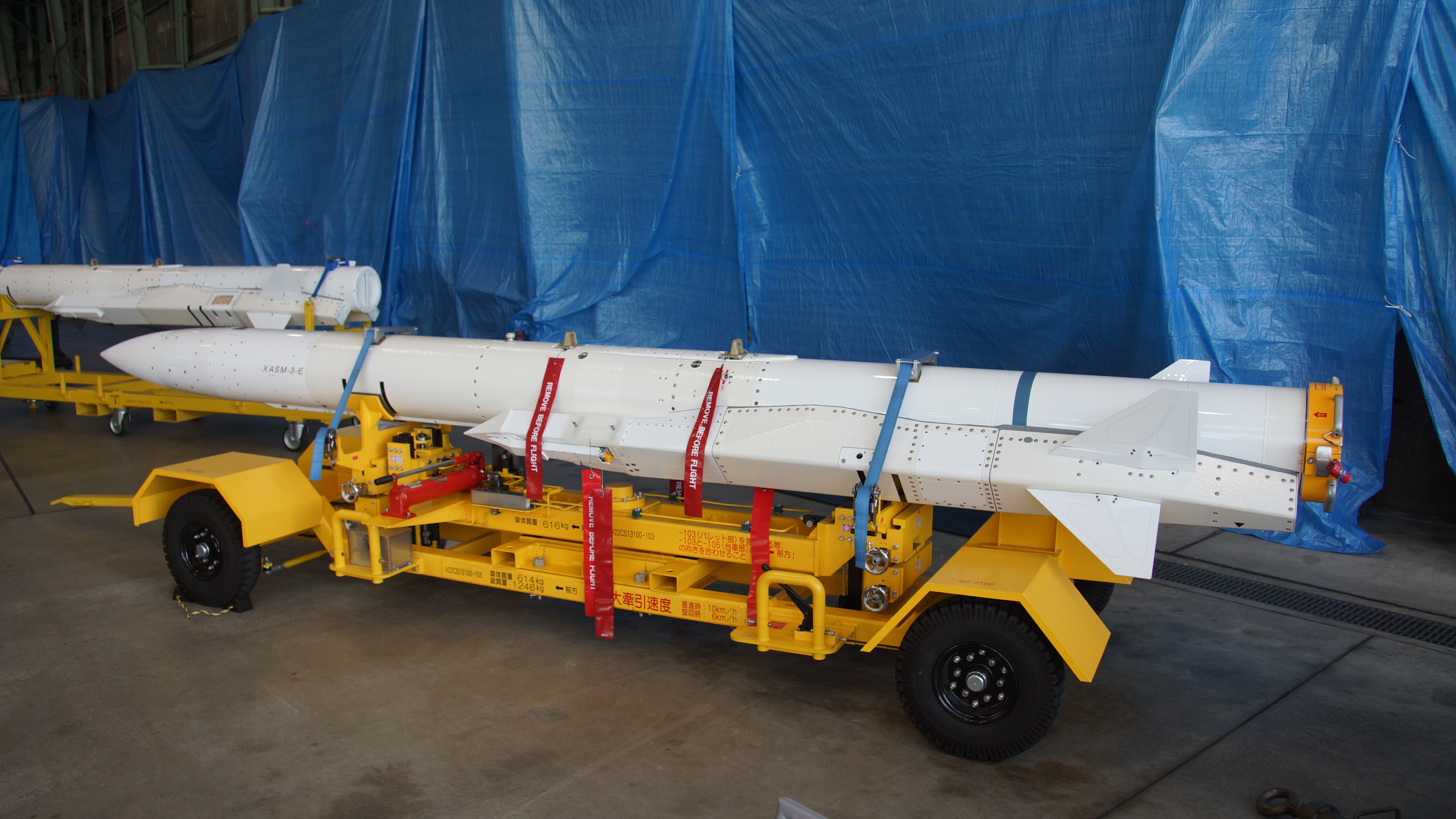
- XASM-3-E (fixed combustion test model) left rear view at Gifu Air Field
- Type: Air-to-surface anti-ship missile
- Place of origin: Japan

Service history
- Used by: Japan Air Self-Defense Force

Production history
- Manufacturer: Mitsubishi Heavy Industries

Specifications
- Mass: 940 kg (2,070 lb)
- Length: 6 m (20 ft)
- Engine: Integral Rocket Ramjet
- Operational range: Original: 200 km (110 nmi; 120 mi); Improved version: about 400km(ASM-3A); Extended Range: 1,000 km (540 nmi; 620 mi)
- Maximum speed: Mach 3+
- Guidance system: Inertial/GPS, mid-course correction terminal guidance: Active radar homing/Passive radar guidance
- Launch platform: Mitsubishi F-2

The ASM-3 is a supersonic anti-ship missile being developed by Mitsubishi Heavy Industries to replace the ASM-1 and ASM-2 missiles. The major launch platform is the Mitsubishi F-2. Planned Initial Operational Capability was 2016. Since the original model of ASM-3 had a short range of 200 km, it was not deployed immediately, and an improved model was developed from 2017 to 2020, and deployment of ASM-3A with a range of about 300～400 km started in 2021. In the future, it may also have a range of 400 km or more.

== History ==
In November 2015, Japan's Ministry of Defense announced it would conduct a live-fire experiment of the XASM-3 in 2016, targeting the decommissioned ship JDS Shirane. In February 2017, an F-2 carried out a jettison test of the missile as a precursor to a live firing. Mass production was planned to begin in 2018 but stopped due to the further upgrade program that has been planned. Footage of a test launch was released in August 2017.

== Improvement program ==
Despite its development being completed in 2017, the missile was not deployed because its range (200 km (110 nmi; 120 mi)) was deemed too short to effectively counter the Chinese Navy's long range air-defense. In March 2019, it was reported that the ASM-3 would have its range extended to 400 km (220 nmi; 250 mi) or more.

In December 2019, the Japanese Defense Ministry secured ¥10.3 billion to upgrade the missile in its 2020 budget. In December 2020, Japan MoD announced the ASM-3A, a variant of the ASM-3 with extended range, and an intention to mass-produce it with the 2021 defense budget. Another upgraded version of the ASM-3, the ASM-3 (Kai), is also under development.

The ASM-3 may be used by the F-2's successor once the aircraft retires in the 2030s.

== Variants ==
- ASM-3A - Extended range version of ASM-3.
- ASM-3 Kai (Japanese: 改) - Improved version of ASM-3A.

== See also ==
- Missile designation

Related development

- ASM-1 – (Japan)
- ASM-2 – (Japan)

Related lists

- List of missiles
- Type 80 air-to-ship missile – (Japan)
- Type 88 surface-to-ship missile – (Japan)
- Type 90 ship-to-ship missile – (Japan)
- Type 93 air-to-ship missile – (Japan)

Comparable missiles

- Kh-31 – (Soviet Union)
- Kh-41 – (Soviet Union)
- Kh-61 – (Russia)
- YJ-91 – (China)
- YJ-12 – (China)
- Hsiung Feng III – (Taiwan)
- ANS (anti navire supersonique, cancelled French project)
