= Type 80 air-to-ship missile =

Japanese anti-ship missile

Type 80 air-to-ship missile, ASM-1
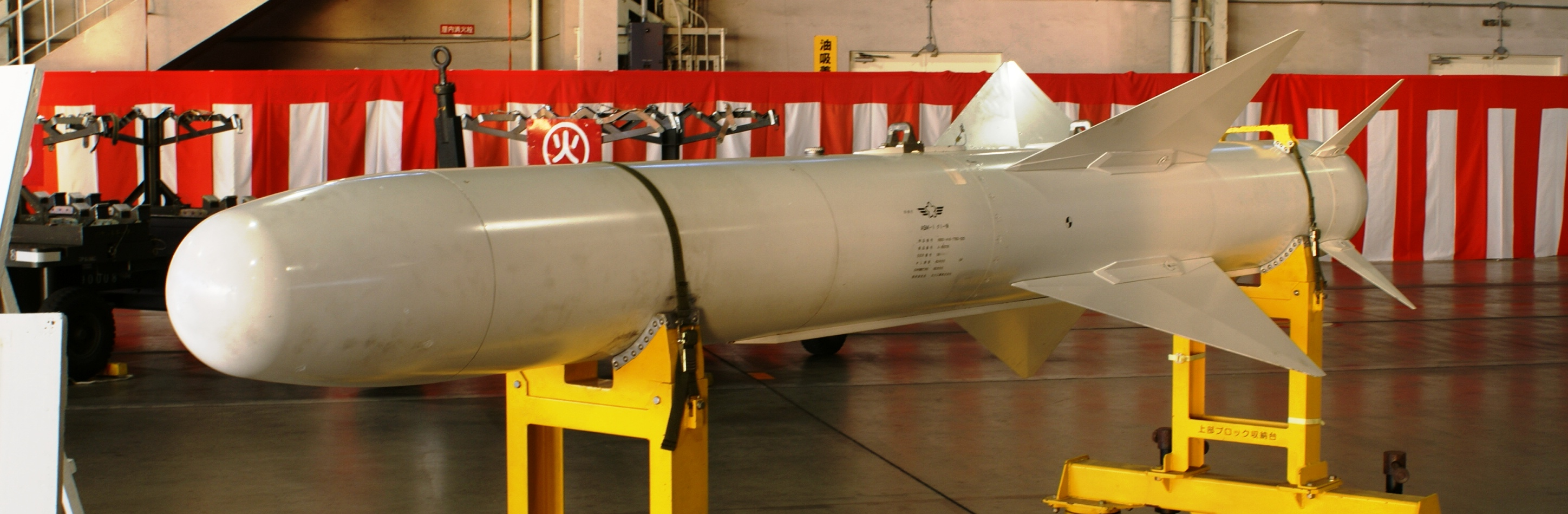
- Type: Anti-ship missile
- Place of origin: Japan

Service history
- In service: 1980
- Used by: Japan

Production history
- Manufacturer: Mitsubishi Heavy Industries

Specifications
- Mass: 600 kg (1,323 lb)
- Length: 4.0 m (13.1 ft)
- Diameter: 350 mm (13.8 in)
- Wingspan: 1.2 m (3.9 ft)
- Warhead: HE
- Warhead weight: 150 kg (331 lb)
- Engine: solid rocket
- Propellant: Single stage solid propellent Rocket motor
- Operational range: 50 km (27 nmi)
- Maximum speed: 0.9 Mach
- Guidance system: Inertial guidance and terminal active radar homing
- Launch platform: Air

Type 80 air-to-ship missile (Japanese: 80式空対艦誘導弾, ASM-1) is an air-launched anti-ship missile developed by Mitsubishi Heavy Industries. It entered service with the Japan Air Self-Defense Force in 1980. The major launch platforms for the Type 80 are the Mitsubishi F-1, and the P-3 Orion.

The missile is primarily intended as an air-launched coastal defence weapon. In fact, it is somewhat more capable than this, able to engage both sea and land targets such as buildings and bridges. The Type 80 also serves as the basis of several other weapons; it forms part of the ground-launched SSM-1 system and was also developed into the Type 88 SSM (surface-to-ship missile), the Type 90 ship-to-ship missile, and the Type 91 and Type 93 ASMs.

The ASM-1 has been superseded (although not altogether replaced) by the ASM-3, which is currently in production. The ASM-1 is still in service with the JSDF in both ground and air-launched configurations.

== See also ==
- Missile designation

Related lists

- Anti-ship missile
- Type 88 surface-to-ship missile
- Type 90 ship-to-ship missile
- ASM-2
- ASM-3
