= Type 90 ship-to-ship missile =

Japanese ship-launched anti-ship missile

Type 90 ship-to-ship missile, SSM-1B
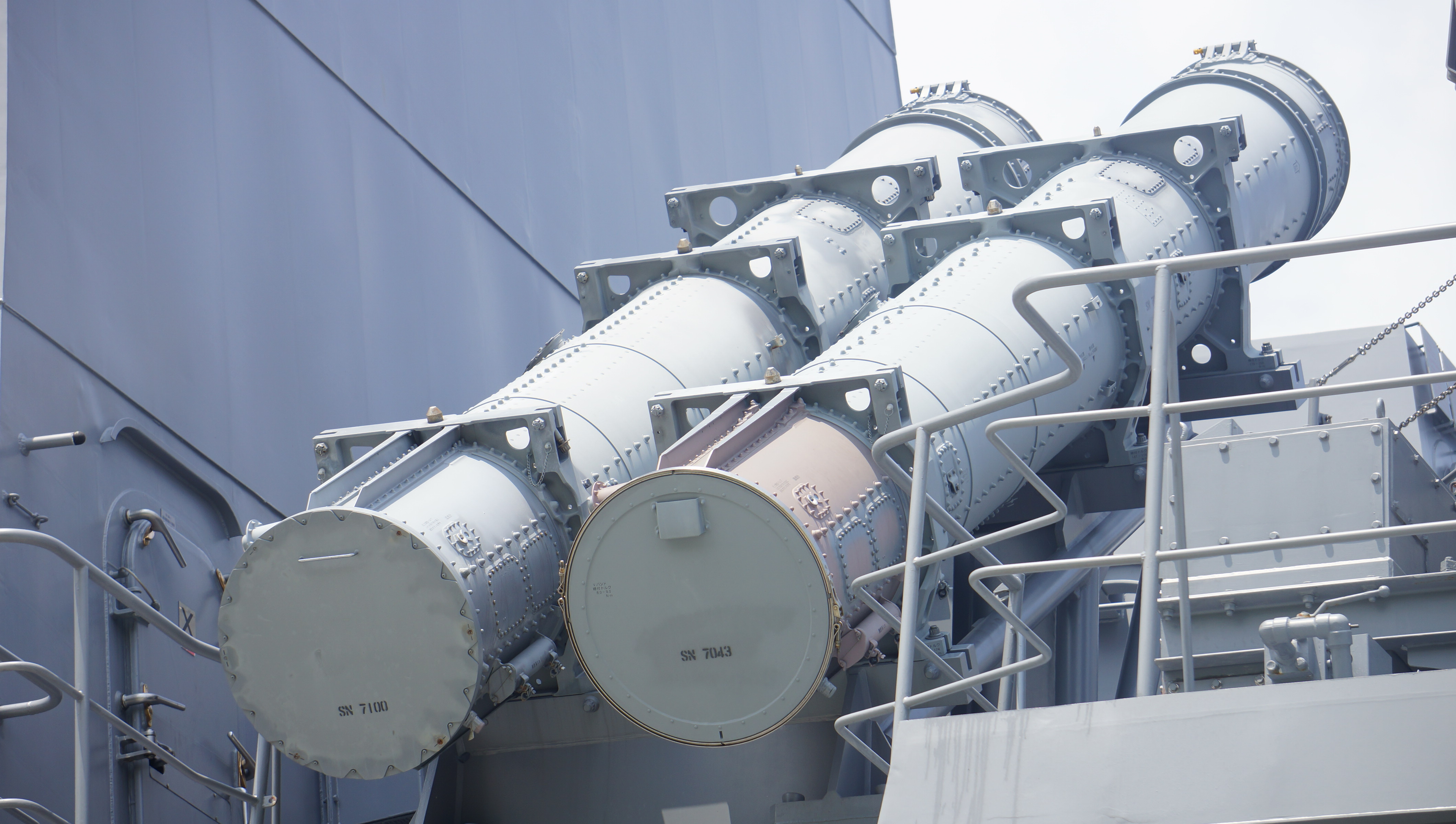
- Type-90 canistered launchers, starboard of JS Fuyuzuki DD-118 (4th Akizuki-class destroyer) at Maizuru Naval Base in 2014 July 27.
- Type: Anti-ship cruise missile
- Place of origin: Japan

Service history
- In service: 1990
- Used by: Japan Maritime Self-Defense Force

Production history
- Manufacturer: Mitsubishi Heavy Industries
- No. built: >384

Specifications
- Mass: 661 kg (1,457 lb)
- Length: 5.08 m (16.7 ft)
- Diameter: 350 mm (13.8 in)
- Wingspan: 1.2 m (3.9 ft)
- Warhead: high explosive
- Warhead weight: 260 kg (570 lb)
- Engine: TJM2 turbojet + 1 solid rocket booster
- Operational range: 150–200 km (81–108 nmi)
- Flight altitude: 5-6m
- Maximum speed: 1,150 km/h (715 mph)
- Guidance system: Inertial guidance and terminal active radar homing
- Launch platform: Asahi, Akizuki, Atago, Takanami, Murasame destroyer classes; Hayabusa-class missile boats

The Type 90 ship-to-ship missile (Japanese: 90式艦対艦誘導弾, SSM-1B) is a ship-launched anti-ship missile developed by Japan's Mitsubishi Heavy Industries. The Type-90 entered service in 1990. It is a naval version of the truck-launched Type 88 (SSM-1) missile, which in turn was developed from the air-launched Type 80 (ASM-1) missile. The Japan Maritime Self-Defense Force bought 384 of the missiles, which were fitted to their Murasame, Takanami, Atago, Akizuki, and Asahi classes of destroyers, as well as Hayabusa-class fast-attack missile boats. With a range of 150 km (81 nmi), high subsonic speed and a 260 kg (570 lb) warhead, it was first installed on the 9 Murasame-class destroyers that started series production in 1994.

== See also ==
- Type 80 air-to-ship missile
- Type 88 surface-to-ship missile
- Type 93 air-to-ship missile
- XASM-3
