= Type 88 surface-to-ship missile =

Japanese truck-launched anti-ship missile

Type 88 surface-to-ship missile, SSM-1
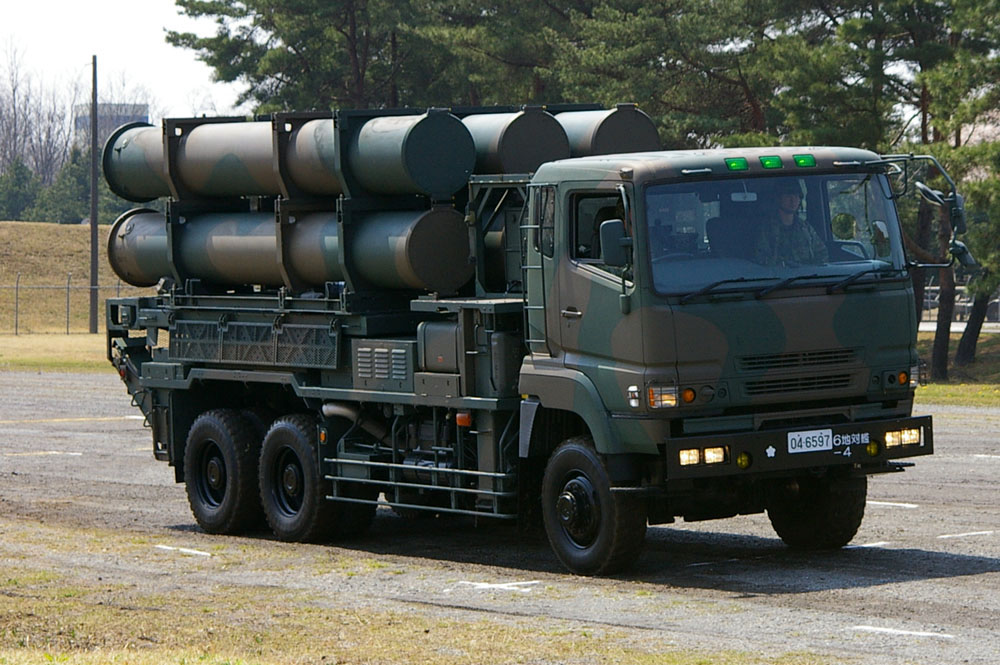
- Type: Anti-ship cruise missile
- Place of origin: Japan

Service history
- In service: 1988

Production history
- Manufacturer: Mitsubishi Heavy Industries

Specifications
- Mass: 661 kg (1,457 lb)
- Length: 5.08 m (16.7 ft)
- Diameter: 350 mm (13.8 in)
- Warhead: HE
- Warhead weight: 225 kg (496 lb)
- Engine: Mitsubishi TJM2 turbojet + one solid rocket booster
- Operational range: 100 km (54 nmi; 62 mi) or 150 km (81 nmi; 93 mi) or 180 km (97 nmi; 112 mi) (sources vary)
- Flight altitude: 5-6 m
- Maximum speed: High subsonic (approximately Mach 0.93)
- Guidance system: Inertial guidance and terminal active radar homing
- Launch platform: Truck (Fuso Super Great, Fuso The Great)

The Type 88 surface-to-ship missile (88式地対艦誘導弾, SSM-1) is a truck-mounted subsonic sea skimming anti-ship missile developed by Japan's Mitsubishi Heavy Industries in the late 1980s. It is a land-based version of the air-launched Type 80 (ASM-1) missile; in turn it was developed into the ship-launched Type 90 (SSM-1B) missile. The missile system is succeeded by the Type 12 surface-to-ship missile.

== History ==
The Japan Ground Self-Defense Force bought 54 transporter erector launchers, each carrying six Type 88 missiles, for use as coastal batteries. With a range of 180 km (97 nmi; 112 mi), high subsonic speed and 225 kg (496 lb) warhead, it is similar to the US Harpoon missile.

In 2015, an upgrade of the Type 88 became operational called the Type 12. The Type 12 features INS with mid-course GPS guidance and better precision due to enhanced TERCOM and target discrimination capabilities. The weapon is networked, where initial and mid-course targeting can be provided by other platforms, and also boasts shorter reload times, reduced lifecycle costs, and a range of 200 km (110 nmi; 120 mi).

During the Balikatan annual military exercise on May 6, 2026, the Japan Ground Self-Defense Force launched two Type-88 anti-ship missiles from the Philippines at the decommissioned 890-ton Philippine Navy ship BRP Quezon. While the first missile hit and contributed to sinking the vessel, video indicates the second missile missed by a few meters, passing the target without a hit. The target was located around 75 km off the coast of Paoay in the northern Philippines, and the missiles reached the BRP Quezon within six minutes of the launch.

On 1 June 2026, it was reported that the Philippines was considering acquiring the Type 88.

== Configuration ==
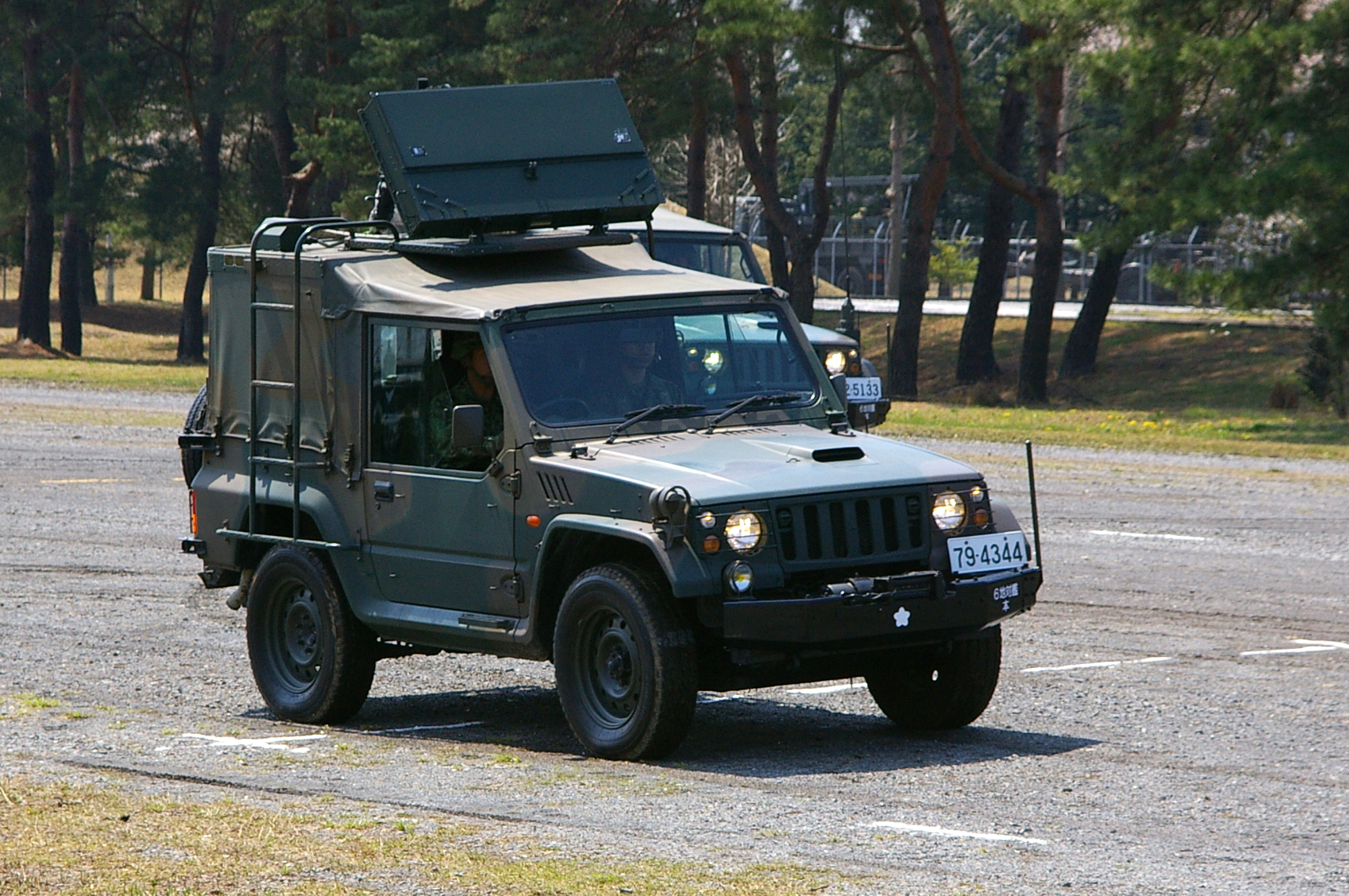
Radar vehicle (JTPS-P15)

The basic launching vehicle configuration comprises a 6×6 Type 74 tactical truck with a maximum of six missile pods. The battery of type 88 includes four launch/transporters, a single target search radar, a single missile control station, four reloaders, and a digital communications station. The missile system takes about 45 minutes to transition from a camping or traveling position to combat-ready status. The missiles can be launched in two-second intervals. Usually, the SSM-1 is launched from within 100 km (62 mi) of the target.

== See also ==
- Type 80 air-to-ship missile
- Type 90 ship-to-ship missile
- Type 93 air-to-ship missile
- Type 12 surface-to-ship missile
- XASM-3
