= Type 93 air-to-ship missile =

Japanese air-launched anti-ship missile

Type 93 to-ship missile, ASM-2
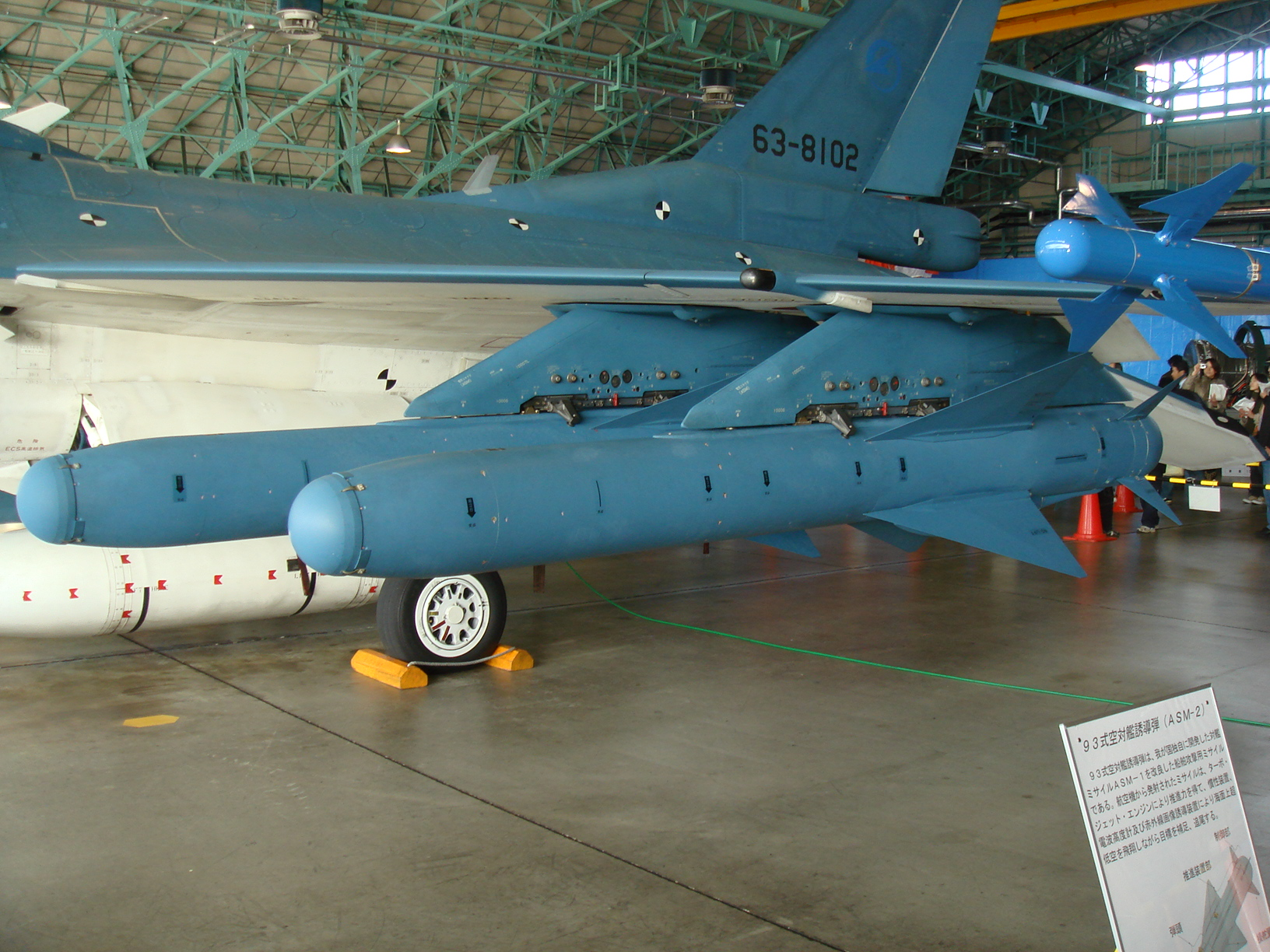
- Type: Anti-ship, Anti-ground (ASM2b) cruise missile
- Place of origin: Japan

Service history
- In service: 1995-Present
- Used by: Japan Self-Defense Forces

Production history
- Manufacturer: Mitsubishi Heavy Industries

Specifications
- Mass: 530kg
- Length: 4m
- Diameter: 0.35m
- Engine: Turbojet engine
- Operational range: 170km
- Flight altitude: 5-6m
- Guidance system: Inertial guidance and IR Imaging, GPS (ASM2b)
- Launch platform: Aircraft: Mitsubishi F-2; F-4EJ Kai Phantom II

The Type 93 air-to-ship missile (93式空対艦誘導弾, ASM-2) is an air-launched anti-ship missile developed in Japan. It was developed by using technology from the Type 88 surface-to-ship missile

This missile is used by the Japan Air Self-Defense Force.

The ASM-2 will be replaced by the ASM-3.

== See also ==
- Missile designation
- Anti-ship missile

Related development

- ASM-1
- ASM-3
- Type 88 surface-to-ship missile
- Type 90 ship-to-ship missile
