= 4th Air Wing (JASDF) =

Japanese military unit

- 第4航空団
- Active: February 16, 1958
- Country: Japan
- Branch: Japan Air Self-Defense Force
- Part of: Air Training Command
- Garrison/HQ: Matsushima Air Field

Aircraft flown
- Trainer: Mitsubishi F-2B, Kawasaki T-4

The 4th Air Wing (第4航空団, dai-yon-koukudan) is a wing of the Japan Air Self-Defense Force. It comes under the authority of Air Training Command. It is based at Matsushima Air Field in Iwate Prefecture.

It consists of two squadrons:

- 21st Fighter Training Squadron (Mitsubishi F-2B)
- 11th Squadron (Blue Impulse) (Kawasaki T-4)
