= Mitsubishi F-2 =

Japanese supersonic jet fighter

F-2
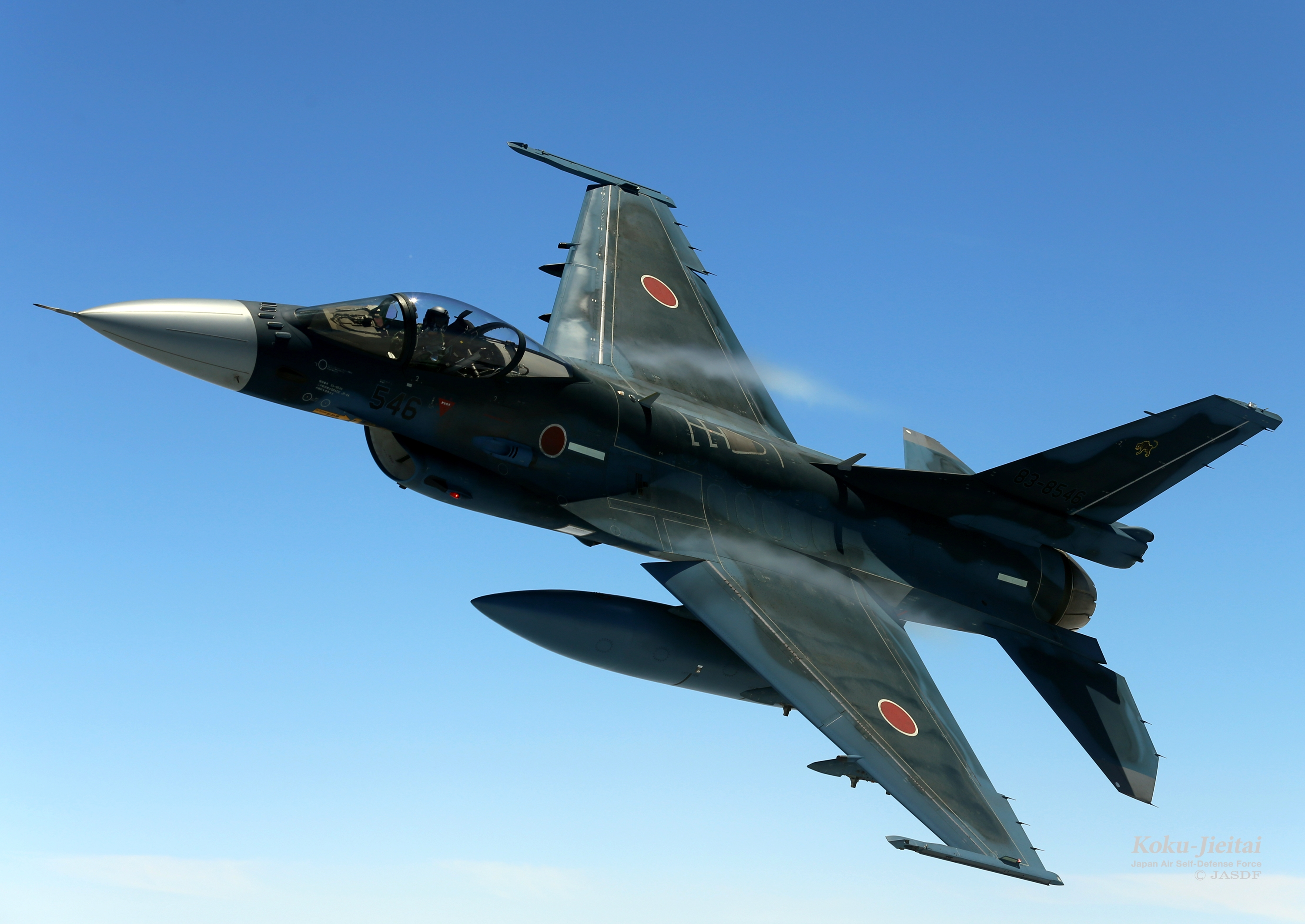
- Mitsubishi F-2A

General information
- Type: Multirole fighter
- National origin: Japan / United States
- Manufacturer: Mitsubishi Heavy Industries / Lockheed Martin
- Status: In service
- Primary user: Japan Air Self-Defense Force
- Number built: 98 (including 4 prototypes)

History
- Manufactured: 1995–2011
- Introduction date: 2000
- First flight: 7 October 1995
- Developed from: General Dynamics F-16 Fighting Falcon

The Mitsubishi F-2 is a multirole fighter that was derived from the General Dynamics F-16 Fighting Falcon, and manufactured by Mitsubishi Heavy Industries and Lockheed Martin for the Japan Air Self-Defense Force, with a 60/40 split in manufacturing between Japan and the United States. The basis of the F-2's design is the F-16C Block 40. Production started in 1996 and the first aircraft entered service in 2000.

The first 76 aircraft entered service by 2008, with a total of 98 airframes produced. The first active electronically scanned array (AESA) radar on a combat aircraft was the J/APG-1 introduced on the Mitsubishi F-2 in 1995.

The F-2 is nicknamed Viper Zero, a reference to the F-16's unofficial nickname of "Viper" and the Mitsubishi A6M Zero.

== Development ==
=== US–Japan negotiations ===
The JASDF and its contractors considered developing a Japanese-designed, Japanese-produced replacement for the aging Mitsubishi F-1 fighter as early as 1981. A formal feasibility study commenced in 1985.

Japan's initial intentions to develop the aircraft domestically built upon Japan's previous success in producing the F-15J fighter under license from McDonnell Douglas.

Japanese defense contractors argued that they needed to build a new aircraft from the beginning in order to develop the skill of their engineers and, in turn, develop the Japanese aircraft industry.

As the program began to take formal shape in 1985, several United States officials raised concerns that the program would result in an inferior aircraft, and would weaken the U.S.–Japan defense relationship. Pentagon officials advocated co-production or co-development of an aircraft based on the F-16 or F/A-18 platform, as they believed that Japan would not agree to buy U.S. aircraft.

In early 1987, the U.S., through Caspar Weinberger and other administration officials, began formally pressuring Japan to execute the project as a U.S.–Japan bilateral joint development. The timing of this lobbying coincided with the height of "Japan bashing" in the United States: the Toshiba-Kongsberg scandal, in which Toshiba was found to have sold propeller milling machinery to the Soviet Union in violation of COCOM sanctions, became public in May 1987. Japan's negotiating stance changed amid the risk of deterioration in U.S.–Japan relations.

The Reagan administration and Nakasone government announced the joint project in October 1987.

Under a memorandum of understanding signed in November 1988, General Dynamics would provide its F-16 Fighting Falcon technology to Mitsubishi Heavy Industries, and would handle up to 45 percent of the development work as a joint principal contractor.

On the American side, senior officials in the U.S. State Department and Defense Department supported the project as a means for the U.S. to access Japanese technology and as a means of strengthening U.S.–Japan relations, but the Commerce Department and many members of Congress opposed the project due to the risk of strengthening Japan's ability to compete with U.S. aerospace firms. Opponents in Congress argued that Japan should acquire American aircraft in order to offset the trade deficit between the two countries. More than twenty members of the Senate demanded official review of the deal.

After George H. W. Bush took office as U.S. president in January 1989, the U.S. government responded to domestic criticism of the deal by seeking "clarification" of the terms of the MOU, which the Japanese government viewed as an attempt to re-negotiate it. The Bush administration was particularly concerned with the risks of transferring technology to Japan.

Bush announced a revised agreement in April 1989, shortly before the resignation of his Japanese counterpart Noboru Takeshita, under which Japanese access to flight control and weapons control software was limited, while the U.S. was to have access to any new technology that Japan developed for the project. American contractors were guaranteed at least 40% of the production for the program. Congress ratified the deal in June 1989 while expressing official displeasure with it.

Japanese lawmaker Shintaro Ishihara was a vocal critic of the final deal, writing in 1990 that "our Foreign Ministry and other Government agencies decided it was better to eat humble pie than incur Uncle Sam's wrath on yet another bilateral issue," and pointing out that "we give away our most advanced defense technology to the United States but pay licensing and patent fees for each piece of technology we use."

=== Production ===
Work started in the FS-X program, initially given the company designation Mitsubishi SX-3. In 1984 General Dynamics had offered an enlarged version of the F-16 to the US Air Force and considered entering it as a low cost alternative in the Advanced Tactical Fighter competition. Neither came to fruition, however this concept became the starting point for F-2 development. The F-2 has an enlarged wing design, similar to that of the Agile Falcon, but much of the electronics was further updated to 1990s standards. Japan selected the fighter to replace the F-4EJ and supplement the F-15J, its main air superiority fighter. The program involved technology transfer from the U.S. to Japan and vice versa.

Responsibility for cost sharing was split 60% by Japan and 40% by the U.S. Lockheed Martin would manufacture all the aft fuselages and wing leading-edge flaps and eight of the ten left-hand wingboxes.

The F-2 program was controversial, because the unit cost, which includes development costs, is roughly four times that of a Block 50/52 F-16, which does not include development costs. Inclusion of development costs distorts the incremental unit cost (this happens with most modern military aircraft), though even at the planned procurement levels, the price per aircraft was somewhat high. The initial plan of 141 F-2s would have reduced the unit cost by up to US$10 million(€7.5 million), not including reduced cost from mass production. As of 2008, 94 aircraft were planned.

The F-2's maiden flight was on 7 October 1995. Later that year, the Japanese government approved an order for 141 (but that was soon cut to 130), to enter service by 1999; structural problems resulted in service entry being delayed until 2000. Because of issues with cost-efficiency, orders for the aircraft were curtailed to 98 (including four prototypes) in 2004. Flight testing of the four prototypes were conducted by the Japan Defense Agency at Gifu Air Field.

The last of 94 production aircraft ordered under contract was delivered to the Defense Ministry on 27 September 2011. During the roll-out ceremony of the last production F-2 fighter jet, Mitsubishi Heavy Industries confirmed that production of the F-2 would end and no more F-2 fighters will be produced by the manufacturer. As of 2014 there are 61 single-seaters flying, and 21 two-seat trainers.

== Design ==
General Electric, Kawasaki, Honeywell, Raytheon, NEC, Hazeltine, and Kokusai Electric were among the primary component sub-contractors. Lockheed Martin supplied the aft fuselage, leading-edge slats, stores management system, a large percentage of wingboxes (as part of two-way technology transfer agreements), and other components. Kawasaki built the midsection of the fuselage, as well as the doors to the main wheel and the engine, while the forward fuselage and wings were built by Mitsubishi.

Some of the avionics were supplied by Lockheed Martin, and the digital fly-by-wire system was jointly developed by Japan Aviation Electric and Honeywell (formerly Allied Signal). Contractors for communication systems and IFF interrogators included: Raytheon, NEC, Hazeltine, and Kokusai Electric. The fire control radar, IRS, the mission computer, and the EW system were developed by Japan.

In addition, the flight control computer, the flight control laws and related computer software were essentially all developed and integrated by Japan. Final assembly was done in Japan, by MHI at its Komaki-South facility in Nagoya.

F-2 and F-16 compared

Larger wings give an aircraft better payload and maneuverability in proportion to its thrust, but also tend to add weight to the airframe in various ways. More weight can have negative effects on acceleration, climbing, payload, and range. To make the larger wings lighter, the skin, spars, ribs and cap of the wings were made from graphite-epoxy composite and co-cured in an autoclave. This was the first application of co-cured technology to a production tactical fighter.

This technology for the wings encountered some teething problems, but proved to be a leading-edge use of a technology that provides weight savings, improved range, and some stealth benefits. This technology was then transferred back to America, as part of the program's industrial partnership.

The F-2 has three display screens, including a liquid crystal display from Yokogawa.

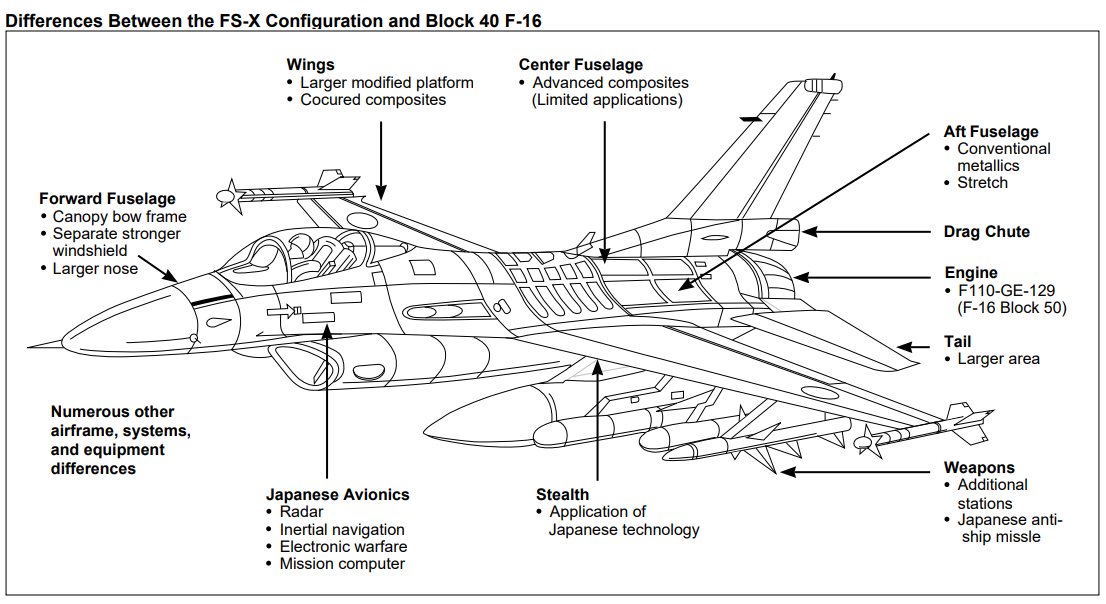
Differences between F-2 and F-16 Block 40

Mitsubishi used the existing F-16 design as a reference guide for design work, and more than 95% of F-16 engineering drawings were changed for the F-2.

When compared to the F-16 Block 40, the F-2 differs in the following aspects:

- An increase in wingspan and root chord, with 25 percent more wing area. The wings also feature a tapered trailing edge.
- A larger tailplane.
- A longer fuselage.
- A longer and wider nose to accommodate the J/APG-1 or J/APG-2 active electronically scanned array (AESA) radar. Almost simultaneously with a single squadron of USAF F-15C Eagles, the F-2 was the first operational military aircraft in the world to feature an AESA radar, before the F-22 Raptor's AN/APG-77 AESA radar.
- A three-piece cockpit canopy, providing better protection against bird strikes.
- Ten underwing hardpoints as opposed to six on the F-16. However, a maximum of four underwing hardpoints can be used per wing.
- Composite materials used to reduce overall weight and radar signature.
- An integrated electronic warfare system by Mitsubishi Electric. This system is omitted on the F-2B.
- An original flight control system.
- Equipment and OFP related to the avionics system differ from the F-16 in many aspects.

The F-2 is also equipped with a drogue parachute, which is an optional feature on the F-16.

== Operational history ==
On 7 February 2013, two Russian Air Force Sukhoi Su-27 fighters briefly entered Japanese airspace off Rishiri Island near Hokkaido, flying south over the Sea of Japan before turning back to the north. Four F-2 fighters were scrambled to visually confirm the Russian planes, warning them by radio to leave their airspace.

A photo taken by a JASDF pilot of one of the two Su-27s was released by the Japan Ministry of Defense. Russia denied the incursion, saying the jets were making routine flights near the disputed Kuril Islands.

On 22 August 2013, two Russian Tupolev Tu-142 Bear-F maritime patrol aircraft entered Japanese airspace near the major southern island of Kyushu for less than two minutes. F-2 fighters were scrambled in response.

== Variants ==
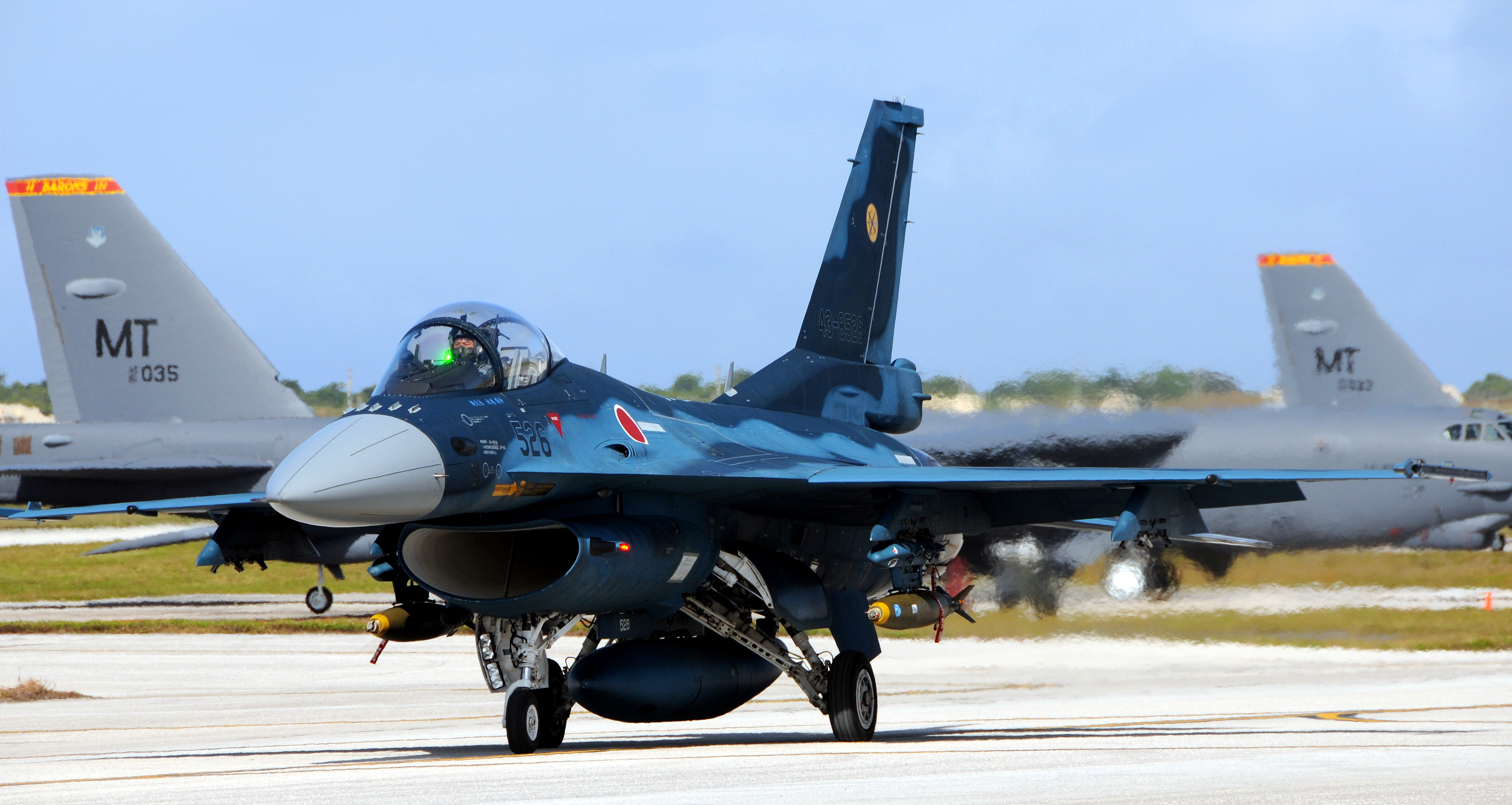
F-2 taxiing during the 2009 Cope North exercise

- XF-2A: Single-seat prototypes.
- XF-2B: Two-seat prototypes.
- F-2A: Single-seat fighter version.
- F-2B: Two-seat training version.
- F-2 Super Kai: Proposed version with the capability to carry CFTs (conformal fuel tanks), based on the F-16C Block 60. It was intended to replace the F-4EJ Kai Phantom II. It was rejected when the F-35A Lightning II was chosen.

== Operators ==
Japan

- Japan Air Self-Defense Force

As of March 2025, the JASDF operates 91 F-2A/Bs.

Air Defense Command

- Central Air Defense Force
  - 7th Air Wing, Hyakuri Air Base
    - 3rd Tactical Fighter Squadron (2001–present)
- Western Air Defense Force
  - 8th Wing, Tsuiki Air Base
    - 6th Tactical Fighter Squadron (2004–present)
    - 8th Tactical Fighter Squadron (2008–present)

Air Training Command

- 1st Technical School, Hamamatsu Air Base (2000–present)
- 4th Air Wing, Matsushima Air Base
  - 21st Fighter Training Squadron (Reactivated)

Air Development and Test Command

- Air Development and Test Wing, Gifu Air Base

== Accidents and incidents ==
- On 31 October 2007, an F-2B crashed during takeoff and subsequently caught fire at Nagoya Airfield in central Japan. The jet was being taken up on a test flight by Mitsubishi employees, after major maintenance and before being delivered to the JASDF. Both test pilots survived the incident with only minor injuries. It was eventually determined that improper wiring caused the crash.
- As a result of the 2011 Tōhoku earthquake and tsunami, 18 F-2Bs belonging to the 21st Fighter Squadron at Matsushima Air Base were damaged or destroyed. Of these 18, 5 were deemed beyond repair and have been scrapped. The remaining 13 F-2s were repaired at the estimated cost of ¥80 billion (2011) (equivalent to ¥91.8 billion or US$606.45 million in 2024). In the meantime, training duties carried out by the 21st Fighter Squadron have been transferred to other air bases. Repair work was completed by 2016, when the 21st Squadron returned to Matsushima.
- On 20 February 2019, an F-2B crashed during a training flight over the Sea of Japan. Both the flight instructor and pilot survived the accident.
- In April 2021, two F-2 jets (an F-2A and an F-2B) flying in formation, had a minor mid-air collision over Yamaguchi Prefecture. They safely landed afterwards with no reported injuries and little damage to the jets.
- On 7 August 2025, an F-2A stationed at Hyakuri Air Base crashed into the Pacific off Ibaraki Prefecture during a training flight. The pilot ejected and survived.

== Specifications (F-2A) ==
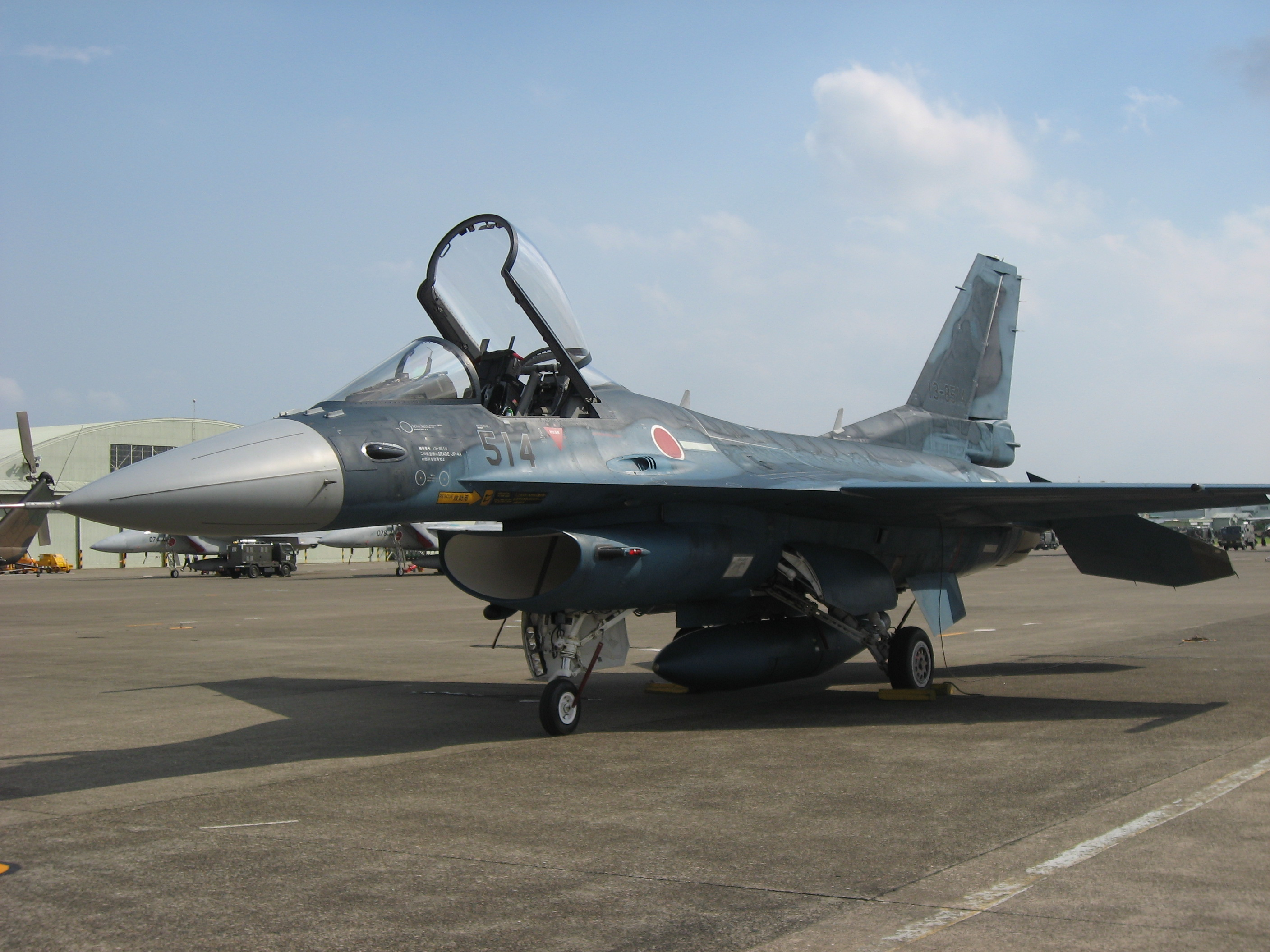
Mitsubishi F-2A

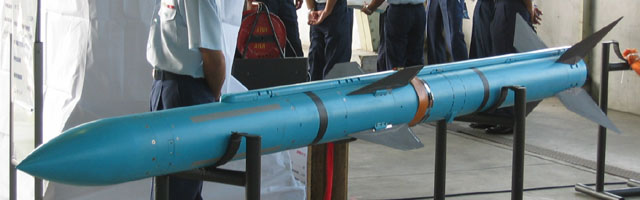
Mitsubishi AAM-4 air-to-air missile

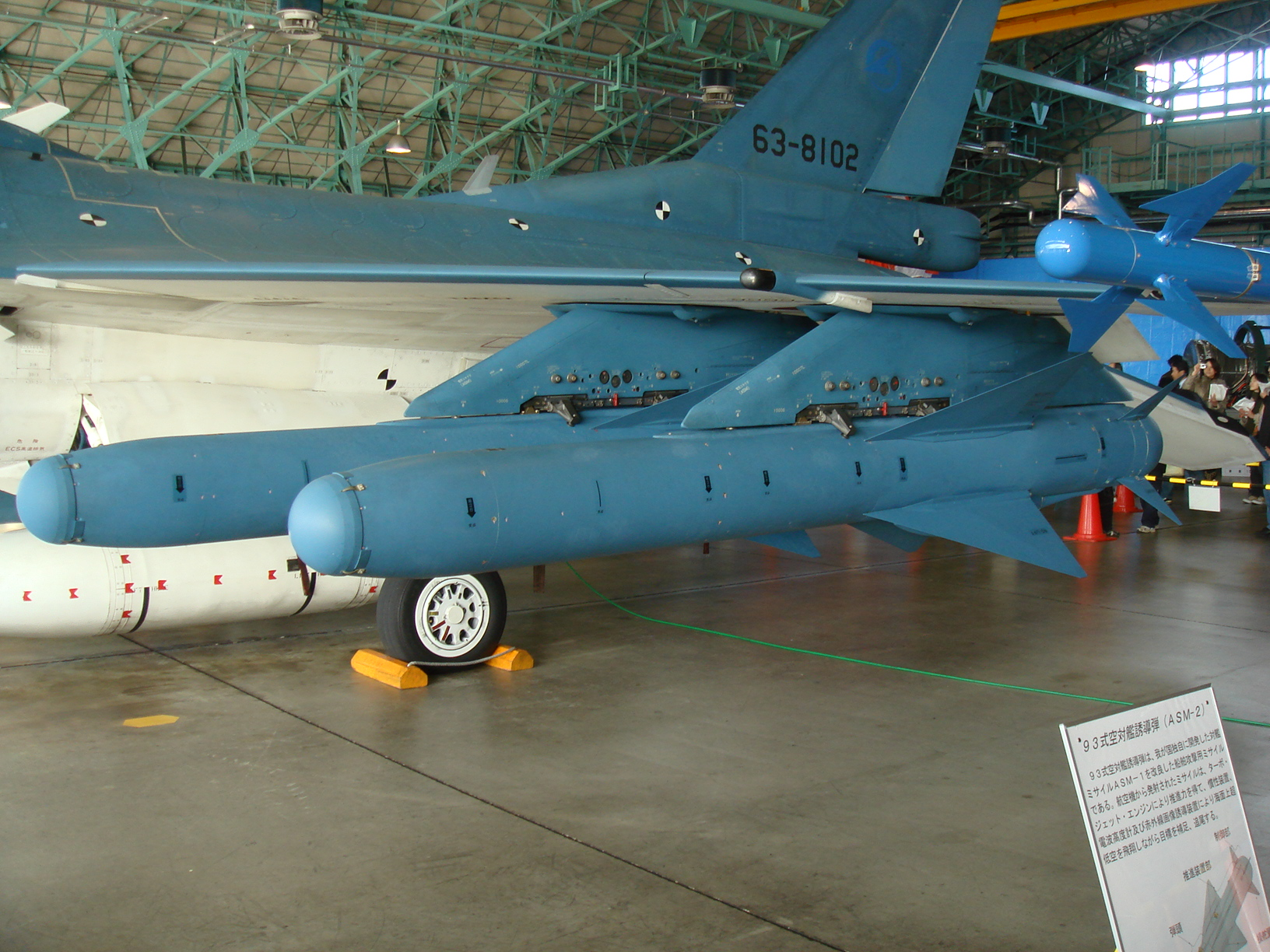
ASM-2 air-to-surface missile

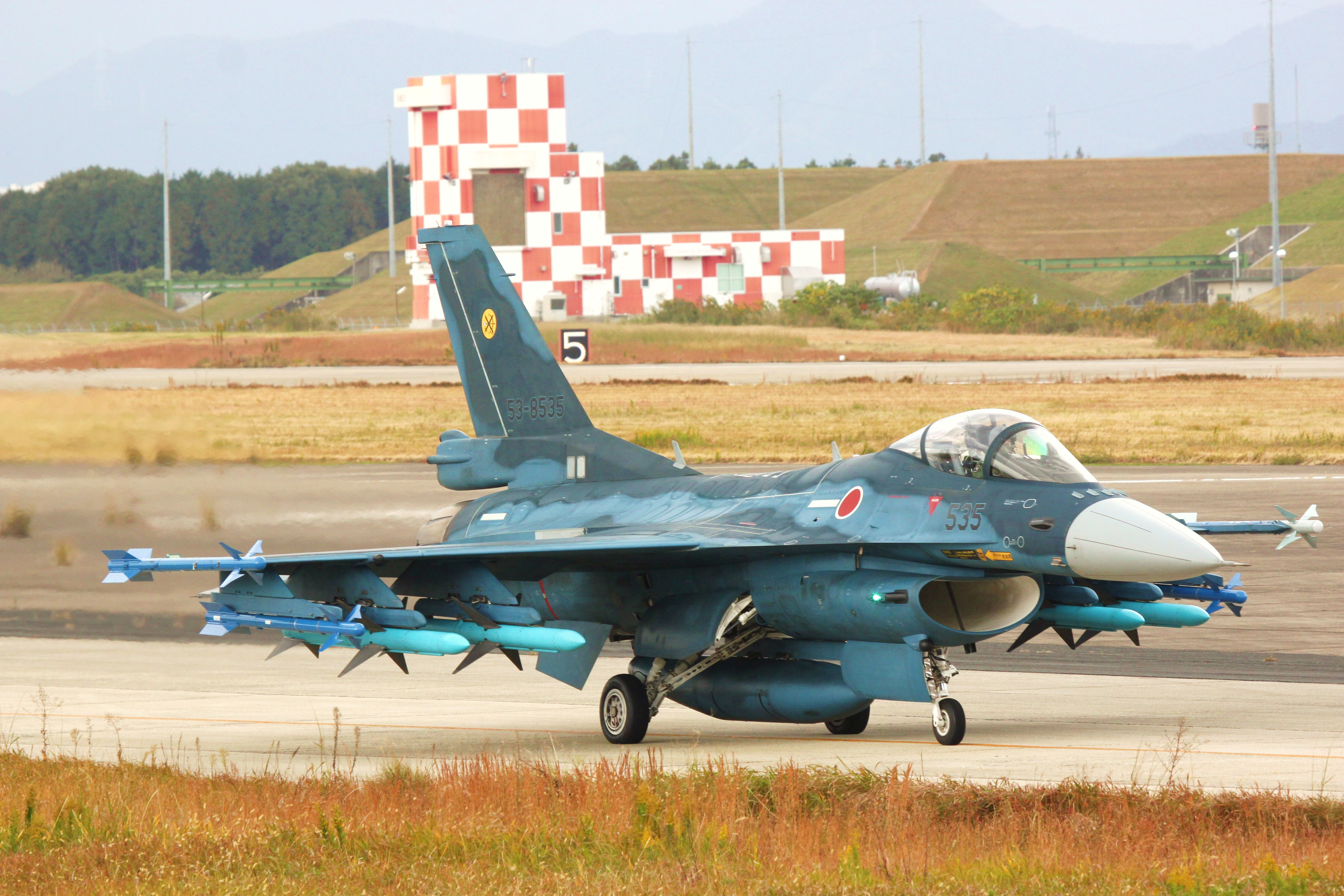
A JASDF F-2 loaded with AIM-7 Sparrow AAMs and AAM-3 SRAAMs.

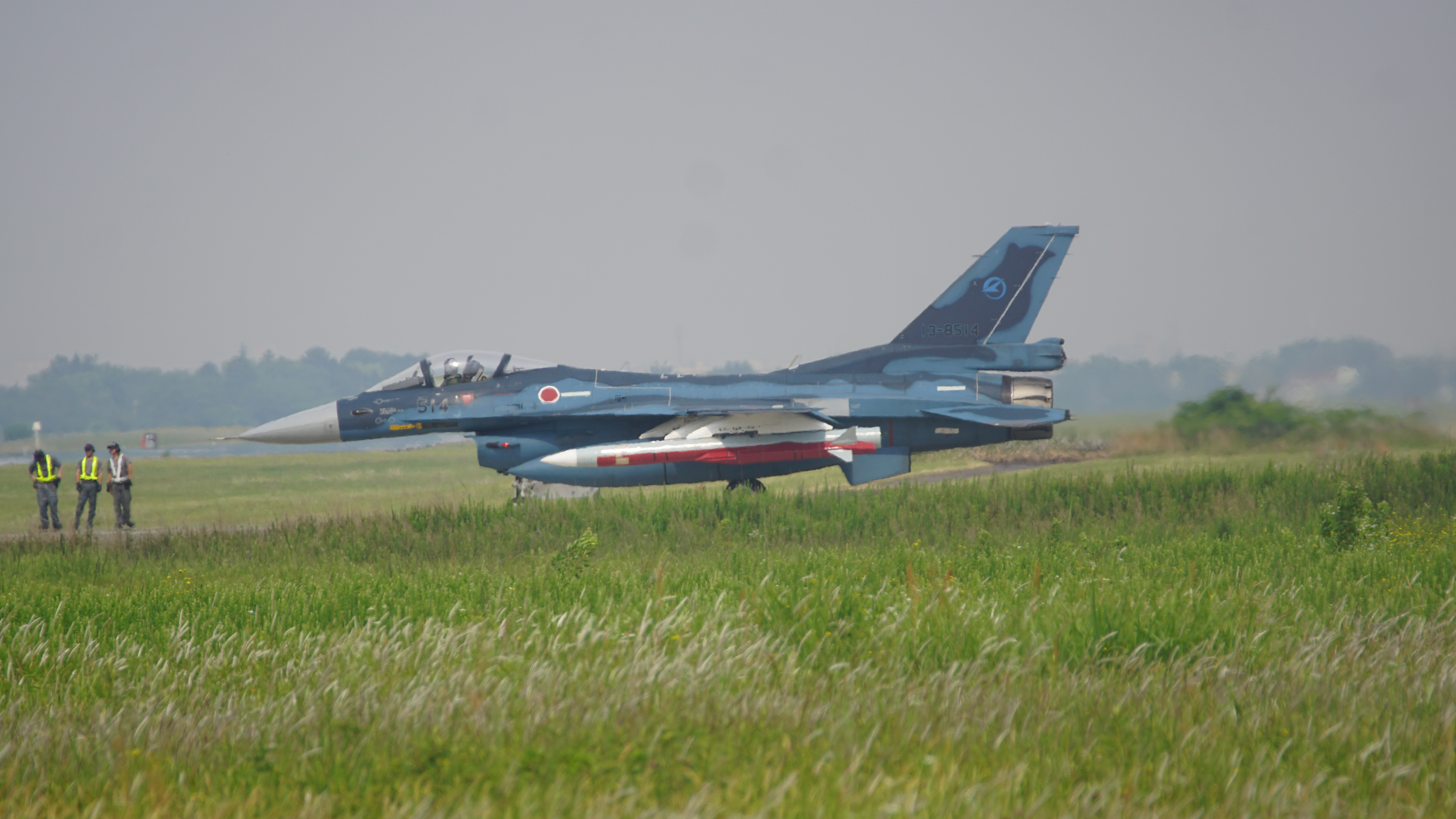
JASDF F-2 carries XASM-3 at Gifu air base May 2017.

Data from Jane's all the World's Aircraft 2010–11, Combat Aircraft since 1945

General characteristics

- Crew: 1 (F-2B: 2)
- Length: 15.52 m (50 ft 11 in)
- Wingspan: 11.125 m (36 ft 6 in) over missile launchers

10.8 m (35 ft) without missile launchers

- Wing area: 34.84 m^{2} (375.0 sq ft)
- Aspect ratio: 3.3
- Empty weight: 9,527 kg (21,003 lb)

F-2B: 9,633 kg (21,237 lb)

- Gross weight: 13,459 kg (29,672 lb) clean
- Max takeoff weight: 22,100 kg (48,722 lb)
- Maximum landing weight: 18,300 kg (40,300 lb)
- Fuel capacity: 4,637 L (1,225 US gal; 1,020 imp gal) maximum internal fuel 4,588 L (1,212 US gal; 1,009 imp gal) usable

F-2B 3,948 L (1,043 US gal; 868 imp gal) maximum internal fuel 3,903 L (1,031 US gal; 859 imp gal) usable

- External Fuel capacity: 5,678 L (1,500 US gal; 1,249 imp gal) maximum – (1x 1,135.5 L (300.0 US gal; 249.8 imp gal) + 2x 2,271.25 L (600.00 US gal; 499.61 imp gal) drop-tanks)
- Powerplant: 1 × General Electric F110-IHI-129 afterburning turbofan, 76 kN (17,000 lbf) thrust dry, 131 kN (29,500 lbf) with afterburner

Performance

- Maximum speed: 2,124 km/h (1,320 mph, 1,147 kn)
- Maximum speed: Mach 2.0 at high altitude, Mach 1.1 at low altitude
- Combat range: 833 km (518 mi, 450 nmi) +
- Service ceiling: 18,000 m (59,000 ft)
- Wing loading: 634.3 kg/m^{2} (129.9 lb/sq ft) maximum
- Thrust/weight: 0.994

Armament

- Guns: 1 × 20 mm (0.787 in) JM61A2 6-barrel rotary cannon
- Hardpoints: 2 × wing-tip air-to-air missile launch rails, 8 × under-wing, and 1 × under-fuselage pylon(s) with a capacity of 8,085 kg (17,824 lb) of ordnance
- Rockets:
  - 4 × JLAU-3/A rocket pods
- Missiles:
  - Air-to-air missiles:
    - 4 × Mitsubishi AAM-3
    - 4 × Mitsubishi AAM-4
    - 4 × Mitsubishi AAM-5
    - 4 × AIM-9L Sidewinder
    - 4 × AIM-7M Sparrow
  - Anti-ship missiles:
    - 4* × ASM-1
    - 4* × ASM-2
    - 4* × ASM-3
      - There are umbilicals and attachment points for ASMs on the inner most pylon, potentially bringing the total up to 6 for each of the ASMs, however this loadout is not used in service.
- Bombs:
  - Unguided Bombs:
    - 18 × Mk.82 bomb
    - 6 × Mk.84 bomb
    - 6 × CBU-87/B
  - Guided Bombs:
    - 18 × GCS-1 IIR guided bomb
    - 8 × 500lb JDAM/LJDAMs
    - 4 × 2000lb JDAMs
- Others:
  - J/AAQ-2 FLIR, later AN/AAQ-33 targeting pod

Avionics

- Mitsubishi Electric J/APG-2 AESA radar system
- Raytheon AN/ARC-164 Have Quick UHF transceiver
- NEC V/UHF transceiver
- Hitachi Kokusai Electric HF transceiver
- Tokyo Radio System/BAE AIFF
- Japan Aviation Electronics/Honeywell digital AFCS
- Japan Aviation Electronics ring laser IRS
- Toshiba VOR/ILS
- Rockwell Collins TACAN
- Mitsubishi Electric mission computer
- Mitsubishi MDS mission planning system
- Toshiba digital map display system
- Mitsubishi Electric integrated EW system

== See also ==
- Fighter units of the Japan Air Self-Defense Force

Related development

- General Dynamics F-16 Fighting Falcon
- AIDC F-CK-1 Ching-kuo
- KAI T-50 Golden Eagle

Aircraft of comparable role, configuration, and era

- Chengdu J-10
- Lockheed Martin F-16V Viper
- Saab JAS 39 Gripen

Related lists

- List of fighter aircraft
