= 21st Fighter Training Squadron (JASDF) =

21st Flight Training Squadron
- 第21飛行隊
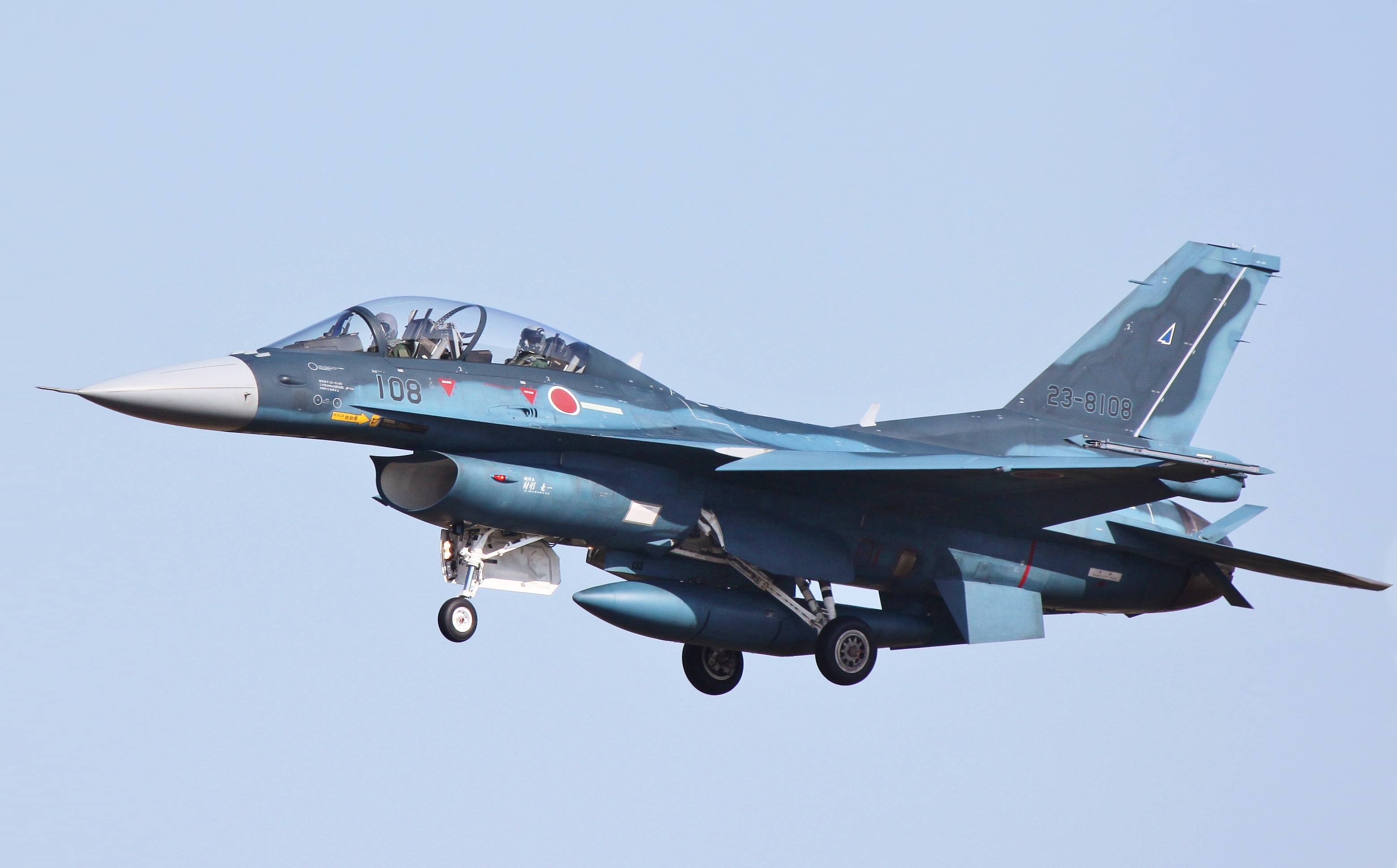
- Mitsubishi F-2B of 21st Squadron (2010)
- Active: March 31, 1975–present
- Country: Japan
- Allegiance: 4th Air Wing
- Branch: Japan Air Self-Defense Force
- Garrison/HQ: Matsushima Air Base

The 21st Fighter Training Squadron (第21飛行隊, Dainiichi Hikōtai) is a squadron of the 4th Air Wing of Air Training Command of the Japan Air Self-Defense Force. It is based at Matsushima Air Base in Miyagi Prefecture, Japan.

== History ==
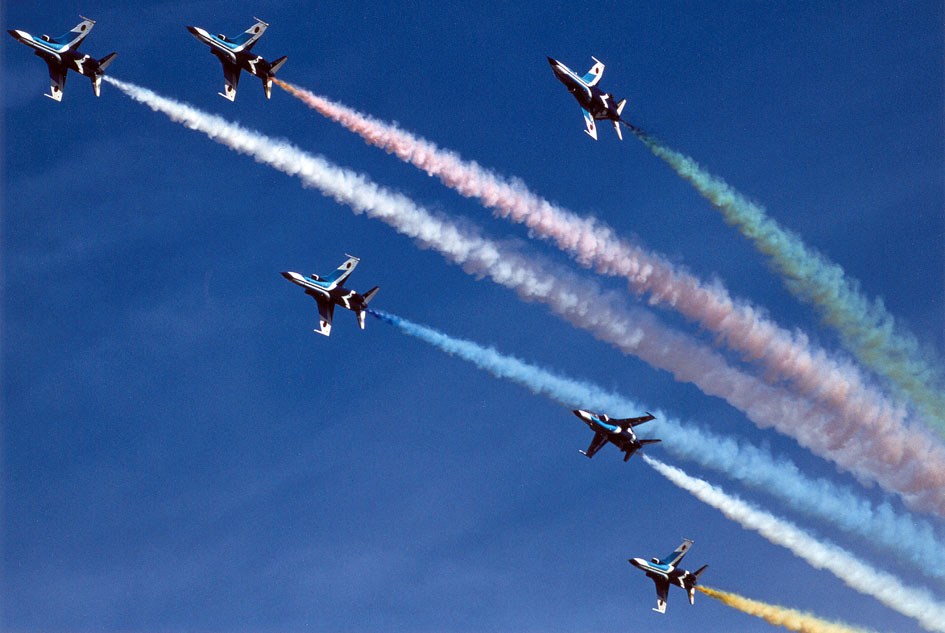
Mitsubishi T-2s of Blue Impulse in flight (1995)

The predecessor to the squadron was formed on March 31, 1975, and it formally became the 21st squadron on October 1, 1976.

After retiring their original North American F-86F Sabres, from January 12, 1982 to December 22, 1995 the JASDF aerobatics team Blue Impulse flew Mitsubishi T-2 aircraft as part of the squadron.

During the 2011 Tōhoku earthquake and tsunami, Matsushima Air Field was flooded with seawater, and eighteen Mitsubishi F-2B's belonging to 21st Squadron, as well as other aircraft, were damaged or destroyed.

In the aftermath of this event, the 21st was relocated to Misawa Air Base where it conducted a reduced schedule of training while both the airfield and its damaged aircraft were repaired. A ceremony marking the 21st's return to Matsushima was held on March 28, 2016.

== Tail marking ==
The squadron has a unique tail marking.

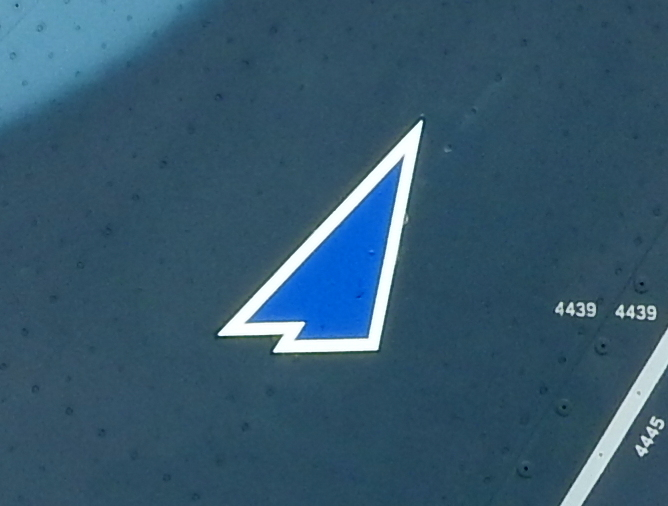
Tail marking (2016)

== Aircraft operated ==
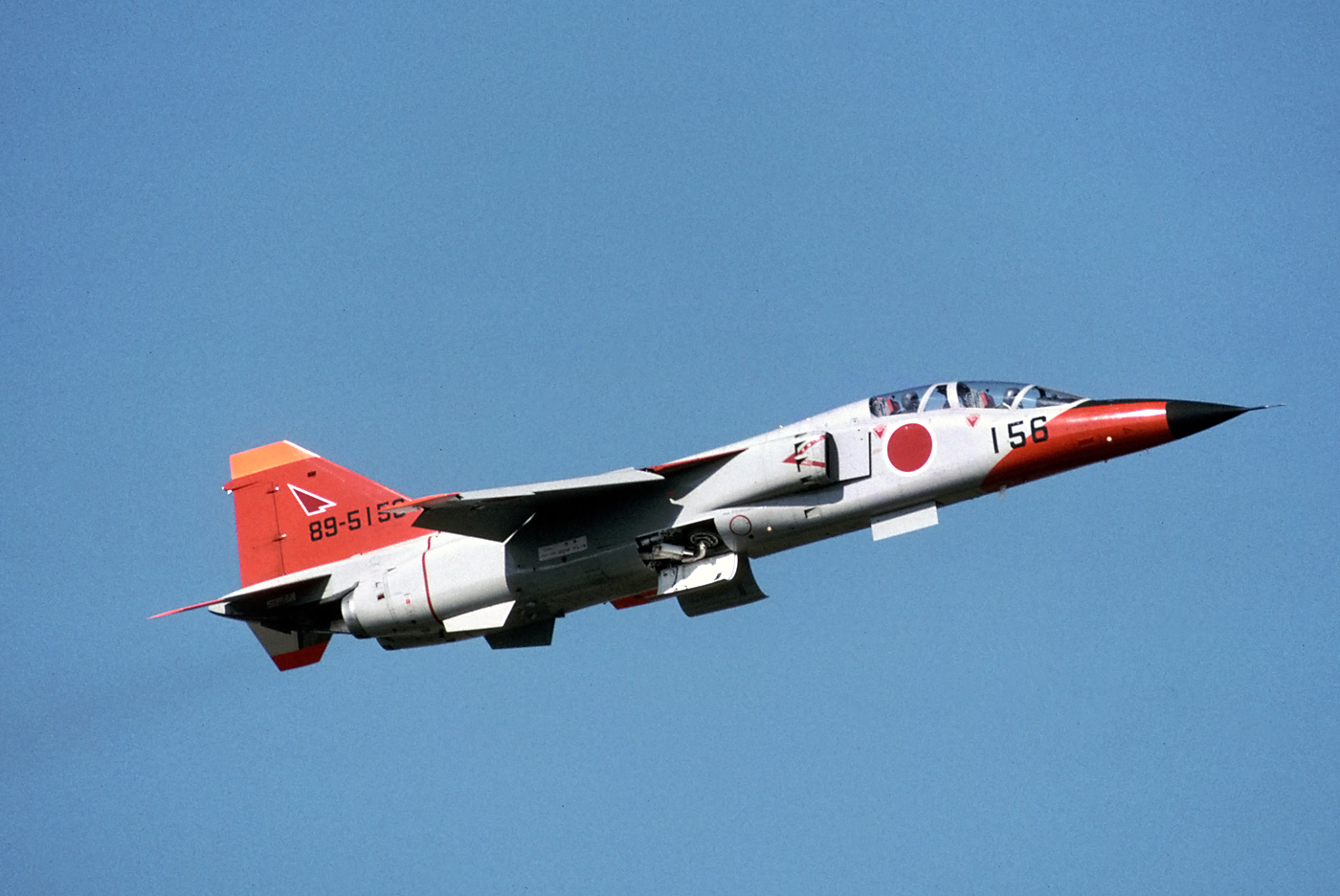
Mitsubishi T-2 (1994)

=== Trainer ===
- Mitsubishi T-2 (1976–2004)
- Mitsubishi F-2B (2002–present)

=== Liaison ===
- Lockheed T-33A (1976–1994)
- Kawasaki T-4 (1992–present)

== See also ==
- Blue Impulse
