= J/APG-1 =

Type of aircraft radar system

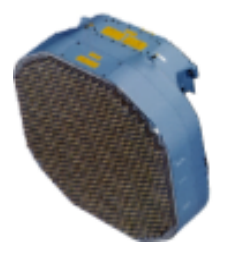
- Country of origin: Japan
- Type: Solid-state active electronically scanned array (AESA)
- Range: 60nmi/110km(RCS 5m2)
- Diameter: 700mm

The J/APG-1 is an active electronically scanned array (AESA) radar system designed and manufactured by Mitsubishi Electric for use on the Mitsubishi F-2 fighter aircraft starting in 2002. It was the first series production AESA to be introduced on a military aircraft in service. It is currently being upgraded to the J/APG-2 standard for compatibility with the new AAM-4B air-to-air missile.

== See also ==
- Phased array
- Active electronically scanned array
