= Matsushima Air Field =

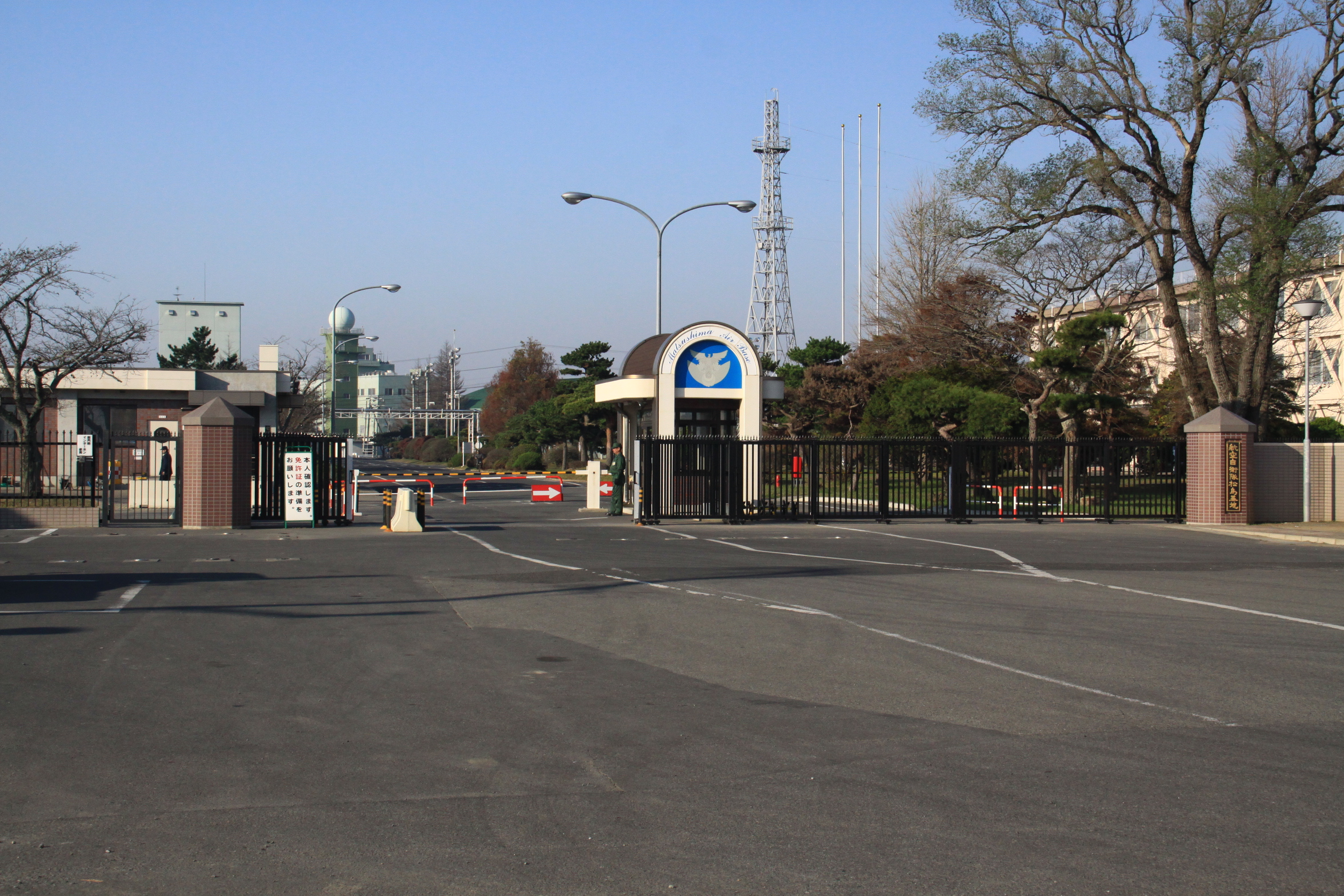
- IATA: none; ICAO: RJST

Summary
- Airport type: Military
- Operator: Japan Air Self-Defense Force
- Location: Higashimatsushima, Japan
- Elevation AMSL: 7 ft (2.1 m)
- Coordinates: 38°24′11″N 141°12′43″E

Map
- Location in Japan

Runways
Direction	Length		Surface
Direction	m	ft	Surface
07/25	2,700	8,858	Concrete
15/33	1,500	4,921	Concrete
- Source: Japanese AIP at AIS Japan

JASDF Matsushima Air Base (松島基地, Matsushima Kichi) (ICAO: RJST) is a military aerodrome of the Japan Air Self-Defense Force located in Higashimatsushima, 6.6 NM (12.2 km; 7.6 mi) west of Ishinomaki in the Miyagi Prefecture, Japan. Headquarters for the 4th Air Wing (JASDF), the base is primarily used for training, and is the home of the JASDF 21st Fighter Training Squadron, currently equipped with Mitsubishi F-2B fighters. It is also the home base for the "Blue Impulse" JASDF acrobatic display team.

== History ==
The base was established on 7 June 1937 as a base for the Imperial Japanese Navy Air Service during the Second Sino-Japanese War. The Matsushima Naval Air Group was a shore-based unit equipped with Mitsubishi G3M and Mitsubishi G4M bombers and participated in the Battle of Okinawa during World War II. The base was bombed five times during the ending stages of the war, on 14 July, 15 July, 17 July, 9 August and 10 August 1945.

In the early post-war era, the American occupation forces started to revive the Japanese military with the creation of the National Safety Forces. In 1954, "Camp Matsushima" was renamed "Matsushima Air Field" and training operations for the fledgling Japan Air Self-Defense Force began using North American T-6 Texan trainers.

In 1971 an F-86F Sabre on a training mission from this base collided with All Nippon Airways Flight 58, causing 162 deaths.

During the 2011 Tōhoku earthquake and tsunami, the base was flooded with seawater, and eighteen Mitsubishi F-2Bs belonging to 21st Squadron, as well as other aircraft, were damaged or destroyed.

== Units ==
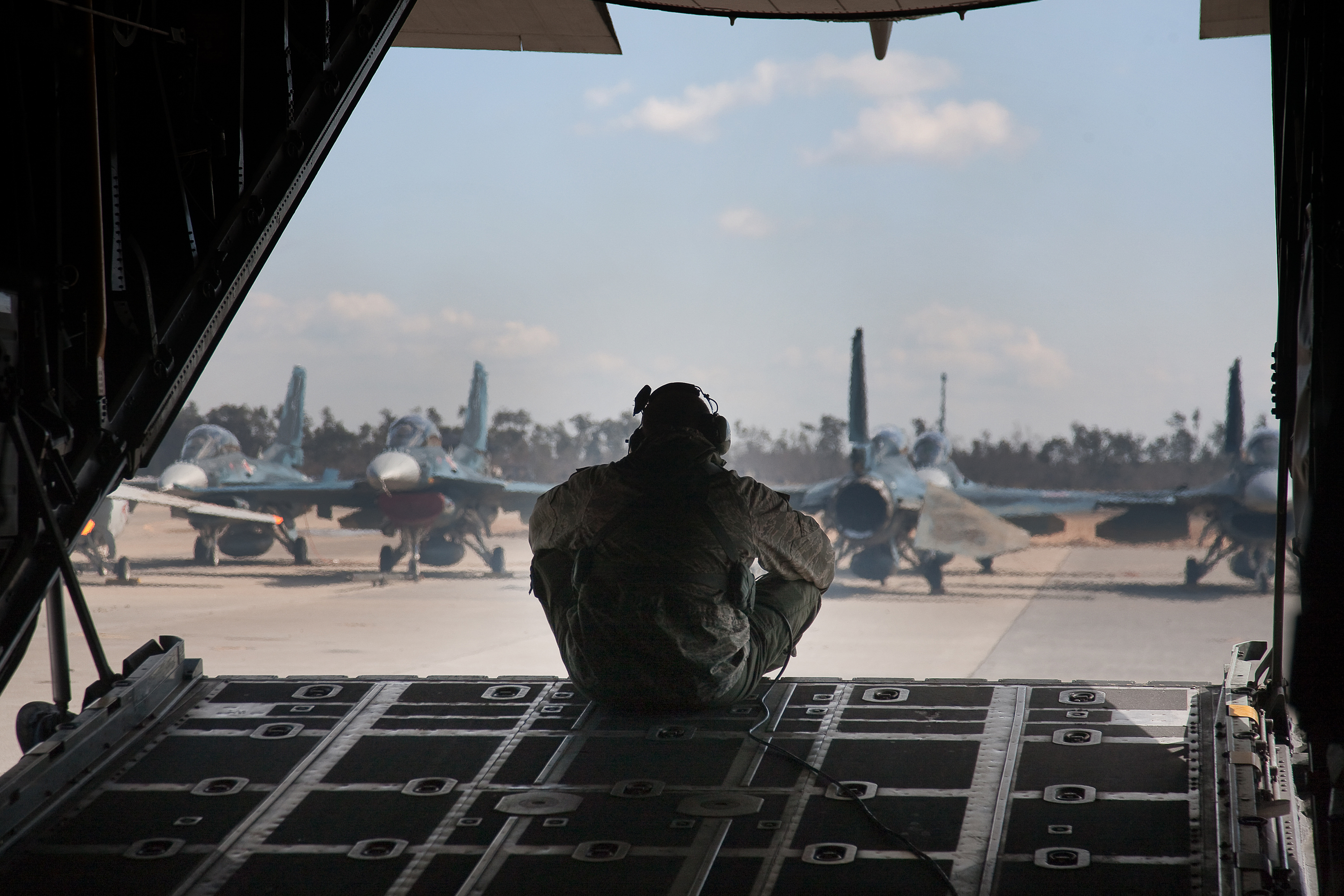
Senior Airman Ramon Mortensen looks at damaged F-2B aircraft after landing 2011 Tōhoku earthquake and tsunami

- Air Training Command
  - 4th Air Wing
    - 21st Fighter Training Squadron (F-2B)
    - 11th Squadron, Blue Impulse (Kawasaki T-4)
- Air Rescue Wing Matsushima Detachment (JASDF) (UH-60J), (U-125A)
