= 6th Tactical Fighter Squadron (JASDF) =

- 第6飛行隊
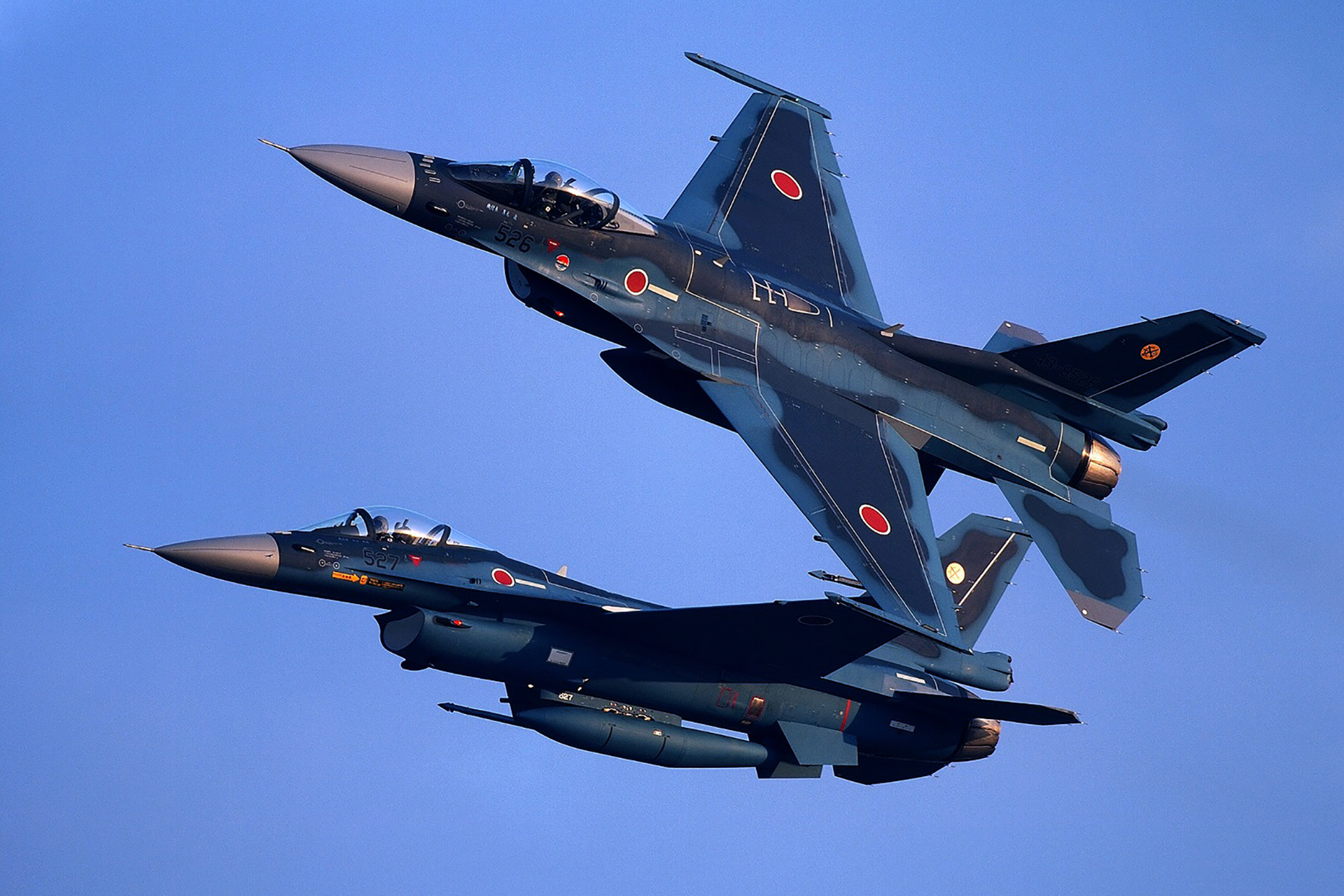
- 6 Sqn Mitsubishi F-2As
- Active: August 1, 1958 – present
- Country: Japan
- Branch: Japan Air Self-Defense Force
- Part of: Western Air Defense Force, 8th Air Wing
- Garrison/HQ: Tsuiki Air Base

Aircraft flown
- Fighter: Mitsubishi F-2
- Trainer: Kawasaki T-4

The 6th Tactical Fighter Squadron (第6飛行隊 (dai-roku-hikoutai)) is a squadron of the 8th Air Wing of the Japan Air Self-Defense Force based at Tsuiki Air Base, in Fukuoka Prefecture, Japan. It is equipped with Mitsubishi F-2 and Kawasaki T-4 aircraft.

== History ==
In September 2017 it conducted training with US Air Force Rockwell B-1B Lancer bombers.

== Tail markings ==
Since the F-1 period the squadron's tail markings have been a sword with a bow and arrow.

== Aircraft operated ==
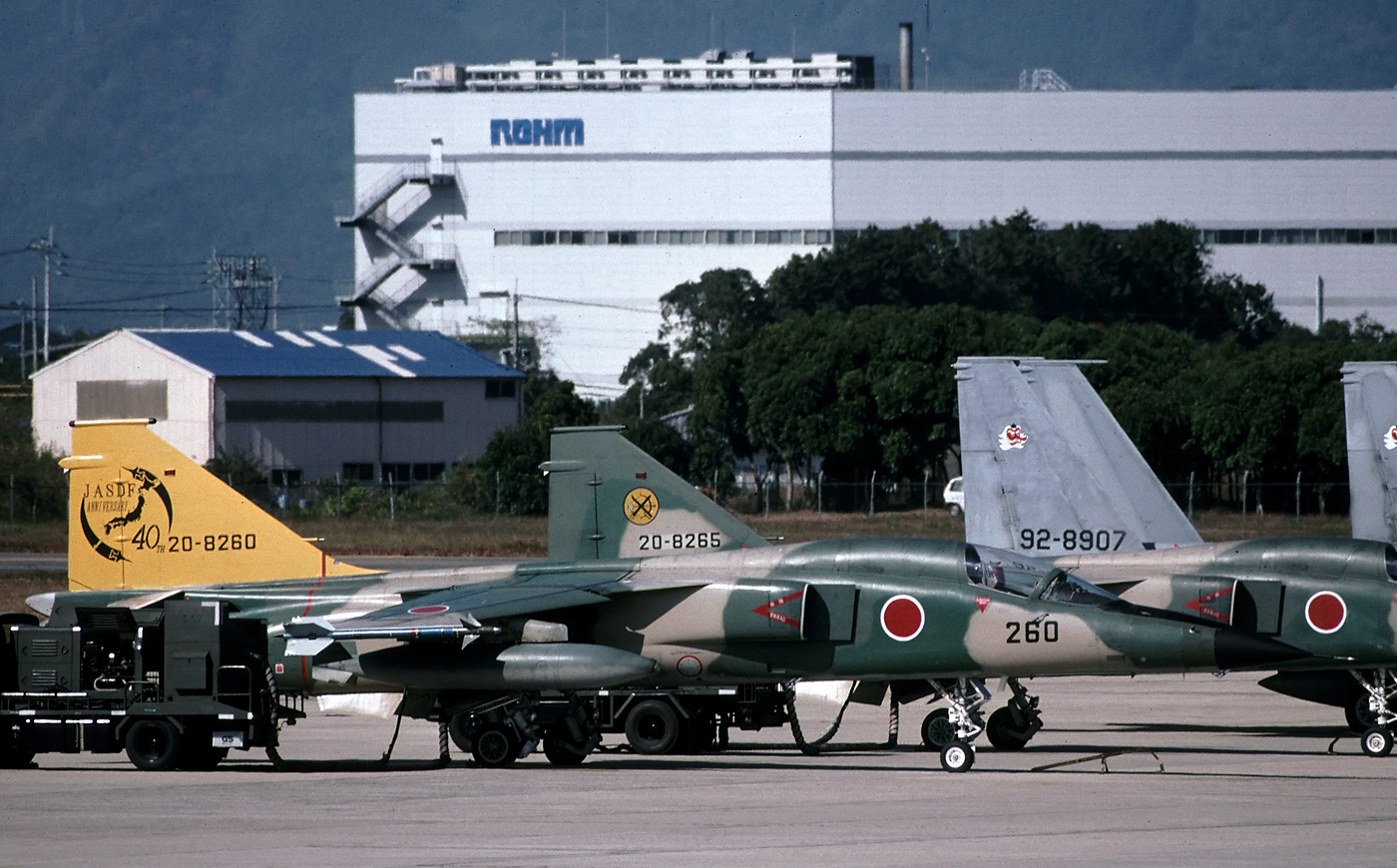
Mitsubishi F-1 (1994)

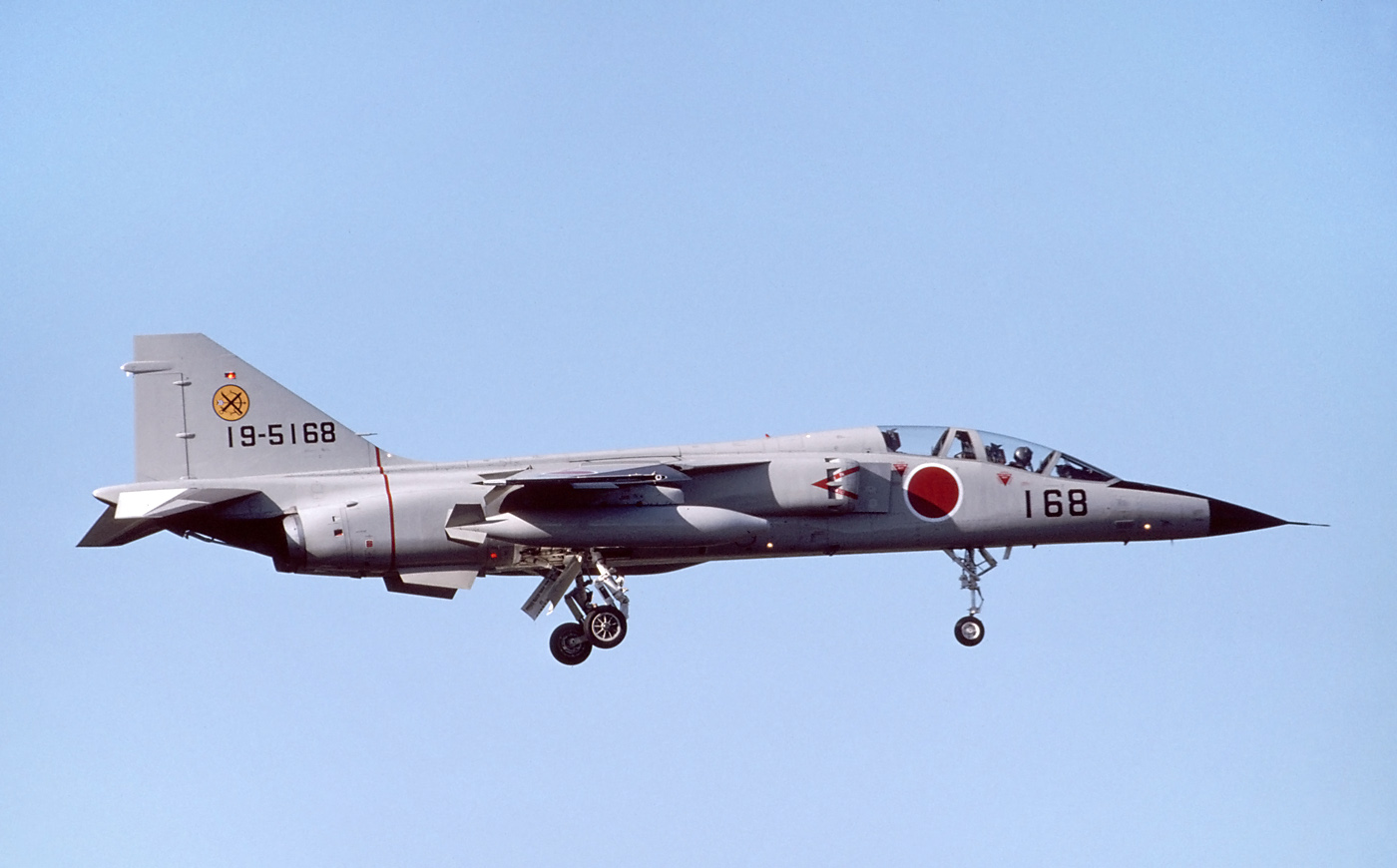
Mitsubishi T-2 (1994)

=== Fighter aircraft ===
- North American F-86F Sabre (1959–1981)
- Mitsubishi F-1 (1981–2006)
- Mitsubishi F-2 (2004–present)

=== Liaison aircraft ===
- Lockheed T-33A (1959–1992)
- Mitsubishi T-2 (1981–2006)
- Kawasaki T-4 (1991–present)

== See also ==
- Fighter units of the Japan Air Self-Defense Force
