= 8th Tactical Fighter Squadron (JASDF) =

- 第8飛行隊
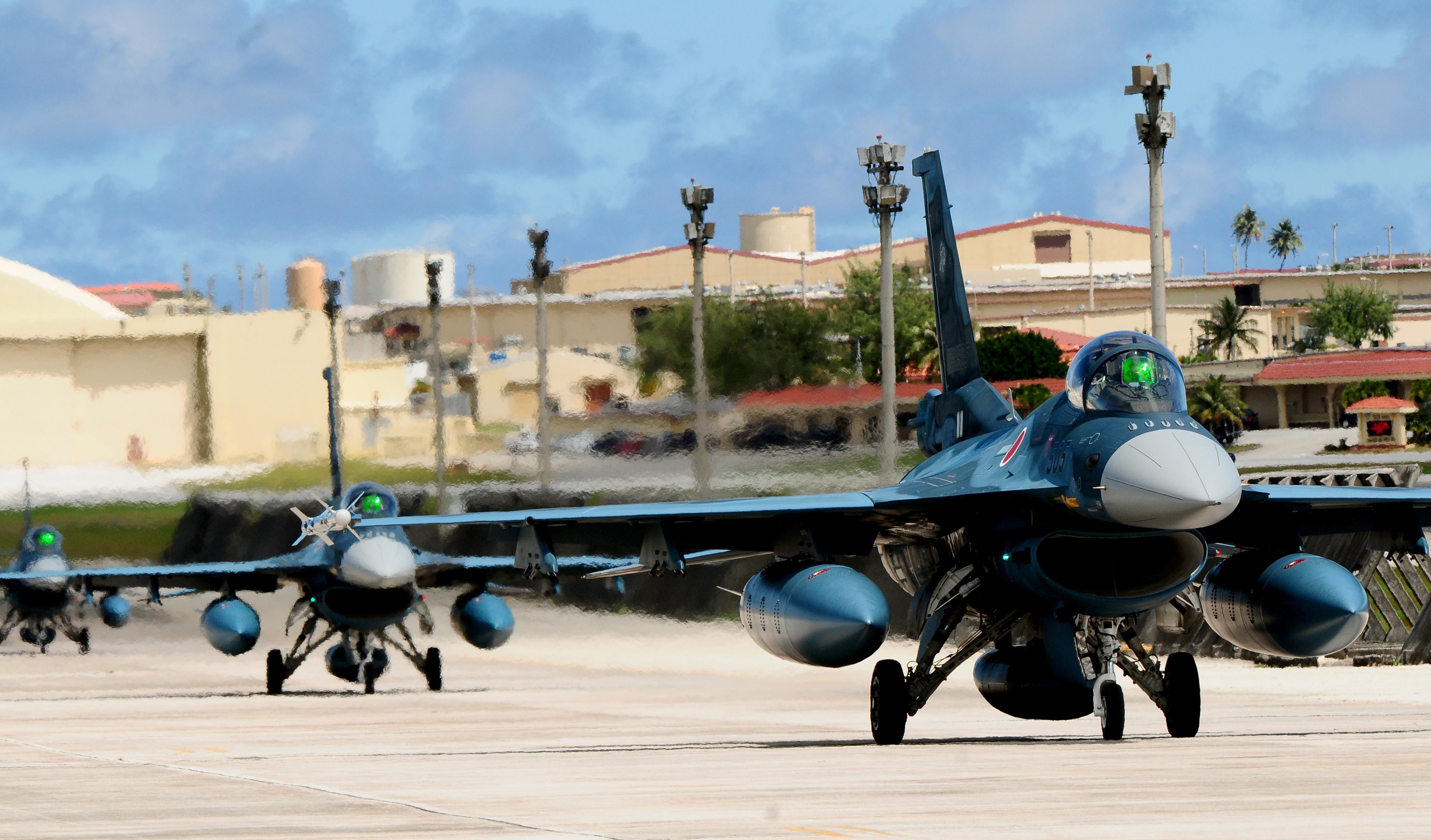
- 8 Sqn Mitsubishi F-2As (2011)
- Active: October 29, 1960 – present
- Country: Japan
- Branch: Japan Air Self-Defense Force
- Part of: Western Air Defense Force, 8th Air Wing
- Garrison/HQ: Tsuiki Air Base

Aircraft flown
- Fighter: Mitsubishi F-2
- Trainer: Kawasaki T-4

The 8th Tactical Fighter Squadron (第8飛行隊 (dai-hachi-hikoutai)) is a squadron of the 8th Air Wing of the Japan Air Self-Defense Force based at Tsuiki Air Base, in Fukuoka Prefecture, Japan. It is equipped with Mitsubishi F-2 and Kawasaki T-4 aircraft.

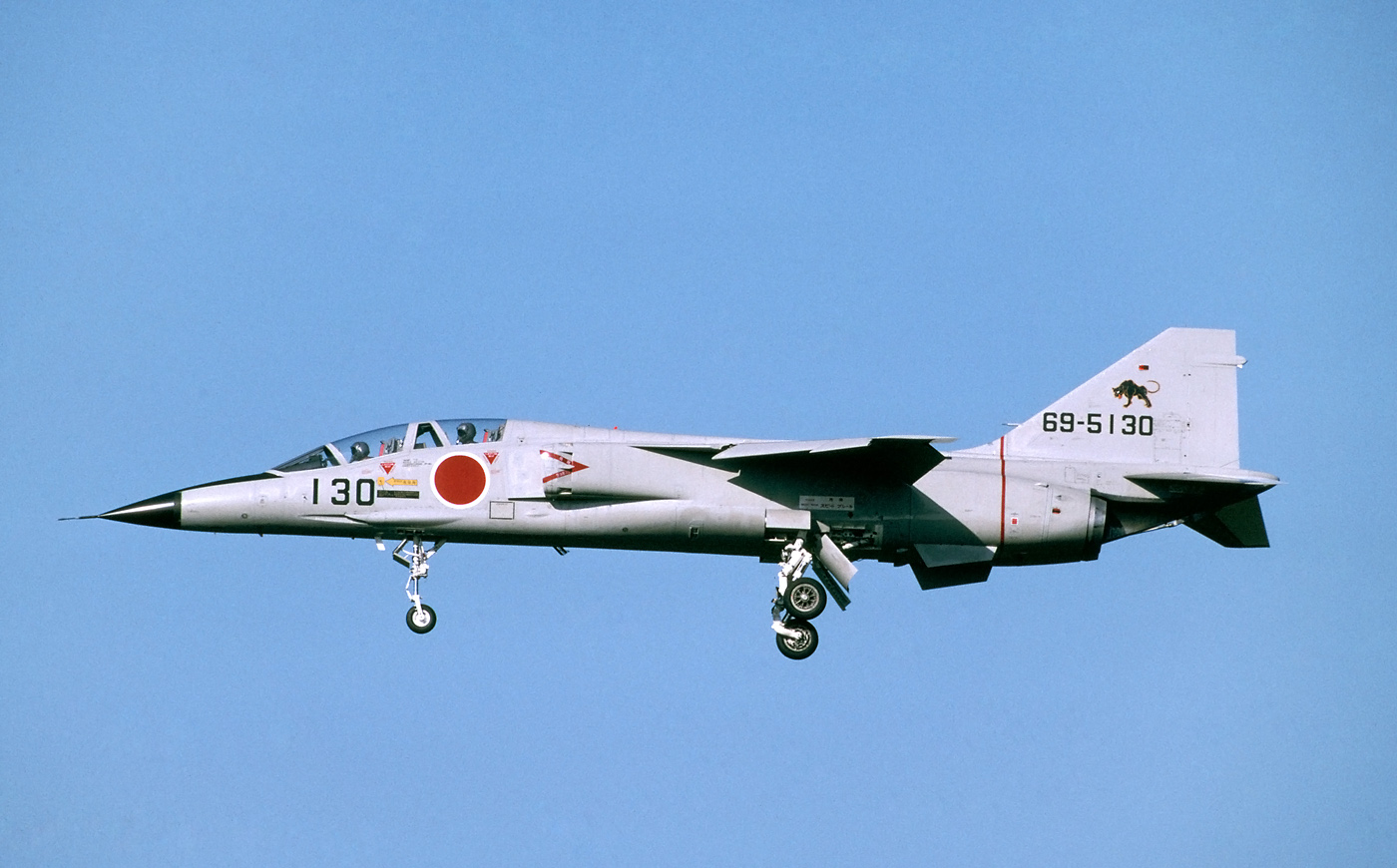
Mitsubishi T-2 (1994)

== Tail markings ==
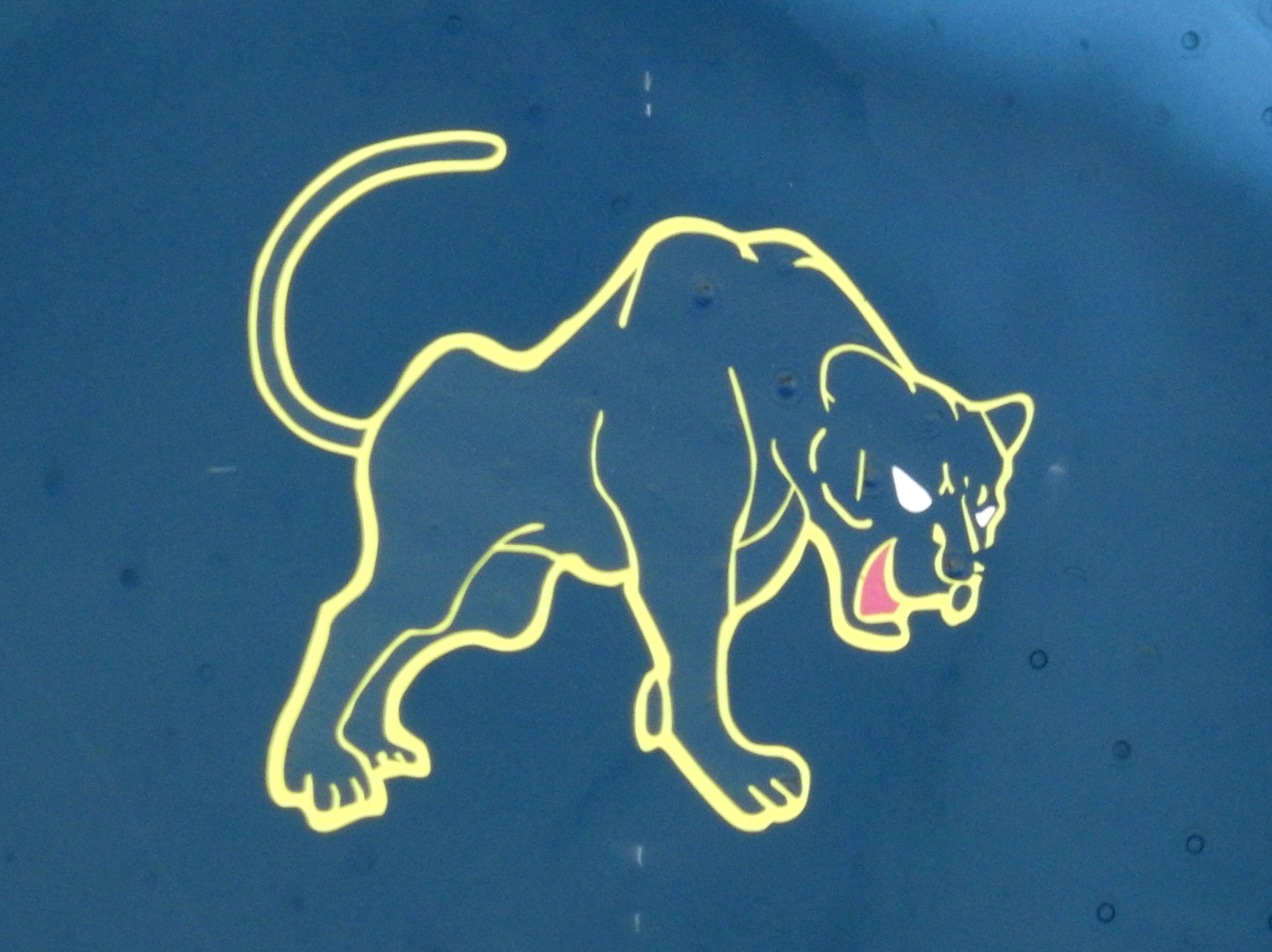
Tail marking (2017)

The squadron's tail marking is of a black leopard.

== In popular culture ==
The squadron appeared in the 1993 anime film Patlabor 2: The Movie and in the 2016 film Shin Godzilla.

== Aircraft operated ==
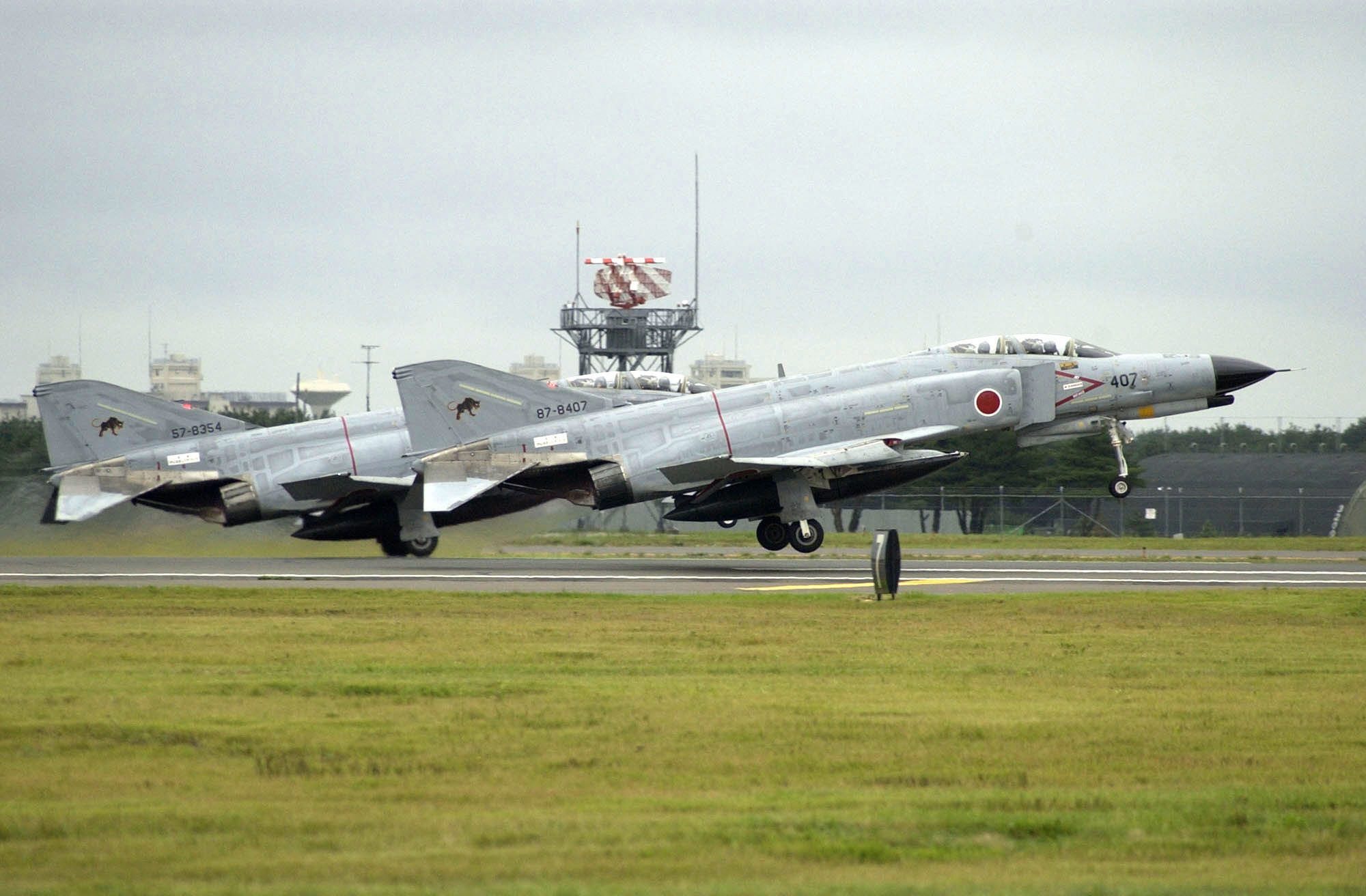
McDonnell Douglas F-4EJ Phantom II Kais (2002)

=== Fighter aircraft ===
- North American F-86F Sabre (1960–1980)
- Mitsubishi F-1 (1980–1997)
- McDonnell Douglas F-4EJ Kai (1997–2009)
- Mitsubishi F-2 (2008–present)

=== Liaison aircraft ===
- Lockheed T-33A (1959–1992)
- Mitsubishi T-2 (1981–2006)
- Kawasaki T-4 (1991–present)

== See also ==
- Fighter units of the Japan Air Self-Defense Force
