= All Nippon Airways Flight 58 =

1971 mid-air collision over Japan

All Nippon Airways Flight 58 JASDF 92-7932
Accident
- Date: 30 July 1971
- Summary: Mid-air collision
- Site: Near Shizukuishi, Iwate Prefecture, Japan; 39°41′N 140°59′E
- Total fatalities: 162
- Total injuries: 2
- Total survivors: 1

First aircraft
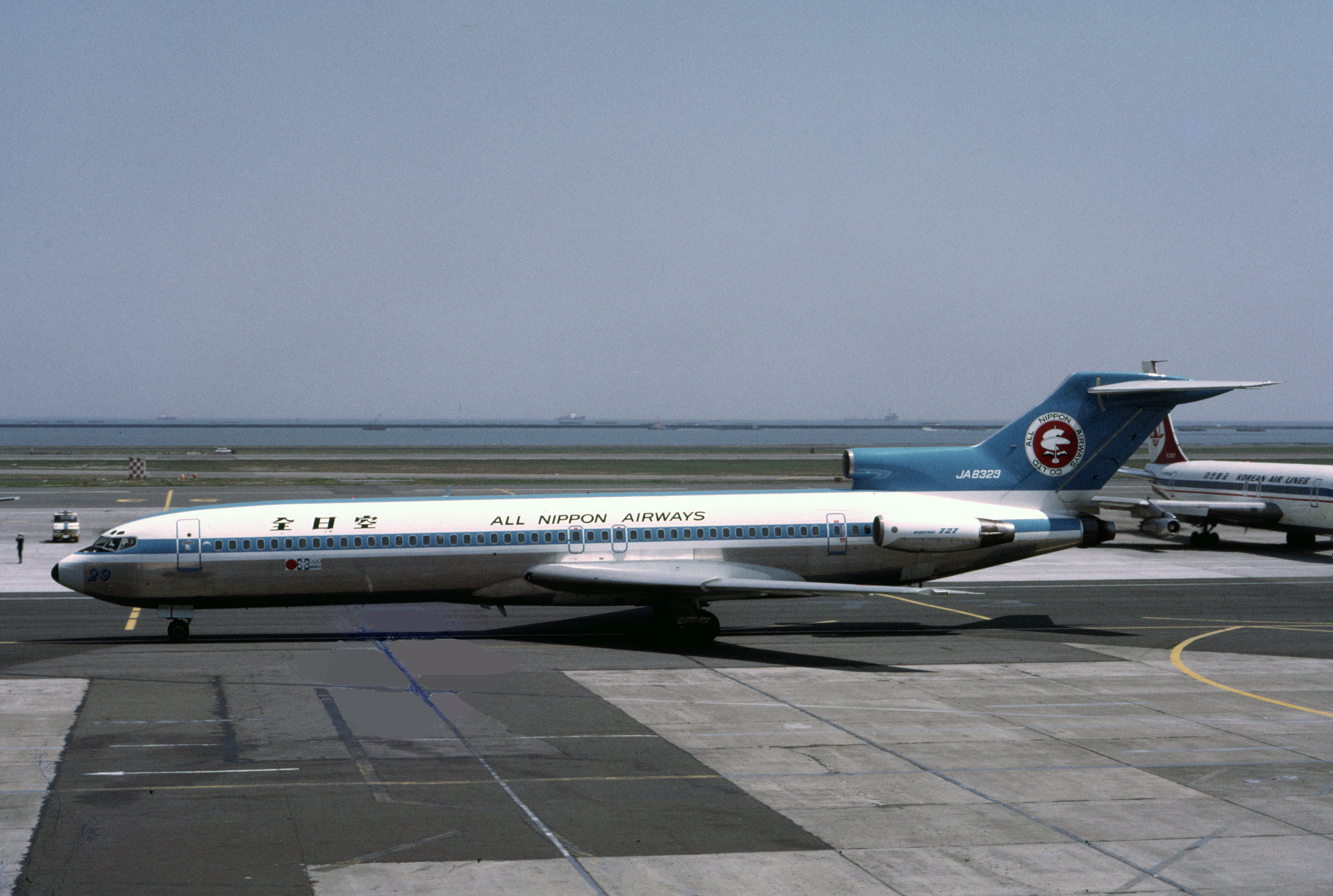
- JA8329, the Boeing 727 involved in the accident, pictured here two months before the collision
- Type: Boeing 727-281 (Note: The aircraft was a Boeing 727-200 model; Boeing assigns a unique code for each company that buys one of its aircraft, which is applied as an infix to the model number at the time the aircraft is built, hence "727-281" designates a 727-200 built for All Nippon Airways (ANA), which has 81 as its customer code.)
- Operator: All Nippon Airways
- IATA flight No.: NH58
- ICAO flight No.: ANA58
- Call sign: ALL NIPPON 58
- Registration: JA8329
- Flight origin: Chitose Air Base, Sapporo
- Destination: Haneda Airport, Tokyo
- Occupants: 162
- Passengers: 155
- Crew: 7
- Fatalities: 162
- Survivors: 0

Second aircraft
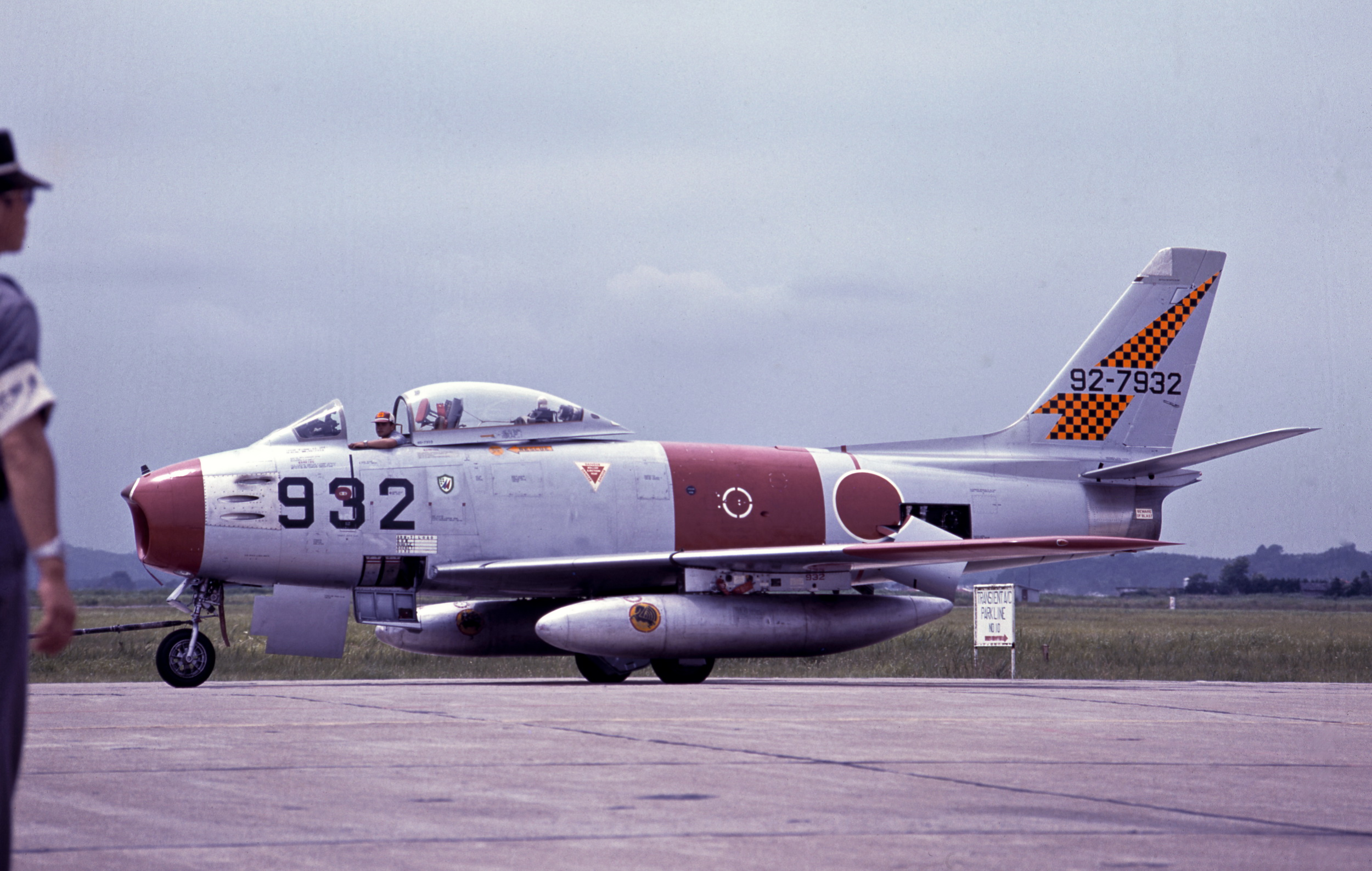
- 92-7932, the F-86 Sabre involved in the accident, seen here five days before the collision
- Type: Mitsubishi F-86F Sabre
- Operator: JASDF
- Call sign: LILAC CHARLIE 2
- Registration: 92-7932
- Flight origin: Matsushima Air Field
- Destination: Matsushima Air Field
- Occupants: 1
- Passengers: 0
- Crew: 1
- Fatalities: 0
- Injuries: 1
- Survivors: 1

Ground casualties
- Ground injuries: 1

All Nippon Airways (ANA) Flight 58 was a Japanese domestic flight from Chitose Airport to Haneda Airport, operated by All Nippon Airways (ANA). On 30 July 1971, at 02:04 local time, a Japan Air Self-Defense Force (JASDF) F-86F Sabre jet fighter collided with the Boeing 727 airliner operating the flight, causing both aircraft to crash. All 162 people aboard the airliner were killed, while the Sabre pilot, a trainee with the JASDF, freed himself from his airplane after the collision and parachuted to safety. This incident led to the resignation of both the head of Japan's Defense Agency and the JASDF chief of staff.

== Aircraft ==
The ANA airliner was a Boeing 727-281 with registration JA8329; it was three months old at the time of the accident. The JASDF aircraft, belonging to the 1st Air Wing at Matsushima Airbase, was a Mitsubishi F-86F Sabre, a Japanese-built version of North American Aviation's fighter jet, with tail number 92-7932. At the time of the accident, the F-86F was one of the primary aircraft in the JASDF's inventory.

== Passengers and crew ==
Most of the airline passengers came from Fuji in Shizuoka Prefecture and were returning from a trip to Hokkaido. Of the passengers, 125 were in a tour group made up of members of a society for relatives of Japanese servicemen killed in World War II. The captain of Flight 58, Saburo Kawanishi, 41, had more than 8,000 hours of flying experience, including 242 hours on the Boeing 727. He transmitted a brief emergency call between the time of the collision and the aircraft's disintegration. The first officer was 27-year-old Tsuji Kazuhiko, who had more than 2,200 hours of flight experience, 624 of them on the Boeing 727. The flight engineer was 30-year-old Donald M. Carpenter, an American who had logged nearly 2,500 flight hours with 206 of them on the Boeing 727.

== Sequence of events ==
ANA Flight 58 departed Chitose Airport near Sapporo, with 155 passengers and a crew of 7 on board for a domestic flight to Tokyo's Haneda International Airport. After takeoff, the aircraft climbed to its cruising altitude of about 28,000 feet (8,500 m). Meanwhile, JASDF Technical Sergeant Yoshimi Ichikawa, a 22-year-old trainee pilot, and Captain Tamotsu Kuma, his 31-year-old instructor, were practicing air combat manoeuvring in their two Sabres near Morioka, northern Honshu. The trainee, unaware of the ANA aircraft, was told by his instructor to break away from Flight 58 as it approached and banked left to avoid it, but was already too late and moments later, the leading edge of the Sabre's right wing struck the Boeing's left tailplane at an altitude of 26,000 feet (7,900 m). The damage to the Boeing's tail caused it to go out of control; it entered a steep dive and disintegrated in mid-air, the wreckage impacting near the town of Shizukuishi in Iwate Prefecture. Part of the wreckage struck a house, injuring a woman inside.

All 162 passengers and crew were killed. The Sabre, having lost its right wing, entered a spin that prevented the trainee pilot from ejecting, so he unbuckled his safety belts and freed himself from the aircraft. He deployed his parachute and landed safely. The Sabre plunged into a nearby rice paddy.

== Aftermath ==
The JASDF pilots were later tried and the trainee was acquitted on a charge of involuntary manslaughter. However, the instructor was found guilty of criminally negligent manslaughter and sentenced to three years in prison, with a three-year suspension. He also lost his job. Keikichi Masuhara, Director-General of the Defense Agency (now Ministry of Defense) and General Yasuhiro Ueda, Chief of the Air Staff, resigned afterward, taking responsibility for the incident.

The loss of Flight 58 was the deadliest aviation disaster in history at the time, surpassing the 1968 Kham Duc C-130 shootdown and the 1969 crash of Viasa Flight 742 in Venezuela. The fatality toll was later surpassed by Aeroflot Flight 217 in 1972, which killed 174.

== See also ==
- 1983 Rhein-Main Starfighter crash
- Gol Transportes Aéreos Flight 1907
- Hughes Airwest Flight 706
- 2025 Potomac River mid-air collision
