= Mitsubishi T-2 =

Japanese supersonic jet trainer aircraft

T-2
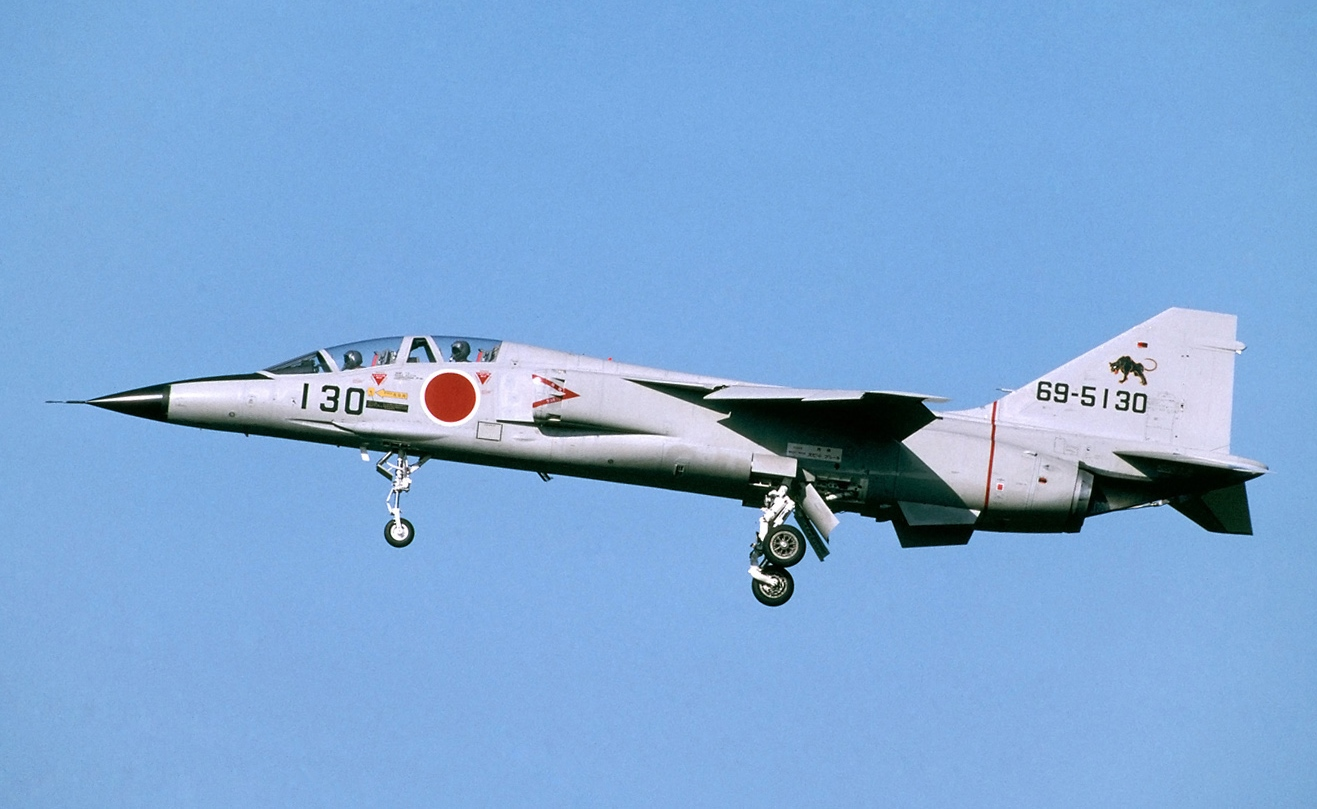
- Mitsubishi T-2 at MCAS Iwakuni

General information
- Type: Trainer
- National origin: Japan
- Manufacturer: Mitsubishi
- Primary user: Japan Air Self-Defense Force
- Number built: 96

History
- Manufactured: 1971–1988
- Introduction date: 1975
- First flight: 20 July 1971
- Retired: March 2006
- Developed into: Mitsubishi F-1

The Mitsubishi T-2 was a supersonic jet trainer aircraft designed and produced by the Japanese aerospace firm Mitsubishi. It was the first Japanese-developed aircraft to break the sound barrier.

During the 1960s, it became apparent that the Fuji T-1, Japan's first quantity-production jet aircraft, was not ideal for training pilots to operate the increasingly complex supersonic aircraft being operated by the Japan Air Self-Defense Force (JASDF). Accordingly, options for a new trainer that could also be potentially developed into a strike fighter were explored under the T-X initiative. Both the Northrop T-38 Talon and SEPECAT Jaguar were examined to fulfil this role, with negotiations for held with the Anglo/French consortium SEPECAT on licence-producing the Jaguar reportedly conducted, but Japan instead opted for its own design. Mitsubishi's proposal was selected in September 1967. While independently designed, the T-2 bore a resemblance to the Jaguar, and both aircraft were powered by licence-produced versions of the same Rolls-Royce Turbomeca Adour turbofan engines, yet there was clear differences between the two as well.

On 20 July 1971, the first XT-2 prototype performed its maiden flight. Four years later, the type was introduced by the JASDF in the advanced trainer role, by which point it had been formally designated T-2. The aircraft was adopted by the "Blue Impulse" aerobatic display team during the early 1980s as well as by a dedicated aggressor squadron. Furthermore, the envisioned strike derivative of the T-2, which had been tentatively designated SF-X, also entered service as the Mitsubishi F-1 strike fighter, to which the T-2 functioned as a conversion trainer. Deliveries of the T-2 continued until 1988; the JASDF was its sole operator. The last T-2s were withdrawn by 2006, by which point it had been replaced by the newer Kawasaki T-4.

== Development ==
In the aftermath of the surrender that ended the Second World War, numerous restrictions were imposed upon Japan, which included a ban on the Japanese aircraft industry conducting research as well as the manufacture of materials and equipment related to aircraft. Consequently, this rendered the country without a modern domestically-developed fighter aircraft for defensive purposes. Two decades after the conflict had concluded, the Japanese Air Self-Defense Force (JASDF) began to consider the domestic development of its own supersonic aircraft.

During the 1960s, it had become apparent to Japanese officials that the Fuji T-1, a subsonic trainer that was Japan's first quantity production jet aircraft, was not adequately preparing trainee pilots for the operation of more complex and difficult handling front line Mach 2 fighters, such as the Lockheed F-104J Starfighter and McDonnell Douglas F-4EJ Phantom. Accordingly, during the mid-1960s, planners began studies for a new trainer, tentatively designated T-X, which it was hoped would also form the basis for a future single-seat attack aircraft, initially referred to as the SF-X.

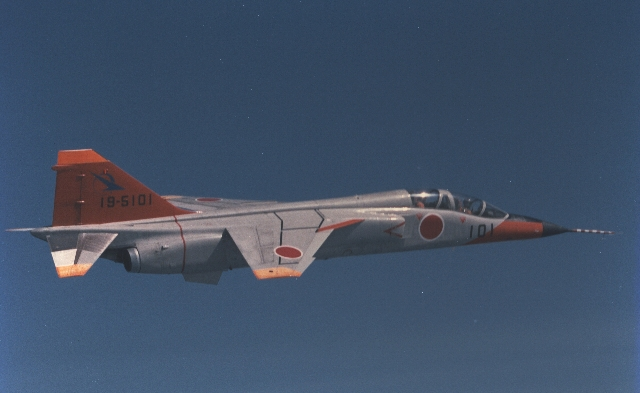
XT-2 prototype in flight, December 1971

The option of developing a new aircraft was not a foregone conclusion as consideration was given to the acquisition of existing aircraft that had been designed overseas. One candidate was the American Northrop T-38 Talon while another was the SEPECAT Jaguar, offered by the Anglo/French consortium SEPECAT to perform both the trainer and single-seat fighter missions. Japan considered both aircraft carefully, and was at one point reportedly holding negotiations towards the licensed production of the Jaguar. However, these plans were ultimately fruitless; the reasons for the failure have been speculated to have been due to nationalism and allegedly high royalty payments demanded by SEPECAT. Instead, Japan decided to manufacture its own design, which, produced to meet similar requirements, would closely resemble the Jaguar.

During 1967, the Japanese aviation firms Fuji, Kawasaki, and Mitsubishi, each submitted their own proposals. In September 1967, under lead designer Dr. Kenji Ikeda, Mitsubishi's design was selected. The official contract was issued for the development of the XT-2 was placed on 30 March 1968, with Mitsubishi as the prime contractor and Fuji as the Prime subcontractor. Several other subcontracts with aerospace firms and other minor aviation manufacturers were also established.

By March 1969, the design had been finalized. On 28 April 1971, the first XT-2 prototype was rolled out; it performed its maiden flight on 20 July 1971. The XT-2 subsequently became the first aircraft of Japanese design to break the sound barrier in level flight. It was followed by three more prototypes, two of these four prototypes were armed.

A total of 90 production T-2s were constructed, including 28 unarmed "T-2(Z)s", or "Zenkigata (early type)" and 62 armed "T-2(K)s", or "Kokigata (late type)"; some sources translate these variants as "T-2A" and "T-2B" respectively. An additional two T-2(Z)s were built but modified for the S-FX / F-1 strike fighter program. During 1988, the last T-2 rolled off the assembly line.

== Design ==
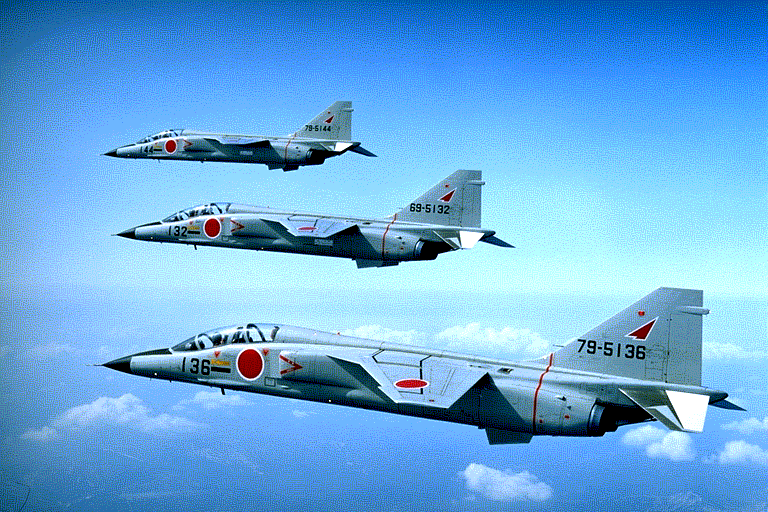
Formation flight of three T-2s

The T-2's configuration was clearly reminiscent of that of the two-seat Jaguar, with the two aircraft having the same overall configuration and some resemblance in details. In particular, the T-2 was also powered by a pair of Rolls-Royce Turbomeca Adour turbofans, the same engine type used by the Jaguar, that were license-built by Ishikawajima-Harima Heavy Industries under the designation "TF40-IHI-801A". Despite this similarity, the T-2 was not a direct copy of the Jaguar, and the two aircraft could be visually distinguished from one another; the T-2 had a more dart-like appearance, being noticeably longer and having a distinctly shorter wingspan than the Jaguar. Furthermore, the T-2 also had many detailed differences. For example, since the JASDF had no rough-field requirement, the T-2 possessed conventional single-wheeled landing gear, unlike the distinctive heavy duty landing gear present on the Jaguar.

The T-2 was composed primarily of aviation-grade aluminum alloys, though it featured selective use of titanium. The high-mounted wings had a leading edge sweep of 42.5° and a 9° anhedral. The wings feature noticeable "leading edge root extensions (LERX)" and full-span leading edge slats, with a "dogtooth" discontinuity on the outer edge of the span, though the dogtooth did not split the slat. There was a single ¾-span flap on the trailing edge, unlike the full-span double-slotted split flaps of the Jaguar, but the T-2 did have twin spoilers on each wing just forward of the flap for roll control instead of ailerons, another element clearly derived from the Jaguar. There was a small fence mounted inboard on the top of the wing. There were no fuel tanks in the wings.

Each Adour engine provided 22.75 kN (5,115 lbf) max dry thrust and 32.49 kN (7,305 lbf) afterburning thrust. The TF40-801As did not have the "part throttle reheat" feature added to Adour 102s as an engine-out safety feature, and the T-2 was never refitted with more powerful Adour engine variants, along the lines of the Adour 104 that was eventually refitted to British Jaguars, leaving the T-2 somewhat underpowered. The engine intakes had fixed rectangular geometry and fuselage splitter plates, plus a set of spring-loaded auxiliary inlets behind the intake lip for increased airflow in ground running. There were large service doors beneath the fuselage that provided excellent access to the engines for maintenance.

The T-2 was equipped with tricycle landing gear that featured single wheels, with the nose gear retracting backward and the main gear retracting forward into the fuselage, rotating 90° to lie flat, and incorporated an anti-skid control system. The nose gear was offset slightly to the right, with a small fixed vertical airfoil mounted in front of it to compensate for the extended nose gear's tendency to cause yaw. A runway arresting hook was fitted under the tail behind the engine exhausts. The tail assembly was conventional, featuring slab all-moving tailplanes with an anhedral of 15°. The steep anhedral kept the tailplanes out of the engine exhaust while allowing them to remain effective through the wing wash. Like the Jaguar, there was a fixed ventral fin under each exhaust, while two hydraulically-actuated airbrakes are fitted just forward of each ventral fin.

The crew sat in a tandem arrangement, the flight instructor being seated behind the student on a raised seat to give a good forward view. There was a windblast screen between the two cockpits. The aircrew sat under separate clamshell canopies on Weber ES-7J zero-zero (zero altitude, zero speed) ejection seats, built by Daiseru. The seats were furnished with specially-modified canopy penetrators to ensure safe ejection even if the canopy wasn't blown off. The seats also dispensed a cloud of radar-reflecting chaff on ejection to permit ground controllers to spot where the ejection occurred and direct search and rescue teams to the proper area.

Standard equipment for the armed T-2(K) included a Mitsubishi Electric J/AWG-11 search and ranging radar in the nose; a French Thomson-CSF head-up display (HUD) (license-built by Mitsubishi Electric); a Lear-Siegler 501OBL automatic heading and reference system (AHRS); as well as a UHF radio, an identification friend or foe (IFF) system, and a TACAN radio beacon navigation receiver system, all of which were built in Japan. The J/AWG-11 was very similar to the AN/AWG-11 fitted to the British Royal Air Force F-4M Phantom. The unarmed T-2(Z) lacked the radar, though apparently its avionics kit was otherwise the same as that of the T-2(K).

== Operational history ==
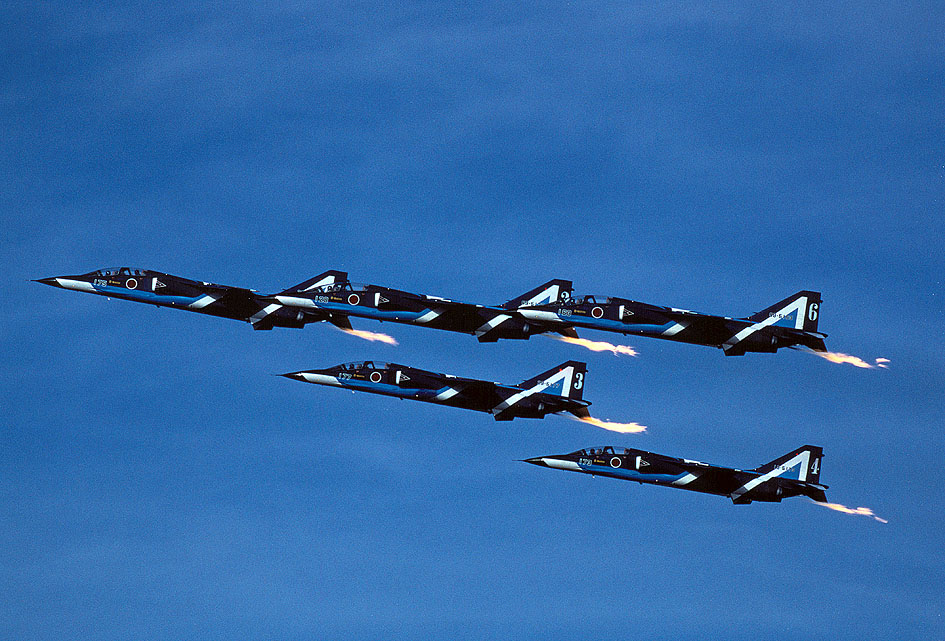
Mitsubishi T-2s of the Blue Impulse air display team

The XT-2 was redesignated T-2 on 29 August 1973, and entered service with the JASDF during 1975. The first unit to receive the type, the 21st Hikōtai, became fully operational on 1 October 1976; it was followed by a second squadron, the 22nd Hikōtai, on 5 April 1978, which permitted the service's remaining North American F-86 Sabres to be phased out of the advanced training role. The "Blue Impulse" aerobatic display team of the JASDF began flying the T-2 in the winter of 1981–82. Numerous T-2s were also used by a dedicated aggressor squadron before being replaced by the McDonnell Douglas F-15 Eagle fighters. T-2s were also used as conversion trainers for squadrons operating the Mitsubishi F-1, a development of the T-2.

The T-2 was retired by 2006, being replaced as an advanced trainer by the Kawasaki T-4 and as a conversion trainer by a two-seat version of the Mitsubishi F-2, which had replaced the F-1 in the anti-ship strike/ground attack role.

== Variants ==
- XT-2 : Prototypes.
- T-2(Z) : T-2 (前期型 Zenki-gata), T-2A. Two-seat advanced jet trainer aircraft (59 delivered to the ASDF training squadron in 1975)
- T-2(K) : T-2 (後期型 Kouki-gata), T-2B. Two-seat armed weapons training aircraft.
- T-2 CCV (ja) : Experimental "Control Configuration Vehicle" testbed, built from the third T-2 produced. Included three canards.

== Former operators ==
Japan

- Japan Air Self Defense Force
  - 21st Fighter Training Squadron (1976–2004)
  - 3rd Tactical Fighter Squadron (1978–2002)
  - 8th Tactical Fighter Squadron (1980–1997)
  - Tactical Fighter Training Group (1981–1990)
  - 6th Tactical Fighter Squadron (1981–2006)

== Specifications (T-2(K)) ==
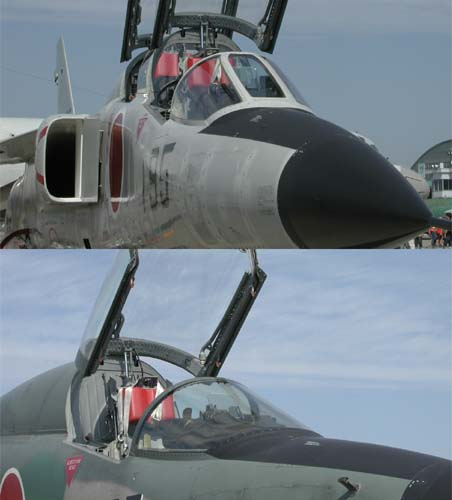
Canopies of a T-2 (above) and F-1 (below)

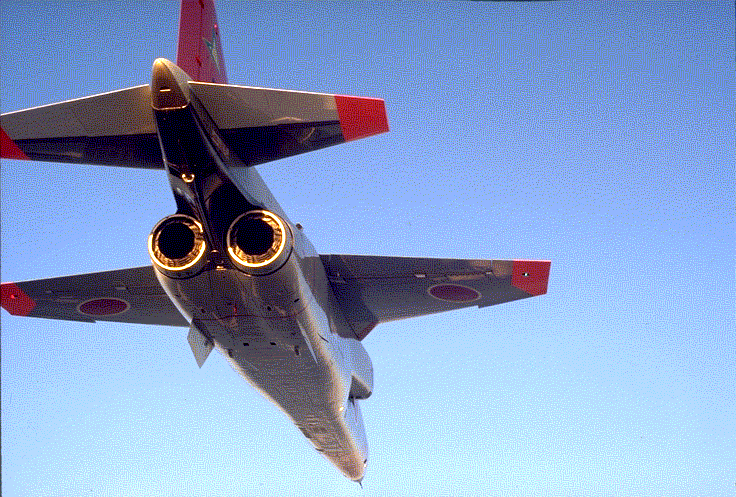
Rear view of a T-2

Data from Jane's All The World's Aircraft 1976–77

General characteristics

- Crew: 2
- Length: 17.85 m (58 ft 7 in)
- Wingspan: 7.88 m (25 ft 10 in)
- Height: 4.39 m (14 ft 5 in)
- Wing area: 21.8 m^{2} (235 sq ft)
- Aspect ratio: 3
- Airfoil: NACA 65 series (modified)
- Empty weight: 6,197 kg (13,662 lb)
- Gross weight: 9,675 kg (21,330 lb) clean
- Max takeoff weight: 12,800 kg (28,219 lb)
- Fuel capacity: 3,823 L (1,010 US gal; 841 imp gal) internal fuel, with provision for up to 3x 833 L (220 US gal; 183 imp gal) drop-tanks
- Powerplant: 2 × Ishikawa-Harima TF40-801A afterburning turbofan, 20.95 kN (4,710 lbf) thrust each dry, 31.76 kN (7,140 lbf) with afterburner

Performance

- Maximum speed: 1,700 km/h (1,100 mph, 920 kn) at 10,975 m (36,007 ft)
- Maximum speed: Mach 1.6 at 11,000 m (36,000 ft) at MTOW clean
- Ferry range: 2,870 km (1,780 mi, 1,550 nmi) with 3x drop tanks
- Service ceiling: 15,240 m (50,000 ft)
- Rate of climb: 177.833 m/s (35,006.5 ft/min)
- Required field length: 1,525 m (5,003 ft)

Armament

- Guns: 1 × 20 mm JM61A1 cannon
- Hardpoints: One centreline and two underwing pylons
- Missiles: Provision for two AIM-9 Sidewinder air-to-air missile on wingtip missile rails

== See also ==
Related development

- Mitsubishi F-1

Aircraft of comparable role, configuration, and era

- SEPECAT Jaguar
- Northrop T-38 Talon
