= Blue Impulse =

Aerobatic demonstration team of the Japan Air Self-Defense Force

Blue Impulse 11 Squadron 4th Air Wing
- Blue Impulse insignia
- Active: April 12, 1960 – present
- Country: Japan
- Branch: Japan Air Self-Defense Force
- Type: Aerobatics
- Role: Aerobatic maneuver
- Garrison/HQ: Matsushima Air Base
- Motto: Challenge for the Creation.
- Colors: Blue; White

Aircraft flown
- Trainer: 9 Kawasaki T-4s

Blue Impulse (ブルーインパルス, Burū Inparusu) (currently 11 Squadron 4th Air Wing, previously 21 Squadron 4th Air Wing) is the aerobatic demonstration team of the Japan Air Self-Defense Force (JASDF). The team was founded in 1960 as a team of six F-86 Sabres. They changed mounts to the Mitsubishi T-2 in 1980 and then to the Kawasaki T-4 in 1995. They are based at Matsushima Air Base, which was heavily damaged by the 2011 Tōhoku earthquake and tsunami.

== History ==
The first unofficial Japanese aerobatic team was formed in 1958 at Hamamatsu Air Base, flying Mitsubishi-built North American F-86F Sabres without a special colour scheme, disbanded after four demonstrations.

In 1959 the USAF Thunderbirds visited Japan and inspired JASDF commanders to establish an official aerobatic team. In 1960 the new team was formed at Hamamatsu airbase flying five F-86Fs of 2nd Squadron, with three of the pilots coming from the 1958 team.

The first demonstration of the "Tenryū" team, (named after the Tenryū River near the air base), was on 4 March 1960 at Hamamatsu, the name was found to be hard to pronounce in western languages, so the team was renamed Blue Impulse. The aircraft were equipped with smoke generators using five different colours for each aircraft: white, red, blue, green and yellow and painted in silver, light blue, blue and pink; on the leader's aircraft, the blue is replaced by gold. Later, in 1961, all five aircraft received a special paint scheme of overall white with blue flashes.

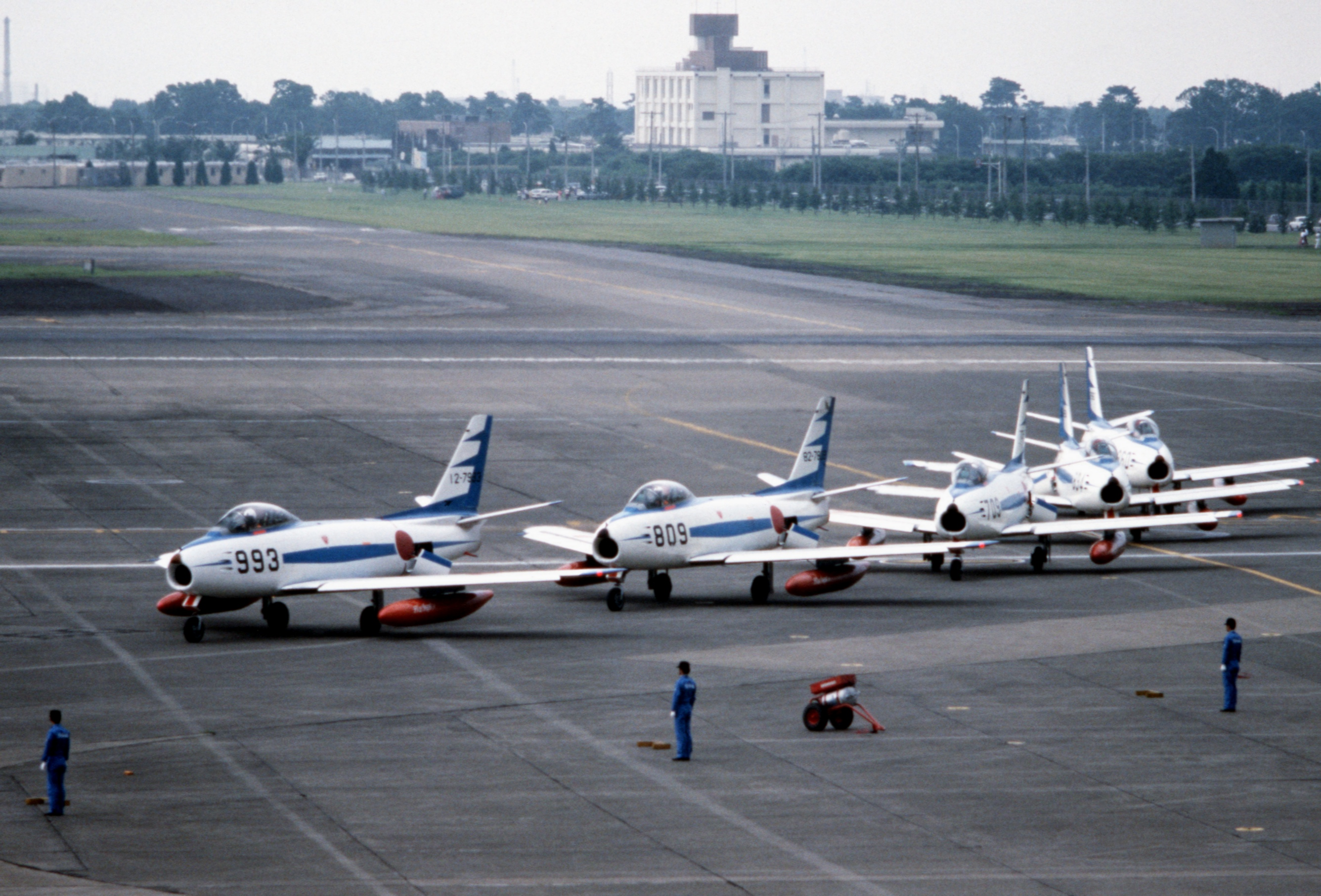
Blue Impulse F-86s at Yokota AB, 1981

In 1964, Blue Impulse performed at the opening of the 1964 Summer Olympics in Tokyo, drawing the Olympic rings in the air with coloured smoke. In 1970, at the opening of Expo '70 in Osaka, the team drew "Expo '70" in the air.

In February 1982, after 545 air demonstrations, Blue Impulse replaced the Sabres with Mitsubishi T-2 trainers, performing their first show with the new aircraft was on 25 June 1982 at the team's new Matsushima airbase.

At Expo '90 in Osaka, Blue Impulse performed at the opening event and drew the "Expo '90" logo in the air.

The team's last performance with the Mitsubishi T-2 was in December 1995, after 175 demonstrations with these aircraft. The new Blue Impulse aircraft became the Japanese-built Kawasaki T-4 trainer, and the first show with these aircraft was on 5 April 1996.

In 1997, the team made their first foreign debut at the Nellis Air Force Base air show in Nevada, USA.

In 1998 Blue Impulse performed at the Winter Olympics in Nagano, Japan.

Blue Impulse also performed at the 2002 FIFA World Cup; on 4 June 2002, they performed at the opening of the Japan versus Belgium match.

On March 11, 2011, Matsushima Air Base, where Blue Impulse had been based, sustained heavy damage from the Tohoku earthquake and tsunami. Because on the day before, the aircraft and crew had travelled to Ashiya Air Base in Fukuoka to perform at the opening ceremony of the Kyushu Shinkansen, the team escaped damage from the disaster. While the crew continued to be based in Matsushima to aid in recovery efforts, they were required to travel to other bases for flight training while Matsushima underwent repairs.

On March 30, 2013, the Blue Impulse fully returned to Matsushima Air Base following the completion of repairs and anti-tsunami measures.

== Aircraft ==
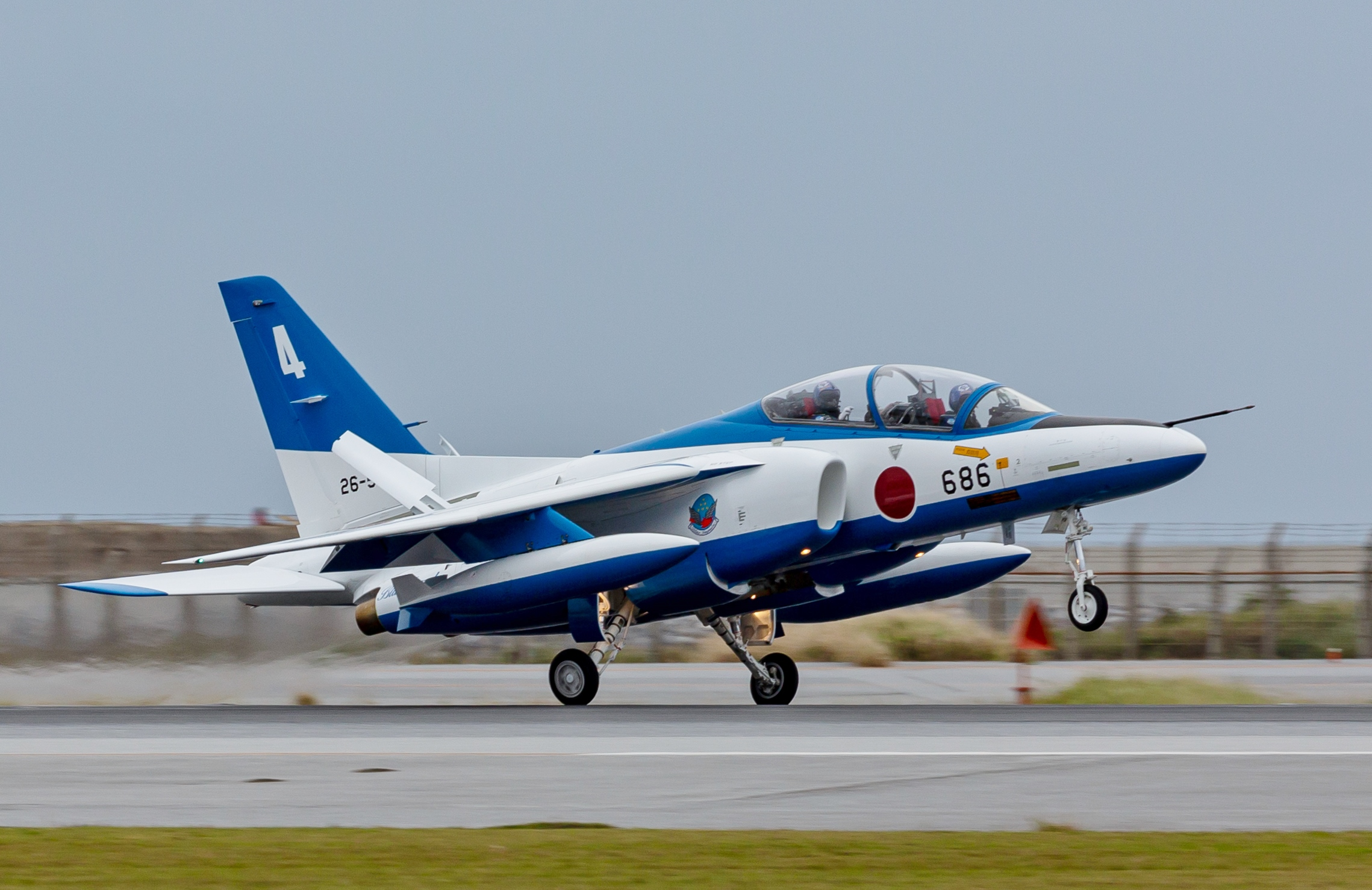
Blue Impulse T-4 landing at Naha Air Show 2018

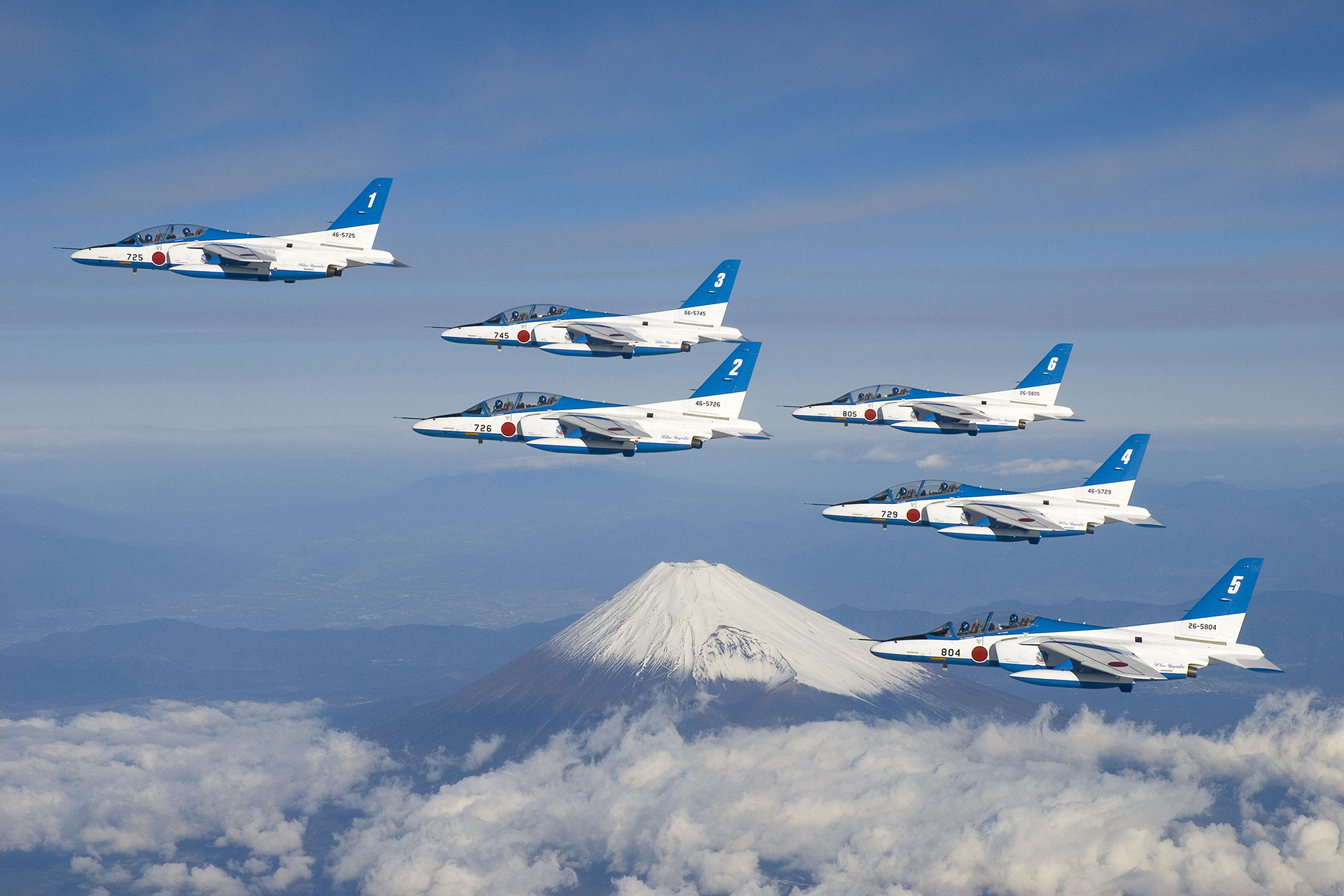
Blue Impulse T-4s in 2017

Aircraft	Origin	In service (Note: Number of aircraft used by the Blue Impulse acrobatic team.)	Service (Note: Aircraft service with the Blue Impulse acrobatic team.)	Reference column
North American F-86F Sabre	United States	34	1960–1981	JASDF Technical Research Section. Five aircraft formation.
Mitsubishi T-2	Japan	11	1982–1995	Four AW 21 Sq. Technical Research Section. Six aircraft formation.
Kawasaki T-4	Japan	11	1995–present	Four AW 11 Sq. 6 aircraft formation.

== Accidents and incidents ==
Data from:

21 July 1961
F-86F-40 Sabre, 02–7976, crashed during aerobatic training into the sea, near Cape Irago, Tahara, Aichi. The pilot, Major Katou Matsuo, was killed.
24 November 1965
F-86F-40 Sabre, 02–7975, aerodynamically stalled and crashed near the west end of the runway at Hamamatsu Air Base during aerobatic training. First Lieutenant Shiromaru was killed in the crash.
4 November 1972
F-86F-40 Sabre, 72–7773, crashed at or near the Iruma River, whilst returning to base after a demonstration flight. First Lieutenant Kaneko ejected safely at 210 m (700 ft).
14 November 1982
T-2B Blue Impulse #4, 19–5174, crashed during a down-ward bomb-burst manoeuvre at a Hamamatsu air display, having failed to pull up in time and crashed into a residential building near the airfield. The pilot was killed, as were 10 people on the ground, with another 13 injuries, as well as damaging 28 civilian houses and about 290 cars. This accident brought performances a halt for the remainder of the year.
4 July 1991
Over the Pacific Ocean, T-2A, 59-5112 and T-2B,19-5172, (#2 and #4), collided during a training flight after flying into sea fog near Mount Kinka, Miyagi Prefecture, causing suspension of demonstration flights for a year. Captain Hamaguchi Seiji and Captain Shikichi Yutaka were both killed.
4 July 2000
Aircraft #5 and #6 collided about 25 km (16 mi) East of Matsushima Air Base, claiming the lives of three team members.
20 March 2002
A T-4 suffered a bird strike.
14 October 2006
T-4 #5 suffered a bird strike at Gifu AB during training for an airshow but landed safely.
29 January 2014
Two Blue Impulse T-4s collided during a four-ship practice flight 72 km (45 mi) from Matsushima Air Base, both aircraft landed safely with no injuries. The Leader's aircraft (#1) had nose damage, while the other involved aircraft, #2, lost half of its left horizontal stabiliser.
