= Anti-ship missile =

Missile used to attack ships

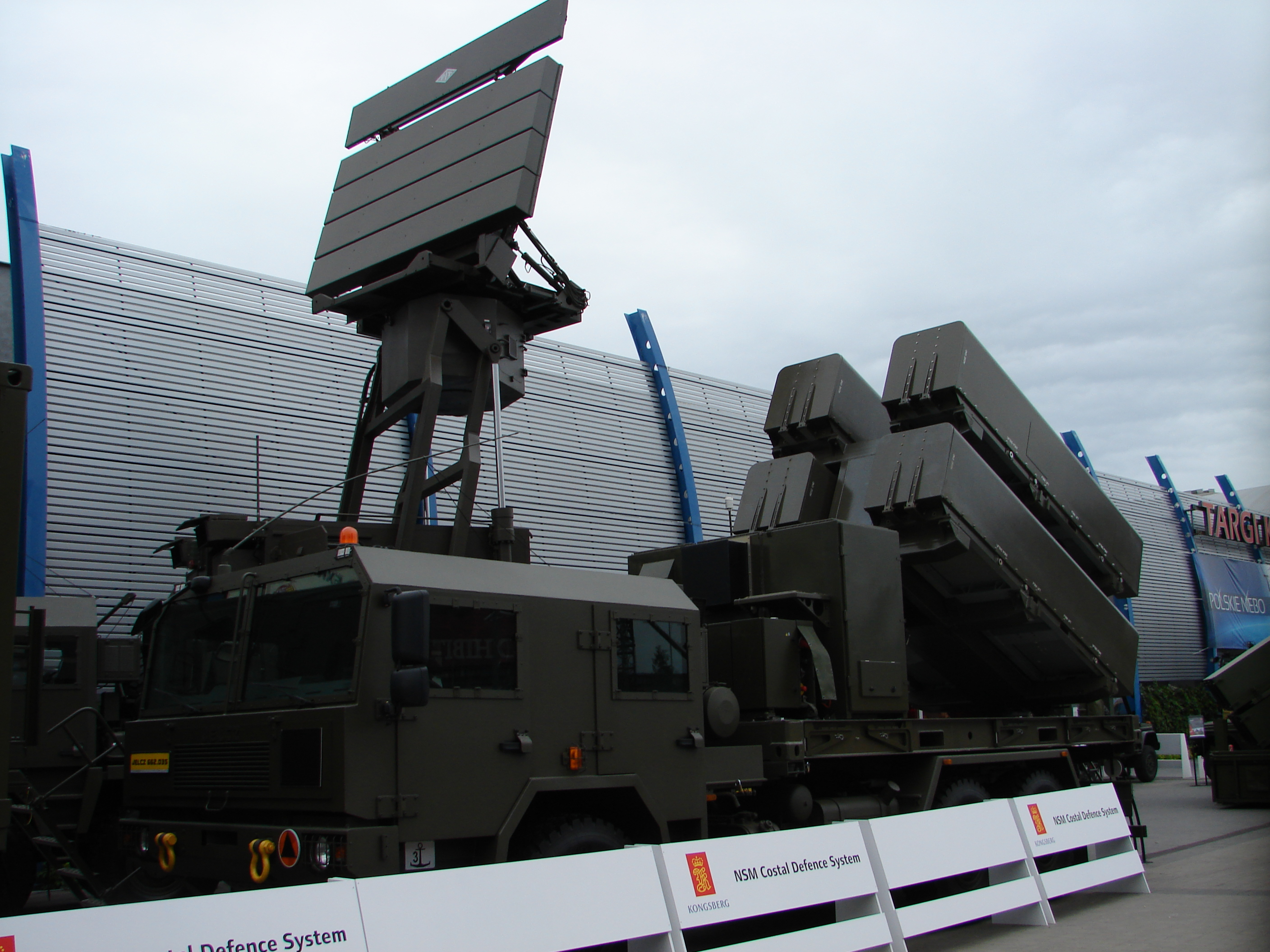
Polish Navy's land based Naval Strike Missile coastal defense system launcher and TRS-15M Odra 3D radar in the background

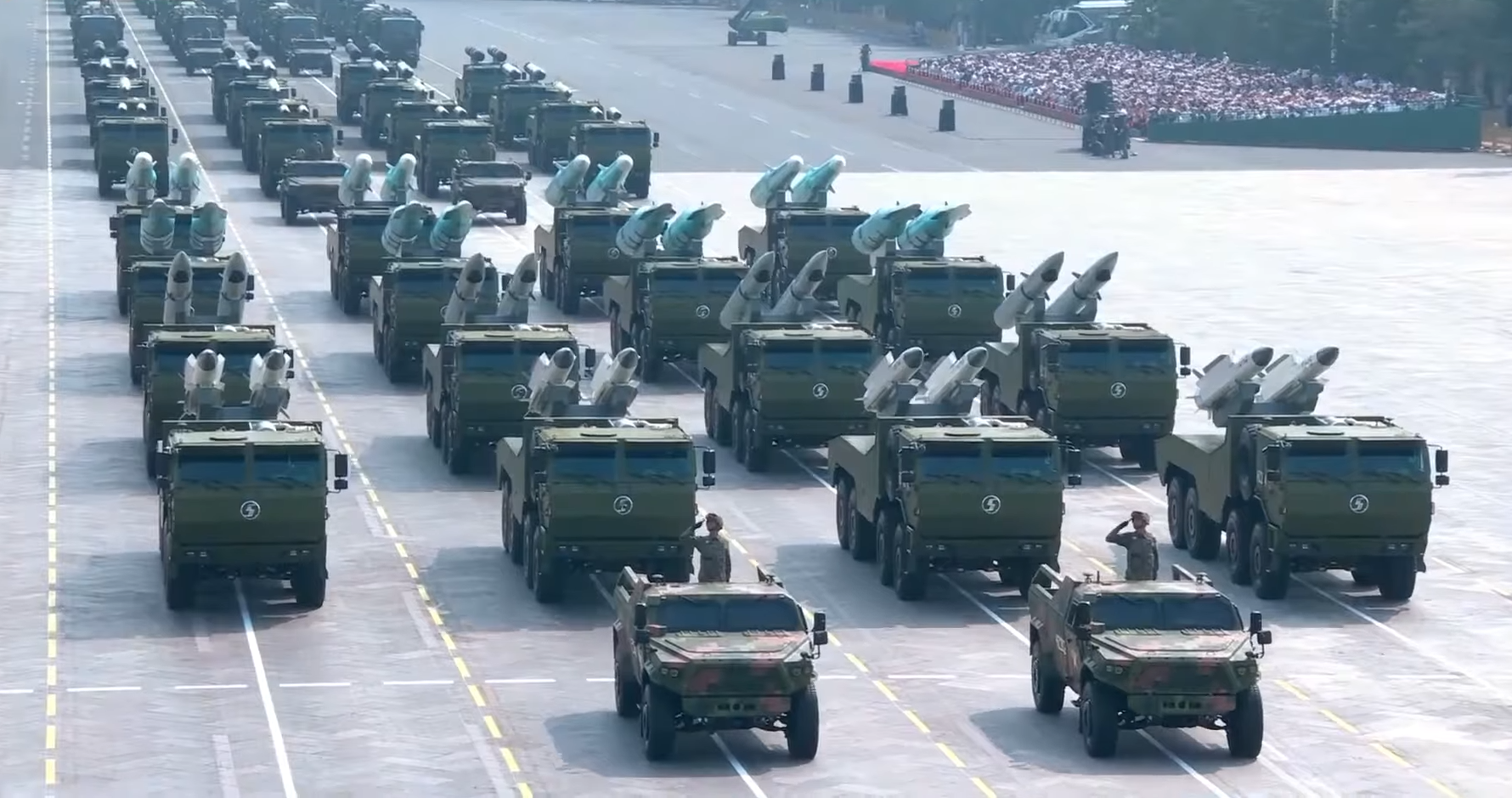
Chinese YJ-15, YJ-17, YJ-19 and YJ-20 anti-ship missiles at the 2025 China Victory Day Parade

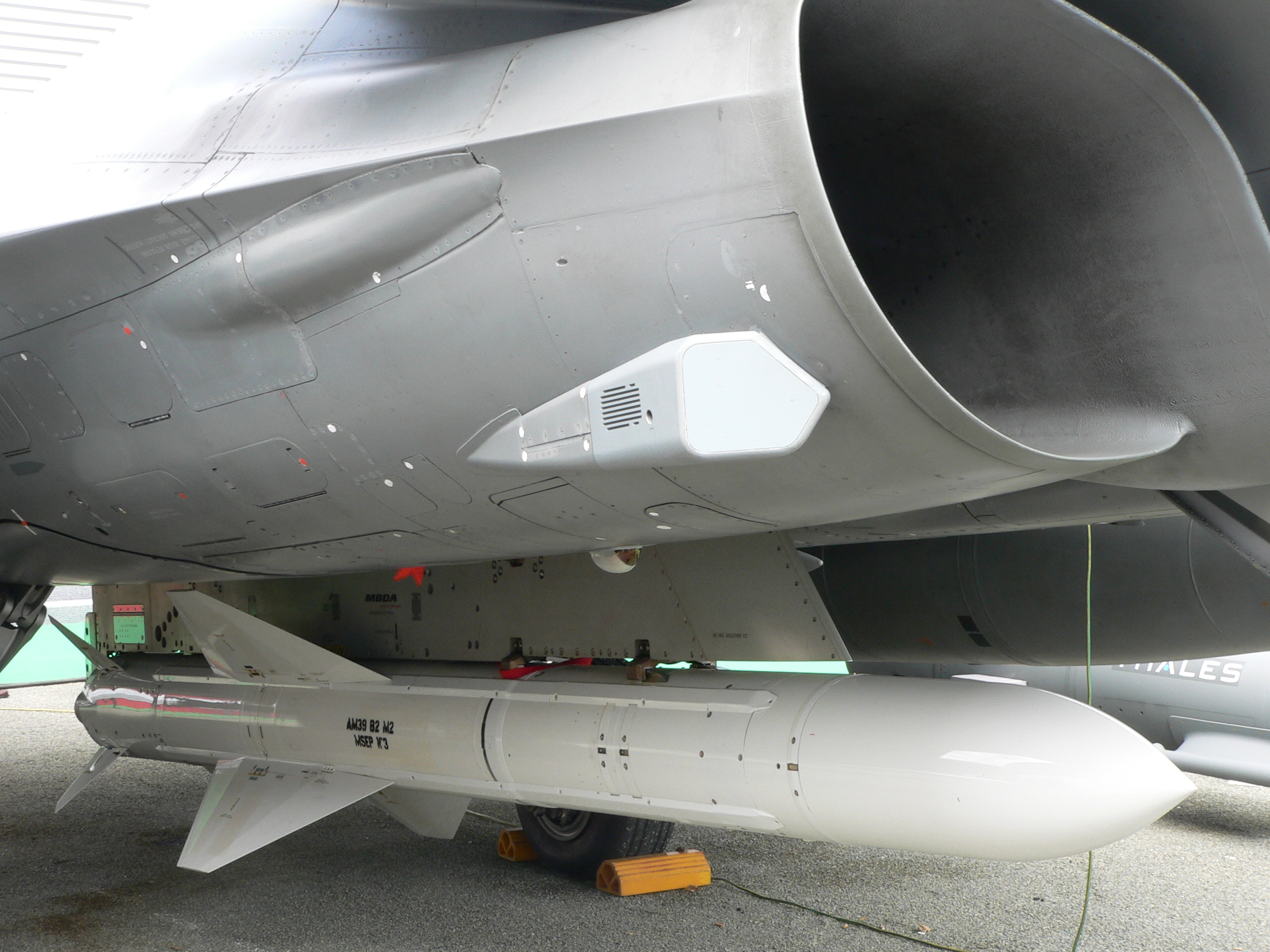
French Exocet anti-ship missile under a Dassault Rafale multirole fighter

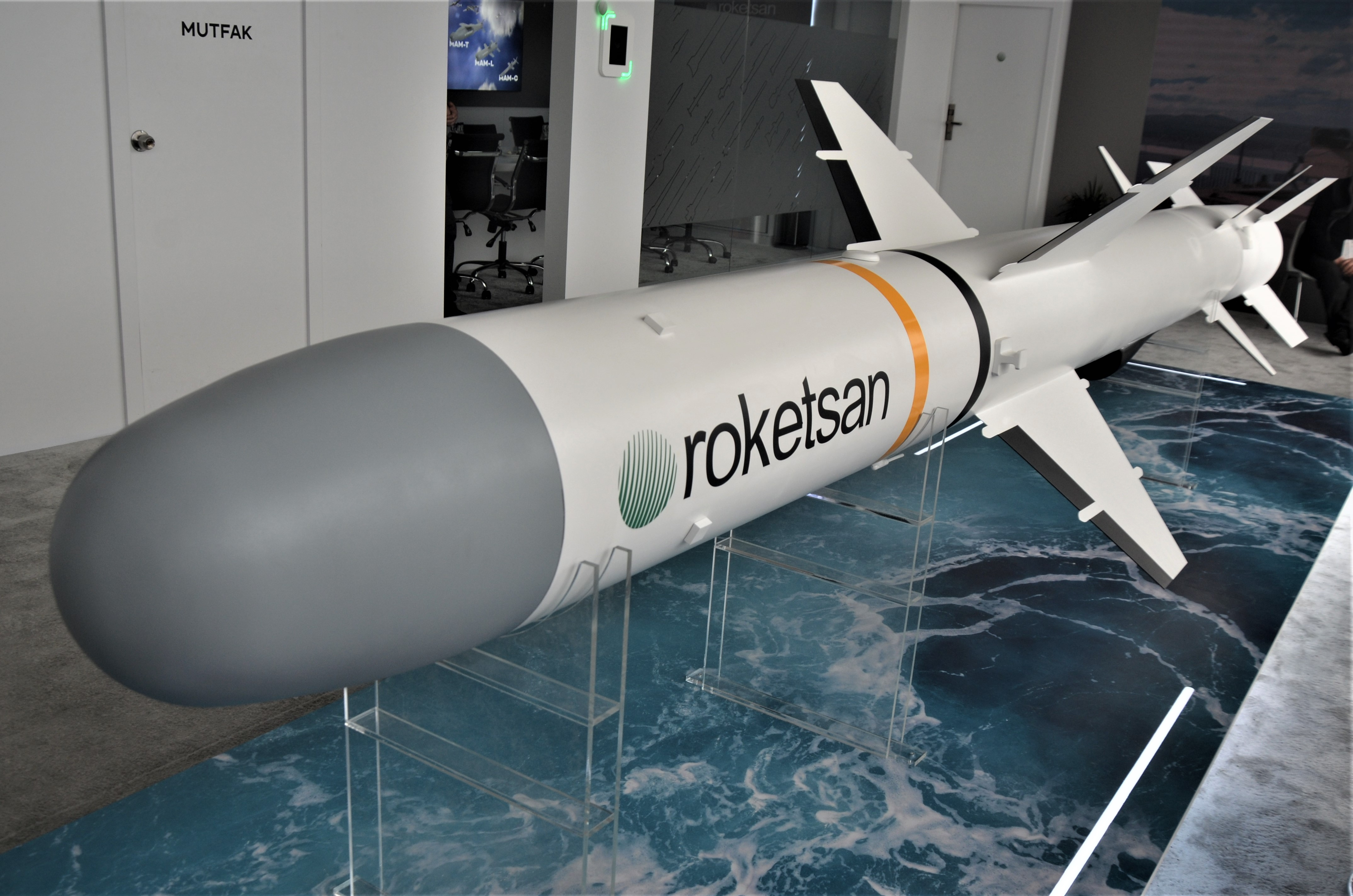
Turkish Roketsan Atmaca anti-ship missile at Teknofest in 2023

An anti-ship missile (AShM or ASM) is a guided missile that is designed for use against ships and large boats. Most anti-ship missiles are of the sea-skimming variety, and many use a combination of inertial guidance and active radar homing. A large number of other anti-ship missiles use infrared homing to follow the heat that is emitted by a ship; it is also possible for anti-ship missiles to be guided by radio command all the way.

Many anti-ship missiles can be launched from a variety of weapons systems including surface warships, submarines, bombers, fighter planes, patrol planes, helicopters, shore batteries, land vehicles, and, conceivably, even infantrymen firing shoulder-launched missiles. The term surface-to-surface missile (SSM) is used when appropriate. The longer-range anti-ship missiles are often called anti-ship cruise missiles.

== Etymology ==
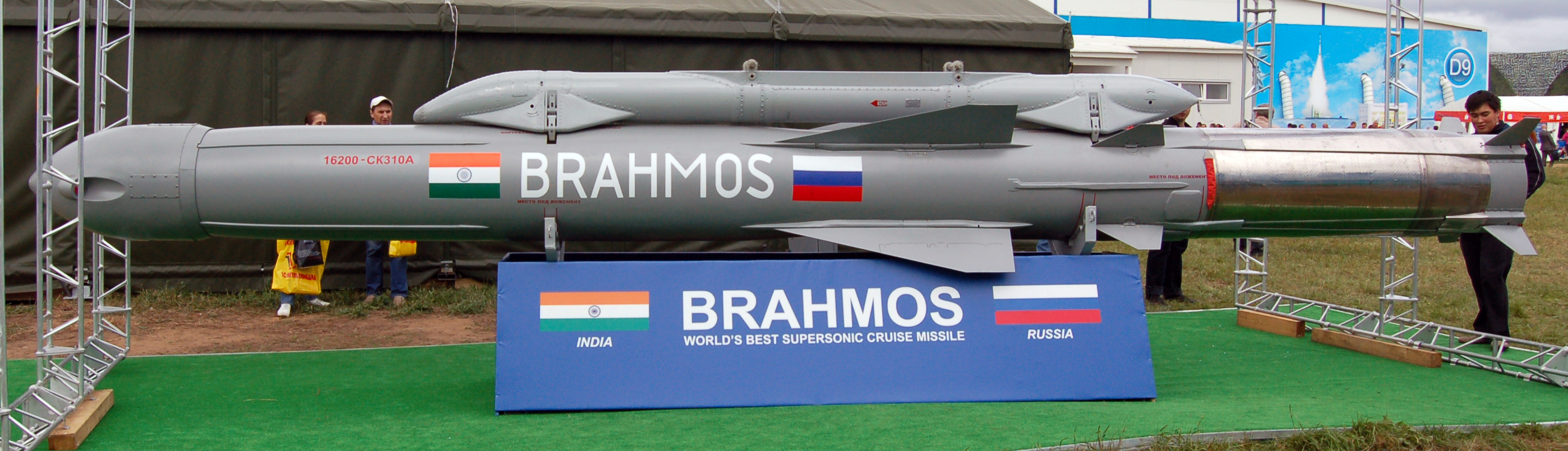
BrahMos, a supersonic cruise missile, capable of being launched from multiple platforms

Both "AShM" and "ASM" are utilized interchangeably as an acronym for "anti-ship missile." "AShM" is the preferred acronym when confusion with "air-to-surface missile" (commonly abbreviated as "ASM") may occur.

== History ==
During the Cold War, the Soviet Union turned to a sea denial strategy concentrating on submarines, naval mines and the AShM. One of the first products of the decision was the SS-N-2 Styx missile. Further products were to follow, and they were soon loaded onto the Soviet Air Force's Tu-95 Bear and Tu-22 Blinder bombers, in the case of the air-launched KS-1 Komet.

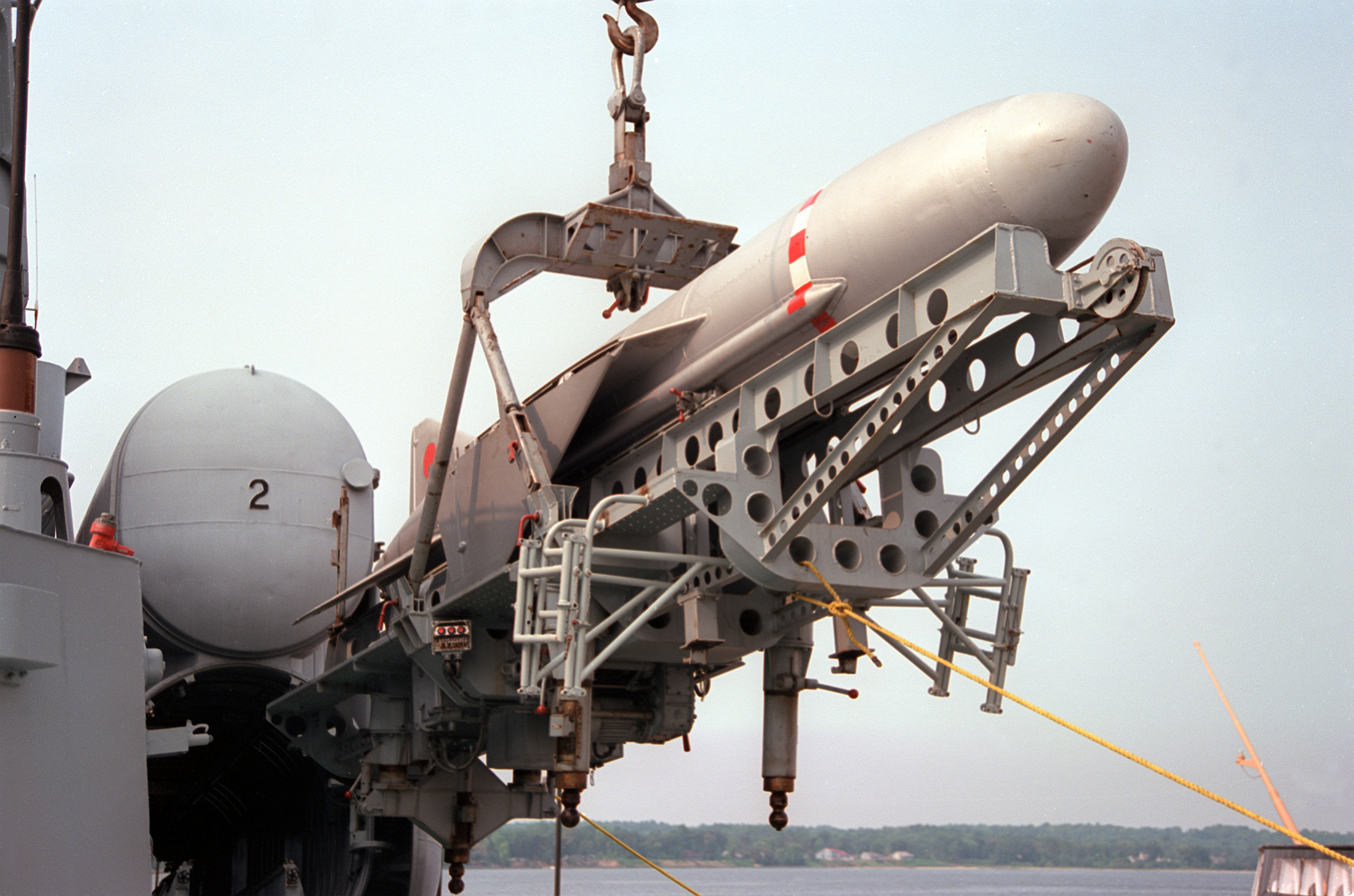
P-15 unloaded from missile tube aboard USNS Hiddensee

In 1967, the Israeli Navy's destroyer Eilat was the first ship to be sunk by a ship-launched missile—a number of Styx missiles launched by Egyptian Komar-class missile boats off the Sinai Peninsula.

In the Indo-Pakistani War of 1971 the Indian Navy conducted two raids using Osa-class missile boats employing the Styx on the Pakistani naval base at Karachi. These raids resulted in the destruction or crippling of approximately two thirds of the Pakistani Navy. Major losses included two destroyers, a fleet oiler, an ammunition ship, approximately a dozen merchant ships, and numerous smaller craft. Major shore-based facilities, including fuel storage tanks and naval installations were also destroyed. The Osas returned to base without loss.

The Battle of Latakia in 1973 (during the Yom Kippur/Ramadan War) was the scene of the world's first combat between missile boats. In this battle, the Israeli Navy destroyed Syrian warships without suffering any damage, using electronic countermeasures and ruses for defence. After defeating the Syrian Navy the Israeli missile boats also sank a number of Egyptian warships, again without suffering any damage in return, thus achieving total naval supremacy for the rest of the war.

Anti-ship missiles were used in the 1982 Falklands War. The British warship HMS Sheffield, a Type 42 destroyer, was struck by a single air-launched Exocet and later sank as a result of the damage. The container ship Atlantic Conveyor was hit by two Exocets and burnt out and subsequently sank while under tow. HMS Glamorgan was damaged when she was struck by an MM38, a ship-launched version of the Exocet, fired from a launcher taken from the Argentine Navy destroyer ARA Comodoro Seguí and mounted on a trailer by Navy technicians, but she had taken evasive action that limited the damage.

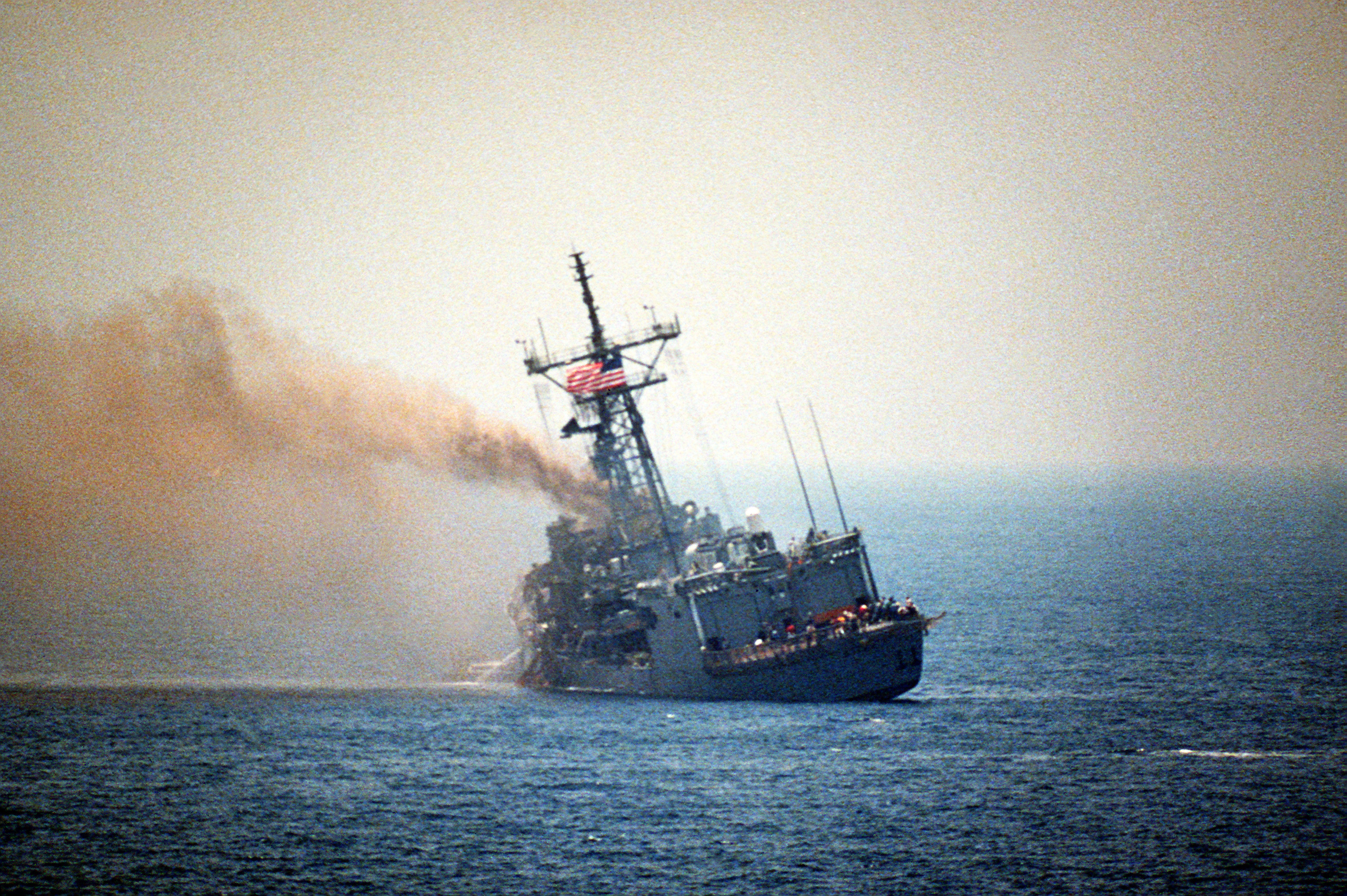
Stark listing following two hits by Exocet missiles

In 1987, a US Navy guided-missile frigate, USS Stark, was hit by an Exocet anti-ship missile fired by an Iraqi Mirage F-1 fighter plane. Stark was damaged, but she was able to steam to a friendly port for temporary repairs.

In October 1987, Sungari, an American-owned tanker steaming under the Liberian flag, and Sea Isle City, a Kuwaiti tanker steaming under the American flag, were hit by Iranian HY-2 missiles.

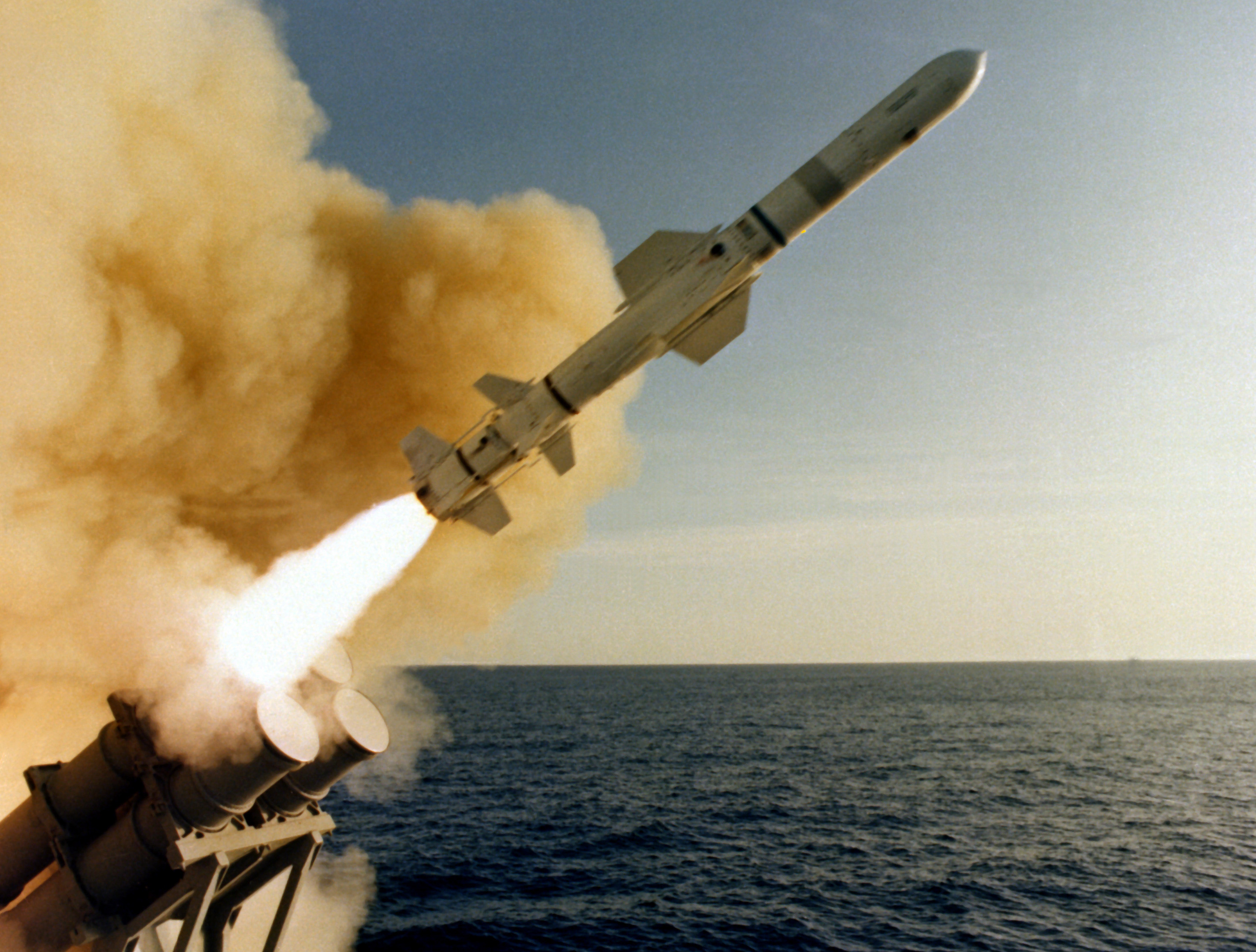
RGM-84 Harpoon firing from USS Leahy in 1983

In 1988 AShMs were fired by both American and Iranian forces in Operation Praying Mantis in the Persian Gulf. During this naval battle, several Iranian warships were hit by American AShMs (and by the US Navy's Standard missiles—surface-to-air missiles which were doing double-duty in the anti-ship role). The US Navy hit the Iranian Navy frigate Sahand with three Harpoon missiles, four AGM-123 Skipper rocket-propelled bombs, a Walleye TV-guided bomb, and several 1,000 lb (454 kg) "iron bombs". Despite the large number of munitions and successful hits, Sahand did not sink until fire reached her ammunition magazine, causing it to detonate, sinking the vessel. In the same engagement, American warships fired three Standard missiles at an Iranian Navy corvette. This corvette had such a low profile above the water that a Harpoon missile that arrived several minutes later could not lock onto it with its targeting radars.

In 2006, Lebanese Hezbollah fighters fired an AShM at the Israeli corvette INS Hanit, inflicting battle damage, but the warship managed to return to Israel in one piece and under its own power. A second missile in the same salvo struck and sank an Egyptian merchant ship.

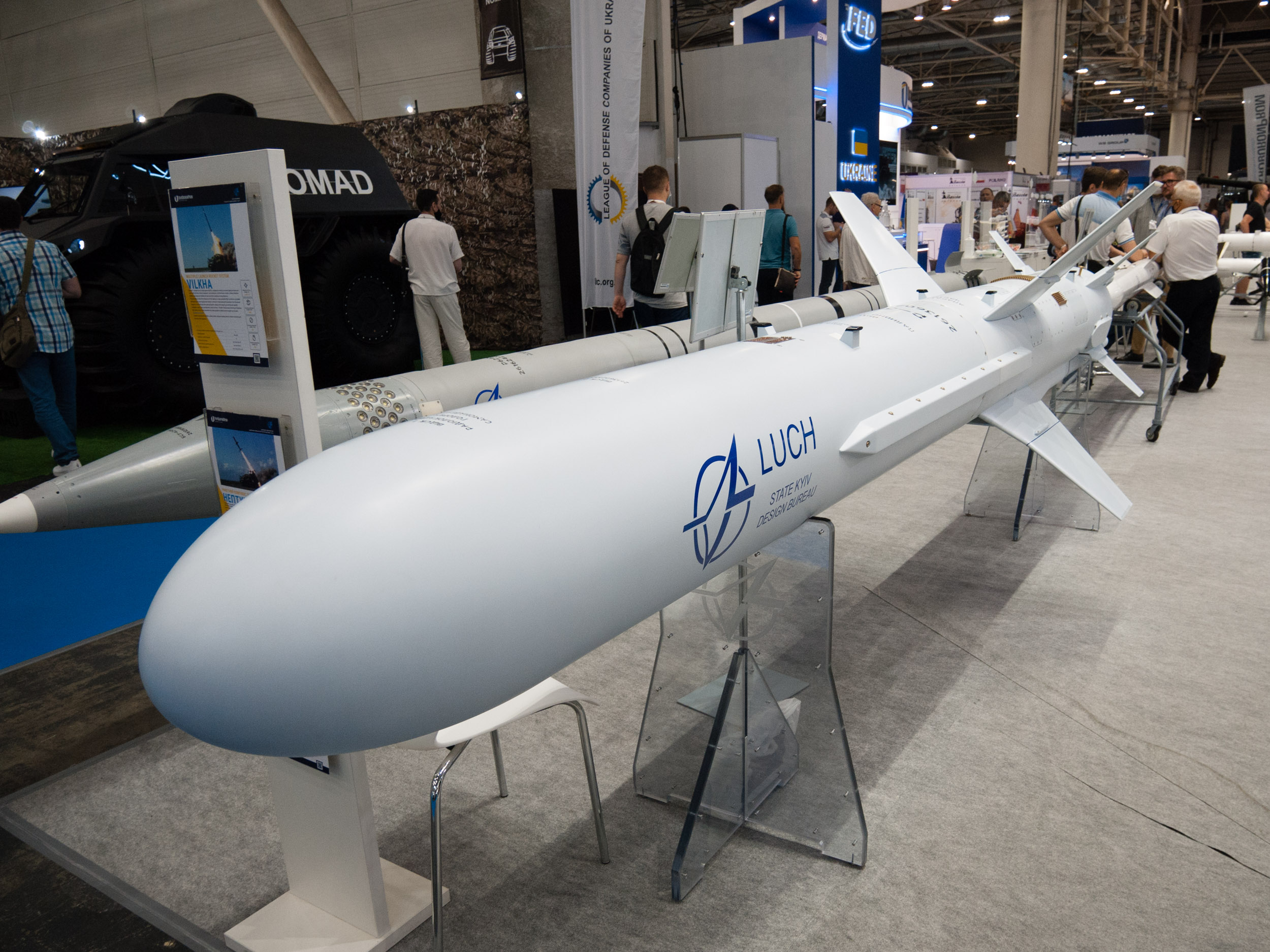
R-360 Neptune anti-ship missile

On 13 April 2022, the Ukrainian government claimed to have hit the Russian cruiser Moskva with two R-360 Neptune missiles, resulting in its sinking. The Russian government did not confirm the attack, but admitted that the ship sank after a fire. If Ukrainian claims are true, Moskva might be the largest warship ever disabled or destroyed by a missile, according to Carl Schuster, a retired US Navy captain and former director of operations at the US Pacific Command's Joint Intelligence Center.

== Threat posed ==
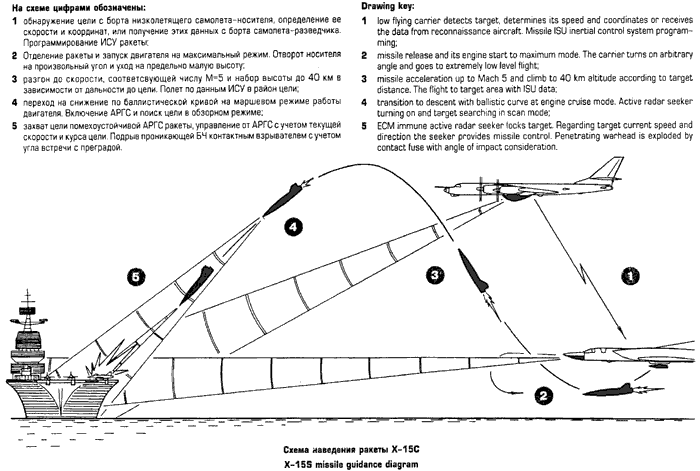
Attack against an aircraft carrier using a Kh-15S

Video of Russian P-1000 Vulkan missile destroying a target ship

Anti-ship missiles are a significant threat to surface ships, which have large radar, radio, and thermal signatures that are difficult to suppress. Once acquired, a ship cannot outrun or out-turn a missile, the warhead of which can inflict significant damage. To counter the threat posed, the modern surface combatant has to either avoid being detected, destroy the missile launch platform before it fires its missiles, or decoy or destroy all of the incoming missiles.

Modern navies have spent much time and effort developing counters to the threat of anti-ship missiles since the Second World War. Anti-ship missiles have been the driving force behind many aspects of modern ship design, especially in navies that operate aircraft carriers.

The first layer of antimissile defence by a modern, fully equipped aircraft carrier task force is always the long-range missile-carrying fighter planes of the aircraft carrier itself. Several fighters are kept on combat air patrol (CAP) 24 hours a day, seven days a week when at sea, and many more are put aloft when the situation warrants, such as during wartime or when a threat to the task force is detected.

Brazilian frigate Rademaker firing a MANSUP anti-ship missile in September 2024

These fighters patrol up to hundreds of miles away from the task force and they are equipped with airborne radar systems. When spotting an approaching aircraft on a threatening flight profile, it is the responsibility of the CAP to intercept it before any missile is launched. If this cannot be achieved in time, the missiles themselves can be targeted by the fighters's own weapons systems, usually their air-to-air missiles, but in extremis, by their rapid-fire cannon.

However, some AShMs might "leak" past the task force's fighter defences. In addition, many modern warships operate independently of carrier-based air protection and they must provide their own defences against missiles and aircraft. Under these circumstances, the ships themselves must utilize multilayered defences which have been built into them.

For example, some warships, such as the US Navy's Ticonderoga-class cruisers, the Arleigh Burke-class destroyers, and the Royal Navy's Type 45 guided missile destroyer, use a combination of radar systems, integrated computer fire-control systems, and agile surface-to-air missiles (SAM) to simultaneously track, engage, and destroy several incoming anti-ship missiles or hostile warplanes at a time.

The primary American defensive system, called the Aegis Combat System, is also used by the navies of Japan, Spain, Norway, South Korea, and Australia. The Aegis system has been designed to defend against mass attacks by hostile anti-ship missiles or warplanes.

Any missiles that can elude the interception by medium-ranges SAM missiles can then be either deceived with electronic countermeasures or decoys; shot down by short-range missiles such as the Sea Sparrow or the Rolling Airframe Missile (RAM); engaged by the warship's main gun armament (if present); or, as a last resort, destroyed by a close-in weapon system (CIWS), such as the American Phalanx CIWS, Russian Kashtan CIWS, or the Dutch Goalkeeper CIWS.

=== Current threats and vulnerabilities ===
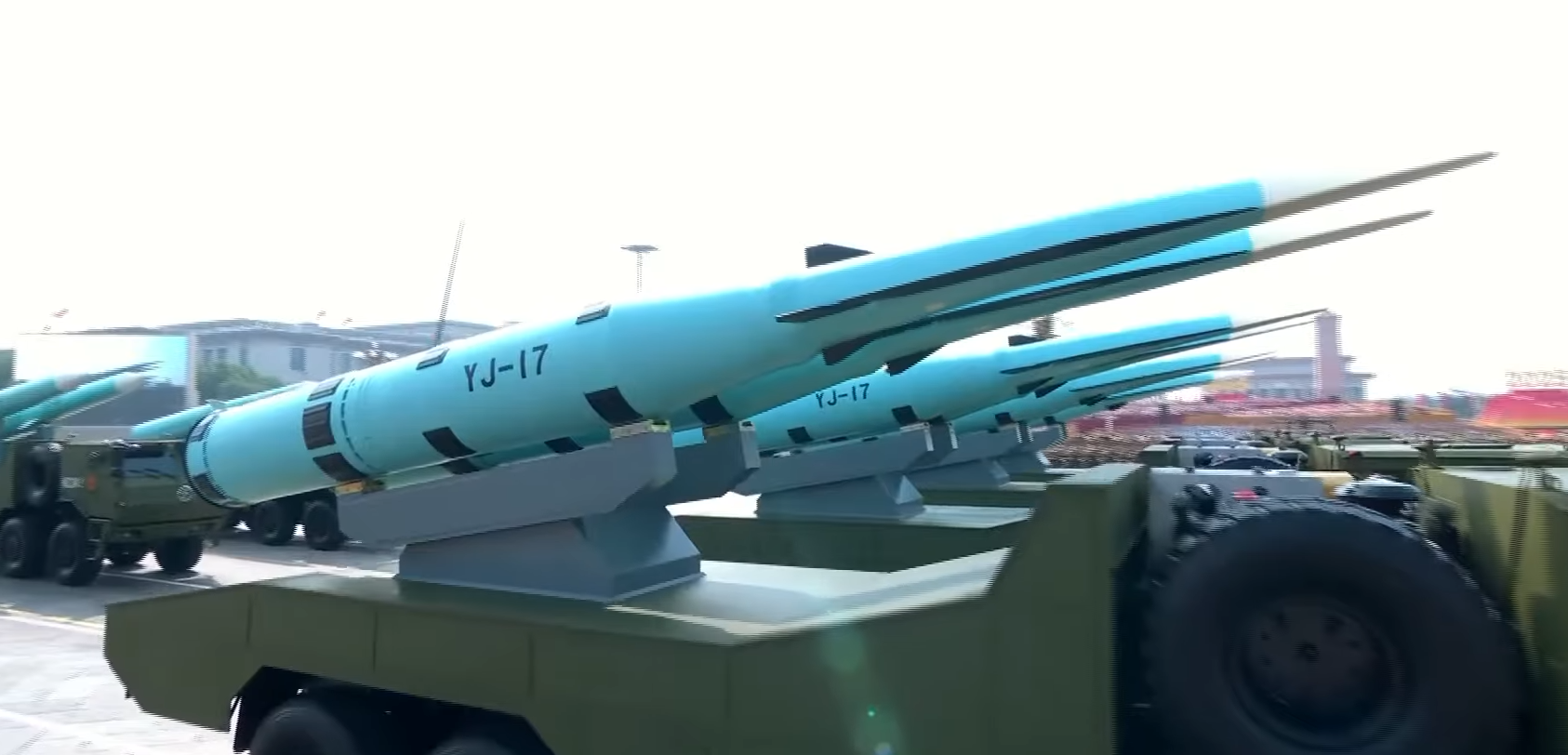
YJ-17 is a hypersonic anti-ship ballistic missile, featuring a hypersonic glide vehicle (HGV) warhead.

To counter these defence systems, countries such as Russia are developing or deploying missiles that slowly cruise at a very low level (about five meters above sea level) to within a short range of their target and then, at the point when radar detection becomes inevitable, initiate a supersonic, high-agility sprint (potentially with anti-aircraft missile detection and evasion) to close the terminal distance. Missiles, such as the SS-N-27 Sizzler, that incorporate this sort of threat modality are regarded by US Navy analysts as potentially being able to penetrate the US Navy's defensive systems.

Recent years have seen a growing amount of attention being paid to the possibility of ballistic missiles being re-purposed or designed for an anti-ship role. Speculation has focused on the development of such missiles for use by China's People's Liberation Army Navy. Such an anti-ship ballistic missile would approach its target extremely rapidly, making it very difficult to intercept. In response to China's development of anti-ship missiles and other anti-access/area denial capabilities, the United States has developed the AirSea Battle doctrine.

== Countermeasures and defences ==
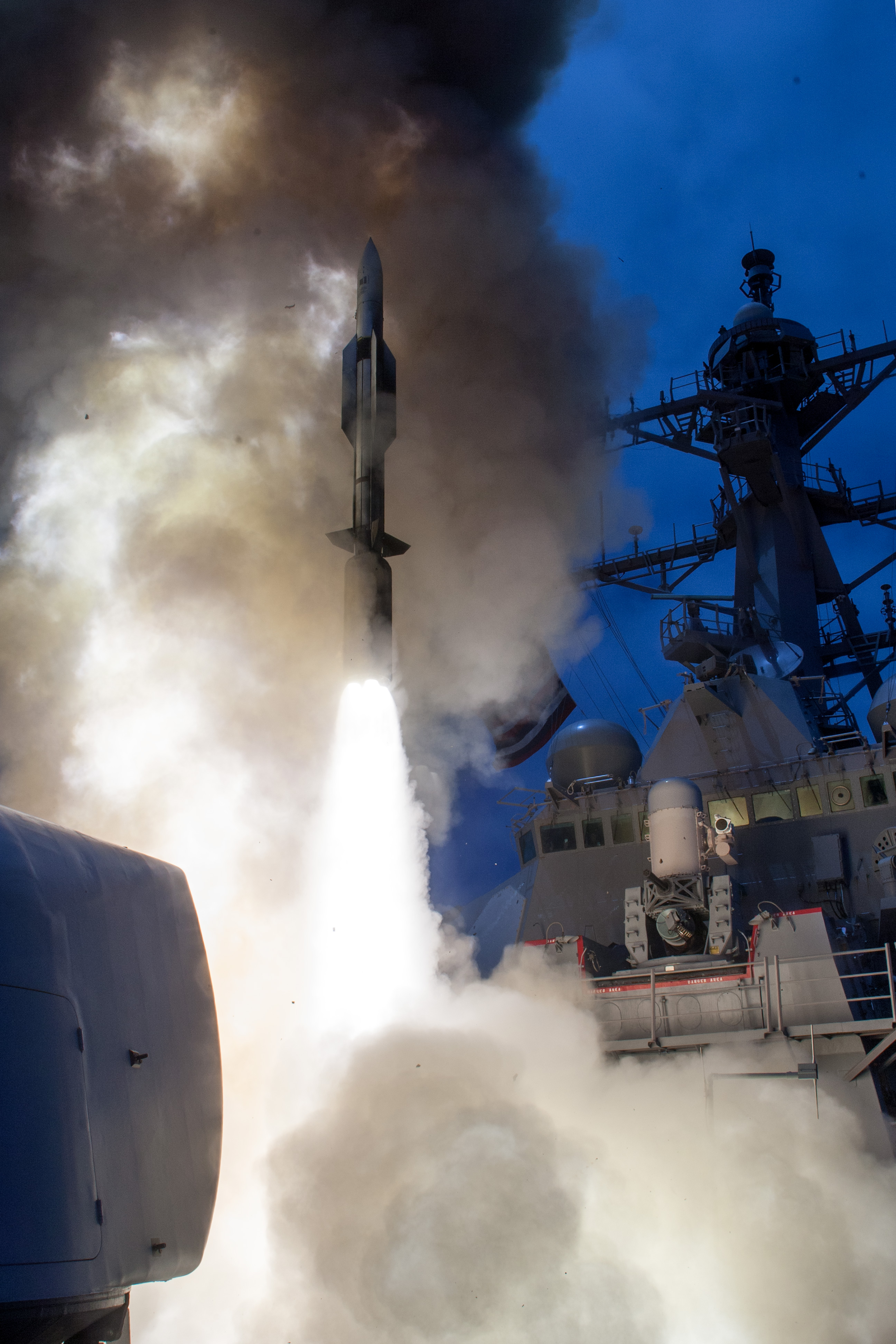
American RIM-174 Standard ERAM surface-to-air missile used to counter anti-ship missile threats. The missile can also used as an anti-ship missile for Secondary role.

Russian naval 9M317M surface-to-air-missile launching from vertical launching system

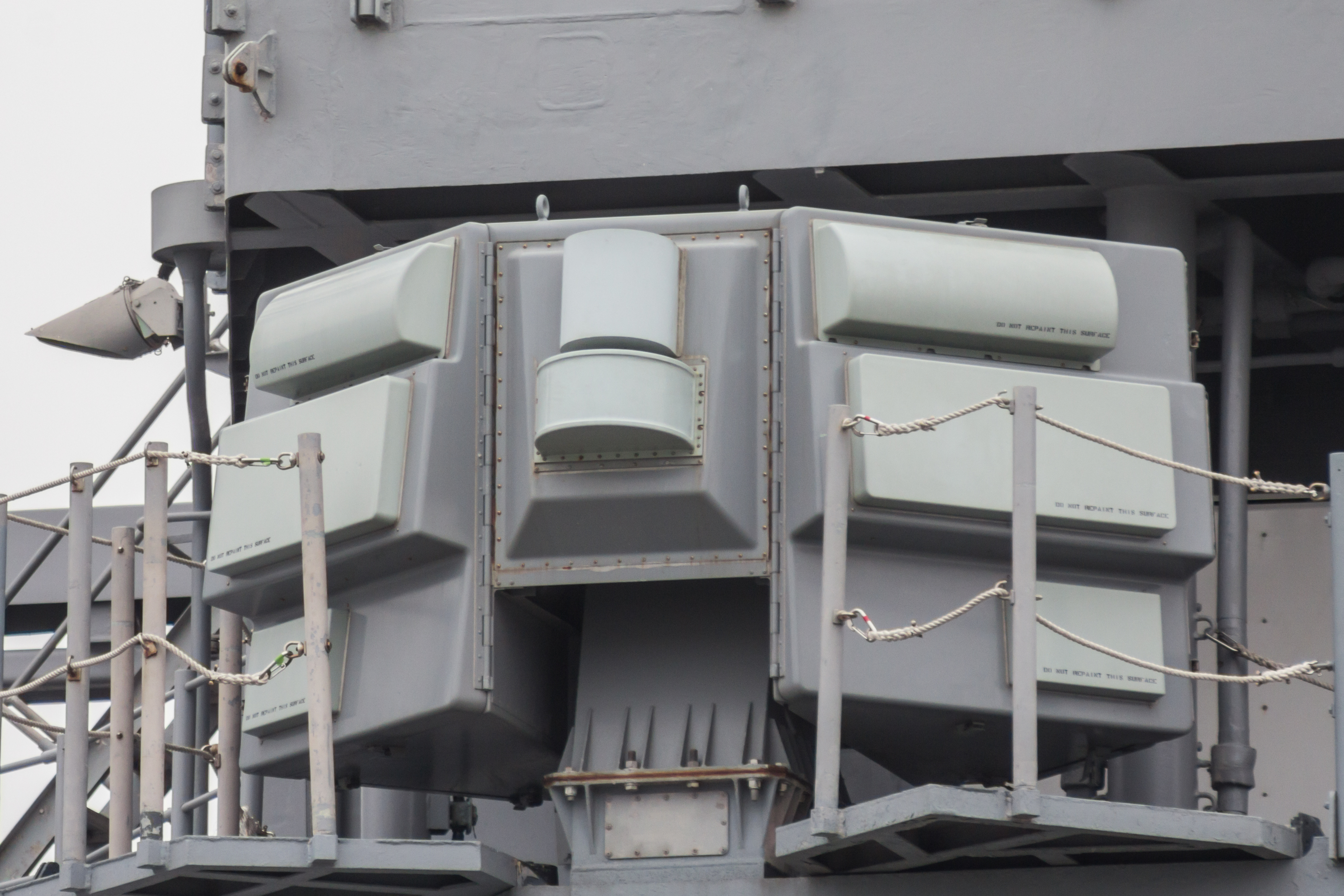
AN/SLQ-32 (V)3 electronic warfare suite aboard USS Lake Erie

Countermeasures against anti-ship missiles include

- Surface-to-air missiles
- Close-in weapon systems (CIWS), including the Soviet-or Russian-made AK-630 or Kashtan, Turkish Aselsan GOKDENIZ, German Millennium Gun or the Phalanx and Goalkeeper. These are automated gun systems mounted on the deck of a ship that use radar to track the approaching missile, and then attempt to shoot it down during its final approach to the target.
- Anti-aircraft guns such as the Mk 45 5-inch (127 mm) naval gun or the AK-130
- Electronic warfare equipment (such as AN/SLQ-32 Electronic Warfare Suite)
- Decoy systems (such as chaff, the US Navy's Mark 36 SRBOC system), and flares, or more active decoys such as the Nulka

Ships that employ some stealth technology can reduce the risk of detection and make themselves a harder target for the missile through the use of passive countermeasures including:

- reduction of their radar cross section (RCS) and hence radar signature.
- limiting the ship's infrared and acoustic signature.

=== History of combat interceptions ===
==== Gulf War ====
On 25 February 1991, during the first Gulf War, the Phalanx-equipped USS Jarrett was a few miles from USS Missouri and the destroyer HMS Gloucester. The ships were attacked by an Iraqi Silkworm missile (often referred to as the Seersucker), at which Missouri fired its SRBOC chaff. The Phalanx system on Jarrett, operating in the automatic target-acquisition mode, fixed upon Missouri's chaff, releasing a burst of rounds. From this burst, four rounds hit Missouri which was two to three miles (3.2 to 4.8 km) from Jarrett at the time. There were no injuries. A Sea Dart missile was then launched from HMS Gloucester, which destroyed the Iraqi missile, achieving the first successful engagement of a missile by a missile during combat at sea.

==== 2016 attacks off the coast of Yemen ====
On 9 October 2016, Mason, operating near the Bab-el-Mandeb strait, was targeted by two missiles fired from Houthi-controlled territory. Both missiles fell short and crashed into the water. The Houthi insurgency denied launching the attack on the warship. The United States Naval Institute reported that Mason fired two SM-2 Standard missiles and one RIM-162 ESSM missile to intercept the two missiles, and deployed her Nulka missile decoy. One of two U.S. defence officials cited anonymously added that it was not clear whether the incoming missiles had been shot down or crashed into the water on their own. This marked the first recorded instance of ship-based anti-air missiles being fired from vertical launching cells in combat in response to an actual inbound missile threat.

On 12 October 2016 Mason was again targeted by missiles fired from Yemeni territory, while it was operating in the Bab el-Mandeb strait. Mason was not hit by the two missiles, which were fired from near the southern Yemen city of Al Hudaydah. While the Navy was not certain whether the first incoming missile was intercepted or instead just fell into the sea, officials said Mason successfully intercepted the second missile at a distance of about 8 miles (13 km), marking the first time in history a warship destroyed an inbound anti-ship missile with a SAM in actual self-defence. On 13 October 2016, the U.S. attacked three radar sites in Houthi-held territory which had been involved in the earlier missile attacks, with cruise missiles launched from Nitze. The Pentagon assessed that all three sites were destroyed.

On 15 October 2016, Mason was targeted in a third attack by Houthi rebels based in Yemen, by five anti-ship cruise missiles while operating in the Red Sea north of the Bab el-Mandeb strait. Mason fired a radar decoy, an infrared decoy, and several SM-2 Standard missiles in response, either neutralizing or intercepting four of the five incoming missiles. The Navy reported the fifth incoming missile as neutralized by a radar decoy launched from Nitze, after Mason alerted her to the threat.

==== 2023 Houthi missile attacks ====
On 26 December 2023, USS Laboon shot down three ASBMs in the Red Sea fired by Houthi rebels with multiple SM-6s. This was its first intercept of a ballistic missile in combat. On 30 December, the Danish container ship Maersk Hangzhou issued a distress call after coming under fire from four small ships commanded by Iranian-backed Houthi rebels from Yemen. Attempts were also made to board Maersk Hangzhou by force, while a contracted security team defended the ship. USS Gravely and the aircraft carrier USS Dwight D. Eisenhower responded to a distress call from the container ship. Verbal commands were radioed to the Houthi ships, while helicopters from Eisenhower were dispatched. After taking small arms fire, U.S. Navy helicopters returned fire, sinking three of the four Houthi ships. There was no damage to U.S. equipment or personnel. In the process of responding to the distress call, Gravely shot down two anti-ship ballistic missiles fired from Yemen.

On 9 January 2024, at approximately 9:15 p.m. (Sanaa time), Iranian-backed Houthis launched a complex attack of Iranian designed one-way attack UAVs (OWA UAVs), anti-ship cruise missiles, and an anti-ship ballistic missile from Houthi-controlled areas of Yemen into the Southern Red Sea, towards international shipping lanes where dozens of merchant vessels were transiting. Eighteen OWA UAVs, two anti-ship cruise missiles, and one anti-ship ballistic missile were shot down by a combined effort of F/A-18s from Dwight D. Eisenhower, Gravely, Laboon, Mason, and the United Kingdom’s HMS Diamond. This was the 26th Houthi attack on commercial shipping lanes in the Red Sea since 19 November. There were no injuries or damage reported.

On 14 January, an anti-ship missile was fired in the direction of Laboon from a Houthi-controlled portion of Yemen, according to CENTCOM. Two weeks later, on 30 January 2024, USS Carney shot down an ASBM in the Gulf of Aden fired by Houthi rebels with an SM-6. On 30 January, Gravely used its Phalanx CIWS to shoot down an incoming anti-ship cruise missile fired by the Houthis. U.S. officials said that the missile came within one mile (1.6 km) of the destroyer. No damage or injuries were reported.

On 6 February 2024 at 4:30 p.m., while patrolling in the Gulf of Aden, Laboon, operating near the mercantile ship Star Nasia, intercepted and shot down an anti-ship ballistic missile fired by the Iranian-backed Houthis. Later in the month, on 20 February at 12:30 a.m., while operating in the Gulf of Aden, Laboon detected and shot down one anti-ship cruise missile fired by the Houthis.

== Comparison ==
Name	Year	Weight	Warhead	Range	Speed	Propulsion	Launch platform	Guidance	Force	Comments
3M22 Zircon	2022	Size 4 pcs instead of 1 P-700 for 1 launcher	300–400 kg (660–880 lb) conventional or nuclear	400 km (220 nmi) (export) >1,000 km (540 nmi) (domestic)	Minimum 4700 km/h (Mach 5 to 6) potentially up to Mach 8	Liquid fuel scramjet	Surface, submarine	?	Russia	
3M-54 Kalibr (SS-N-27 "Sizzler")	1993	1,300 kg (2,900 lb)	200 kg (440 lb)	660 km (360 nmi)	0.8 M, 2.5/2.9M	Turbojet	Surface, sub, shipping container	Inertial, active radar	Russia	Used in combat. Variants: 3M-54E Klub and 3M-54E1 Klub
P-1000 Vulkan	1987	6,300 kg (13,900 lb)	500 kg (1,100 lb)	700 and 1000 (appx.) km (or 800 km)	3,825 km/h (2,065 kn)	Solid-fuel ramjet	Surface	Inertial, active radar homing/anti radar, mid course correction	USSR/Russia	
P-800 Oniks (SS-N-26)	2002	3,000 kg (6,600 lb)	250 kg (550 lb)	800 km (430 nmi) (Oniks-M); 600 km (320 nmi) (Domestic version for Russia)	3,600 km/h (1,900 kn)	Ramjet	Surface, air	Active-passive, radar	Russia	
P-700 Granit	1983	7,000 kg (15,000 lb)	750 kg (1,650 lb)	625 km (337 nmi)	2,550 km/h (1,380 kn)	Solid-fuel ramjet	Surface	Inertial, active radar homing/anti radar, mid course correction	USSR/Russia	
P-500 Bazalt (SS-N-12 SANDBOX)	1975	4,500 kg (9,900 lb)	1000 kg / 350 kt nuclear	550 km (300 nmi)	3,060 km/h (1,650 kn)	Liquid fuel rocket	Surface, submarine	Semi-active, terminal active radar	USSR	
P-270 Moskit (SS-N-22 SUNBURN)	1984	4,500 kg (9,900 lb)	320 kg (710 lb)	120 km (65 nmi)	3,600 km/h (1,900 kn)	Ramjet	Surface, air	Active radar, infrarred	USSR	
P-120 Malakhit (SS-N-9 SIREN)	1972	2,953 kg (6,510 lb)	500 kg (1,100 lb)	110 km (59 nmi)	Mach 0.9	Turbojet, solid fuel	Surface	Inertial, mid course correction, active radar	USSR	Used in combat
P-70 Ametist (SS-N-7 STARBRIGHT)	1967	3,500 kg (7,700 lb)	500 kg (1,100 lb)	65 km (35 nmi)	1,050 km/h (570 kn)	Solid rocket	Sub	Inertial, terminal homing	USSR	
P-15 Termit (SS-N-2 STYX)	1960	3,100 kg (6,800 lb)	454 kg (1,001 lb)	80 km (43 nmi)	1,100 km/h (590 kn)	Liquid fuel rocket	Surface	Active radar, infrarred	USSR	Used in combat
P-5 Pyatyorka (SS-N-3 "Shaddock")	1959	5,000 kg (11,000 lb)	1,000 kg (2,200 lb)	750 km (400 nmi)	1,000 km/h (540 kn)	Turbojet	Surface	Inertial, mid course correction, active radar	USSR	
Kh-15 (AS-16 Kickback)	1980	1,200 kg (2,600 lb)	150 kg conventional/nuclear	300 km (160 nmi)	6,125 km/h (3,307 kn)	Solid-fuel rocket	Air	Inertial/Active radar	USSR/Russia	
Kh-35 (AS-20 KAYAK)	2003	520 kg (1,150 lb)	145 kg (320 lb)	130 km (70 nmi)	970 km/h (520 kn)	Turbofan	Surface, air	Inertial, active radar	USSR/Russia/North Korea	
Kh-22 (AS-4 Kitchen)	1968	5,820 kg (12,830 lb)	1000 kg conventional/nuclear	400 km (220 nmi)	4,000 km/h (2,200 kn)	Liquid-fuel rocket	Air	Inertial	USSR/Russia	
KSShch (SS-N-1 "Scrubber")	1958	2,300 kg (5,100 lb)	Nuclear	40 km (22 nmi)	1,150 km/h (620 kn)	Liquid-fuel rocket	Surface	Inertial	USSR	
SM-6	2013	1,500 kg (3,300 lb)	64 kg (141 lb)	370 km (200 nmi)	4,287.7 km/h (2,315.2 kn)	two stage/solid rocket booster	surface ships, transporter erector launcher	Inertial guidance, active radar homing, semi active radar homing	United States	(The anti-ship version will enter service in 2023.)
AGM-158C LRASM	2013 / 2018	~900 kg	450 kg	370–560 km (200–300 nmi)	High subsonic	Turbojet	Air, ship	Passive radar and infrared homing	United States	
AGM-123 Skipper II	1985	582 kg (1,283 lb)	450 kg (990 lb)	25 km (13 nmi)	1,100 km/h (590 kn)	Solid-fuelled	Air	Laser-guided	United States	Used in combat
BGM-109 Tomahawk	1983	1,200 kg (2,600 lb)	450 kg (990 lb)	1,666 km (900 nmi) (Block V)	880 km/h (480 kn)	Turbofan	Air, surface, submarine	GPS, TERCOM, DSMAC	United States	(Previous anti-ship version withdrawn from service in 1994, new anti-ship version will enter service in 2023.)
Harpoon	1977	691 kg (1,523 lb)	221 kg (487 lb)	280 km (150 nmi)	864 km/h (467 kn)	Turbojet engine	Air, surface, submarine	Radar (B3: midcourse update)	United States	Used in combat
AGM-65F Maverick	1972	300 kg (660 lb)	140 kg (310 lb)	30 km (16 nmi)	1,150 km/h (620 kn)	Solid propellant	Air	Laser, infrarred	United States	Used in combat
Bat	1944	1,000 kg (2,200 lb)	727 kg (1,603 lb)	37 km (20 nmi)	260–390 km/h (140–210 kn)	None	Air	Active radar	United States	Used in combat
YJ-21	2022	4,000–5,000 kg (8,800–11,000 lb)	500 kg (1,100 lb)	1,500 km (810 nmi)	Mach 6 – Mach 10 (4,000–6,610 kn)	Solid propellant	Air, surface	Inertial, GNSS, active radar	China	
CM-400	2012	910 kg (2,010 lb)	150–200 kg (330–440 lb)	250 km (130 nmi)	Mach 3 (2,000 kn)	Solid propellant	Air, surface	Inertial, GNSS, passive radar, imaging infrared (IIR), TV/CCD	China	Used in combat
YJ-18	2015	1,579 kg (3,481 lb)	140–300 kg (310–660 lb)	220–540 km (120–290 nmi)	Mach 0.8 – Mach 3.0 (530–1,980 kn)	Turbojet, solid propellant	Air, surface	Inertial, GNSS, active radar	China	
YJ-12	2011	2,000 kg (4,400 lb)	205–250 kg (452–551 lb)	460–500 km (250–270 nmi)	Mach 2.5 – Mach 4 (1,650–2,600 kn)	Ramjet	Air, surface	Inertial, GNSS, active radar	China	
YJ-100	2006	1,500–1,800 kg (3,300–4,000 lb)	500 kg (1,100 lb)	1,000–1,500 km (540–810 nmi)	Mach 0.75 – Mach 0.8 (496–530 kn)	Turbofan	Air, surface	Inertial, GNSS, active radar, imaging infrared (IIR)	China	
C-704	2006	360 kg (790 lb)	130 kg (290 lb)	38 km (21 nmi)	Mach 0.8 (530 kn)	Solid propellant	Air, surface	Inertial, active radar, imaging infrared (IIR), TV/CCD	China	
YJ-9	2006	105 kg (231 lb)	30 kg (66 lb)	25 km (13 nmi)	Mach 0.9 (600 kn)	Solid propellant	Air, surface	Inertial, active radar, imaging infrared (IIR), TV/CCD, semi-active laser	China	
YJ-83	1998	800 kg (1,800 lb)	165–190 kg (364–419 lb)	180 km (97 nmi)	Mach 0.8 – Mach 1.4 (530–926 kn)	Turbojet	Air, surface	Inertial, active radar	China	Used in combat
YJ-62	2005	1,140 kg (2,510 lb)	210 kg (460 lb)	400 km (220 nmi)	Mach 0.8 (530 kn)	Turbojet	Surface	Inertial, active radar	China	
YJ-8	1990	815 kg (1,797 lb)	165 kg (364 lb)	42 km (23 nmi)	Mach 0.9 (600 kn)	Solid propellant	Air, surface	Inertial, active radar	China	Used in combat
YJ-6	1986	2,240 kg (4,940 lb)	513 kg (1,131 lb)	100 km (54 nmi)	Mach 0.9 (600 kn)	Liquid propellant	Air	Inertial, active radar	China	Used in combat
MMP	2017	15 kg (33 lb)	?	5 km (2.7 nmi)	?	Solid propellant	Surface	Infrared	France	
ANL/Sea Venom	2017	120 kg (260 lb)	30 kg (66 lb)	20 km (11 nmi)	1,040.4 km/h (561.8 kn))	Two-stage solid-propellant rocket motor	Air (helicopter), Surface	Infrared	France/United Kingdom	
AS.34 Kormoran	1991	630 kg (1,390 lb)	220 kg (490 lb)	35 km (19 nmi)	1,101 km/h (594 kn)	Rocket	Air	Inertial, active radar	France/Germany	
AS.15TT/MM.15	1985	96 kg (212 lb)	30 kg (66 lb)	15 km (8.1 nmi)	1,008 km/h (544 kn)	Solid propellant	Air	Inertial	France	
ARMAT	1984	550 kg (1,210 lb)	160 kg (350 lb)	120 km (65 nmi)	1,100 km/h (590 kn)	Solid propellant	Air	Passive radar	France	
Otomat/Milas	1977	770 kg (1,700 lb)	210 kg (460 lb)	360 km (190 nmi) (min.)	1,116 km/h (603 kn)	Turbojet	Surface, air	Inertial, GPS, active radar	France/Italy	
Exocet	1975	670 kg (1,480 lb)	165 kg (364 lb)	180 km (97 nmi)	1,134 km/h (612 kn)	Solid propellant (Block 1, block 2), turbojet (Block 3)	Air, surface, submarine	Inertial, active radar	France	Used in combat
AS.37/AJ.168 Martel	1970	550 kg (1,210 lb)	150 kg (330 lb)	60 km (32 nmi)	1,070 km/h (580 kn)	Solid propellant	Air	Passive radar, TV	France/United Kingdom	Used in combat
Malafon	1966	1,330 kg (2,930 lb)	?	13 km (7.0 nmi)	808 km/h (436 kn)	Solid propellant	Ship, surface	MCLOS (radio link)	France	
SS.12/AS.12	1960	76 kg (168 lb)	28 kg (62 lb)	7 km (3.8 nmi)	370 km/h (200 kn)	Solid-fuelled	Air, surface	Wire-guided MCLOS	France	Used in combat
Malaface	1954	1,430 kg (3,150 lb)	700 kg (1,500 lb)	40 km (22 nmi)	808 km/h (436 kn)	Solid propellant	Surface	MCLOS (radio link)	France	
BHT-38	1940	160 kg (350 lb)	?	?	?	None (glide bomb)	Air	MCLOS (radio link)	France	
Sea Eagle	1985	580 kg (1,280 lb)	230 kg (510 lb)	110 km (59 nmi) (min.)	1,000 km/h (540 kn)	Turbojet	Air	Inertial, active radar	United Kingdom	
Sea Skua	1983	145 kg (320 lb)	28 kg (62 lb)	25 km (13 nmi)	950 km/h (510 kn)	Solid fuel	Air	Semi-active radar	United Kingdom	Used in combat
RBS-15	1985	800 kg (1,800 lb)	200 kg (440 lb)	200 km (110 nmi)	1,101 km/h (594 kn)	Turbojet	Air, surface	Inertial, GPS, radar	Sweden	
RB 08	1966	?	?	70 km (38 nmi)	Subsonic	Turbojet	Surface	Radio link active radar	Sweden/France	
RB 04	1962	600 kg (1,300 lb)	300 kg (660 lb)	32 km (17 nmi)	Subsonic	Solid propellant	Air	Active radar	Sweden	
Naval Strike Missile	2009	410 kg (900 lb)	125 kg (276 lb)	250 km (130 nmi)	High subsonic	Turbojet and solid fuel booster	Air, surface	Inertial, GPS, terrain-reference, imaging IR, target database	Norway	
Penguin	1972	385 kg (849 lb)	130 kg (290 lb)	55 km (30 nmi) (min.)	1,468 km/h (793 kn)	Solid propellant	Air, surface, submarine	Inertial, laser, infrarred	Norway	
Fritz X	1943	1,362 kg (3,003 lb)	320 kg (710 lb)	5 km (2.7 nmi)	1,235 km/h (667 kn)	None (glide bomb)	Air	Manual (radio link)	Germany	Used in combat
Henschel Hs 293	1943	1,045 kg (2,304 lb)	295 kg (650 lb)	5 km (2.7 nmi)	828 km/h (447 kn)	Liquid-propellant, then gliding	Air	MCLOS (radio link)	Germany	Used in combat
Blohm & Voss BV 246	1943	730 kg (1,610 lb)	435 kg (959 lb)	210 km (110 nmi)	450 km/h (240 kn)	None (glide bomb)	Air	Manual (radio link)	Germany	
RK-360MC Neptune	2021	870 kg (1,920 lb)	150 kg (330 lb)	300 km (160 nmi)	Subsonic	Turbofan	Ground based TEL	?	Ukraine	Used in combat
BrahMos-II	2030s	?	?	1,000 km (540 nmi); 400 km (220 nmi)(export version)	6,125–8,575 km/h (3,307–4,630 kn)	Scramjet	Ship, surface, air, submarine	?	India/Russia	
BrahMos	2006	2,500 kg (5,500 lb) (air), 3,000 kg (6,600 lb) (ground)	300 kg (660 lb)	800 km (430 nmi) or 290 km (160 nmi)(Export version)	3,675 km/h (1,984 kn)	Ramjet	Ship, surface, air, submarine	INS, SatNav, ARH	India/Russia	
Çakır (missile)	2023	275–330 kg (606–728 lb)	70 kg (150 lb)	150–200 km (81–108 nmi)	919–1,040 km/h (496–562 kn)	Turbojet	Ship, surface, air	Inertial, IIR, RF, Hybrid (IIR+RF)	Turkey	
Atmaca	2017	750 kg (1,650 lb)	220 kg (490 lb)	250 km (130 nmi) +280 km (150 nmi) (KARA Atmaca)	1,042 km/h (563 kn)	Turbojet	Ship, surface, air	Inertial/GPS+RA+DL+IIR	Turkey	
SOM (missile)	2006	600 kg (1,300 lb)	230 kg (510 lb)	SOM-A:250 km (160 mi) SOM-J:185 km (115 mi)	1,153 km/h (623 kn)	Turbojet	Air	Inertial / GPS, terrain referenced navigation, automatic target recognition, imaging infrared	Turkey	
XASM-3	2016	940 kg (2,070 lb)	?	150 km (81 nmi)(original version); 400 km (220 nmi)(extended range)	3,707 km/h (2,002 kn)	Ramjet	Air	Inertial / GPS, mid-course correction, active/passive radar	Japan	
Type 12	2015	700 kg (1,500 lb)	?	200 km (110 nmi)(original version); 400 km (220 nmi)(ship/air-launched and improved version); 900 km (490 nmi)(upgrade in development); 1,500 km (810 nmi)(future version)	?	Turbojet	Ship, TEL, Air	Inertial, GPS, AESA	Japan	
Type 93	1993	530 kg (1,170 lb)	?	170 km (92 nmi)	?	Turbojet	Air	Inertial and IR Image	Japan	
Type 91	1991	510 kg (1,120 lb)	260 kg (570 lb)	150 km (81 nmi)	?	Turbojet	Air	Inertial, mid course correction, active radar	Japan	
Type 80	1982	600 kg (1,300 lb)	150 kg (330 lb)	50 km (27 nmi)	?	Turbojet	Air	Infarred	Japan	
Ohka	1943	2,140 kg (4,720 lb)	1,200 kg (2,600 lb)	36 km (19 nmi)	630 km/h (340 kn)	Solid-propellant	Air	Manned (suicide attack)	Japan	Used in combat
Hsiung Feng III	2007	1,470 kg (3,240 lb)	?	400 km (220 nmi)	3,062 km (1,653 nmi)	Ramjet	Ship, surface, air	Inertial / Active radar	Taiwan	Proven in mishap Hsiung Feng III missile mishap
Hsiung Feng IIE	2011	1,600 kg (3,500 lb)	?	600–2,000 km (320–1,080 nmi)	1,041 km (562 nmi)	Solid-fuel rocket	Ship, surface, air	Inertial/GPS/TERCOM	Taiwan	
Hsiung Feng II	1990	685 kg (1,510 lb)	180 kg (400 lb)	20–250 km (11–135 nmi)	1,041 km (562 nmi)	Solid-fuel rocket	Ship, surface, air	Inertial midflight / Dual active radar plus infrared homing	Taiwan	
Hsiung Feng I	1978-2012	537.5 kg (1,185 lb)	150 kg (330 lb)	40 km (22 nmi)	833 km (450 nmi)	Solid-fuel rocket	Ship, surface, air	Inertial / Radar beam riding plus terminal semi-active homing	Taiwan	
Gabriel	1962	522 kg (1,151 lb)	150 kg (330 lb)	60 km (32 nmi)	840 km/h (450 kn)	Solid-fuel rocket	Air, surface	Active radar	Israel	Used in combat
Sea Breaker	2021	400 kg (880 lb)	113 kg (249 lb)	300 km (160 nmi)	?	Turbojet	Ship, Surface, Air	GPS/INS/TERCOM+IIR	Israel	
Hae Sung-I (SSM-700K)	2005	718 kg (1,583 lb)	300 kg (660 lb)	150 km (81 nmi)	1,013 km/h (547 kn)	Turbojet	Ship, surface	Inertial, active radar	South Korea	
Noor	2005	750 kg (1,650 lb)	165 kg (364 lb)	30–220 km (16–119 nmi)	1,110–1,728 km/h (599–933 kn)	Turbojet engine	Air, Surface, Ship	Inertial, Active radar homing	Iran	Used in combat
Zafar	2012	120 kg (260 lb)	30 kg (66 lb)	25 km (13 nmi)	0.8 M	Turbojet	Surface, Ship	Active radar	Iran	
P15 & Silkworm KN1	?	?	?	?	?	Turbofan	Surface, coastal	Inertial, active radar	North Korea/USSR/Russia	
MANSUP	2009	380 kg (840 lb)	150 kg (330 lb)	74–100 km (40–54 nmi)	870 km/h (470 kn)	Solid-fuel rocket	Ship, surface	Inertial, active radar	Brazil	
MANSUP-ER	2023	380 kg (840 lb)	150 kg (330 lb)	200 km (110 nmi)	950 km/h (510 kn)	Turbofan	Ship, surface	Inertial, active radar	Brazil	
NASM-SR	Expected for 2024	375 kg (827 lb)	100 kg (220 lb)	55 km (30 nmi)	980 km/h (530 kn)	Solid-fuel rocket	Air	INS, SatNav, IIR	India	
NASM-MR	Expected for 2025	750 kg (1,650 lb)	150 kg (330 lb)	150–250 km (81–135 nmi)	980 km/h (530 kn)	Solid-fuel rocket	Air	INS, SatNav, IIR	India	
LR-AShCM	2023	1,450 kg (3,200 lb)	200–300 kg (440–660 lb)	1,000 km (540 nmi)	1,110 km/h (600 kn)	Turbofan	Ship, Surface, Air, Submarine	INS, SatNav, Hybrid (ARH, EO + IIR)	India	
LRAShM	?	?	?	>1,500 km (810 nmi)	>Mach 8 (5,300 kn)	Solid-fuel rocket	Ship, Surface	?	India	
