= Yung Feng-class minehunter =

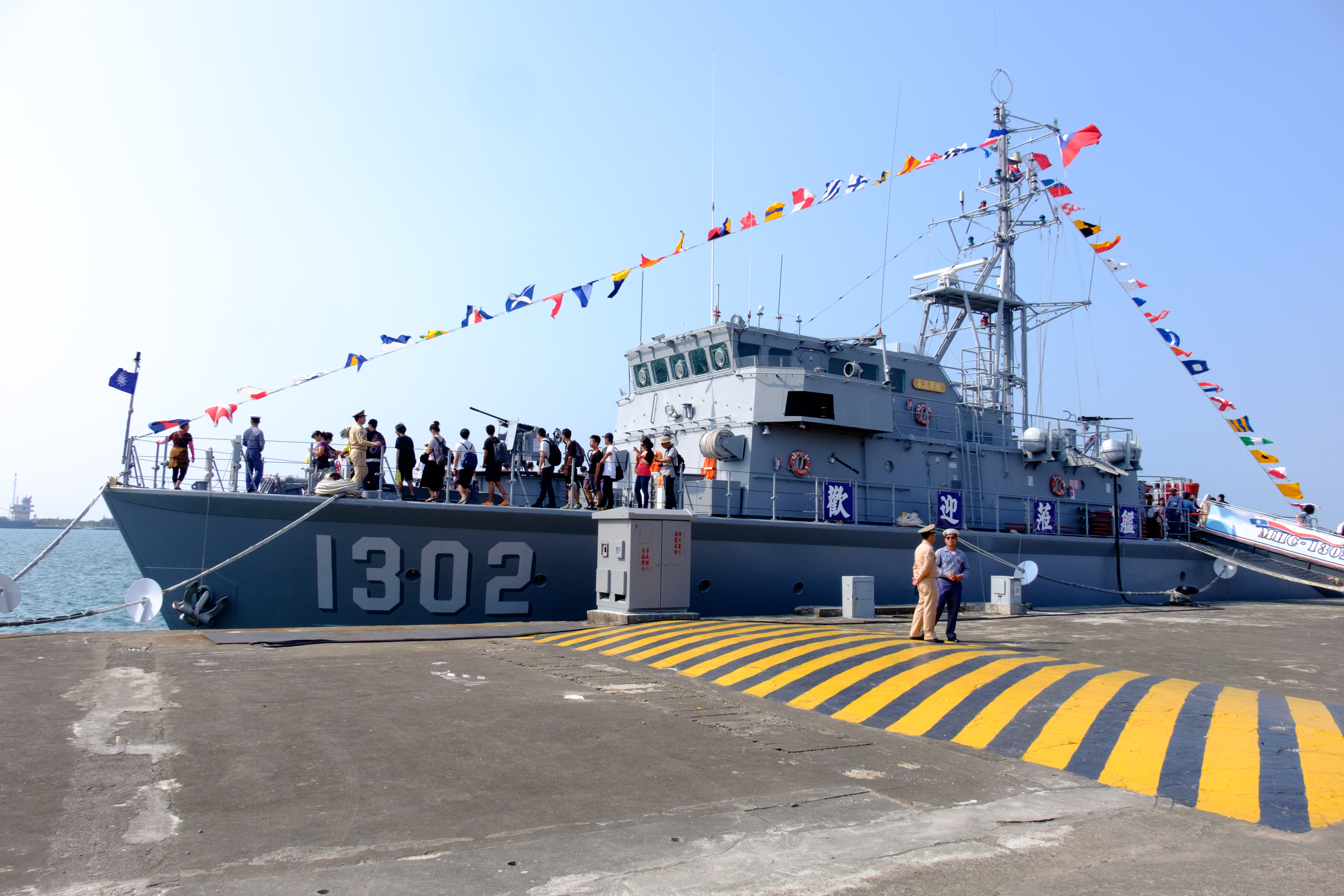
ROCN Yung Chia (MHC-1302) Shipped at No.7 East Pier, Zuoying Naval Base

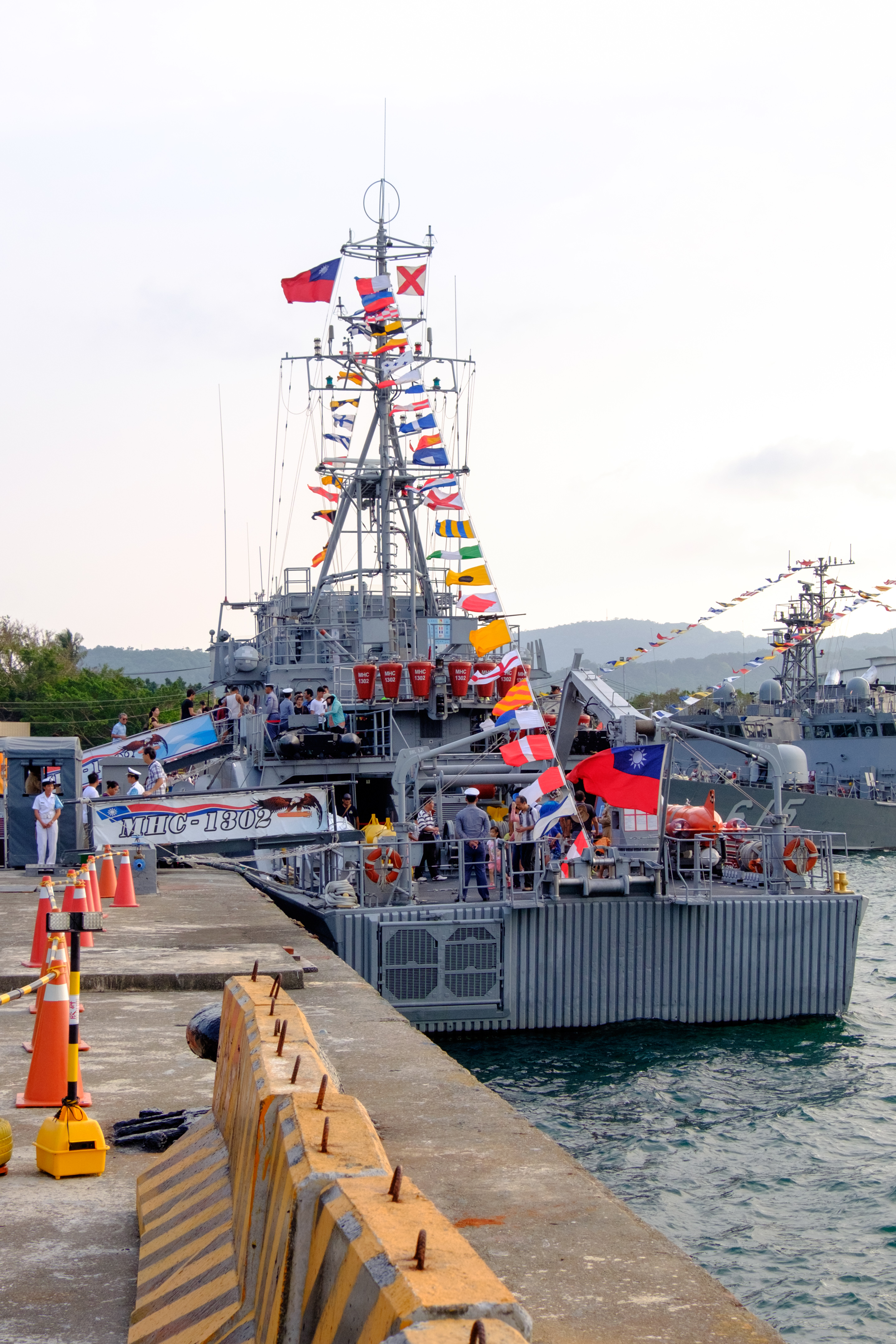
Rear View of ROCN Yung Chia (MHC-1302) Shipped at No.7 East Pier, Zuoying Naval Base

The Yung Feng class (Chinese: 永豐) are a series of coastal minehunters designed to find, identify, and destroy moored and bottom naval mines. They were built in Germany by Abeking & Rasmussen for the Republic of China Navy.

== Description ==
The Yung Feng class can conduct both mine hunting and mine sweeping operations. They were built in Germany by Abeking & Rasmussen for the Republic of China Navy.

== History ==
The Yung Feng-class minehunters were commissioned into service in 1991. Alternatively the Naval War College Review contends that while the vessels were delivered in 1991 they were not commissioned until 1995. The namesake for the class are the four coastal defense ship of the Yongfeng class which were launched in 1910.

== Vessels ==
- ROCS Yung Feng (MHC-1301)
- ROCS Yung Chia (MHC-1302)
- ROCS Yung Nien (MHC-1303)
- ROCS Yung Shun (MHC-1305)
