= Zuoying Naval Base =

Naval base in Kaohsiung, Taiwan

Coordinates: 22°42′16″N 120°16′48″E

Zuoying Naval Base in Kaohsiung hosts the Zuoying Naval Airfield and the Zuoying Naval Yard (海軍左營基地), it is the Republic of China Navy's largest naval base. The Republic of China Marine Corps host their training program for their Amphibious Reconnaissance and Patrol Unit (ARP) at that location.

== History ==
In the early days Japan chose Magong as the site for the construction of a major naval headquarters, and forced the residents to relocate to other places. In 1943, the command center of the Garrison Office was moved to Kaohsiung's Zuoying. The Magong facilities were heavily damaged in the Penghu air raids.

On 1 July 2016, a Hsiung Feng III missile was accidentally launched from a Republic of China Navy vessel from waters off Kaohsiung towards Penghu. The missile hit a fishing boat at 8:40 a.m., killing one person and injuring three. This accident is known as the Hsiung Feng III missile mishap.

In 2017 the government embarked on a major expansion of the naval base. Under the name Weihai Project (威海) the expansion was given a budget of more than a billion US dollars.

In 2024 a Ching Chiang-class patrol ship got stranded on a sandbar off Zuoying Naval Base but was able to dislodge itself a few hours later.

In 2025 the Taiwanese government signed a deal with the US government to conduct training at Zuoying Naval Base.

== Republic of China Naval Academy ==
The Republic of China Naval Academy (CNA; Chinese: 中華民國海軍軍官學校; pinyin: Zhōnghuámínguó Hǎijūn Jūnguān Xuéxiào; Pe̍h-ōe-jī: Tiong-hôa Bîn-kok Hái-kun Kun-koaⁿ Ha̍k-hāu) is the naval service academy of the Republic of China (Taiwan), located adjacent to the Zuoying Naval Base (海軍左營基地), Kaohsiung, Taiwan.

== Military dependents' villages ==
Military dependents' villages near the naval base are composed of single-story houses, uncommon in most Taiwanese cities. The villages were first populated by soldiers of the Kuomintang who came from different provinces of mainland China and gathered here after losing the Chinese Civil War in 1949. The ROC National Government provided these veteran serviceman with these single-story houses. These residential areas belonged to the navy and were under military control at that time. Therefore, people outside could not enter villages without martial permission. Without interference from outside, the culture of villages embodies that of different provinces of mainland China.

== Gallery ==
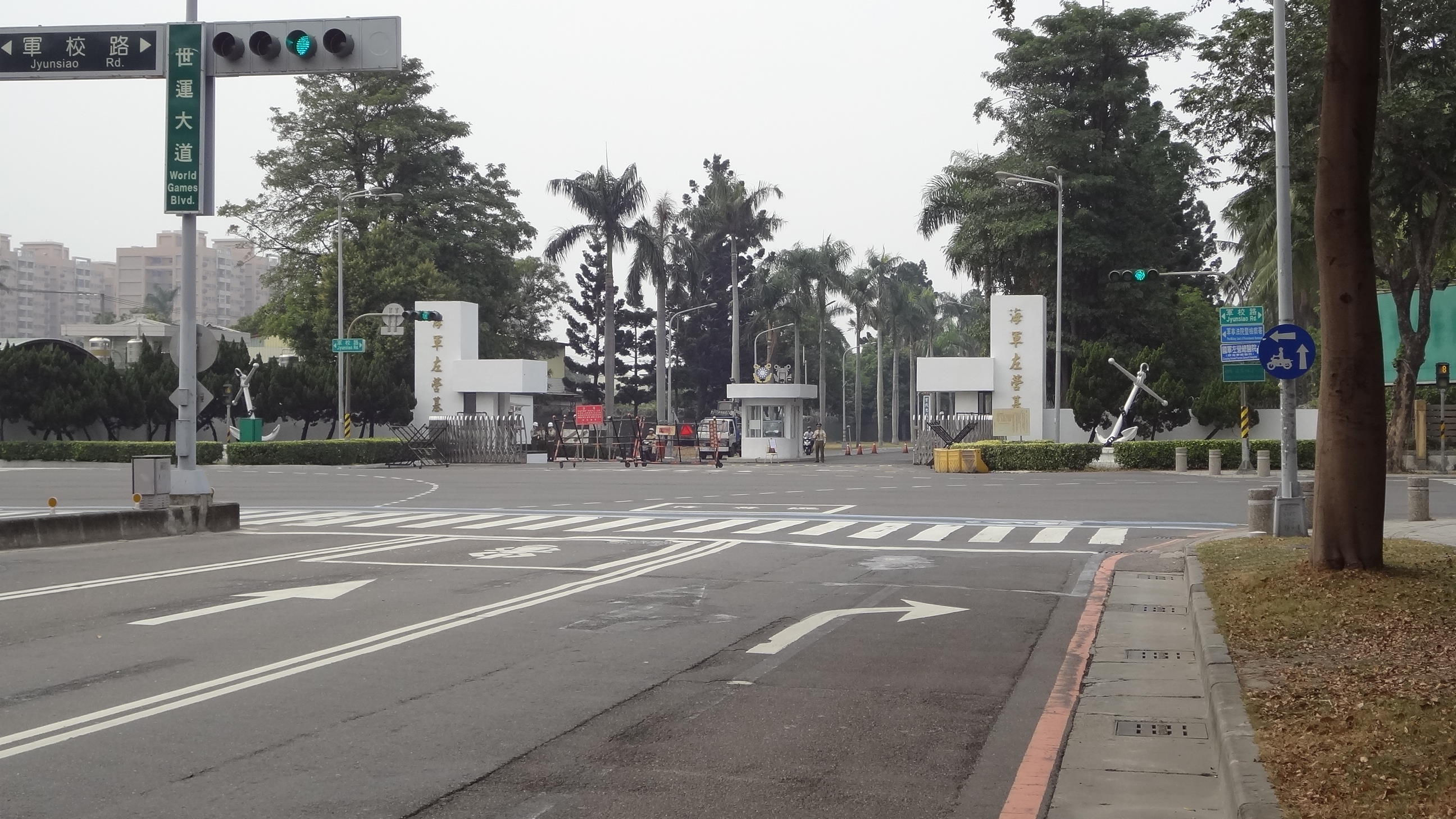
Zuoying Naval Base gate

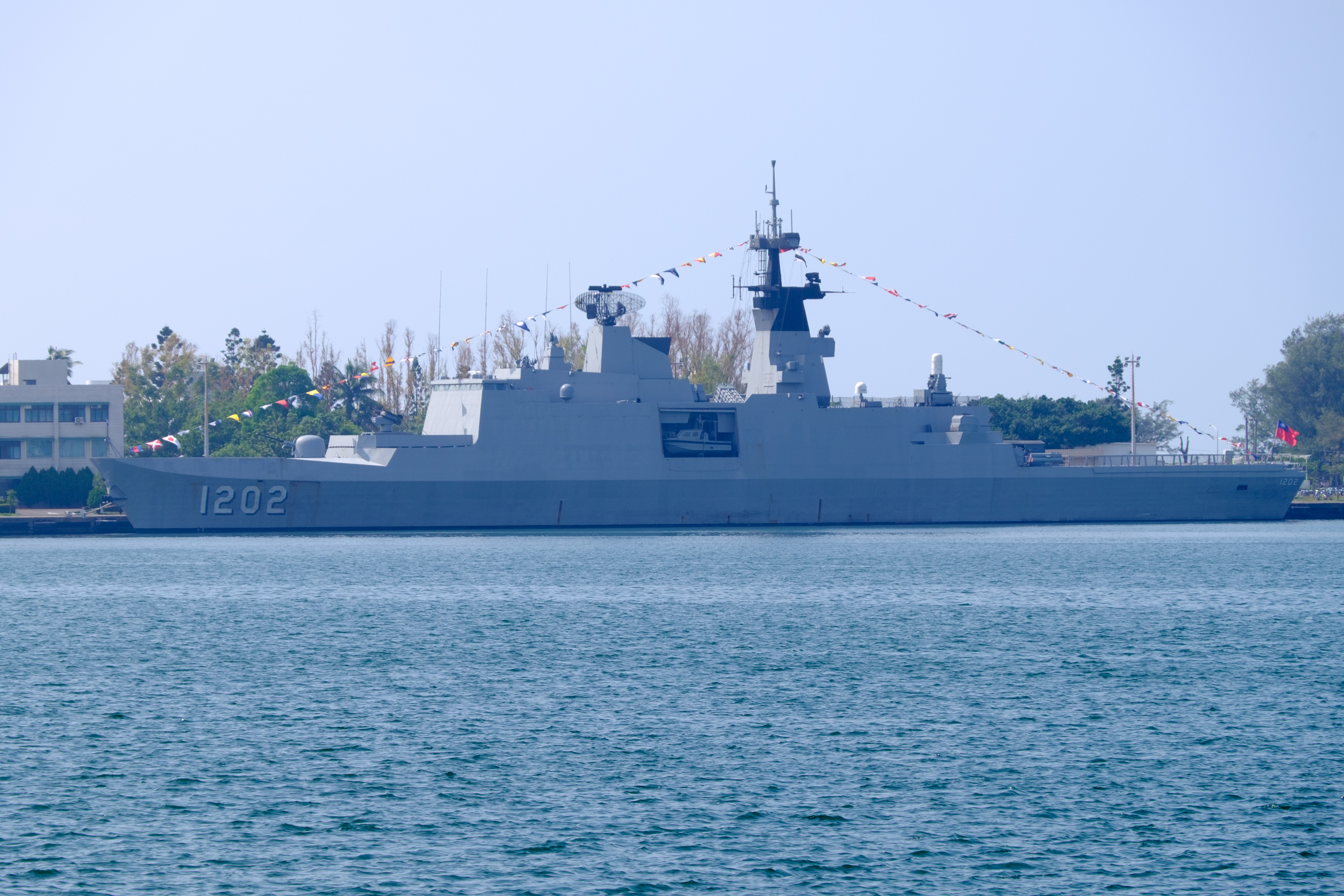
ROCS Kang Ding at Zuoying Naval Base on 24 October 2015.

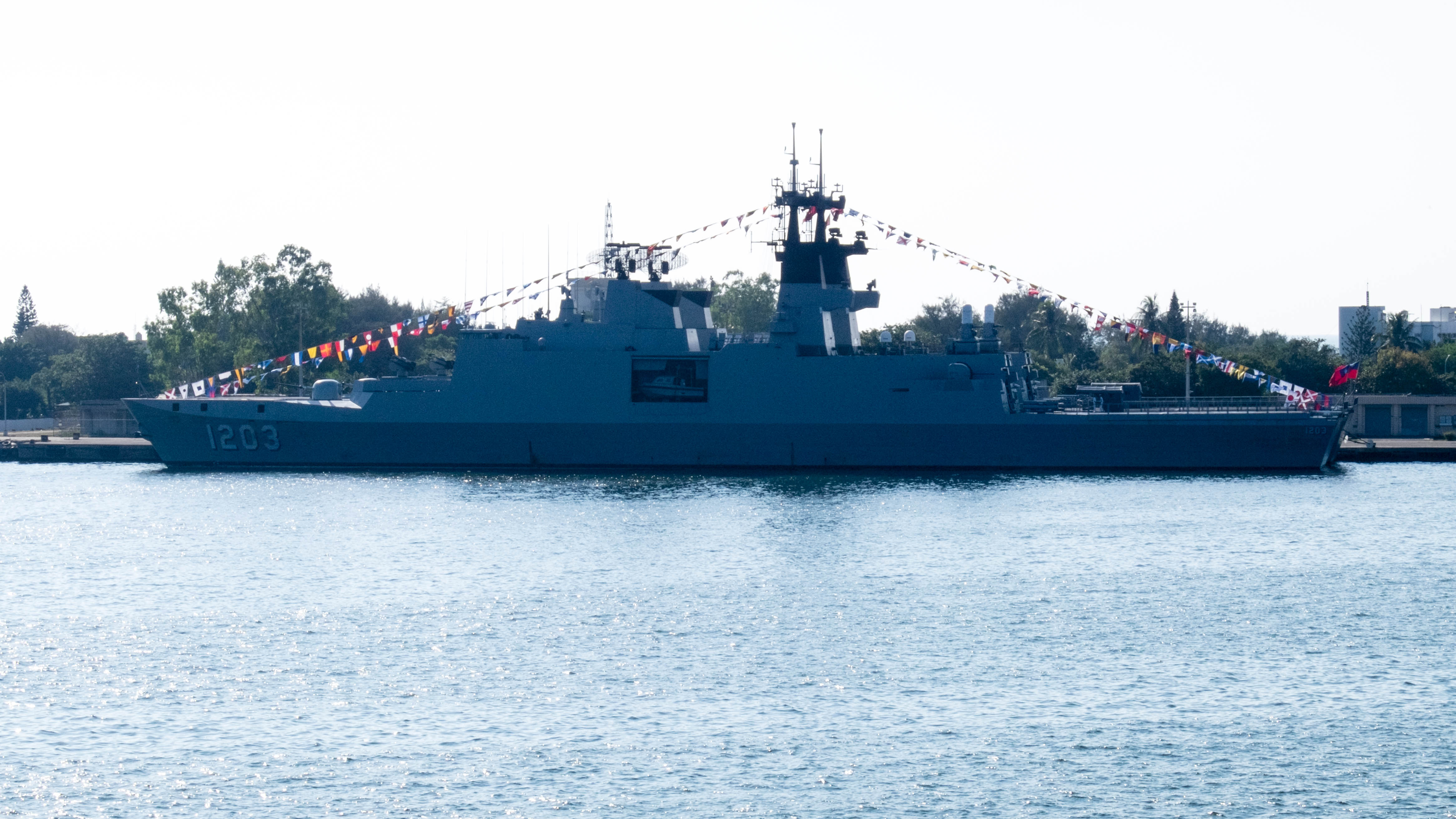
ROCS Si Ning (PFG-1203) and ROCN Kun Ming (PFG-1205) at Zuoying

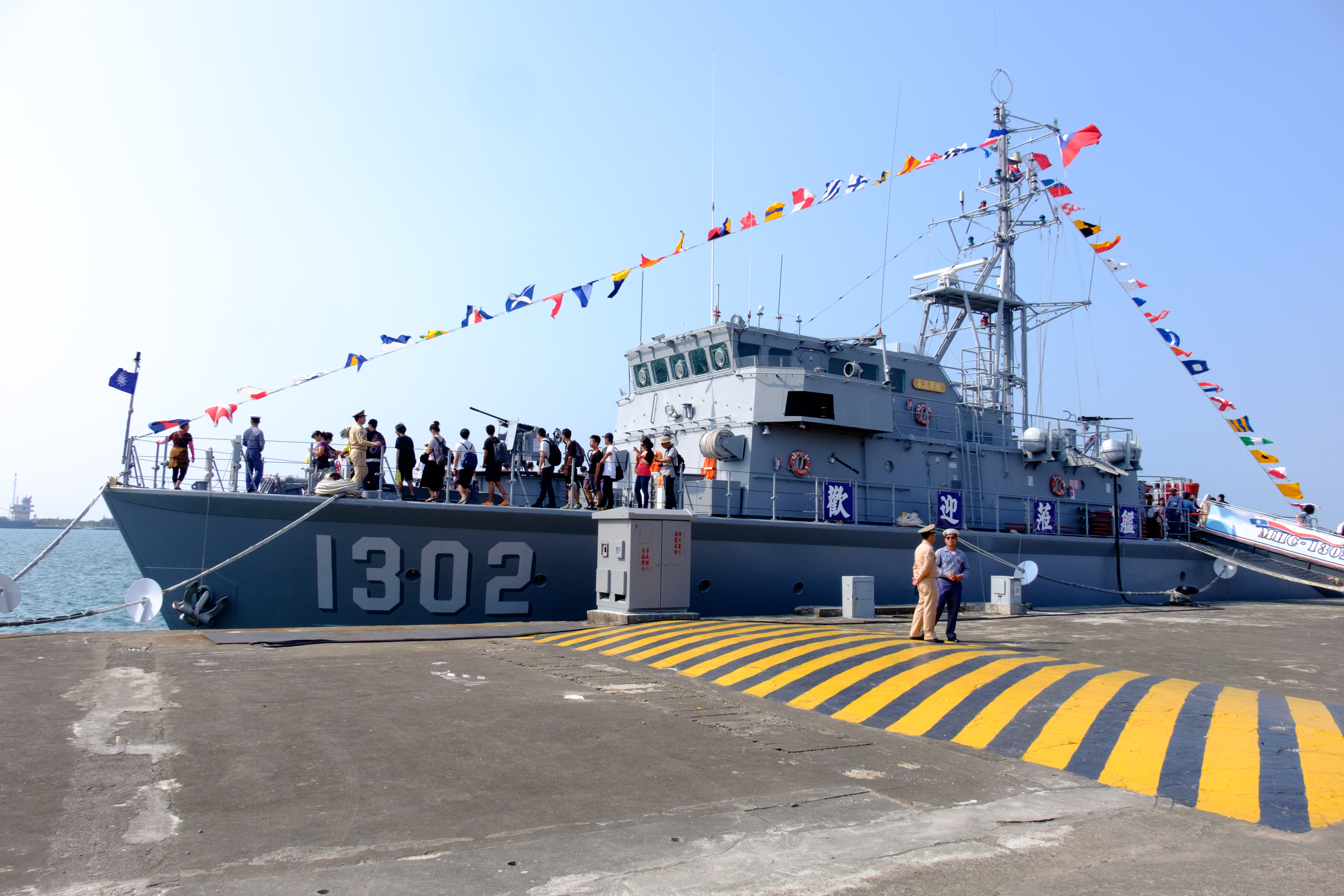
ROCN Yung Chia (MHC-1302) Shipped at No.7 East Pier

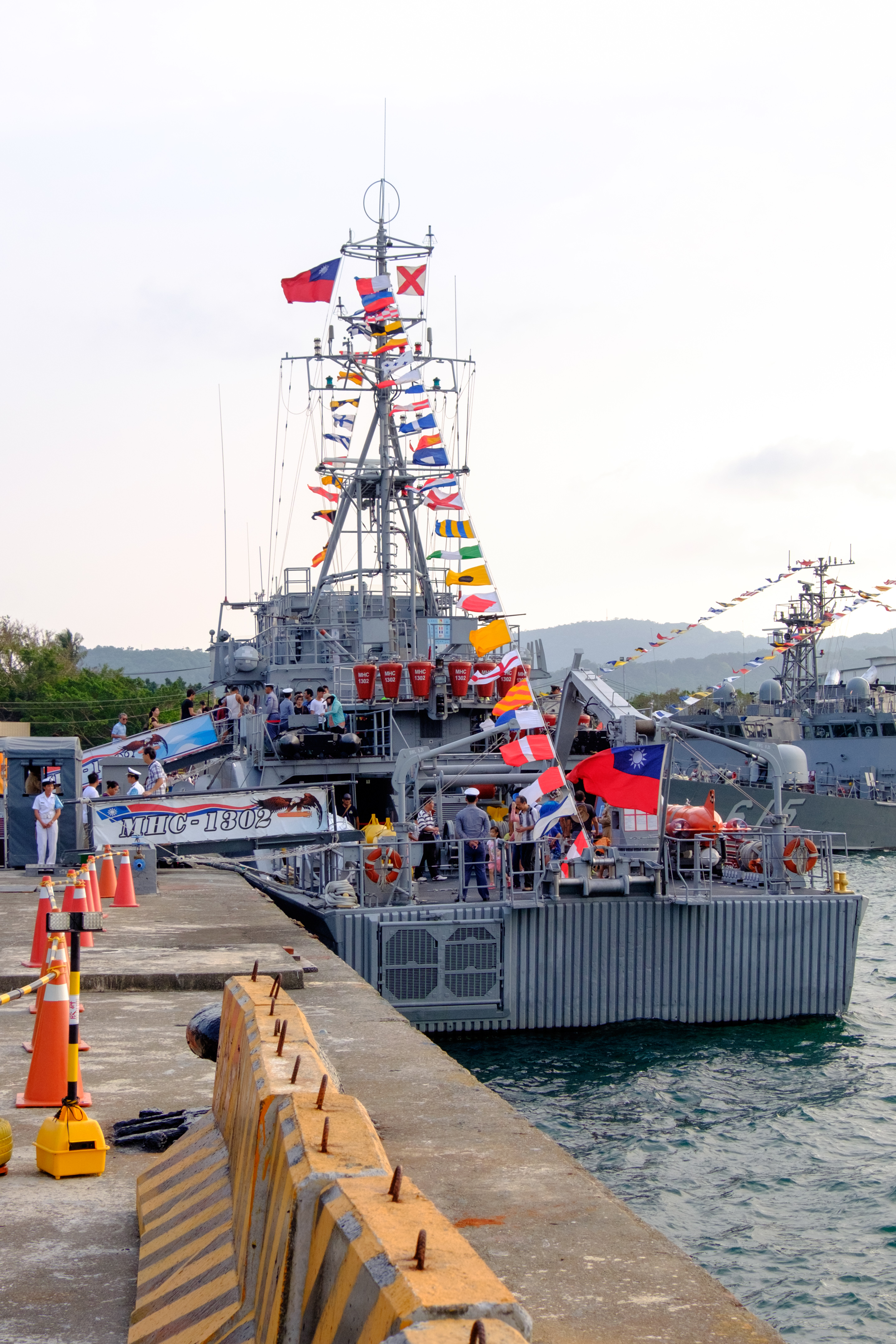
Rear View of ROCN Yung Chia (MHC-1302) Shipped at No.7 East Pier

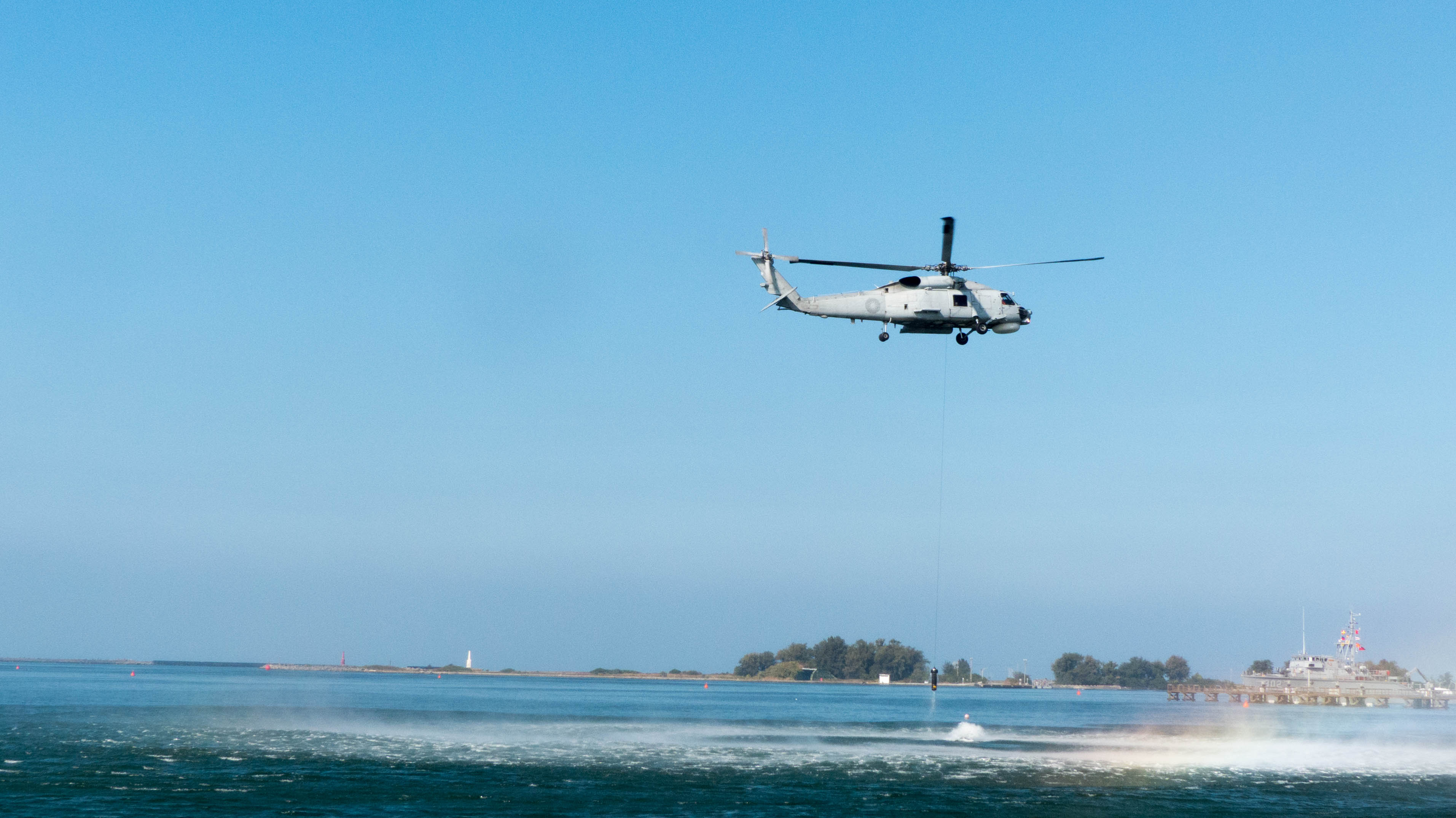
Republic of China Navy S-70C dropping a sonobuoy at Zuoying

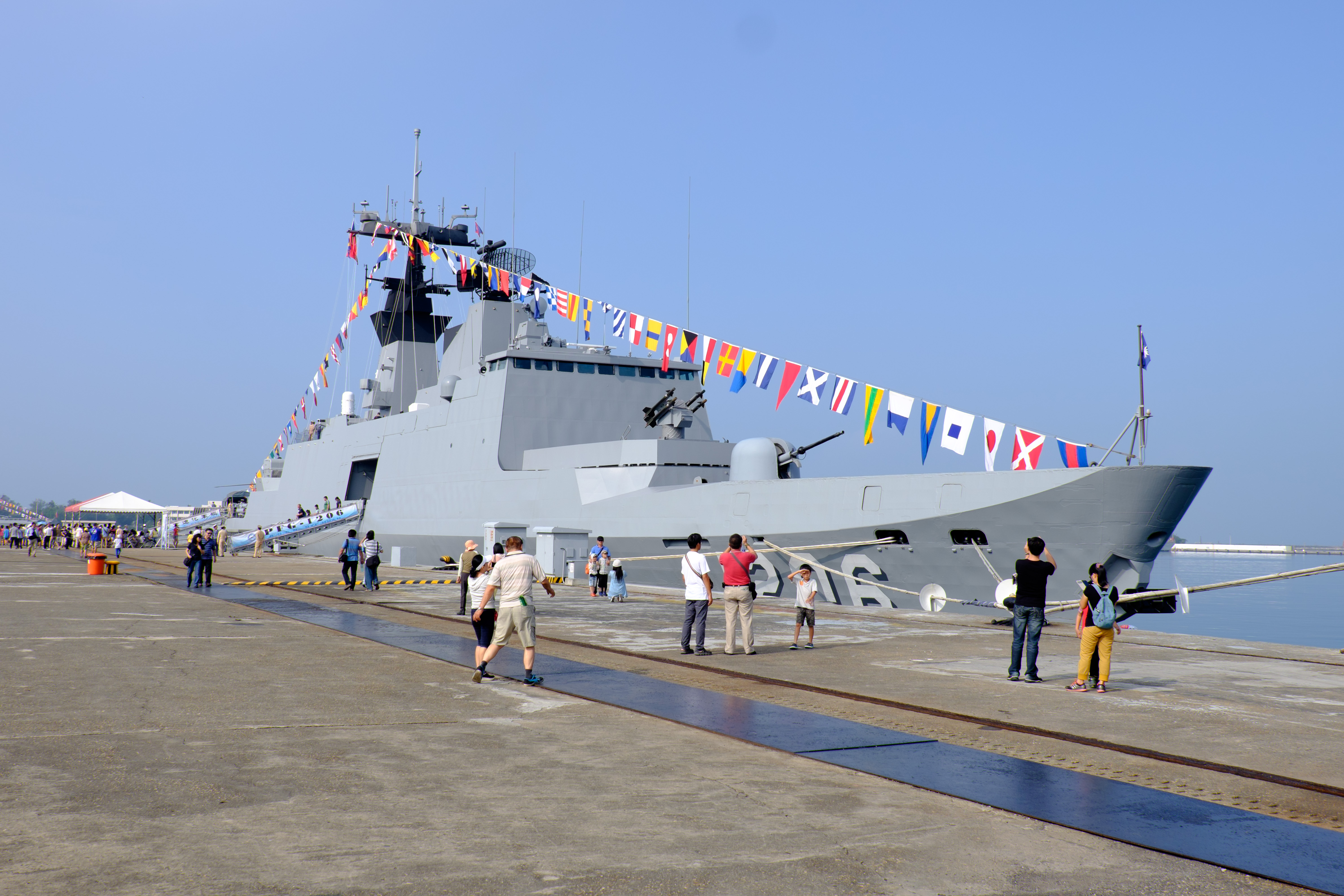
ROCS Di Hua at Zuoying

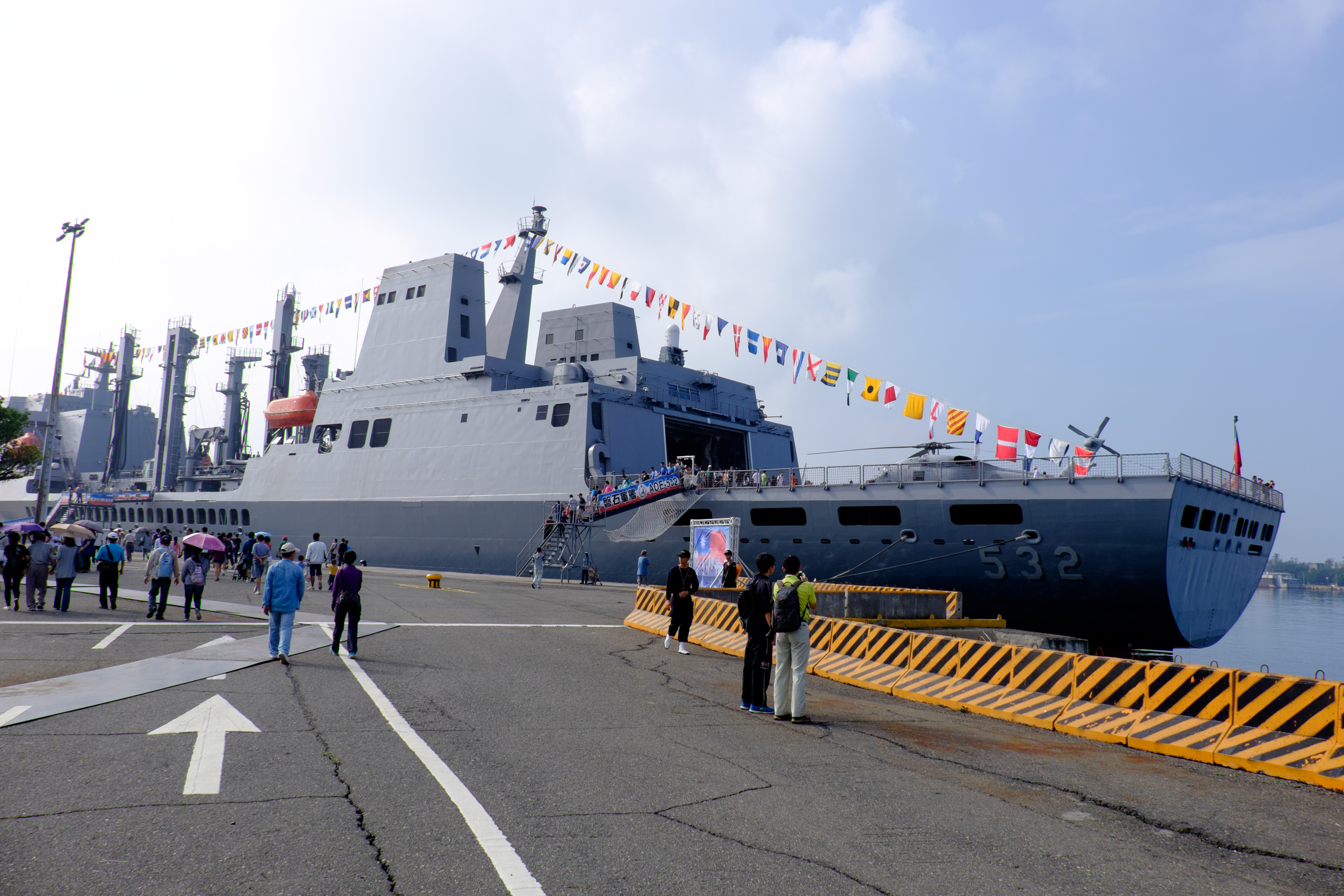
ROCN Panshih (AOE-532) shipped at No.3 East Pier

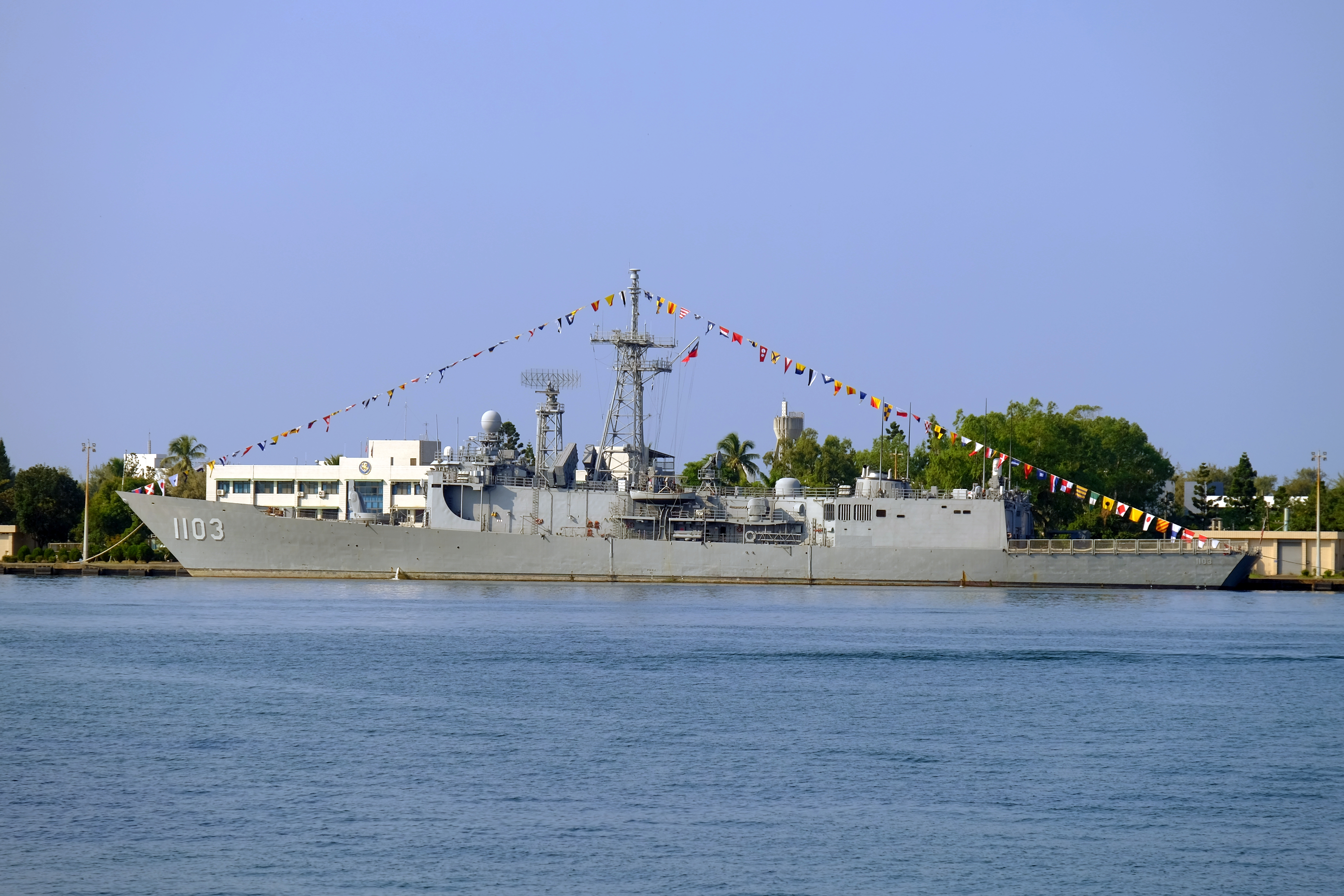
ROCS Cheng Ho at Zuoying

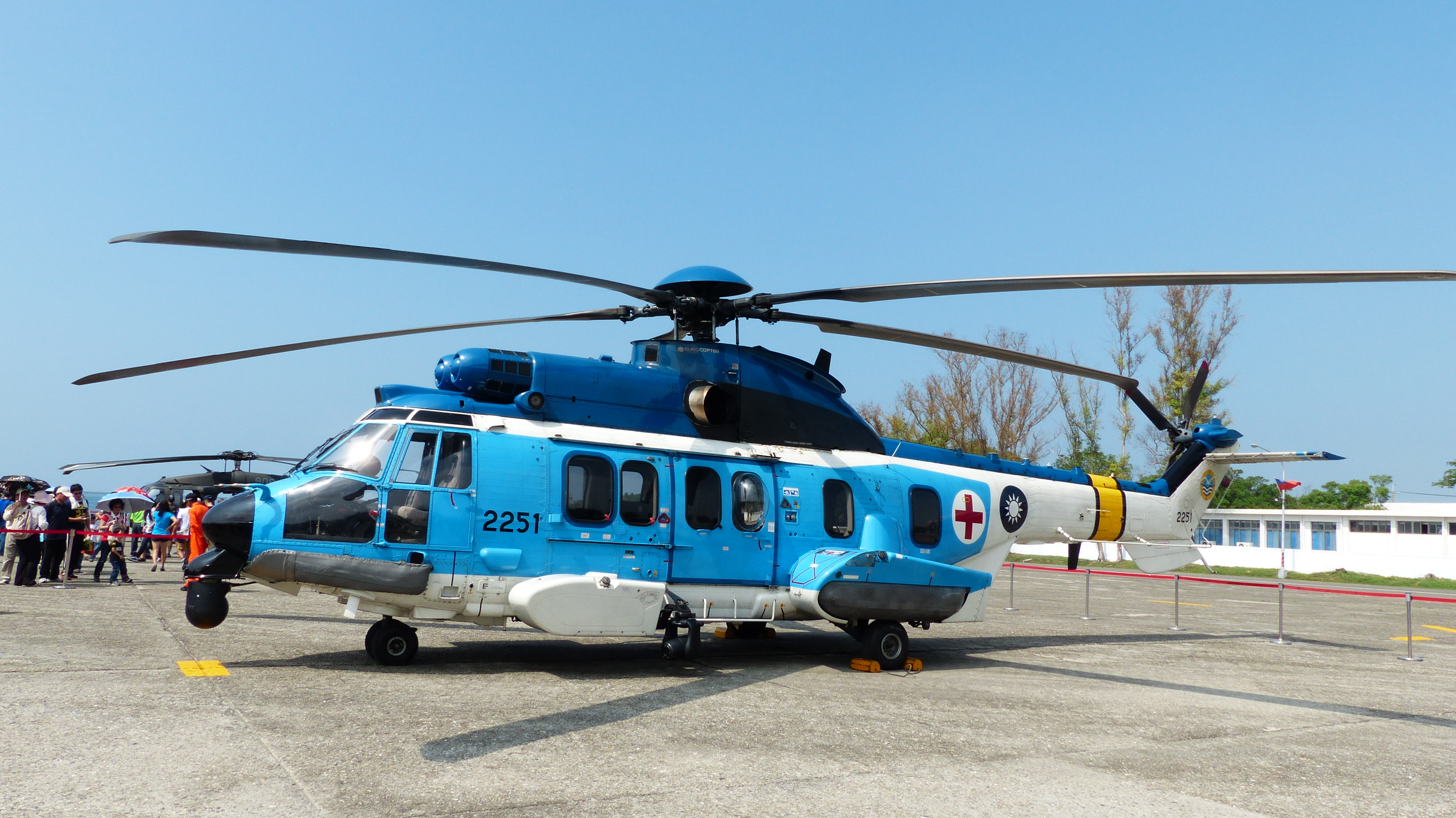
ROCAF Eurocopter EC225 Super Puma on display at Zuoying

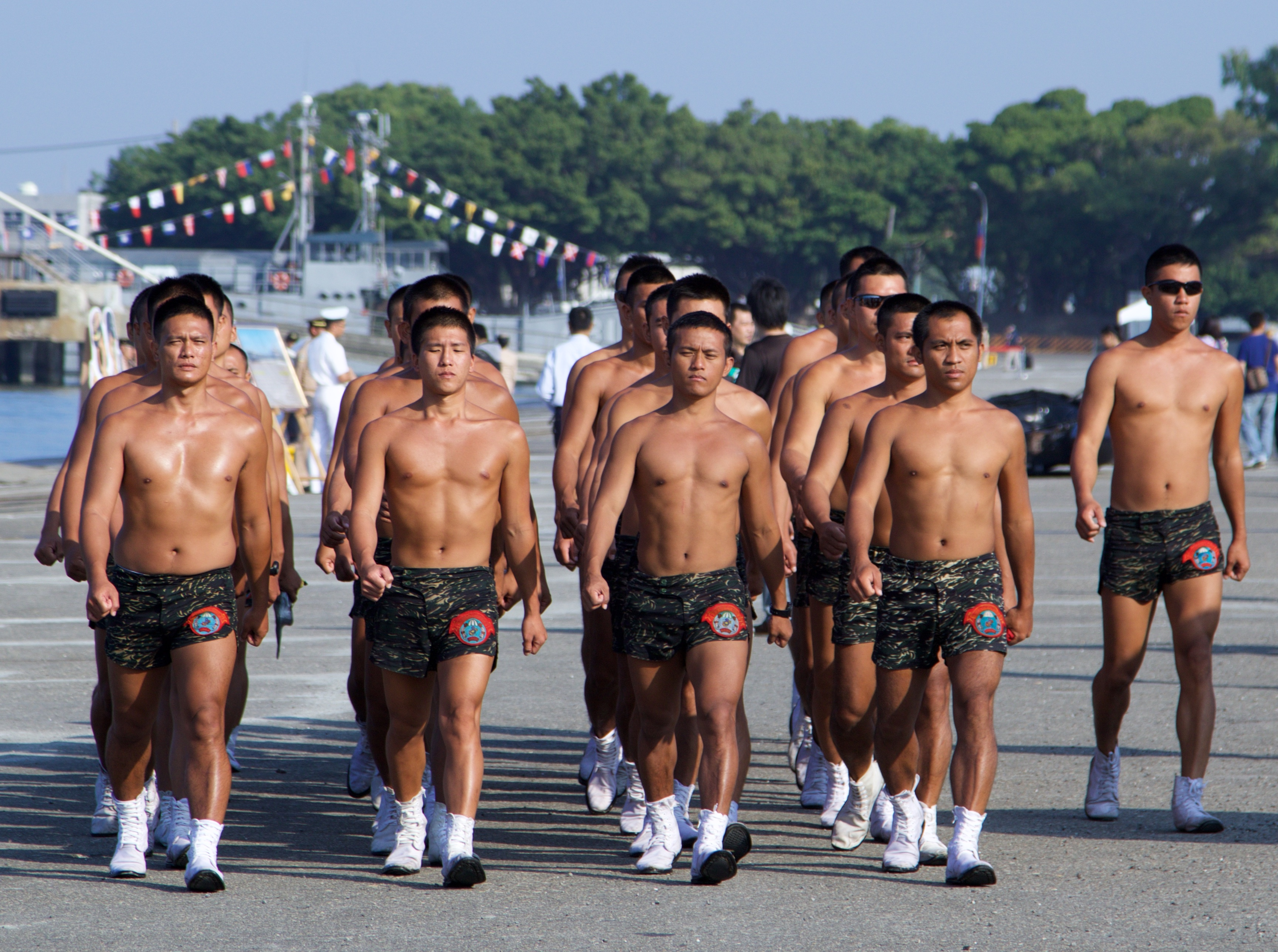
Amphibious Reconnaissance and Patrol Unit members in 2015

== See also ==
- Mako Guard District
- Battle of Dongshan
