= 1982 Harpoon missile misfire incident =

1982 Danish naval accident

Coordinates: 55°55′57″N 11°31′51″E

- Date: 6 September 1982
- Location: Lumsås, Zealand, Denmark
- Cause: Technical malfunction
- Perpetrator: Royal Danish Navy
- Property damage: 4 cottages destroyed, minor damage to other buildings

The 1982 Harpoon missile misfire incident, in Danish dubbed hovsa-missilet ('The Whoopsie Missile'), was an unintentional discharge of a live Harpoon missile by Danish frigate HDMS Peder Skram during a training maneuver in the Kattegat on 6 September 1982. The missile traveled 34 kilometers at low altitude, severing several power lines before eventually striking a group of trees and exploding. The fireball and subsequent shockwave destroyed four nearby unoccupied summer cottages and caused minor damage to a further 130 buildings in the area. There were no injuries.

== Cause ==
A navy investigation into the matter concluded that a technical malfunction was the cause of the launch as it happened without the launch key being activated. The missile system had undergone maintenance and was in the process of being checked by an expert from the Navy Material Command, who was later charged and convicted for negligence, though most charges were later dropped following a second investigation. McDonnell Douglas, the manufacturer of the missile later paid the Danish government compensation, which covered all the damage made by the missile. It was applied a termination clause like the ones which in 1999 became a recommended standard for contracts valued at less than $100K.

== See also ==
- The USS Coontz was involved in a similar incident in 1981.
- Hsiung Feng III missile mishap
