= Hsiung Feng III missile mishap =

Naval accident in Penghu, Taiwan

Hsiung Feng III missile mishap 雄風三型反艦飛彈誤射事件
- Date: 1 July 2016
- Time: 8:40 a.m.
- Location: Off Dongji Island, Wangan Township, Penghu County, Taiwan
- Participants: Taiwan
- Deaths: 1
- Injuries: 3

On 1 July 2016, a Hsiung Feng III missile was accidentally launched from a Republic of China Navy vessel from waters off Kaohsiung towards Penghu. The missile hit a fishing boat at 8:40 a.m., killing one person and injuring three.

== Chronology ==
The Chin Chiang PGG-610 (Chinese: 金江號) patrol ship was undergoing a regular simulation training exercise for military equipment on the morning of 1 July (Friday) at Zuoying Naval Base in Zuoying District, Kaohsiung. The missile was accidentally launched at 8:00 a.m. during an inspection at the navy base. The missile cruised around 75 kilometres (47 mi) for two minutes towards China before hitting a Taiwanese fishing boat. The missile did not explode upon impact. The navy sent a helicopter and navy vessels to the area for damage inspection.

The mishap killed the Taiwanese boat's captain and injured its three crew members, from Taiwan, the Philippines and Vietnam.

The missile did not cross the median line of the Taiwan Strait, which separates Taiwan and China.

An investigation of the incident concluded in August 2016. Three ROC naval officers were charged by the Kaohsiung District Prosecutors Office. The Ministry of Justice announced in November that the family of captain Huang Wen-chung would be paid NT$34.84 million in compensation. The Control Yuan voted against impeachment proceedings for nine naval officers in July 2017. The Kaohsiung District Court issued its first ruling on the case that September, sentencing Petty Officer Second Class Kao Chia-chun to eighteen months imprisonment, Chief Petty Officer Chen Ming-hsiu to 24 months imprisonment, and Lieutenant Junior Grade Hsu Po-wei to fourteen months imprisonment. The Control Yuan held a second vote and began impeachment proceedings against nine naval officers in February 2018. The next month, the Control Yuan advised that communication between the Executive Yuan and Ministry of National Defense be improved. The Kaohsiung bench of the Taiwan High Court reduced Chen Ming-hsiu's sentence to 21 months in June 2018.

== See also ==
- 1982 Harpoon missile misfire incident
- Zuoying Naval Base
