= Exocet =

French anti-ship missile

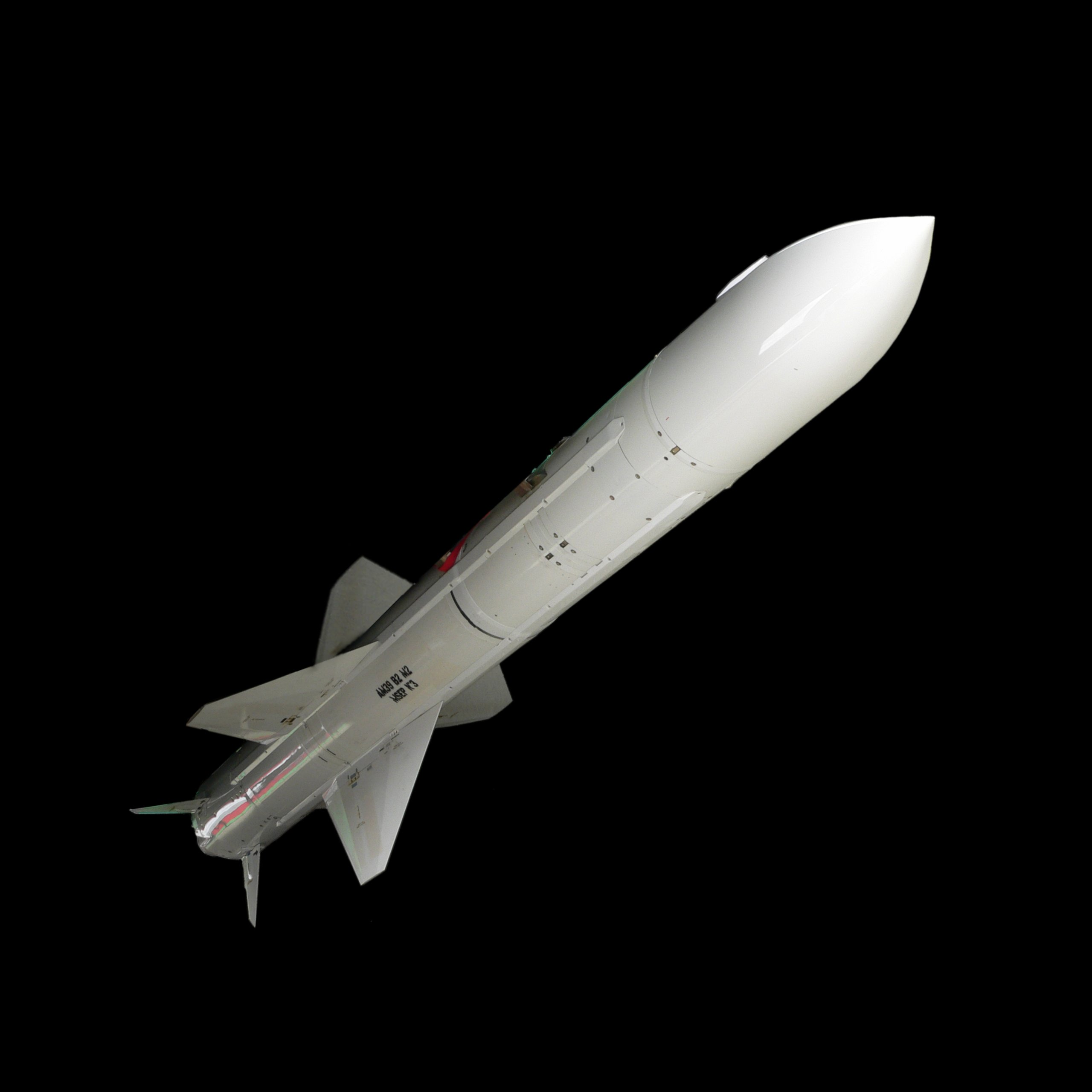
- AM39
- Type: Anti-ship cruise missile
- Place of origin: France

Service history
- In service: 1975–present
- Used by: See operators
- Wars: Iran–Iraq War; Falklands War

Production history
- Designer: 1967–1970: Nord Aviation; 1970–1974: Aérospatiale
- Designed: 1967
- Manufacturer: 1979–1999: Aérospatiale; 1999–2001: Aérospatiale-Matra; 2001–present: MBDA France
- Produced: 1974

Specifications
- Mass: 780 kg (1,720 lb)
- Length: 6 m (19 ft 8 in)
- Diameter: 34.8 cm (1 ft 1.7 in)
- Wingspan: 1.35 m (4 ft 5 in)
- Warhead: 165 kg (364 lb)
- Engine: Solid propellant engine Turbojet (MM40 Block 3 version)
- Operational range: MM38 surface-launched: around 40 km (25 mi; 22 nmi); AM39 air-launched: maximum range around 70 km (43 mi; 38 nmi); SM39 submarine-launched: 50 km (31 mi; 27 nmi); MM40 Block 3 surface-launched, Exocet Mobile Coastal: "200 km (120 mi; 110 nmi) class"
- Flight altitude: Sea-skimming
- Maximum speed: Mach 0.93; 1,148 km/h (713 mph; 620 kn)
- Guidance system: Inertial guidance, active radar homing, and GPS guidance
- Launch platform: Multi-platform: MM38 surface-launched; AM39 air-launched; SM39 submarine-launched; MM40 surface-launched

The Exocet (French pronunciation: [ɛɡzɔsɛt]) is a French-built anti-ship cruise missile whose various versions can be launched from surface vessels, submarines, helicopters and fixed-wing aircraft.

== Name ==
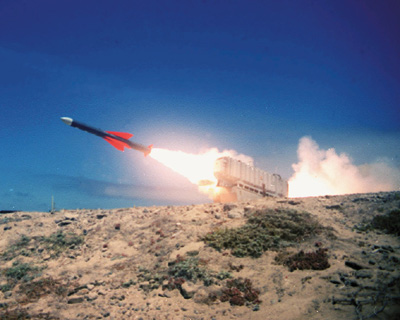
Exocet missile launch

The missile's name was given by Jean Guillot, then the technical director at Nord Aviation. It is the French word for flying fish, from the Latin exocoetus used for a "fish that sleeps on the shore" and itself from the Greek exṓkoitos (ἐξώκοιτος) in Hesychius of Alexandria, meaning "out-bed" or more loosely "out-sleeping".

== Description ==
Exocet impact

The Exocet is built by MBDA, a European missile company. Development began in 1967 by Nord as a ship-launched weapon named the MM38. A few years later, Aerospatiale and Nord merged. The basic body design was based on the Nord AS-30 air-to-ground tactical missile. The sea-launched MM38 entered service in 1975, whilst the air-launched AM39 Exocet began development in 1974 and entered service with the French Navy five years later in 1979.

The relatively compact sea skimming missile is designed for attacking small- to medium-size warships (e.g., frigates, corvettes, and destroyers), although multiple hits are effective against larger vessels, such as aircraft carriers. It is guided inertially in mid-flight and activates active radar homing late in its flight to find and hit its target. As a countermeasure against air defence around the target, it maintains a very low altitude while inbound, staying just one to two meters above the sea surface. Due to the effect of the radar horizon, this means that the target may not detect an incoming attack until the missile is only 6 kilometres (3.7 mi) from impact. Leaving little time for reaction, this stimulated the design of close-in weapon systems (CIWS).

Its solid propellant rocket motor gives the Exocet a maximum range of 70 kilometres (43 mi; 38 nmi). It was replaced on the Block 3 MM40 ship-launched version of the missile with a solid propellant booster and a turbojet sustainer engine, which extends the range of the missile to more than 180 kilometres (110 mi; 97 nmi). The submarine-launched version places the missile inside a launch capsule.

In 2017 the UK and France began work on the Stratus (missile family) as a replacement for the Exocet.

=== Versions ===
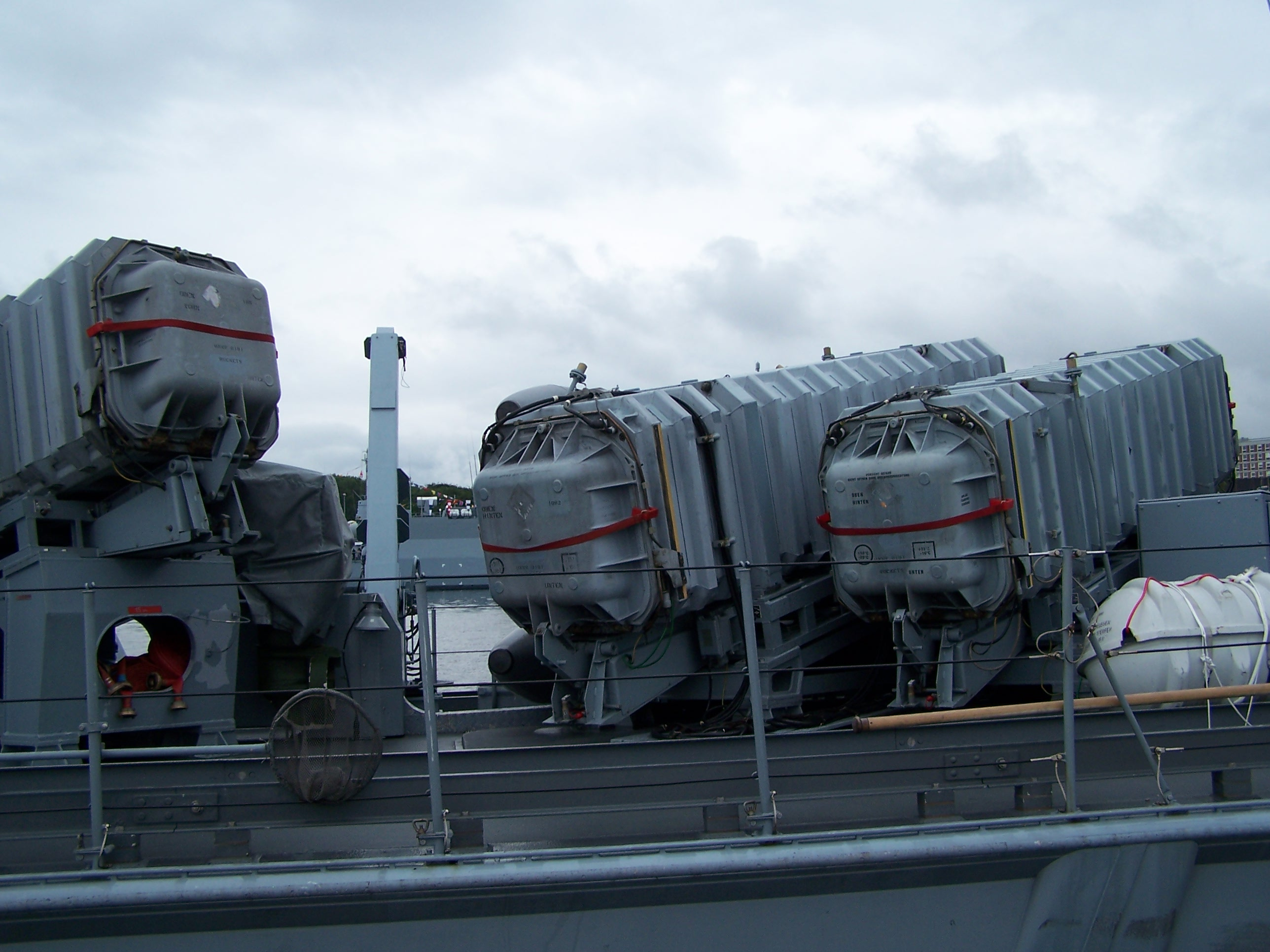
MM38 onboard German Navy Type 143A Gepard-class fast attack craft Nerz

The Exocet has been manufactured in versions including:

- MM38 (surface-launched) – deployed on warships. Range: 42 km. No longer produced. A coast defence version known as "Excalibur" was developed in the United Kingdom and deployed in Gibraltar from 1985 to 1997.
- AM38 (helicopter-launched – tested only)

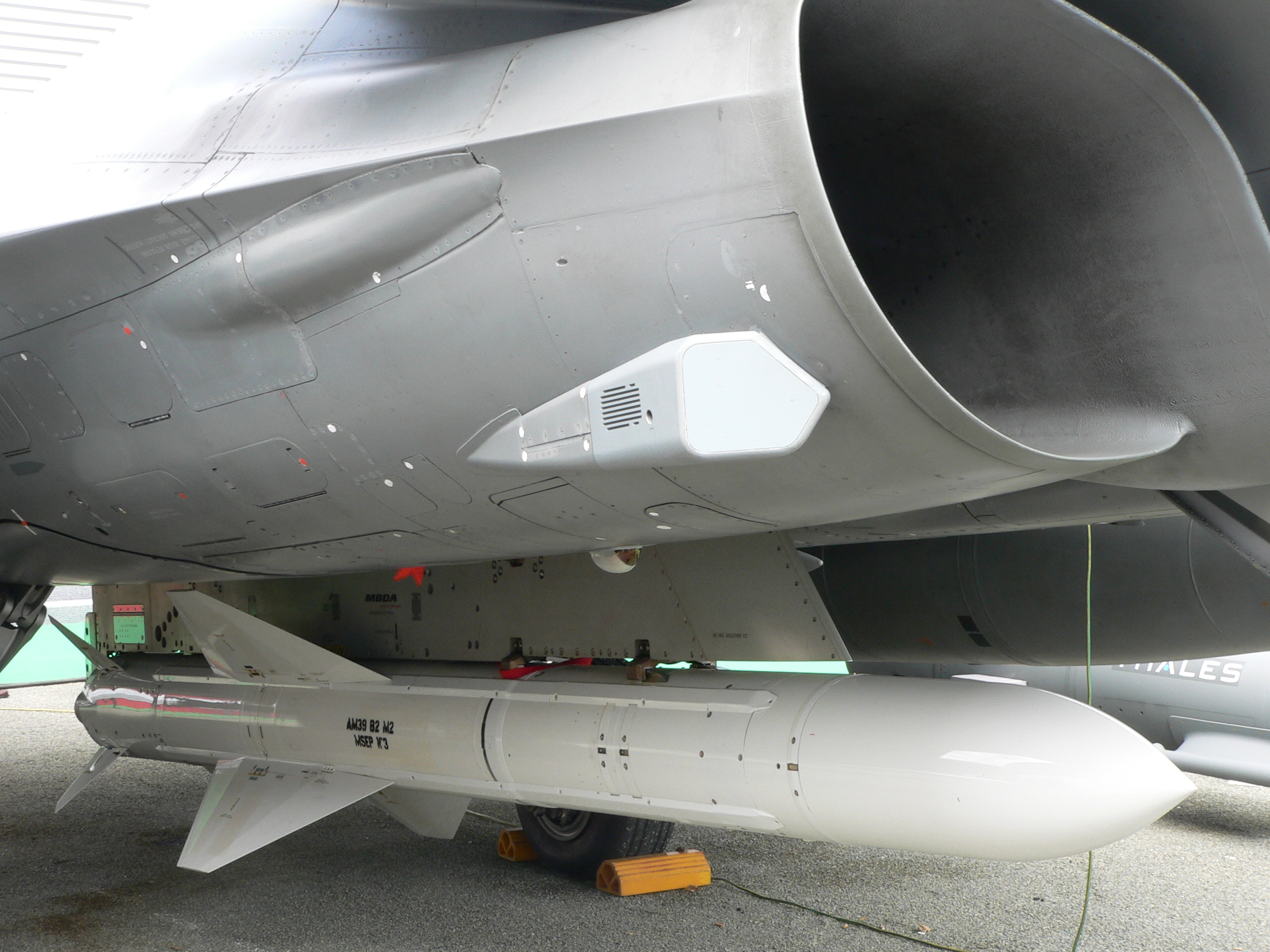
AM39 under a Dassault Rafale.

- AM39 (air-launched) – B2 Mod 2: deployed on 14 types of aircraft (combat jets, maritime patrol aircraft, helicopters). Range between 50 and 70 km, depending on the altitude and the speed of the launch aircraft.

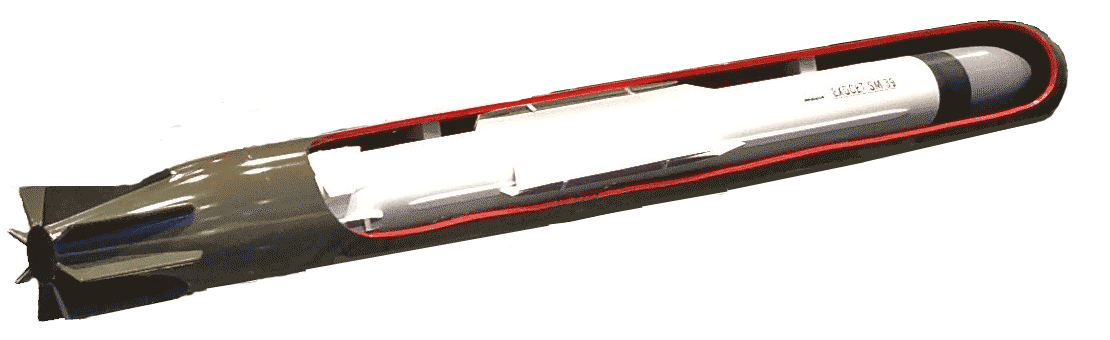
SM39 encapsulated, which allows a standard torpedo tube launch.

- SM39 (submarine-launched) – B2 Mod 2: deployed on submarines. The missile is housed inside a watertight launched capsule (Véhicule Sous-Marin, VSM), which is fired from the submarine's torpedo tubes. On leaving the water, the capsule is ejected and the missile's motor is ignited. It then behaves like an MM40. The missile can be fired at depth, which makes it particularly suitable for discreet submarine operations.
- MM40 (surface-launched) – Block 1, Block 2 and Block 3: deployed on warships and in coastal batteries. Range: 72 km for the Block 2, in excess of 200 km for the Block 3.
- SM40 (submarine-launched), deployed on submarines, is the successor of the EXOCET SM39.

=== MM40 Block 3 ===
In February 2004, the Direction Générale pour l'Armement (DGA) notified MBDA of a contract for the design and production of a new missile, the MM40 Block 3. It has an improved range, in excess of 180 kilometres (97 nautical miles) – through the use of a Microturbo TRI-40 turbojet engine, and includes four air intakes to provide continuous airflow to the power plant during high-g manoeuvres.

The Block 3 missile accepts GPS guidance system waypoint commands, which allow it to attack naval targets from different angles and to strike land targets, giving it a marginal role as a land-attack missile. The Block 3 Exocet is lighter than the previous MM40 Block 2 Exocet.

45 Block 3 Exocets were ordered by the French Navy in December 2008 for its ships which were carrying Block 2 missiles, namely Horizon-class and Aquitaine-class frigates. From 2021, the Block 3 upgrade was also being extended to three of the La Fayette-class frigates selected for life extension refits. These are not to be new productions but the conversion of older Block 2 missiles to the Block 3 standard. An MM40 Block 3 last qualification firing took place on the Île du Levant test range on 25 April 2007 and series manufacturing began in October 2008. The first firing of the Block 3 from a warship took place on 18 March 2010, from the French Navy air defence frigate Chevalier Paul. In 2012, a new motor, designed and manufactured in Brazil by the Avibras company in collaboration with MBDA, was tested on an MM40 missile of the Brazilian Navy.

Besides the French, the Block 3 has been ordered by several other navies including those of Greece, the UAE, Chile, Peru, Qatar, Oman, Indonesia and Morocco.

The chief competitors to the Exocet are the US-made Harpoon, the Turkish Atmaca, the Italian Otomat, Israel Gabriel-V, the Swedish RBS 15 and the Chinese Yingji series.

=== MM40 Block 3c ===
The “Block 3c” variant integrates a digital Radio Frequency (RF) seeker to the missile that has been developed by Thales. The Block 3c variant is described as more resistant to jamming systems and may be able to recognize surface vessels, based on the use of advanced waveforms. Block 3 missiles introduced a longer 200 kilometer range but retained the same RF seeker as Block 2. This technology remained non-digital.

The Block 3c variant was to begin delivery to the French Navy in December 2022, with 55 new missiles ordered in addition to 45 “MM40 Block 3c kits” to update existing Block 3 missiles to the Block 3c configuration. In September 2023, tests of the missile conducted by the frigate Alsace confirmed the variant as ready for operational service.

On 15 April 2025, Greece signed a contract in Athens for the procurement of 16 Exocet MM40 Block 3c variant missiles.

== Operational history ==
=== Falklands War ===
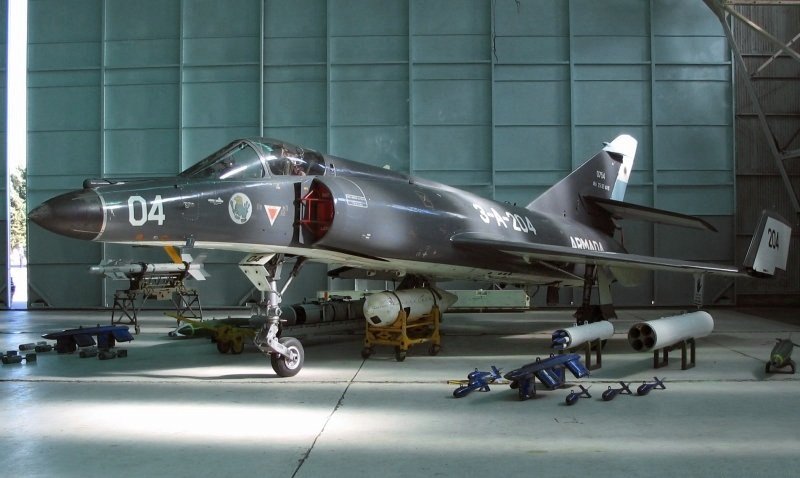
Sue 204 (Dassault-Breguet Super Étendard) of Argentina's 2nd Navy Squadron, used in the Atlantic Conveyor attack

In total, Argentina used six Exocet missiles against the Royal Navy.

In 1982, during the Falklands War, Argentine Navy Dassault-Breguet Super Étendard warplanes carrying the AM39 air-launched version of the Exocet fired two, causing damage which sank the Royal Navy destroyer HMS Sheffield on 4 May 1982. Two more Exocets struck the 15,000-ton merchant ship Atlantic Conveyor on 25 May. Two MM38 ship-to-ship missiles were removed from the destroyer ARA Seguí (a former US Navy Allen M. Sumner-class destroyer) and transferred to an improvised launcher for land use. The missiles were launched on 12 June 1982 and one hit the destroyer HMS Glamorgan.

==== HMS Sheffield ====
Sheffield was a Type 42 guided missile destroyer. On 4 May 1982, Sheffield, at defence watches (second-degree readiness), was the southernmost of three Type 42 destroyers when she was hit by one of two AM39 air-launched Exocet missiles fired by Argentinian Super Étendard strike fighters. The second missile splashed into the sea about half a mile off her port beam.

The missile that struck Sheffield hit on the starboard side at deck level 2, travelled through the junior ratings' scullery and breached the Forward Auxiliary Machinery Room/Forward Engine Room bulkhead 2.4 metres (7 ft 10 in) above the waterline, creating a hole in the hull roughly 1.2 m × 3 m (3.9 ft × 9.8 ft). It appears that the warhead did not explode. Twenty members of her crew were killed and 26 injured. The ship foundered while under tow on 10 May. The loss of Sheffield was a deep shock to the British public and government.

The official Royal Navy Board of Inquiry Report stated that evidence indicates that the warhead did not detonate. During the four and a half days that the ship remained afloat, five salvage inspections were made and a number of photographs were taken. Members of the crew were interviewed and testimony was given by Exocet specialists (the Royal Navy had 15 surface combat ships armed with Exocets in the Falklands War). There was no evidence of an explosion, although burning propellant from the rocket motor caused fires which could not be checked as firefighting equipment had been put out of action.

==== SS Atlantic Conveyor ====
Atlantic Conveyor was a 14,950 ton roll-on/roll-off container ship that had been hastily converted to carry aircraft on her deck. She was carrying helicopters and supplies, including cluster bombs. On 25 May, Two Exocet missiles had been fired at a frigate, but had been confused by its [chaff] defences and re-targeted the Atlantic Conveyor. Both missiles struck the container ship on her port quarter; their warheads exploded either after penetrating the ship's hull, or on impact. Witness Prince Andrew reported that debris caused "splashes in the water about a quarter of a mile away". Twelve men were killed and the survivors were taken to HMS Hermes. Atlantic Conveyor sank while under tow three days later.

==== HMS Invincible ====
On 30 May, two Super Étendards, one carrying Argentina's last remaining air-launched Exocet, escorted by four Douglas A-4C Skyhawks, each with two 500 lb bombs, took off to attack the carrier HMS Invincible. Argentine intelligence had sought to determine the position of Invincible from analysis of aircraft flight routes from the task force to the islands. However, the British had a standing order that all aircraft conduct a low-level transit when leaving or returning to the ship to disguise her position. This tactic compromised the Argentine attack, which focused on a group of escorts 40 miles south of the main body of ships. Two of the attacking Skyhawks were shot down: one by a Sea Dart missile fired by HMS Exeter, and while the fate of the Exocet has never been established beyond doubt, the crew of HMS Avenger claimed that their 4.5-inch gun had shot it down. No damage was caused to any British vessels.

==== HMS Glamorgan ====
HMS Glamorgan was a County-class destroyer launched in 1964. On 12 June 1982 an MM38 Exocet missile was fired from an improvised shore-based launcher as she was steaming at about 20 knots (37 km/h) 18 nautical miles (33 km) offshore. The first attempt to fire a missile did not result in a launch; on the second attempt, a missile was launched but did not acquire the target. The third attempt resulted in a missile tracking Glamorgan. The incoming Exocet missile was spotted on Glamorgan and a turn was ordered to present the stern to the missile.

The turn prevented the missile from striking the ship's side and penetrating the hull; instead, it hit the deck coaming at an angle, near the port Seacat missile launcher, skidded along the deck and exploded, making a 10 ft × 15 ft (3 m × 5 m) hole in the hangar deck and a 5 ft × 4 ft (1.5 m × 1.2 m) hole in the galley below. The blast travelled forwards and down, and the missile body, still travelling forwards, penetrated the hangar door, causing the ship's fuelled and armed Westland Wessex HAS.3 helicopter (XM837) to explode and start a severe fire in the hangar. Fourteen crew members were killed.

==== Post–Falklands war ====
In the years after the Falklands War, it was revealed that the British government and the Secret Intelligence Service (MI6) had been extremely concerned at the time by the perceived inadequacy of the Royal Navy's anti-missile defences against the Exocet and the missile's potential to tip the naval war decisively in favour of the Argentinian forces. A scenario was envisioned in which one or both of the force's two aircraft carriers (Invincible and Hermes) were destroyed or incapacitated by Exocet attacks, which would make recapturing the Falklands much more difficult.

Actions were taken to contain the Exocet threat. A major intelligence operation was initiated to prevent the Argentine Navy from acquiring more of the weapons on the international market. The operation included British intelligence agents claiming to be arms dealers able to supply large numbers of Exocets to Argentina, who diverted Argentina from pursuing sources which could genuinely supply a few missiles. France denied deliveries of Exocet AM39s purchased by Peru to avoid the possibility that Peru might supply them to Argentina because they knew that payment would be made with credit from the Central Bank of Peru. British intelligence had detected the guarantee was a deposit of $200 million from the Andean Lima Bank, an owned subsidiary of the Italian Banco Ambrosiano.

=== Iran–Iraq War ===
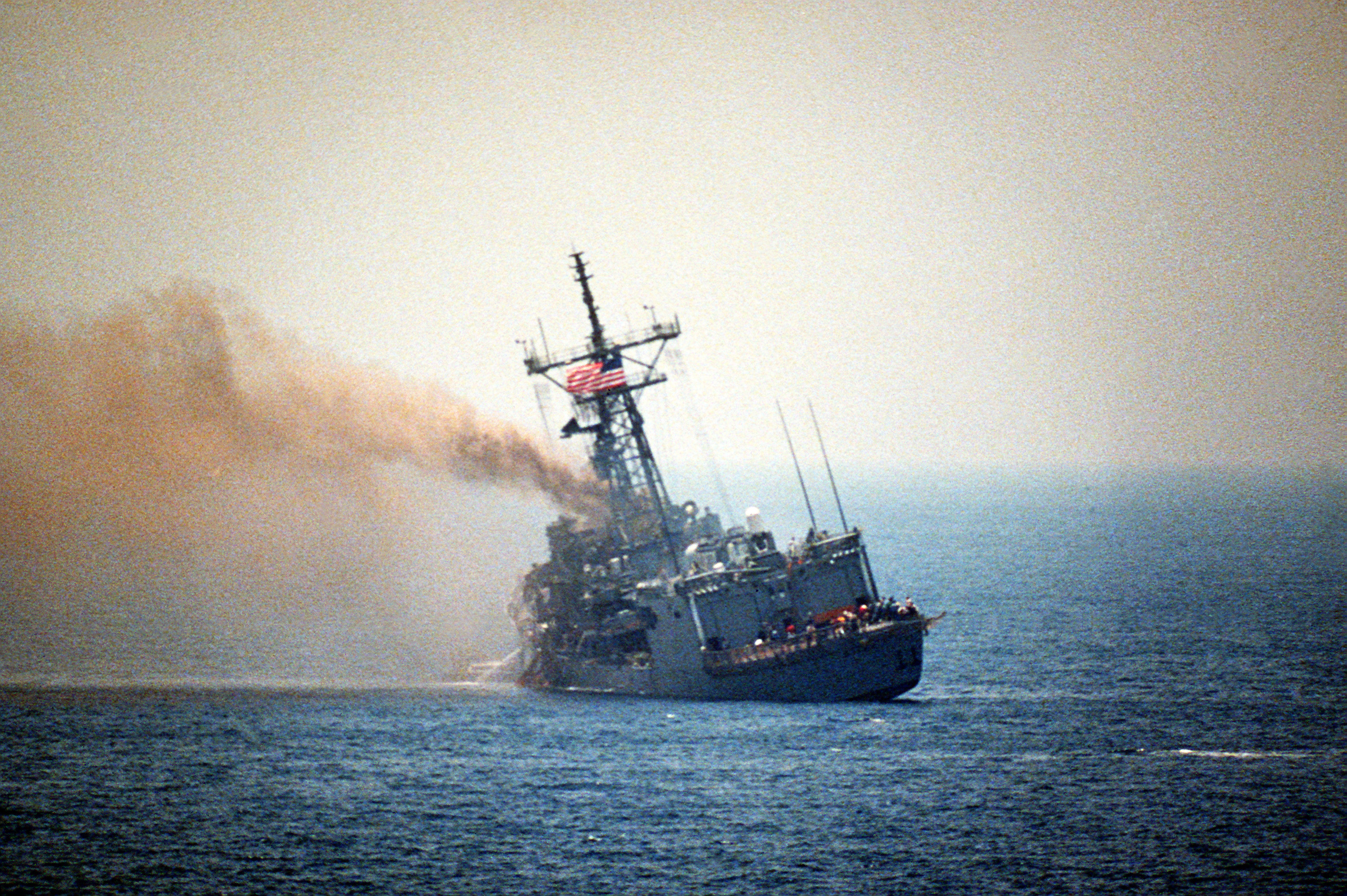
Stark listing after being hit

Exocet missiles were used by Iraq mainly as part of the Tanker War; the Aérospatiale SA 321 Super Frelon, Dassault-Breguet Super Étendard and Dassault Mirage F1 were aircraft used by Iraq to launch the missiles.

During the Iran–Iraq War, on 17 May 1987, an Iraqi aircraft (identified as a Mirage F1, but was in fact a modified Dassault Falcon 50) fired two Exocet missiles at the U.S. frigate USS Stark. Both missiles struck the port side of the ship near the bridge. No weapons were fired in defence; the Phalanx CIWS remained in standby mode and the Mark 36 SRBOC countermeasures were not armed. Thirty-seven United States Navy sailors were killed and twenty-one were wounded. The ship did not sink, and was eventually repaired.

== Operators ==
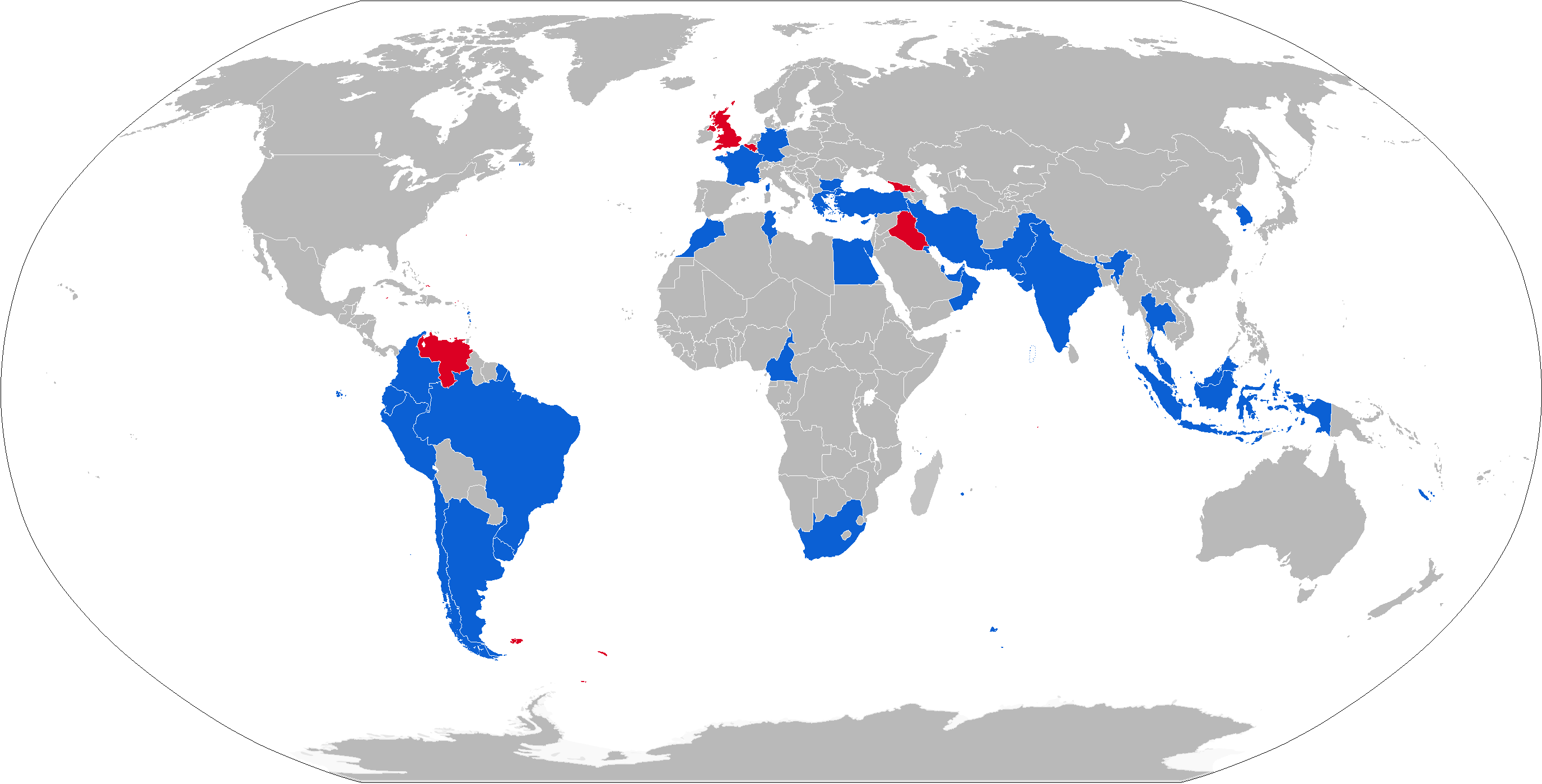
Operators Current Former

External images
- Aerospatiale EXOCET
- AM 39 Exocet launched from French Navy Super Etendard
- Alpha Jet Lancier multi-role with Exocet AM 39
- AM 39 launched from Super Puma
- Exocet MM 40 fired from French vessel
- Test firing of SM 39 subsurface version of Exocet high resolution
- Aerospatiale Media Relations Photo Sent Out Shortly After Falkland's War
- Super Etendard taking off with test AM39 under wing. Note, electronic pod under fuselage and drop tank under other wing pylon.
- First test launch of Exocet MM40 Block 3

=== Current operators ===
- Argentina
  - Argentine Navy – MM38, MM40 and AM39
- Brunei
  - Royal Brunei Navy – MM38, MM40
- Bulgaria
  - Bulgarian Navy
- Brazil
  - Brazilian Navy – MM38, MM40 Block 2 and AM39, SM-39
- Cameroon
  - Cameroon Navy – MM38, MM40 (on P-48S (Bakassi) craft)
- Chile
  - Chilean Navy – AM39, MM40 block-2, MM40 block-3 and SM39 for the Scorpène-class submarine.
- Colombia
- Cyprus
  - Cyprus Navy – MM40
- Ecuador: MM40
- Egypt: AM39, MM38 & MM40
- France
  - French Navy – MM38, MM40, AM39, SM39
- Greece
  - Hellenic Navy – MM38, MM40 Block 2/3/3c
  - Hellenic Air Force – AM39 Block 2
- Indonesia
  - Indonesian Navy – MM38, MM40 Block 2, MM40 Block 3
- India
  - Indian Navy (on Kalvari-class submarine)
- Kuwait
- Libya
- Malaysia
  - Royal Malaysian Navy – MM38, MM40 Block 2 and SM39 (on Scorpène-class submarines)
- Morocco
  - Royal Moroccan Navy – MM38, MM40 Block 2/3
  - Moroccan Air Force – AM39
- Oman
- Pakistan
  - Pakistan Navy – SM39 on Agosta 90B (Khalid)-class submarines
  - Sea King helicopters.
  - Pakistan Air Force – on the Mirage 5PA3
- Peru
  - Peruvian Navy – MM38 on PR-72P-class corvettes, AM39 Block 2 on ASH-3D Sea Kings and Mirage 2000P, MM40 Block 3 on Lupo-class frigates
- Qatar
- South Africa: South African Navy – MM40 Block 2 on Valour-class frigates. The navy plans to upgrade to the Block 3 missile.
- Thailand
  - Royal Thai Navy – MM38
- Tunisia
  - MM-40 Exocet for the La Combattante III-class fast attack craft
- Turkey
  - MM38 (Replaced by Atmaca)
- United Arab Emirates
  - UAE Navy MM40 Block 3 on Baynunah-class corvette
- Uruguay
  - National Navy of Uruguay – MM38 on João Belo-class frigates

=== Former operators ===
- Belgium
  - Belgian Navy – Operated Exocet on its Wielingen-class frigates. These warships were all sold in 2008 to Bulgaria.
- Georgia
  - Georgian Navy
- Germany
  - German Navy - MM38 used on Hamburg-class destroyers, Albatros-class fast attack craft, Gepard-class fast attack craft, and initially on F123 Brandenburg-class frigates (replaced by Harpoon launchers from the F122 Bremen-class frigates when those were decommissioned)
- Iraq
  - Iraqi Air Force – Operated the Exocet on its Mirage F1EQ and Super Étendards during the Iran–Iraq War.
  - Iraqi Navy - used on Super Frelon helicopters during the war with Iran.
- South Korea
  - Republic of Korea Navy
- United Kingdom
  - Royal Navy - Operated Exocet until the last MM38 armed surface vessel was decommissioned in 2002.
- Venezuela
  - Venezuelan Air Force – Operated Exocet on its Dassault Mirage 50s.

== See also ==
- AGM-158C LRASM – (United States)
- Atmaca – (Turkey)
- Blue Spear – (Israel)
- HAS-250 – (United Arab Emirates)
- Harpoon – (United States)
- Kh-35 – (Russia)
- MAN-1 – (Brazil)
- Naval Strike Missile – (Norway)
- NASM-MR – (India)
- R-360 Neptune – (Ukraine)
- Otomat – (Italy, France)
- Sea Eagle – (United Kingdom)
- Sea Killer / Marte – (Italy)
- SSM-700K C-Star – (South Korea)
- Type 80 air-to-ship missile – (Japan)
- Type 88 surface-to-ship missile – (Japan)
- Type 90 ship-to-ship missile – (Japan)
- Type 93 air-to-ship missile – (Japan)
- YJ-83 – (China)
