= HAS-250 =

Anti-ship missile

- Type: Anti-ship missile Surface-to-surface missile
- Place of origin: United Arab Emirates

Production history
- Designer: Halcon Systems
- Manufacturer: Halcon Systems

Specifications
- Mass: 1,200 kg (2,600 lb)
- Length: 5.4 m (17 ft 9 in)
- Diameter: 43.5 cm (1 ft 5.1 in)
- Warhead: 200 kg (440 lb)
- Engine: Solid propellant engine HS-350 turbojet engine
- Operational range: 250 km (160 mi; 130 nmi)
- Flight altitude: Sea-skimming
- Maximum speed: Mach 0.8; 987 km/h (613 mph; 533 kn)
- Guidance system: active radar homing, Inertial guidance and GPS guidance

HAS-250 is an Emirati long range anti-ship cruise missile that is made for naval and coastal targets. Guided by active radar homing, Global Positioning System and inertial guidance system. HAS-250 is developed by Halcon Systems in Abu Dhabi.
