= Launch capsule =

Naval weapon device

A launch capsule is a device used to propel a submarine-launched missile or drone to the ocean surface. Upon reaching the ocean surface, the launch capsule is jettisoned, and the missile continues its journey, propelled by its booster motor.
