= Northwestern University Dance Marathon =

US annual philanthropic dance marathon

- Abbreviation: NUDM
- Formation: 1975
- Purpose: Philanthropy
- Location: Evanston, IL
- Volunteers: 1,500
- Website: Official website

The Northwestern University Dance Marathon, commonly known as NUDM, is a philanthropic dance marathon held every March at Northwestern University in Evanston, Illinois. Founded in 1975, NUDM is one of the nation's most established and largest entirely student-run philanthropies. NUDM is one of the only annual Dance Marathons in the country to continually change its primary beneficiary. NUDM has raised over $23 million for its beneficiaries in its 50-year history, and involves over 1,000 students participating as dancers and committee members. Since 1997, the Evanston Community Foundation has been NUDM's secondary beneficiary.

== Recent marathons ==
=== 2024 ===
In 2024, NUDM supported Ronald McDonald House Charities- Chicagoland and Northwest Indiana (RMHC-CNI) and the Evanston Community Foundation (ECF). RMHC-CNI is a nonprofit organization that houses and supports families with children in need of medical attention, providing them with a “home away from home” while their child is in the hospital. This was the 50th year of NUDM, and the event took place for 15 hours in Welsh-Ryan Arena for the first time. NUDM raised $342,138 for its beneficiaries during the 2024 event.

=== 2023 ===
In 2023, NUDM supported Little Heroes League (LHL) and the Evanston Community Foundation (ECF). This was NUDM's 26th year working with ECF. LHL is a Chicago-based nonprofit organization working to improve the lives of medically complex babies and their families by providing life-saving care coordination services, both while the babies are being treated in the NICU and after they are discharged to outpatient status. This was the first year the beneficiary was able to visit the NUDM tent after the COVID-19 Pandemic. NUDM raised $434,455 for its beneficiaries during its 2023 event.

=== 2022 ===
In 2022, NUDM supported Chicago Youth Programs and the Evanston Community Foundation (ECF). This was NUDM's 25th year working with ECF. Chicago Youth Programs (CYP) is a nonprofit organization striving to improve the life opportunities and health of youth in low-income neighborhoods, primarily on the south and west sides of Chicago, through long-term academic, emotional, and mental support. In its first year back in person, NUDM raised $580,778 for its beneficiaries. During Block 10, the final three hours in the tent, dancers had to be evacuated due to an extreme weather warning; the event safely continued in the Louis Room of Norris University Center.

=== 2021 ===
In 2021, NUDM supported Compass to Care and the Evanston Community Foundation (ECF). This year, NUDM and Compass to Care worked together to eliminate the monetary burden of cancer-related travel costs, remove the stress of planning a trip and traveling with a child who is ill and give hope for their child’s cure from cancer. This Dance Marathon existed entirely virtually due to the COVID-19 Pandemic. Despite its online existence, the event still raised $674,375.

=== 2020 ===
In 2020, NUDM supported Children's Home and Aid and the Evanston Community Foundation (ECF). NUDM focused its efforts on supporting Daniel F. and Ada L. Rice Child & Family Center, located in Evanston, via both fundraising and service. The 30-hour dance marathon was unexpectedly and unprecedentedly canceled in 2020 by the Northwestern Administration on March 4, two days before it was set to kick-off, due to health concerns with “uncertainty surrounding COVID-19” (i.e. novel coronavirus). The NUDM Executive Board ultimately implemented a "virtual" NUDM, posting videos, quotes and thank you's via social media, which raised over $1 million - $1,029,366 exactly.

=== 2019 ===
For its 45th year, NUDM supported Communities in Schools of Chicago (CIS) and the Evanston Community Foundation, raising $1,114,514.62. CIS is a nonprofit organization that works to ensure that each and every public school student in Chicago graduates high school prepared for success. CIS believes that dropping out of school is a continuous process, not a single event— and so they strive to connect students to mentors and resources to end that process.

=== 2018 ===
In 2018, NUDM raised $1,175,709.82 for Cradles to Crayons and the Evanston Community Foundation. Cradles to Crayons provides children from birth through age 12, living in homeless or low-income situations, with the essential items they need to thrive – at home, at school and at play. To further Cradles to Crayons’ cause, NUDM celebrated a yearlong philanthropic effort to connect communities and enable childhood dreams.

=== 2017 ===
In May 2016, GiGi's Playhouse was announced as the primary beneficiary for NUDM 2017. GiGi's Playhouse is a nationwide network of Down syndrome achievement centers that impacts the lives of children and adults with Down syndrome through free educational and therapeutic programs. Through its partnership with GiGi's, NUDM hopes to improve the lives of individuals with Down syndrome and simultaneously share a message of global acceptance for people of all abilities.

For the 20th consecutive year, the Evanston Community Foundation was announced as NUDM 2017's secondary beneficiary to honor the close relationship between Northwestern University and the city of Evanston.

=== 2016 ===
NUDM 2016 raised $1,201,216.24 for Blessings in a Backpack, a leading childhood hunger organization that mobilizes communities, individuals and resources to provide food on the weekends for elementary school children across America. NUDM fed more than 9,400 elementary schoolers that come from food insecure homes and made a direct impact on hunger in the Evanston and Chicago area, through both the expansion of programs at existing schools and the initiation of programs at new schools around the country.

In 2016, NUDM also introduced a service program, offering students the chance to make a non-monetary impact by volunteering their time in the community with the beneficiaries. The organization also vastly expanded fundraising and monetization opportunities during the actual 30-hour event, introduced new fundraising and hour-club incentives for dancers, created new sponsorship naming rights, and added half a dozen new special events.

=== 2015 ===
In 2015, NUDM raised $1,130,979 for Starlight Children's Foundation, a global organization that supports critically and chronically ill children and their families from hospital to home. This money supported the creation of 11 "Starlight Sites," beautifully designed pediatric treatment rooms and playrooms reaching nearly 477,865 children in just one year.

=== 2014 ===
For its 40th year, NUDM supported Team Joseph, raising a record-breaking $1,385,273 to fund research to find a cure for Duchenne Muscular Dystrophy. This remains the highest total ever raised for the event.

== History ==
Fifty years ago, Dance Marathon, the philanthropic child of Alpha Tau Omega fraternity and the Associated Student Government, was born on the Northwestern University campus.

The Dance Marathon was inspired by NU's participation in the University of Illinois dance marathon in 1974. After representing NU at UI, Jan Jacobowitz approached Tim Rivelli, Associated Student Government Vice President, with the idea of starting a dance marathon at Northwestern. Tim and Jan met with representatives of the American Epilepsy Foundation and the Dance Marathon was born. Tim's fraternity, ATO, took charge of the operation and ran the dance marathon.

Twenty-one couples danced for NUDM in 1975. It was called the "Dance to Give Them a Chance" marathon then, and it benefited the American Epilepsy Foundation and the National Association for Retarded Citizens. Fifteen couples made it through the fifty-two-hour marathon, raising $9,105 at Blomquist Memorial Gymnasium. The winning couple, Donna Miller and Tony Krileff, was sponsored by Bobb Hall and a local liquor store.

NUDM 1976 saw a new venue as the dancing was moved to Patten Gym and the dancing time was lessened to twenty-six hours. When the sponsor decided to discontinue the event after two years, Triangle Fraternity picked up the mantle and looked for a venue where other fund-raising events were possible. In 1977, NUDM found its current home: the Norris University Center, where students have been dancing for thirty hours at a time ever since. To institutionalize the event for the long haul and ensure a continuing flow of good ideas from students, organizers turned it into a campus-wide charitable event.

Special events to raise extra money for the cause were added over the years, like the NUDM Spa (where manicures and haircuts are given in Norris during the weekend of NUDM), Guac Drop, and of course trivia. Other events take place to keep the rest of the campus involved while the dancers are busy, such as a DDR tournament, a 10/5k run, a goat and mini-horse petting zoo, and performances by on-campus groups.

Chicago's The Second City comedy troupe paid a visit in 1984. Since that time, popular bands and performers have been a highlight of the weekend of, including Northwestern alumnus Jay Sims, who has been DJing a portion of the event every year since 1996. NUDM has attracted the attention of celebrities such Barack Obama, George and Barbara Bush, Frank Sinatra Jr., Adam Sandler, the cast of Modern Family, and NU alumni David Schwimmer, Seth Meyers, Stephen Colbert and Mike Greenberg. Chicago celebrities, like former mayor Jane Byrne and Chicago Bears players Mike Tomczak, Keith Van Horne and Trace Armstrong, have also danced.

In 2011, NUDM was named The Most Influential College Organization at the 2011 Stay Classy Awards after its record-breaking year.

== List of NUDM Primary Beneficiaries ==
Year	Beneficiary	Total Raised (USD)	Primary Beneficiary Check (USD)
2024	Ronald McDonald House Charities- Chicagoland and Northwest Indiana	$342,138	$264,067
2023	Little Heroes League	$434,455	$288,191
2022	Chicago Youth Programs	$580,778	$403,551
2021	Compass to Care	$674,375	TBD
2020	Children's Home & Aid	$1,029,366	$903,787
2019	Communities In Schools of Chicago	$1,144,515	$911,861
2018	Cradles to Crayons	$1,175,709	$942,793
2017	GiGi's Playhouse	$1,253,596	$983,833
2016	Blessings in a Backpack	$1,201,216	$965,057
2015	Starlight Children’s Foundation	$1,130,979	$863,490
2014	Team Joseph	$1,385,273	$931,289
2013	The Danny Did Foundation	$1,214,632	$741,394
2012	The Andrew McDonough B+ (Be Positive) Foundation	$1,107,670	$717,770
2011	Children's Heart Foundation	$1,019,130	$632,689
2010	StandUp for Kids	$854,396	$461,547
2009	Project Kindle	$917,834	$576,470
2008	Bear Necessities	$933,855	$590,000
2007	Citizens United for Research in Epilepsy	$708,711	$423,028
2006	Pediatric AIDS Chicago Prevention Initiative (PACPI)	$686,377	$400,048
2005	Juvenile Diabetes Research Foundation	$625,131	$374,004
2004	Have Dreams	$461,294	$319,997
2003	Chicago Urban Youth Scholarship Fund	$462,613	$300,723
2002	Little Heroes Pediatric Cancer Research Foundation (formerly known as Friends for Steven)	$492,000	$380,000
2001	Elizabeth Glaser Pediatric AIDS Foundation	$540,257	$393,172
2000	Gilda's Club Chicago	$537,645	
1999	Children's Heart Foundation	$450,833	
1998	La Rabida Children's Hospital and Research Center	$431,524	
1997	Hope for Gus Foundation	$405,563	
1996	Make-A-Wish Foundation of Northern Illinois	$315,143	
1995	Pediatrics AIDS Ward of Children's Memorial Hospital (now Lurie Children's Hospital)	$301,023	
1994	Leukemia Research Foundation	$250,258	
1993	American Heart Association	$200,438	
1992	American Diabetes Association	$273,000	
1990	The Leukemia & Lymphoma Society	$136,300	
1989	The Leukemia & Lymphoma Society (formerly The Leukemia Society of America)	$112,628	
1988	Howard Brown Health Center	$112,734	
1987	Cystic Fibrosis Foundation	$112,628	
1986	Easter Seals	$90,021	
1985	United Cerebral Palsy	$86,242	
1984	Easter Seals	$76,663	
1983	Juvenile Diabetes Research Foundation	$66,089	
1982	National Multiple Sclerosis Society	$60,428	
1981	Arthritis Foundation	$42,000	
1980	Respiratory Health Association of Metropolitan Chicago (formerly the Chicago Lung Association)	$33,100	
1979	United Cerebral Palsy	$30,000	
1978	United Way of Metropolitan Chicago	$26,507	
1977	American Epilepsy Foundation	$22,000	
1976	American Epilepsy Foundation and the National Association for Retarded Citizens	$9,573	
1975	American Epilepsy Foundation and the National Association for Retarded Citizens	$9,105	
Total		$23,116,777	
