= Walter Dill Scott (businessman) =

American businessman

Grand Metropolitan's Managing Director of U.S. operations
- In office 1984–1986
- Preceded by: Position Created
- Succeeded by: Ian A. Martin

CEO of the Investors Diversified Services
- In office 1980–1984
- Preceded by: Charles R. Orem
- Succeeded by: Harvey Golub

Personal details
- Born: Walter Dill Scott; 1931 Chicago, Illinois, U.S.
- Died: February 8, 2018 (aged 86) Evanston, Illinois
- Spouse: Barbara Stein
- Children: 3
- Relatives: Walter Dill Scott (grandfather)
- Education: Northwestern University (BS); Columbia Business School (MS)

Walter Dill Scott (1931–2018) was an American businessman who served as CEO of Investors Diversified Services (now Ameriprise Financial) and the managing director of Grand Metropolitan's U.S. division.

== Early life ==
Scott was born in Chicago and grew up in Evanston, Illinois and Winnetka, Illinois. He was named after his grandfather, who was president of Northwestern University from 1920 to 1939.

He graduated from New Tier High School in 1949 and then attended Williams College. He graduated from Northwestern University in 1953. He spent three years in the United States Navy as an officer. After his military service ended, Scott moved to New York City, where he worked for Booz Allen Hamilton and attended Columbia Business School. After graduating in 1958, Scott went to work for Glore, Forgan & Co. In 1961 he married Barbara Stein. They had three sons.

== Career ==
In 1965, Scott was named general partner in charge of the Chicago office of Lehman Brothers. He left the business world in 1973 to become the associate director of the Office of Management and Budget, where he helped assemble the federal budget.

Scott left the OMB in 1975 and joined the Pillsbury Company as senior vice president and chief financial officer. The following year he was added to the company's board of directors and its executive office. He was later given control of Pillsbury's international operations and in 1978 was given the new title of executive vice president for administration and finance. He helped Pillsbury acquire Green Giant, Steak and Ale, and Totino's.

In 1980, Scott left Pillsbury to become the chief executive officer of Investors Diversified Services, then a subsidiary of the Alleghany Corporation. After IDS was acquired by American Express, Scott was removed as CEO in favor of Harvey Golub and reassigned to the position of chairman. He left the company later that year to become the managing director of Grand Metropolitan's U.S. division, which owned Liggett & Myers Tobacco Company and its subsidiary Alpo, Children's World daycare centers, and was a major Pepsi bottler. He left Grand Metropolitan in 1986.

== Later life ==
From 1988 to 2013, Scott was a clinical professor for Northwestern's Kellogg School of Management, teaching courses on corporate strategy and leadership. He also served as chairman of Kellogg's board of advisers. He served on fifteen corporate boards and the boards of 25 nonprofit organizations, including Communities In Schools of Chicago, One Acre Fund, and National Louis University. He was a longtime resident of Northfield, Illinois but moved to Evanston in 2017. Scott died on February 8, 2018, at Evanston Hospital from lymphoma.
