= Chicago Public Schools =

Public school system in Chicago, Illinois, US

Chicago Public Schools City of Chicago School District #299

Address
- 42 West Madison Street Chicago, Cook County, Illinois, 60602; United States
- Coordinates: 41.88212740°N 87.62883500°W

District information
- Type: Public school district
- Motto: For every child, In every neighborhood.
- Grades: Pre-K–12th
- Established: January 5, 1837; 189 years ago
- Chief executive officer: Macquline King (interim)
- School board: Chicago Board of Education
- Chair of the board: Sean Harden
- Accreditation: AdvancED
- Schools: 641
- Budget: US$8.49 billion (2023–24)
- NCES District ID: 1709930

Students and staff
- Students: 324,130 (2024–25)
- Teachers: 23,532.39 (on an FTE basis)
- Staff: 44,074 (2023–24)
- Student–teacher ratio: 13.77
- Athletic conference: Chicago Public League

Other information
- Website: www.cps.edu

Chicago Public Schools (CPS; administratively referred to by the state of Illinois as City of Chicago School District #299 for funding and districting reasons) is a public school district in the city of Chicago, Illinois, United States.

It is the fourth-largest school district in the United States (after New York City, Los Angeles, and Miami-Dade County). CPS students attend a particular school based on their area of residence, except for charter, magnet, and selective enrollment schools.

As of the 2025–2026 school year, CPS has 630 schools, including 423 district-run elementary schools and 91 high schools. Charter schools numbered at 108, of which 50 were elementary and 58 high schools. CPS also includes 6 contract schools and 2 SAFE schools.

CPS is led by a chief executive officer, an alternative title for the position of superintendent in most other public school systems.

== Statistics ==
CPS reported a student–teacher ratio of 15.84 for the 2019–20 school year. For the 2020–21 school year, 46.7% of CPS students were Latino and 35.8% were African-American. 63.8% of the student body came from economically-disadvantaged households, and 18.6% of students were reported as English-language learners. Average salaries for the 2019–20 year were $74,225 for teachers and $114,199 for administrators. For the 2020–21 school year, CPS reported 39,323 staff positions, including 21,974 teachers and 516 principals. In 2021, CPS reported a budget of $6.92 billion with $3.75 billion from local sources, $1.85 billion from the state of Illinois, and $1.3 billion from the U.S. federal government. Per student spending was reported at $18,287 in 2023.

As of the start of the 2025-2026 school year, CPS reported an Elementary School student-teacher ratio of 18, while High School was reported as 19. For the 2025–26 school year, 46.4% of CPS students were Latino and 34.3% were African-American. 71.8% of the student body came from economically-disadvantaged households, and 27.3% of students were reported as English-language learners. Students with Disabilities were reported at 17.3% as well for the 2025-26 school year. Average salaries for the 2025-2026 year are projected to exceed $98,000 and anywhere between $130,000 and $160,000 for administrators. For the 2025–26 school year, CPS reported 46,451 staff positions, including 23,979 teachers and over 600 principals. In 2021, CPS reported a budget of $8.66 billion with $5,454.5 million from local sources, $2,299.8 million from the state of Illinois, and $902.8 million from the U.S. federal government.

The school system reported a graduation rate of 84.1% for the 2023–24 school year.

Chicago Public Schools led the nation in test score improvement, learned at a faster rate compared to 96% of all school districts in the country, and as of 2020, had an all-time high graduation rate. It has faced declining enrollments and school closings.

More than 80 percent of CPS students are Hispanic or Black.

== History ==
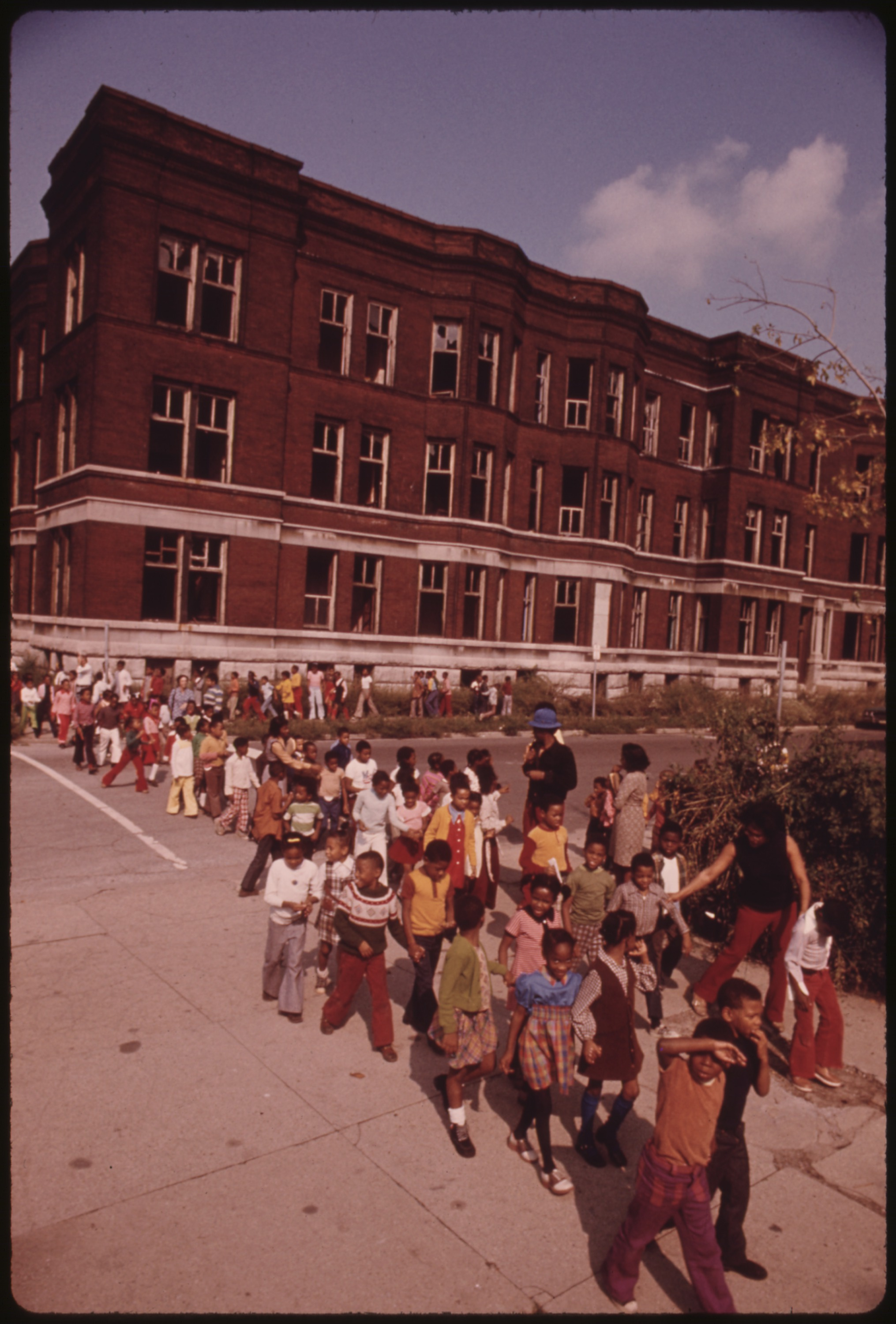
Children returning to class following a fire drill at a Chicago elementary school, 1973. Photo by John H. White.

As Chicago was started as a trading outpost in the 1800s, it took several years for a citywide school system with adequate funding and instructional personnel to emerge. As early as 1848, during the first term of the 12th Mayor of Chicago, James Hutchinson Woodworth, the city's need for a public school system was recognized by the city council. A higher educational standard for the system was stated by the mayor, both to reflect his philosophy as a former teacher, and to add an attribute to Chicago that would continue to attract productive citizens. In 1922, the school board voted unanimously to change policy that allocated library access based on color, "[extending] the same privileges to Race children to enter all the libraries as the white children enjoy", but maintaining segregated schools and specifying that "in each branch library all employees should belong to the race which attended the particular school".

In 1937, the city was hit by a polio outbreak which resulted in the Chicago Board of Health ordering schools to be closed during what was supposed to be the start of the school year. The school closure wound up lasting three weeks. Superintendent William Johnson and assistant superintendent Minnie Fallon managed to provide the instruction to the city's elementary school students by providing at-home distance education through radio broadcasts. This was the first large-scale implementation of radio broadcasting for distance education.

=== Funding ===
By the 1960s, schools across Chicago—and most of Illinois—were struggling to support themselves. Illinois school funding, according to scholar Tracy Steffes, was heavily reliant upon “funding by property taxes assessed in and bounded within districts of highly unequal wealth.” Wealthy districts paid less and got better schools, while poor districts got worse schools but paid even more. The problem was compounded by “soft” segregation measures such as redlining and “white flight,” which further delineated Chicago communities upon lines of both wealth and race. The introduction of the Illinois Resource Equalizer Formula in 1973 was intended to address this crisis by restructuring school financing to more evenly distribute property tax money, but many affluent white families protested the use of their taxes to pay for other (predominantly Black) communities’ education, rather than only their own district's schools. The formula was abolished in the late 1980s, and acute funding issues continue both in Chicago and across Illinois.

As of 2026, CPS faces a structural $734 million deficit for the fiscal year 2026 (FY2026). This is a result of expiring federal pandemic aid, rising pension obligations, and increased labor costs. In turn, forcing CPS to make difficult budget decisions. The district needs approximately $1.6 billion more in state funding to meet adequacy targets, and it must balance this gap while managing rising expenses and declining enrollment.

Elizabeth Todd-Breland argues that Black education reformers in Chicago developed community-driven strategies from the 1960s onward to address systemic inequities, but these efforts collided with neoliberal reforms that prioritized privatization and corporate models, exposing enduring tensions between racial justice and market-based policies.

=== School closures ===
From 2001 to 2009, CPS, under Arne Duncan's leadership, closed dozens of elementary and high schools due to classrooms being at low capacity or underperforming. Despite claims that the closures would help underperforming students, University of Chicago researchers found that most of the students who transferred as a result of the closures did not improve their performance. This is what led to the Renaissance 2010 initiative, which focused on closing public schools and opening more charter schools that were focused on one of the government structures: charter, performance, or contract. During this program's time, it has closed over 80 schools and plans to open 100 charter schools. This also include five military schools, three of which have Junior Reserve Officers' Training Corps programs. In response to CPS's announcements in 2013 that it was considering closing nearly 200 schools, many Chicago parents, students, teachers and community activists voiced their opposition through the media and at hearings around the city. In addition, several Illinois lawmakers, including chairman of the Senate education committee William Delgado (D-Chicago), pushed for a moratorium on school closings in CPS, citing "the disproportion[ate] effect on minority communities, the possibility of overcrowding and safety concerns for students who will have to travel further to class." On May 22, 2013, the school board voted to close 50 public schools. However, the majority of the closed schools have been in poor neighborhoods with a black population, such as Bronzeville. These areas are not only sites of demolished public housing, but now to closed-down schools. For every four schools that have been closed, three have been in these neighborhoods. Over 88% of the students affected by these closings have been African American.

=== Student and teacher protests ===
In 2013, Mayor Rahm Emanuel of Chicago initiated the closing of 54 public schools. Of the 54 public schools to be closed were 53 elementary schools and one high school. Mayor Rahm Emanuel claimed the school closings were a direct result from the nearly $1 billion deficit the city was facing due to under-enrollment at the schools. The schools to be closed were located on Chicago's South and West sides which provided education to mainly African-American Students. The Mayors decision to close the schools was met with rage and feelings of injustice by the communities affected and the Chicago Teachers Union. As a result, the CTU and other education activities responded by protesting.

In May 2013, the Chicago Teachers Union were joined by students and other education activities to march against the closings of 54 public schools that year. The activists planned three days of nonviolent demonstrations across the city of Chicago. The CTU gathered an upwards of 900 protesters to participate in rally's, marches, and sit-ins against Mayor Rahm Emanuel's decision to close the schools. Over 150 protesters participated in a sit-in in the middle of LaSalle Street, blocking traffic, and forcing the response of the Chicago Police Department. Many protesters peacefully left the scene when asked to by the CPD, but many held their ground. Protesters that did not agree to leave the scene were issued tickets. Over 50 people were arrested throughout the entire protests, but no acts of violence were reported.

== CPS teacher strikes ==
The Chicago Teachers Union's first strike occurred in May 1969, which lasted two days. The second strike occurred in January 1971, lasting four days from January 12 through January 15. The strike resulted in an 8% teacher's salary increase and a 7% increase for school staff workers. Another strike by the union occurred in January 1973, which lasted twelve days. The union was requesting that their salaries be increased and their class sizes be smaller. On September 3, 1975, The union went on strike for eleven days as a result to restore the loss of teaching and clerical jobs, overcrowding of classrooms.

=== 1980s strikes ===
In February 1980, the union went on strike again for a total of ten days; asking for paydays worked during financial crisis, changes to school board's spending cuts and job cuts. In 1983, CPS teachers went on a fifteen-day strike from October 3 to October 18 demanding a 10% salary increase. Superintendent Ruth B. Love offered raises between 1.6% and 4.8%, but the teachers' union rejected the proposal. The strike ended with the teachers receiving a 5% raise, 2.5% bonus and a one-year pact. Chicago Public School teachers went on a ten-day strike from November 23 to December 3, 1984, which resulted in a 4.5% raise. In 1985, the teachers had a two-day walkout. CPS teachers went on a nineteen-day strike from September 8, to October 3, 1987.

=== Strikes since 2000 ===
In September 2012, CPS teachers went on a nine-day strike, walking off the job for the first time in 25 years. The work stoppage, which began during the second week of the 2012 school year, culminated with a march on City Hall. Striking teachers voiced complaints about pay, teacher evaluations, and benefits, as well as general concerns about the neglect of the city's public school system. Soon after the strike, CEO Jean-Claude Brizard stepped down from his position. On October 17, 2019, The Chicago Teachers Union began another strike that lasted 11 days. The contract negotiated by the CTU and Mayor Lori Lightfoot resulted in the teachers winning smaller class sizes as well as more support staff. During said strike, CPS teachers also advocated for more nurses and counselors, as well as wider investments in school resources. Some participants in the strike framed the movement as an effort to address structural inequalities affecting students in economically-disadvantaged communities. Furthermore, the students will have five of the eleven days added to their school year.

== Demographics ==
CPS logo from 2009 until 2014

CPS logo from the late 1980s until 2009

For the 2018–2019 school year, CPS reports having 361,314 students including 17,668 in preschool, 24,128 in kindergarten, 213,651 in grades 1–8, and 105,867 in grades 9-12. The racial makeup of the student body is 46.7% Hispanics, 36.6% African-Americans, 10.5% White, 4.1% Asian/Pacific Islander, 1.2% Multi-Racial, 0.3% Native American, 0.2% Hawaiian/Pacific Islander and 0.3% unknown. Chicago Public Schools were the most racial-ethnically separated among large city school systems, according to research by The New York Times in 2012, as a result of most students' attending schools close to their homes. In the 1970s the Mexican origin student population grew in CPS, although it never exceeded 10% of the total CPS student population. From 1971 to 1977 and then to 1979, the Mexican student population in the Near West Side's CPS district 19 increased from 34% to 43% and then over 47%, respectively. In the 1980s, among the total CPS student population, the numbers of non-Hispanic Whites declined while Hispanics and Latinos, African-Americans, and other minorities increased. In 1982 16.3% of the CPS students were non-Hispanic White, while over 19% were of Mexican, Puerto Rican, and/or Cuban origin; that year the Hispanic and Latino population had overtaken the non-Hispanic White population.

Analyses based on Chicago Public Schools’ utilization data have reported that, in recent years, about one-third of CPS schools have operated at less than 50% of their buildings’ capacity. For example, CPS's school profile page for Douglass High School lists an enrollment of 29 students. A 2023–24 analysis reported that Douglass had an “ideal capacity” of 888 students.

== Schools ==
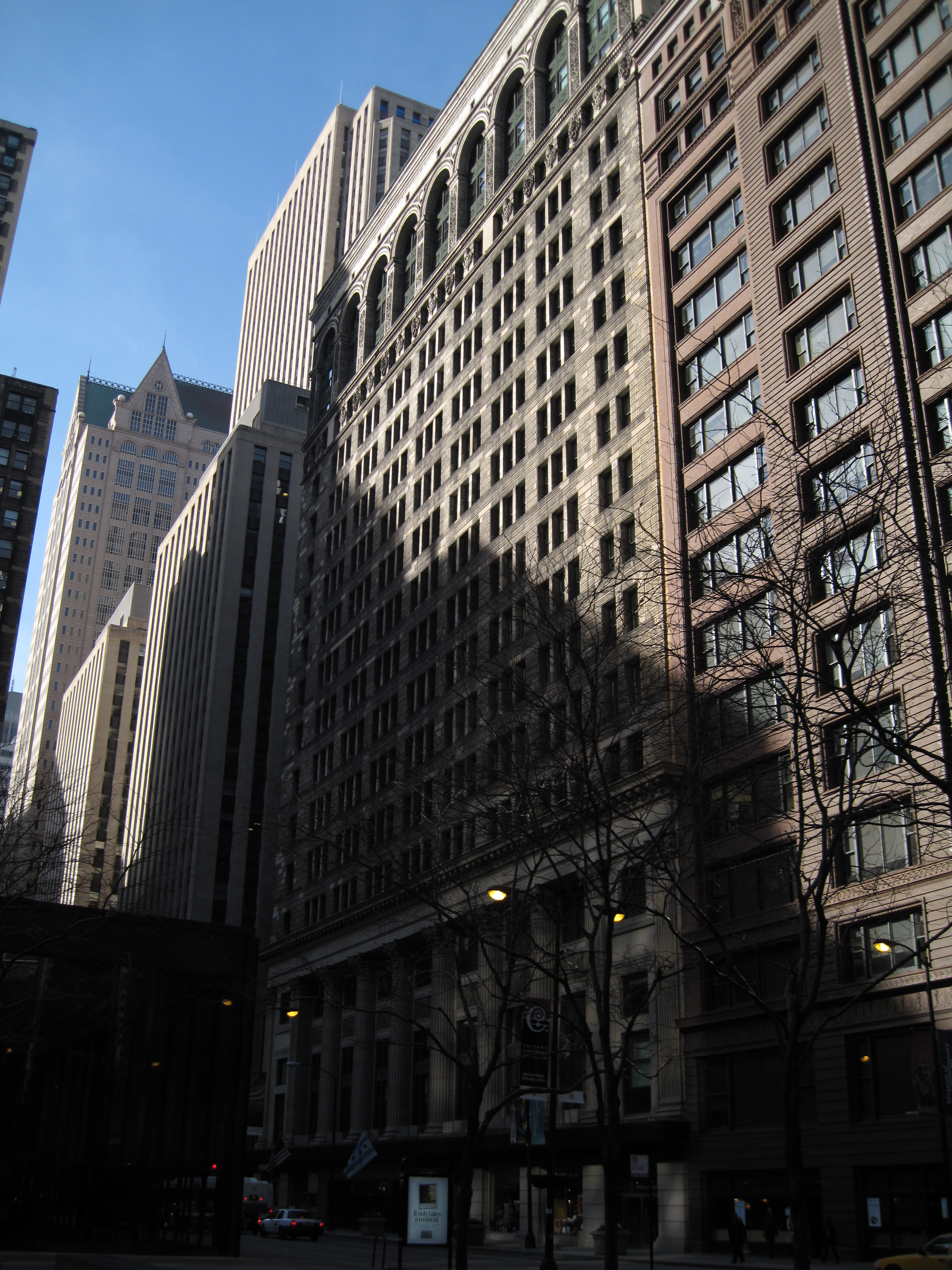
CPS headquarters from 1998 until 2014 in the Chicago Loop

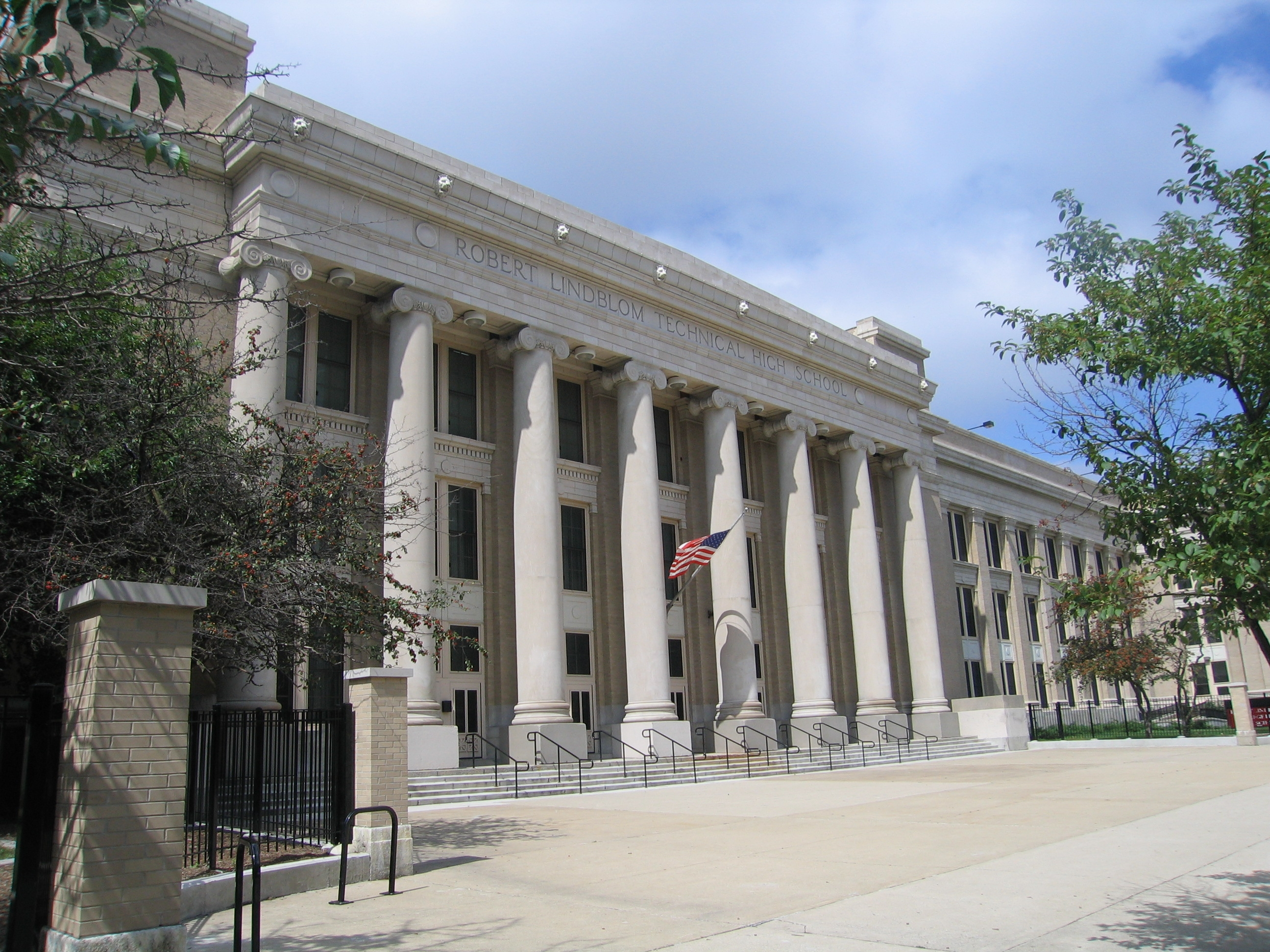
Lindblom Math & Science Academy

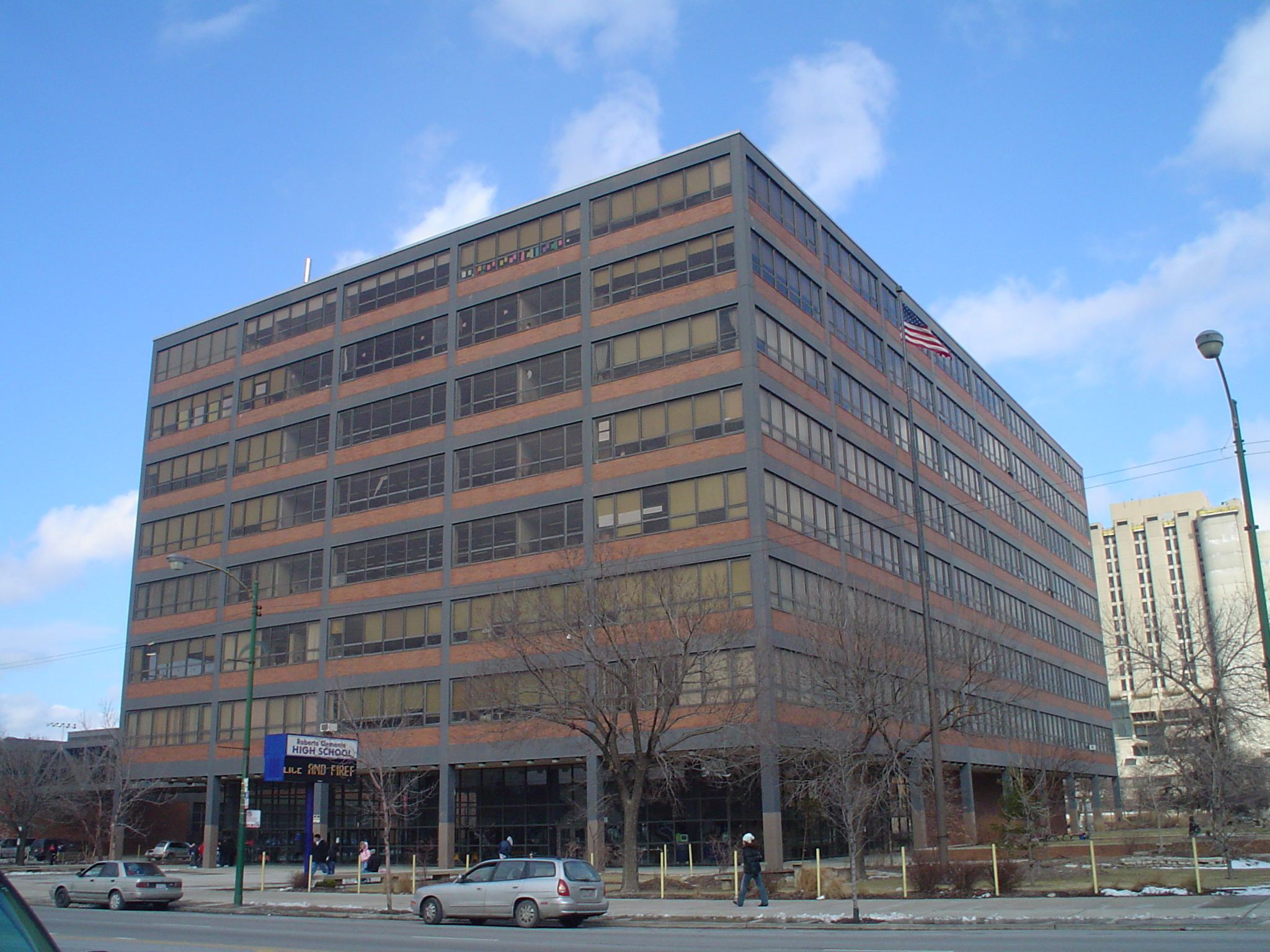
Roberto Clemente Community Academy

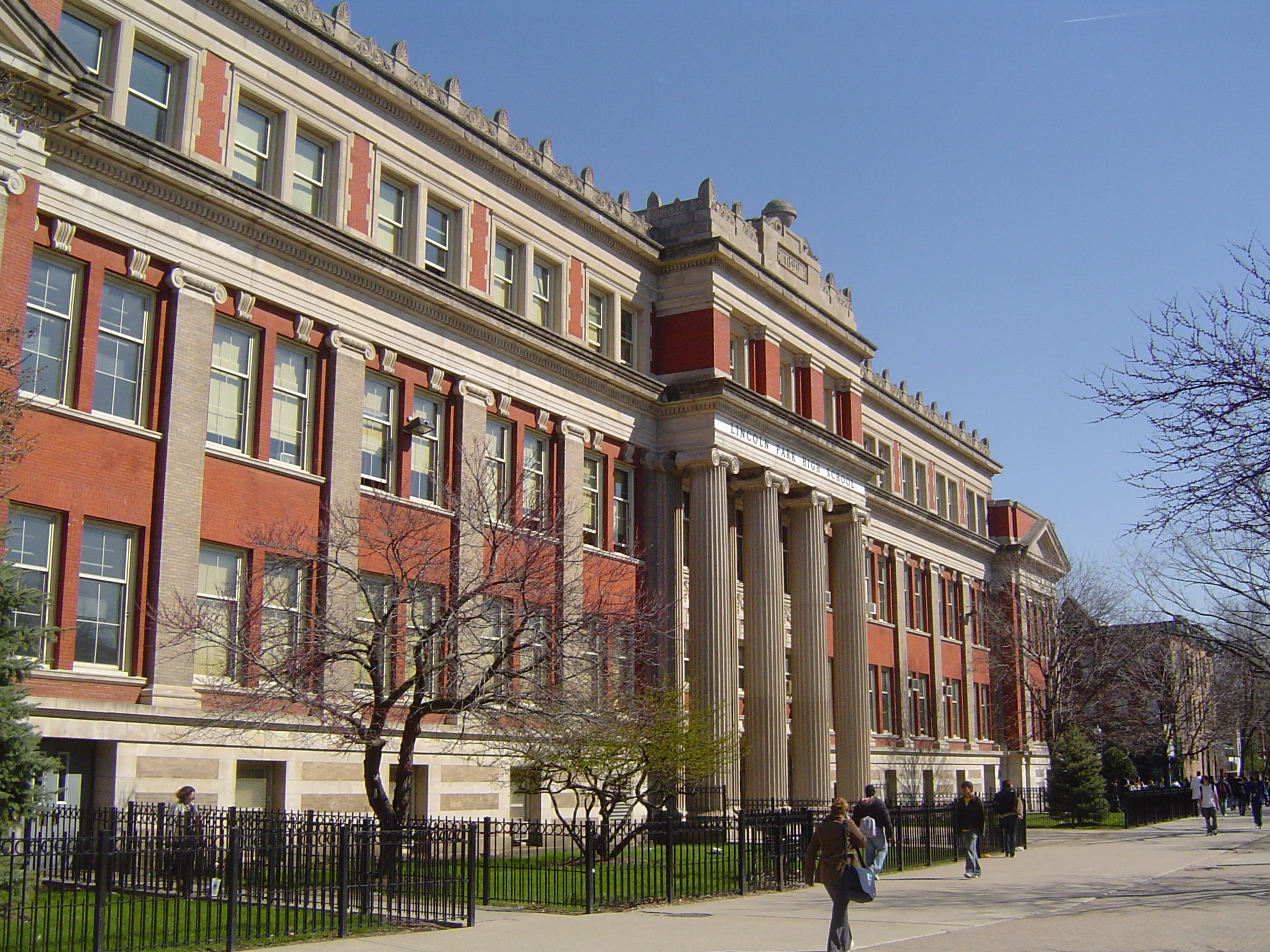
Lincoln Park High School

CPS is a system of primary, secondary, and disability schools confined to Chicago's city limits. This system is the second largest employer in Chicago.

Most schools in the district, whether prekindergarten-8th grade, elementary, middle, or secondary, have attendance boundaries restricting student enrollment to within a given area. A school may elect to enroll students outside its attendance boundaries if there is space or if it has a magnet cluster program. Full magnet schools are open to citywide student enrollment, provided that applicants meet a level of high academic standards. Magnets offer a variety of academic programs with various focuses, such as agriculture, fine arts, international baccalaureate, Montessori, math, literature, Paideia programs, and STEM (science, technology, engineering and math). STEM Magnet Academy is the first elementary school in the state of Illinois, and among the first in the nation, to offer a STEM-focused curriculum. The Chicago High School for the Arts (ChiArts) is the system's only audition based performing and visual arts high school. Chicago was the largest city in the country without a public high school for the arts until the establishment of ChiArts in 2009.

== Selective enrollment ==
=== Elementary schools ===
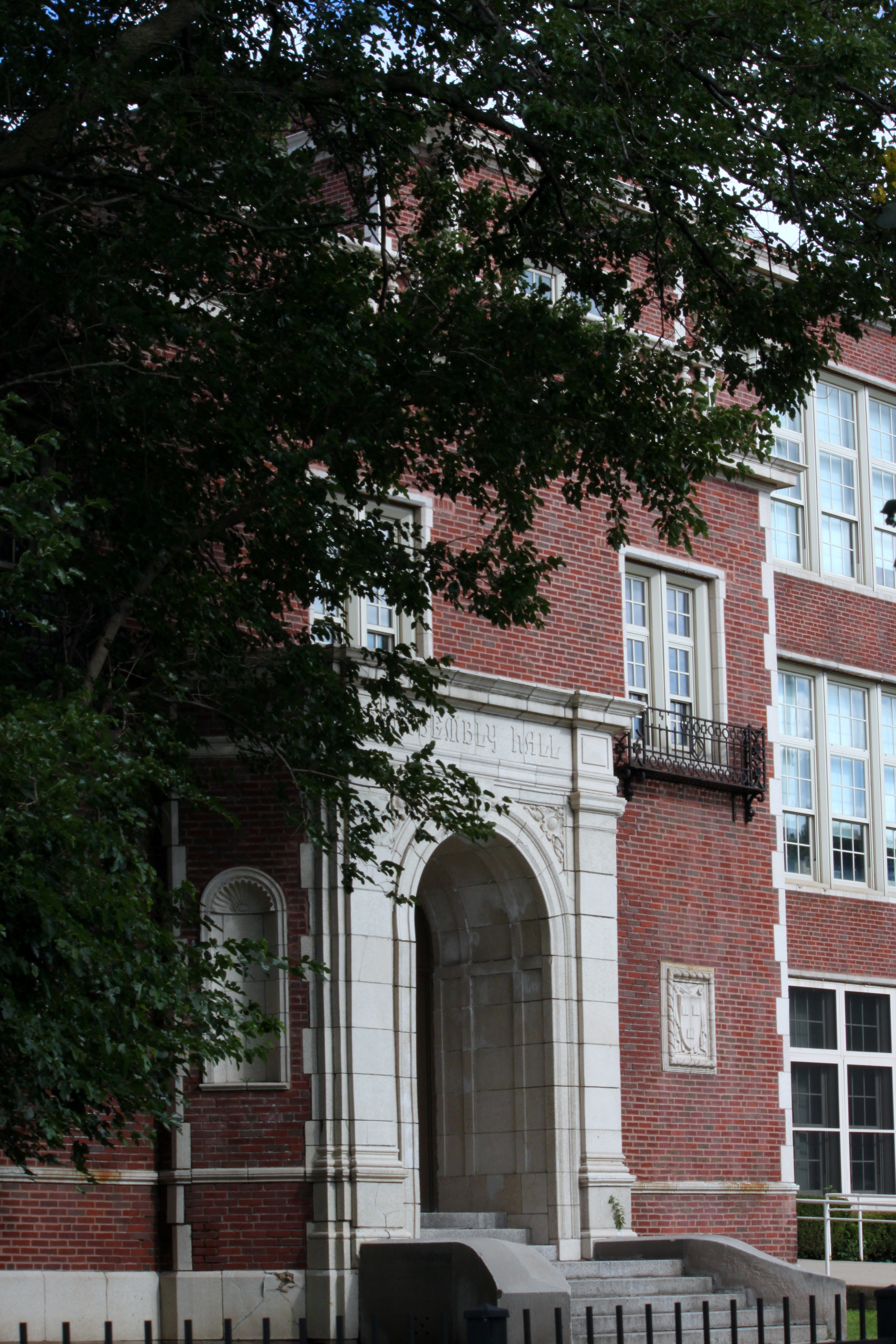
Lenart Regional Gifted Center

The school system contains two levels of primary school programs which make selective admission only. Regional gifted centers have an area of focus (such as math and science) and require one type of assessment, akin to an IQ test. Classical schools, in contrast to regional gifted centers, take a liberal arts approach focusing on all areas. Classical school applications thus require a different type of assessment.

=== Secondary schools ===
At the secondary level, CPS operates eleven selective enrollment high schools. These include Walter Payton College Prep, Northside College Prep, Jones College Prep, Young Magnet HS, Lane Tech College Prep, Lindblom Math and Science Academy, King College Prep, and Brooks High School. Selective Enrollment high schools work on a point system out of 900 points:

- 450 points for the CPS High School Admissions Test (tested in reading and math)
- 450 points for 7th grade grades (A=112.5, B=75, C=5; D and below=0)

Competition to get into selective enrollment schools is fierce, and many factors decide whether students are eligible for admissions:

- Ranking: Students are asked to rank in order of preference their top 6 selective enrollment high school programs —the higher a school is on the list,
- Points from the point system mentioned above

Prior to the 2021–2022 school year, the point system included three categories, each weighted at 300 points instead of the current 450. Instead of the CPS High School Admissions Test, the district used the Selective Enrollment High School exam, and the third category was based on the students' percentile score on the NWEA MAP test.

== Other high school options ==
In addition to the selective enrollment high schools, a number of other possibilities exist for high school students. These include military academies, career academies, and charter schools. Lincoln Park High School and Von Steuben Metropolitan Science Center are neighborhood "magnet" high schools, which also offer various honors programs to students citywide. More specialized options, such as the Chicago High School for the Arts and the Chicago High School for Agricultural Sciences are also available.

=== Military academies ===
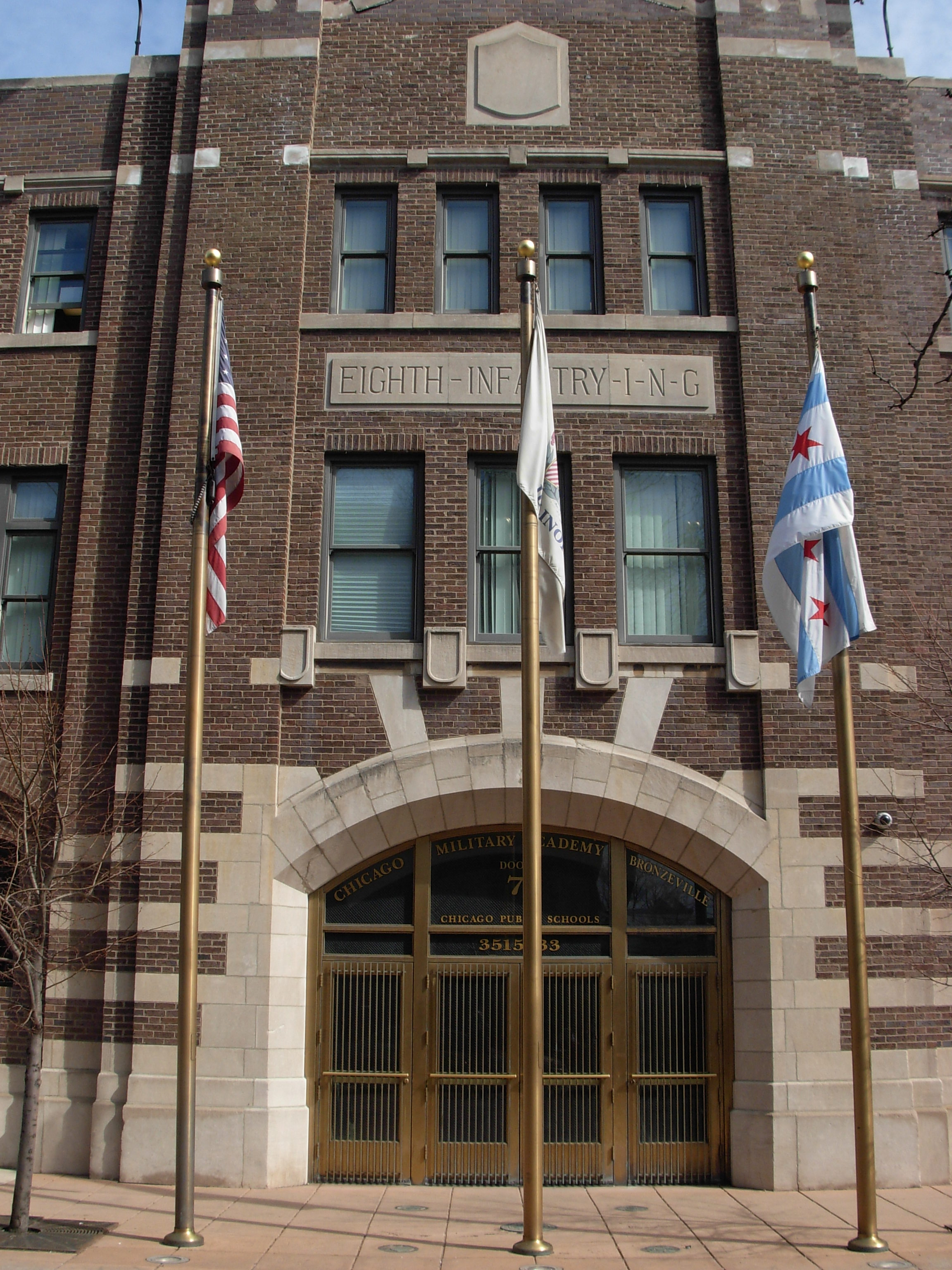
Chicago Military Academy at Bronzeville

In partnership with various Junior Reserve Officers' Training Corps programs, six high schools are operated as public military academies:

- Air Force Academy High School
- Carver Military Academy
- Chicago Military Academy at Bronzeville
- Marine Leadership Academy at Ames
- Phoenix Military Academy
- Rickover Naval Academy (selective enrollment)

=== Career academies ===
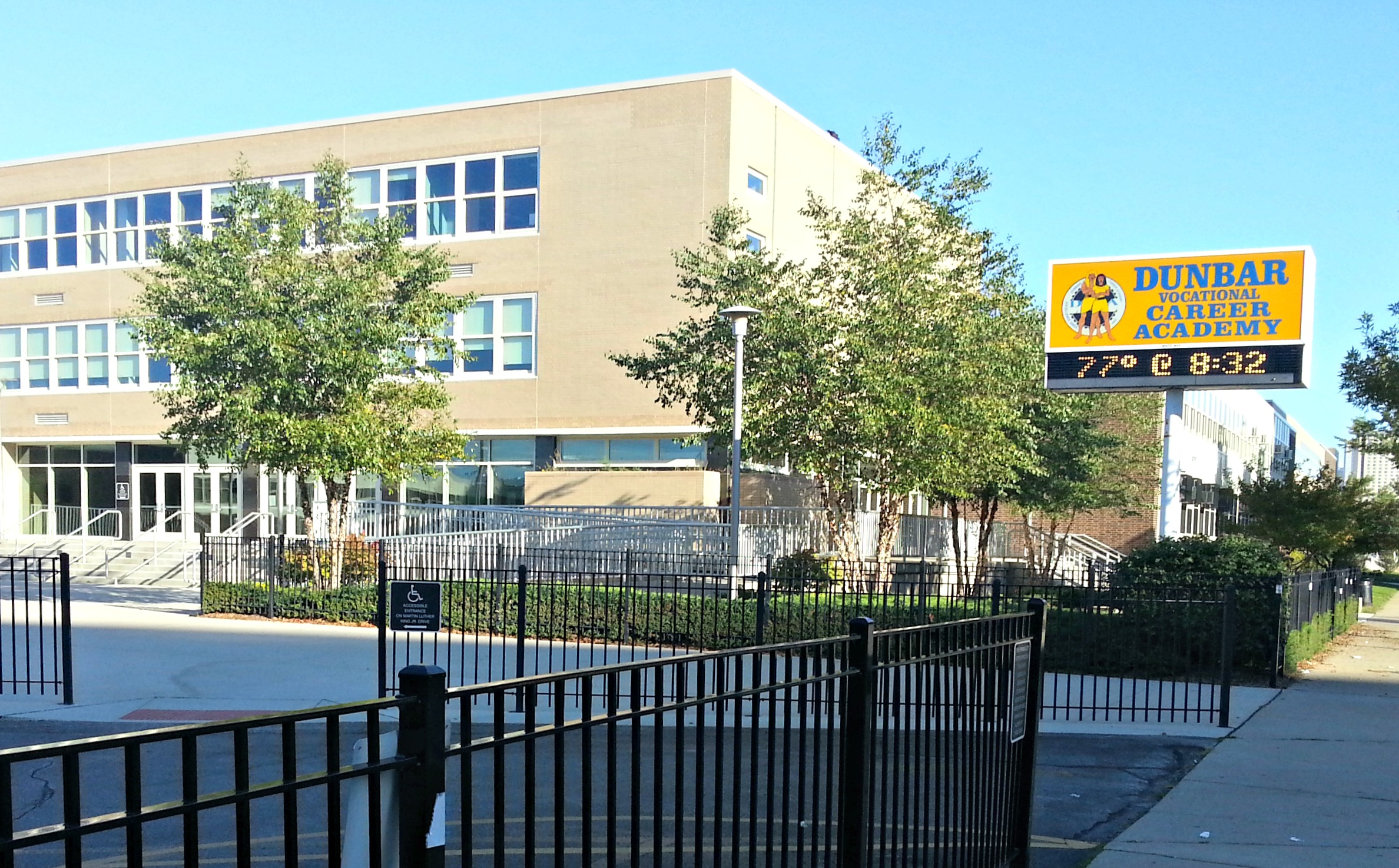
Dunbar Vocational Career Academy

Some high schools have been designated as "Career Academies." According to CPS, these schools have "intensified resources to prepare students for careers in business/finance, communications, construction, health, hospitality/food service, manufacturing, performing arts, and transportation. Vocational shops, science labs, broadcast journalism labs and media/computer centers help students gain 'hands on' experience."

- Austin Business and Entrepreneurship Academy
- Chicago Vocational Career Academy
- Dunbar Vocational Career Academy
- Prosser Career Academy
- Simeon Career Academy

== Charter schools ==
The Chicago district is responsible for 122 charter schools during the 2017–2018 school year. A variety of organizations run these schools. Frazier Preparatory Academy, for example, is sponsored by an independent board of directors and run by education management organization Pansophic Learning.

The Noble Network of Charter Schools runs eighteen high schools. These schools receive the majority of their operating budgets from the same tax sources as CPS. Charters in Chicago receive 10-25% less public funding than traditional schools, although some studies show their student achievement and performance metrics to be the same as traditional CPS results.

However, in October 2014, the University of Minnesota released a study that shows that Chicago charter schools perform worse than traditional schools in producing students that meet or exceed standards in reading and math. The study also showed that charter schools have lower graduation rates and "are much less likely to be racially or ethnically diverse."

In 2015, the Noble Network of Charter Schools was named the best performing large public charter school system in America by the Eli and Edythe Broad Foundation and was awarded $250,000 by the foundation.

== Operations ==
The structure of Chicago Public Schools was redefined after Mayor Richard M. Daley convinced the Illinois General Assembly to place CPS under the mayor's control. Illinois school districts are generally governed by locally elected school boards, where each district board hires a superintendent, who in turn hires administrators such as principals, who then must be approved by the school board. In contrast, CPS is headed by a Chief Executive Officer and school board appointed by the mayor. It is currently the only school district in Illinois where the school board is appointed by a city's mayor. The school board will transition to consist entirely of elected members by 2027.

CPS is headquartered in the 42 West Madison building in the Chicago Loop, formerly headquartered in the 125 South Clark Street building from 1998 until November 2014. The district has offices in Bridgeport, Colman, and Garfield Park. The 20 story building, managed by MB Real Estate, and originally built as the Commercial National Bank, has 570,910 square feet (53,039 m^{2}) of space.

=== Chief Executive Officer ===
CPS is headed by a chief executive officer (CEO) appointed by the mayor. The current CEO is Pedro Martinez.

The position of CEO, before it was created in 1995, was preceded by a position of "superintendent". In 1995, the Government of Illinois passed the Chicago School Reform Amendatory Act, which replaced the position of superintendent with that of chief executive Officer.

=== Chicago Board of Education ===
The school board, known as the Chicago Board of Education, is currently appointed by the mayor of Chicago. Between 2024 and 2027, the board is slated to transition to consist entirely of elected members.

The board traces its roots back to the Board of School Inspectors, created in 1837, which was renamed Chicago Board of Education in 1857.

The Chicago Board of Education is led by a president. The current president of the Chicago Board of Education is Sean Harden.

=== Local school councils ===
In 1988, the Government of Illinois passed the Chicago School Reform Act, which created Local School Councils.

== Performance ==
The April 21, 2006 issue of the Chicago Tribune revealed a study by the Consortium on Chicago School Research that stated that 6 of every 100 CPS freshmen would earn a bachelor's degree by age 25. 3 in 100 black or Latino men would earn a bachelor's degree by age 25. The study tracked Chicago high school students who graduated in 1998 and 1999. 35% of CPS students who went to college earned their bachelor's degree within six years, below the national average of 64%. Chicago has a history of high dropout rates, with around half of students failing to graduate for the past 30 years. Criticism is directed at the CPS for inflating its performance figures. Through such techniques as counting students who swap schools before dropping out as transfers but not dropouts, it publishes graduation claims as high as 71%. Nonetheless, throughout the 1990s actual rates seem to have improved slightly, as true graduation estimates rose from 48% in 1991 to 54% in 2004.

In 1987, Education Secretary William J. Bennett called the Chicago Public Schools system the worst in the nation. In September 2011, the University of Chicago's Consortium on Chicago School Research published a report on the school system's performance over the course of 30 years of reform. While the report evaluated three decades of reform, it measured the progress of such policies by "analyzing trends in elementary and high school test scores and graduation rates over the past 20 years." The authors of the report highlighted five of their central conclusions:

- "Graduation rates have improved dramatically, and high school test scores have risen; more students are graduating without a decline in average academic performance."
- "Math scores have improved incrementally in the elementary/middle grades, while elementary/middle grade reading scores remained fairly flat for two decades."
- "Racial gaps in achievement have steadily increased, with white students making slightly more progress than Latino students, and African American students falling behind all other groups."
- "Despite progress, the vast majority of CPS students have academic achievement levels that are far below where they need to be to graduate ready for college."
- "The publicly reported statistics used to hold schools and districts accountable for making academic progress are not accurate measures of progress."

However, In more recent years (post COVID19 pandemic), CPS has seen strong recovery, with a record 84.1% graduation rate for the 2024 school year. With graduation rates on the rise, CPS also had notable reading gains in 2024. While the 3rd-8th grade reading scores improved, significant achievement gaps had been noted to persist across racial and socioeconomic lines.

== Pension fund ==
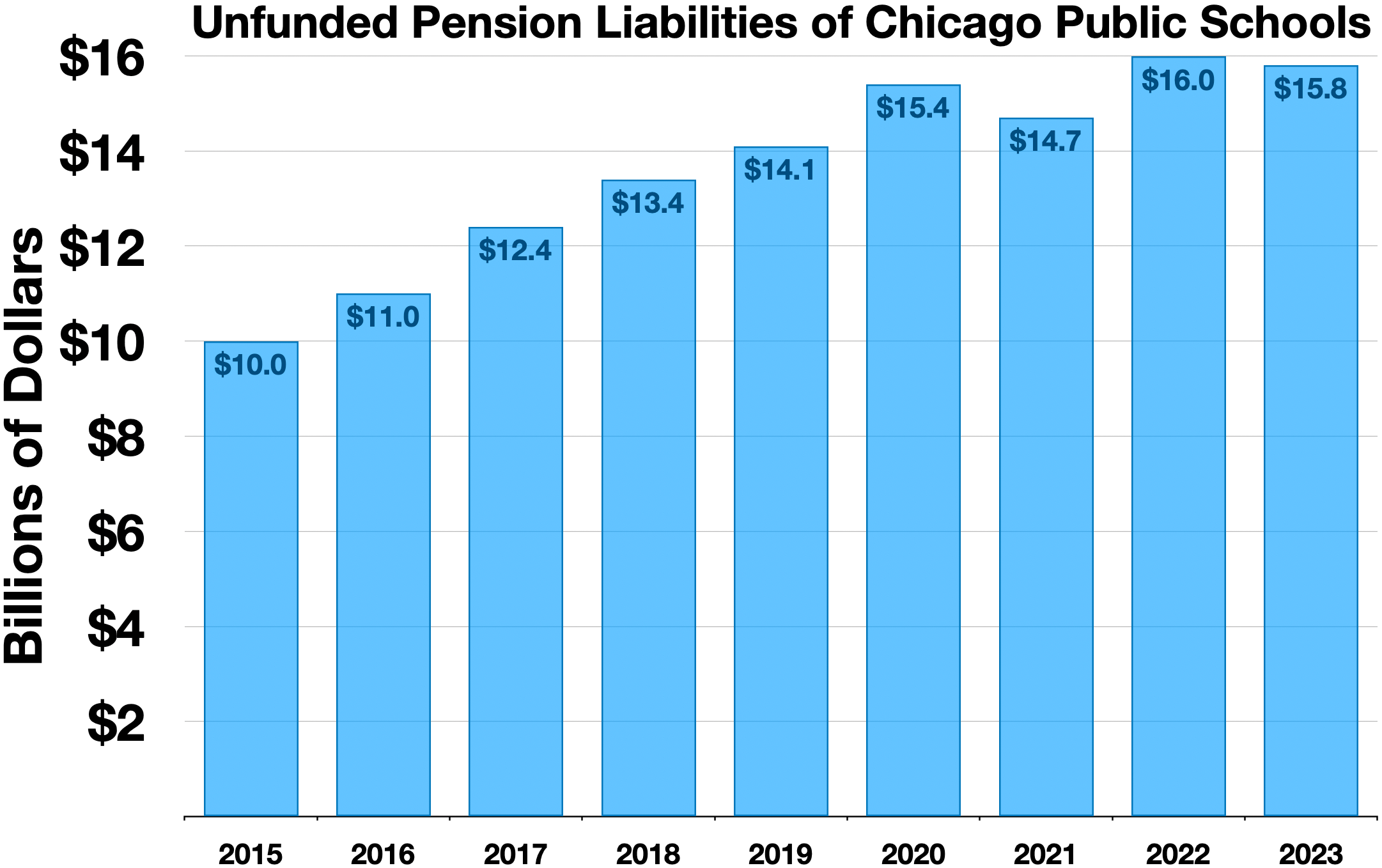
Unfunded pension liabilities of Chicago Public Schools

CPS provides pensions primarily through the Chicago Teachers’ Pension Fund (CTPF) for teachers and certain certified staff, and through the Municipal Employees’ Annuity and Benefit Fund (MEABF) for many non-teaching employees.

CTPF remains significantly underfunded. Its actuarial funded ratio was 48.1% as of June 30, 2024, and declined to 47.9% as of June 30, 2025, meaning it holds less than half of the assets needed to cover promised benefits. CPS follows a statutory “pension ramp” intended to raise CTPF’s funded ratio to 90% by 2059, which requires increasing annual contributions.

For fiscal year 2024, the total required employer contribution to CTPF was $1.0225 billion. The State of Illinois contributed approximately $322.7 million, while the remainder was funded through a dedicated CPS pension property tax levy and $142.7 million from CPS operating funds. CPS has indicated that operating revenues are expected to continue supporting these legacy pension costs into the 2040s.

== Political corruption ==
In 2014, the Office of the Inspector General (OIG) for Chicago Public schools received over 1300 complaints involving accusations of impropriety. Its subsequent 43-page report and audit noted that corruption and theft were still a major problem within CPS, detailing major theft of school funds, kickbacks to CPS employees, falsification of student transfer data, fraudulent selective enrollment applications, and ethics violations. In one particular case involving a half-dozen employees, almost $900,000 was stolen in what Inspector General Nicholas Schuler called a "major purchasing and reimbursement scheme". The schools involved were later identified as Gage Park Academy and Michele Clark Magnet High School. In response, CPS stated that it was committed to working with the OIG to address these issues.

By fiscal year 2023, the number of complaints for the same reasons rose to 2,075.

In April 2015, Barbara Byrd-Bennett, the CEO of Chicago Public Schools, took a leave of absence during a federal investigation of a no-bid contract to a professional development organization that she had previously worked for as a consultant. She resigned from the position in June 2015. In October a federal grand jury delivered a 23 count indictment against Bennett and alleged co-conspirators. Bennett would go on to plead guilty to a $23 million kickback scheme and was sentenced to 7 and a half years in prison.

In March 2016, CPS filed a $65 million civil lawsuit in Cook County Circuit Court against Byrd-Bennett, Gary Solomon, Thomas Vranas, SUPES Academy, and Synesi Associates. The suit sought treble damages (the right of the court to triple the amount of damages awarded) and other relief related to approximately $16–23 million in allegedly fraudulent contracts and associated costs.

In January 2016, the Office of the Inspector General for CPS again received over 1300 fraud complaints and issued another audit for 2015 which continued to highlight issues of corruption and theft. The 2015 audit reported the shakedown of a CPS vendor, a records falsification scheme by a principal, widespread selective enrollment fraud, illegal use of taxpayer-funded resources on political campaigns, theft from taxpayer-funded accounts intended for purchasing student materials, and numerous instances of abusing tax-exempt status to purchase personal items.

The Benito Juarez Community Academy shooting occurred on December 16, 2022, when two students were shot dead by an ex-student with gang ties.

== See also ==
- History of education in Chicago
- List of schools in Chicago Public Schools
- Chicago Manufacturing Renaissance Council
- Chicago Public High School League
- Chicago Teacher Education Pipeline
- Communities In Schools of Chicago
- Middle School Cadet Corps
- Renaissance 2010
