= Chicago Teachers Pension Fund =

Pension fund

The Chicago Teachers’ Pension Fund (CTPF) is a defined-benefit pension system for teachers and many certified staff in Chicago Public Schools. It was established under Illinois law and is governed by its own board of trustees. CTPF is separate from the statewide Teachers’ Retirement System, which serves teachers outside Chicago.

CTPF is funded through employee contributions, employer contributions from Chicago Public Schools (CPS), and dedicated state and local revenues. These include a special CPS property-tax levy that is set aside to help cover the district’s required employer pension payments.

CTPF remains significantly underfunded despite recent investment gains. Under Illinois law, it is on a long-term funding schedule designed to reach 90 percent funded status by 2059.

For fiscal year 2026, CPS projects a required employer contribution of about $1.03 billion. Of that amount, approximately $363 million is expected to come from the State of Illinois and about $664 million from CPS. Most of CPS’s share is projected to be covered by a dedicated pension property-tax levy. However, CPS must still transfer tens of millions of dollars each year from its operating budget to meet the full required contribution. The district expects to continue making such transfers until roughly the mid-2030s.

The combination of a large unfunded liability, increasing required contributions, and a relatively limited state cost share continues to place pressure on CPS’s finances. Funding for CTPF remains a central issue in debates over how Chicago’s school pensions should be supported in the long term.

== Investment performance ==
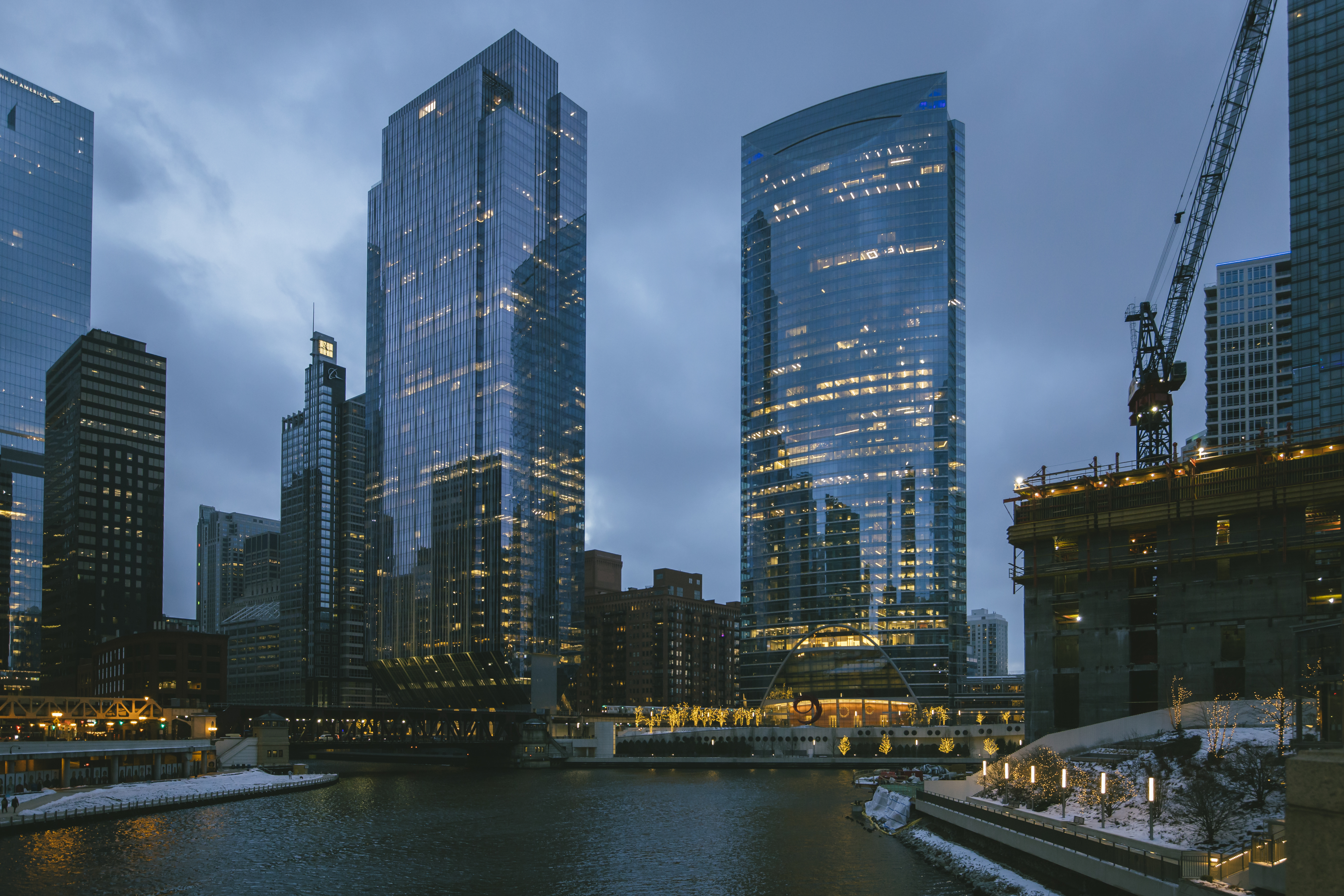
Chicago, Illinois

CTPF states that, over the long term, it has met or exceeded its actuarial return assumptions despite market volatility and funding challenges. According to a recent report, the fund reported a 12.1 percent return in fiscal year 2025 and 9.8 percent in 2024. It also reported five- and ten-year annualized returns of 9.7 percent and 8.1 percent, respectively, all above its current assumed rate of return of 6.5 percent.

Over a 35-year period, CTPF reports an average annual return of about 8.3 percent. The fund states that these returns have helped increase its assets to approximately $13.7 billion as of June 30, 2025, while it continues to pay about $1.7 billion per year in pensions and other benefits.

Supporters argue that the fund’s investment performance, together with its defined-benefit structure, has provided tens of thousands of Chicago educators with predictable, inflation-adjusted retirement income and survivor benefits. They contend that this outcome reflects the fund’s original purpose when it was established in 1895.

== Diversity, governance initiatives, and workplace culture ==
CTPF is noted for its work with diversity and emerging investment managers. In its 2025 Annual Diversity and Inclusion Report, the fund reported that 56.9 percent of its total assets, or about $7.6 billion, were invested with minority, women, and disabled-owned business enterprise (MWDBE) firms. It stated that it uses both direct investment mandates and “manager-of-managers” programs to include new firms, with some later transitioning to direct mandates. The fund and its trustees have received industry recognition for these efforts and for maintaining continuous operations for 130 years, during which its assets have grown from a small initial pool to a multi-billion-dollar, globally diversified portfolio.

Internally, CTPF has also been certified as a “Great Place to Work” for three consecutive years. According to employee survey results cited by the fund, more than 90 percent of employees rated it as an excellent workplace.

== Criticisms and controversies ==
Criticism of the CTPF generally falls into three categories: its long-term underfunding and effect on CPS finances, the design of its benefits, and issues related to governance, transparency, and investments.

=== Underfunding and taxpayer impact ===
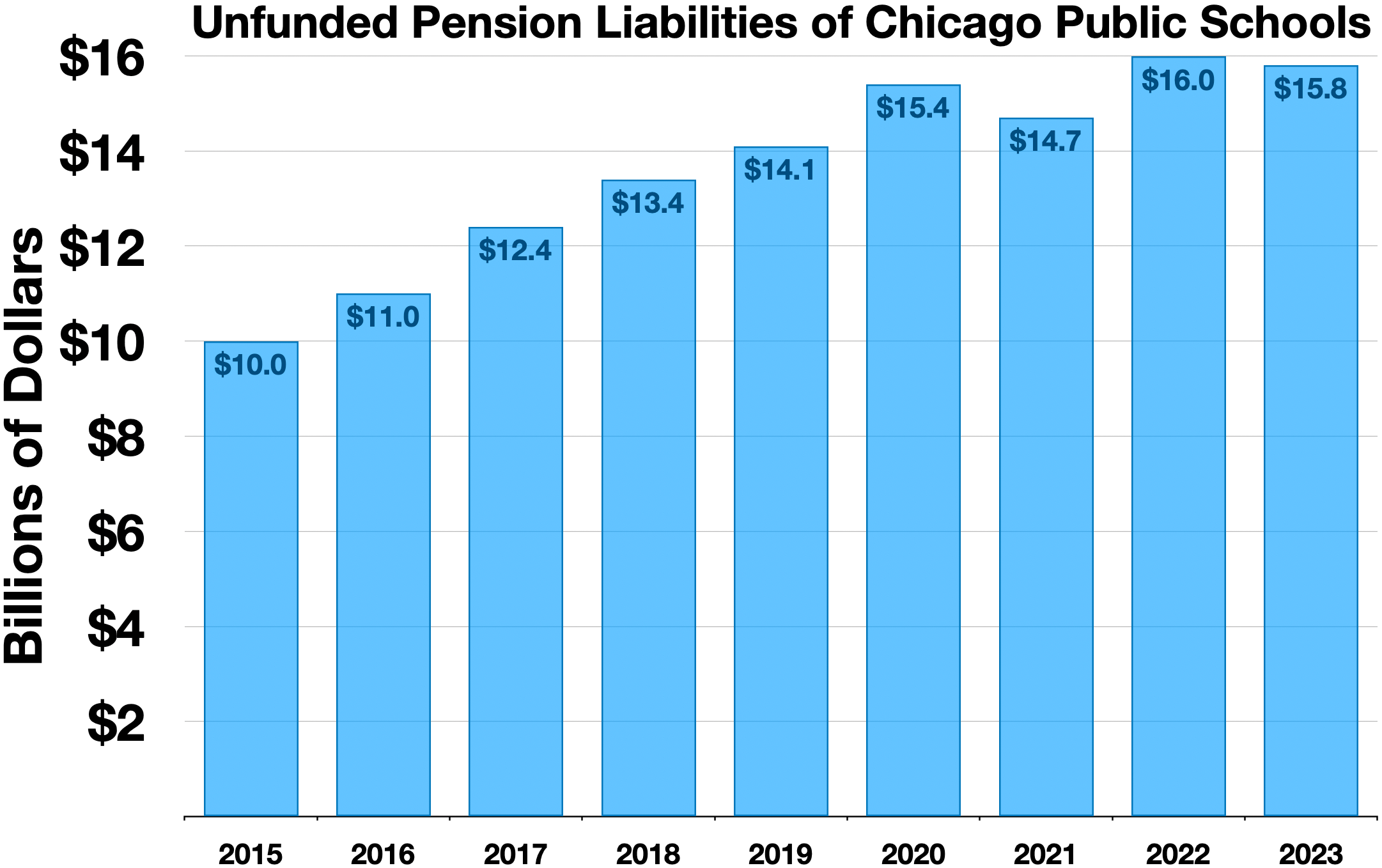
Unfunded pension liabilities of Chicago public schools (2015-2023)

Analysts from a range of perspectives describe CTPF as significantly underfunded, with a funded ratio below 50 percent and an unfunded liability in the tens of billions of dollars. Critics attribute the shortfall to factors including past “pension holidays,” statutory under-contributions, benefit increases, and actuarial assumptions that they consider overly optimistic. They argue that these practices shifted costs to future taxpayers and contributed to the fund’s current financial position, despite strong market returns in recent years.

Because CPS, unlike most other Illinois school districts, is responsible for covering the majority of its own pension costs, some watchdog groups contend that rising required contributions require the district to redirect funds from its operating budget. They argue that this structure increases financial pressure on current students and city taxpayers to finance previously promised benefits.

=== Benefit structure and equity for teachers ===
Some researchers and advocacy groups argue that CTPF’s benefit structure favors long-term “career” teachers over short- and mid-tenure educators. Under current rules, teachers generally must work ten years to vest. Those who leave earlier typically receive a refund of their contributions rather than an employer-funded retirement benefit.

Analyses of “Tier 2” members, hired after 2011, indicate that they contribute about 9 percent of salary, while the normal cost of their benefits is estimated at roughly 8 to 9 percent. Some analysts conclude that certain newer teachers may contribute more than the actuarial value of the benefits they ultimately receive. Critics describe this structure as a “pension trap” that may limit job mobility and disadvantage teachers who do not remain in Chicago Public Schools for a full career. Some have proposed hybrid or defined-contribution plans as alternatives that could offer more portable benefits.

=== Governance, transparency, and investment controversies ===
CTPF has also faced criticism related to governance and investment practices. Civic watchdogs and some trustees have raised concerns about budgeting transparency, external management and consulting fees, and the level of disclosure surrounding investment decisions and contracts.

A trustee-led effort to conduct a forensic audit cited concerns about potential conflicts of interest, “hidden and excessive fees,” and possible breaches of fiduciary duty, though not all details or subsequent actions have been publicly disclosed. Some commentators argue that investment performance below benchmarks, together with fees and governance concerns, has contributed to the fund’s financial challenges and increased long-term costs for CPS and taxpayers.

== See also ==
- Chicago Board of Education
- Chicago Public Schools
- Illinois Teachers Retirement System
- Pension fund
