= Hawker Beechcraft =

Defunct American aircraft manufacturer

Hawker Beechcraft Corporation
- Type: Private
- Industry: Aerospace
- Founded: 2006
- Defunct: February 19, 2013
- Fate: Succeeded by Beechcraft Corporation upon emerging from bankruptcy on February 19, 2013
- Headquarters: Wichita, Kansas, United States
- Key people: Steve Miller, CEO
- Products: General aviation aircraft Business jets
- Number of employees: 8000 worldwide, 6300 US headquarters (2010)
- Parent: Goldman Sachs and Onex Corporation
- Website: www.hawkerbeechcraft.com

Hawker Beechcraft Corporation (HBC) was an American aerospace manufacturing company that built the Beechcraft and Hawker business jet lines of aircraft between 2006 and 2013. The company headquarters was in Wichita, Kansas, United States, with maintenance and manufacturing locations worldwide. The history of Hawker Beechcraft originated in 1994 when Raytheon merged its Beech Aircraft Corporation and Raytheon Corporate Jets units.

In 2006, Raytheon sold the company to a consortium of Goldman Sachs and Onex Corporation. This deal left the company with a heavy burden of debt which it struggled to support from the economic crisis of 2008 onwards. In April 2012 it defaulted on interest payments and was in breach of banking covenants; this caused widespread speculation that it would enter bankruptcy.

On May 3, 2012, the company entered bankruptcy, filing voluntary petitions under Chapter 11 in US Bankruptcy Court. The bankruptcy resulted in the company accepting an offer to be purchased by Superior Aviation Beijing. By October 18, 2012, the negotiations for the sale had failed and the company decided to cease jet production and exited bankruptcy on its own on February 19, 2013, under a new name, Beechcraft Corporation.

== History ==
On February 8, 1980, Beech Aircraft Corporation became a subsidiary of Raytheon. In August 1993, Raytheon Company acquired British Aerospace Corporate Jets (producers of the midsized British Aerospace BAe 125 line) from British Aerospace and renamed the company Raytheon Corporate Jets. In mid-September 1994, Beech Aircraft Corporation and Raytheon Corporate Jets were merged to form Raytheon Aircraft. Raytheon decided to use the Hawker name to show the lineage of the series from Hawker Siddeley and Hawker Aircraft.

=== 2000s ===
In early 2002, Raytheon announced the return of the Hawker and Beechcraft brands after having marketed them as Raytheon aircraft at the National Business Aviation Association annual convention.

Raytheon announced in July 2006 the sale of its aircraft manufacturing business to focus on its core defense-related business. Bidders for the company included The Carlyle Group, Cerberus Capital Management and Onex Corporation.

In October 2006, Raytheon Aircraft Company commenced a US$16.3-million 112,000-square-foot (10,400 m^{2}) facility expansion for Hawker 4000 completion work in Little Rock, Arkansas. The expansion included a new 54,000-square-foot (5,000 m^{2}) hangar bay, as well as extensions to existing buildings to provide additional woodshop, upholstery, sheet metal and storage space.

In March 2007, the purchase of Raytheon Aircraft Company was finalised at US$3.3B. Hawker Beechcraft Inc. was a new company formed by Onex Partners and Goldman Sachs Alternatives. It operated under the name Hawker Beechcraft Corporation (HBC).

2007 marked the 75th anniversary of Beechcraft and the 60th anniversary of the Beechcraft Bonanza, which is the longest running production line of all time.

In 2007 and 2008, the company increased its overseas expansion efforts. On October 25, 2007, HBC officially opened a new aerospace manufacturing facility in Chihuahua, Mexico and, on March 26, 2010, appointed Hawker Pacific Singapore as its first Hawker 4000 authorized service center in Southeast Asia.

=== Late-2000s recession ===
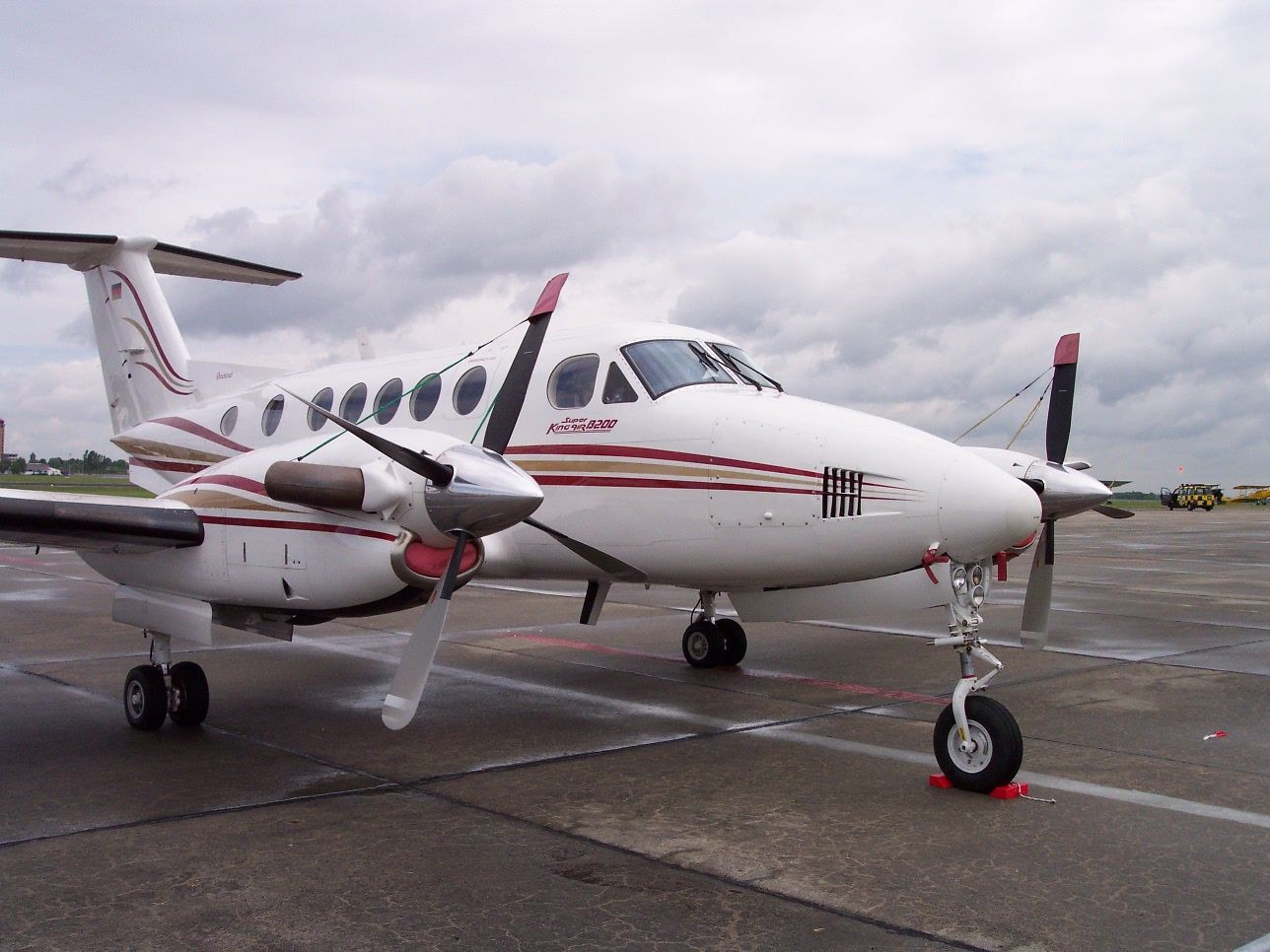
Beechcraft Super King Air

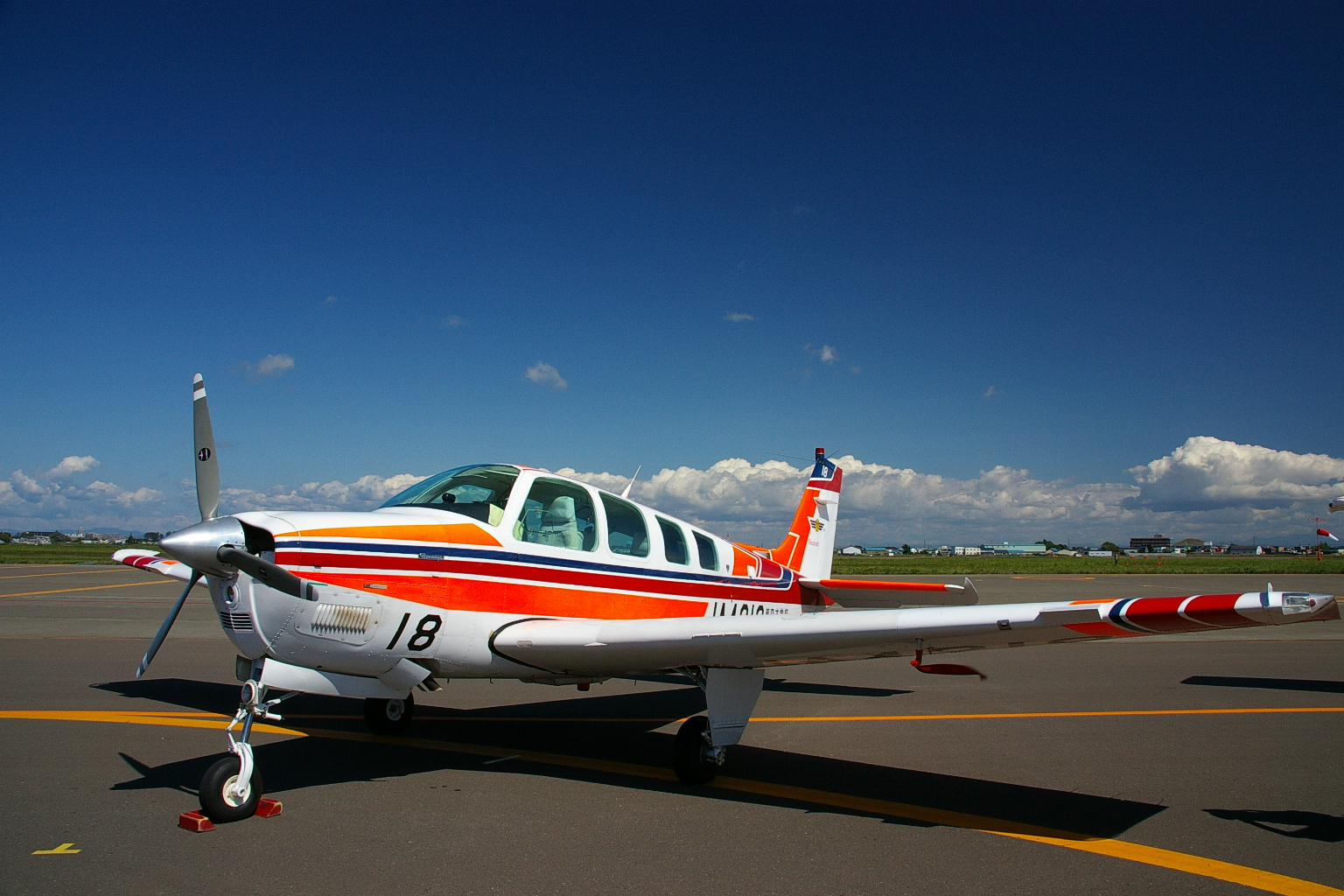
Beechcraft A36 Bonanza

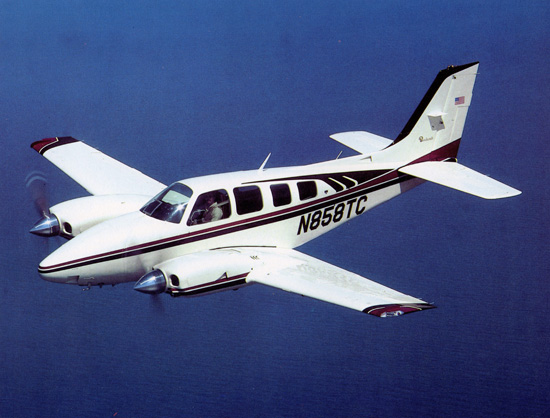
Beechcraft 58TC Baron

In response to the late-2000s recession the company announced the lay-off of 490 employees at its Wichita facility in January 2009.

On February 3, 2009, CEO Jim Schuster announced that a further 2,300 employees would be laid off before the end of the year. The company indicated that orders for aircraft had slowed down, especially by fractional jet operators. Schuster said:

The government's stimulus package has failed to sufficiently loosen credit markets, which are absolutely vital to the success of HBC and our industry...The media and some politicians have cast general aviation as a wasteful extravagance instead of a critical business tool and the source of millions of American jobs...This is an extremely painful step for the HBC family and community, but one that is absolutely necessary. While I wish I could commit to you that this will be our final action, I cannot do so at this time given the extreme volatility in the marketplace.

After completing cuts of 25% of its workforce (2800 employees) between October 2008 and August 2009, the company indicated that further significant cuts were required. The company's second quarter 2009 results over 2008 data showed that aircraft deliveries had fallen from 129 to 78 aircraft. The company achieved orders of US$450M during the period April to June 2009, but had orders totalling US$366M cancelled in the same period. Overall the company's sales were reduced from US$1.03B in the second quarter of 2008 to US$816.3M in the same period of 2009. One customer, NetJets, cancelled orders for 12 aircraft and deferred all other scheduled deliveries until the end of 2010.

By late August 2009, the company laid off an additional 300 workers, bringing the total number of layoffs to 3100. On August 31, 2009, the company indicated that it was slowing development of the Beechcraft Premier II, moving its first delivery date into late 2012 or early 2013 due to the poor market for business aircraft. In late September 2009 the company issued 60-day lay-off notices for another 240 employees. These cuts included 87 positions on the Horizon production line and the rest in the King Air line. This set of lay-offs brought the total lay-offs to 3,553 since October 2008, which was about 36 percent of the company workforce.

The company reported that it lost more than US$63M in the first quarter of 2010, even after it cut 2,700 jobs in 2009. In July 2010 the union representing workers at Hawker Beechcraft sent a letter to its members explaining that it was in negotiations at the company's request to deal with, as the company stated "serious challenges... a spectrum of possibilities for the company's future footprint...the likely impact on its workforce in all its locations." The union warned its members in the letter, "The picture we are getting is of a Hawker Beechcraft Wichita that will shrink almost immediately by 75 percent or more within two years, without a guarantee of even the last few jobs staying". The move would reduce the company's work force from 6000 to 1500 workers. CEO Bill Boisture confirmed the situation indicating that demand for the company's products had declined drastically and permanently and that the company may move significant amounts of work to Mississippi, Louisiana, or even outside the United States.

In September 2010 the company announced further cuts of 350 salaried positions to be completed by the end of October 2010. On October 16, 2010, union machinists at Hawker Beechcraft voted against a new seven-year contract that would have included a 10% pay cut and higher worker health insurance contributions aimed at keeping the company from moving its operations out of Kansas. Union leadership had recommended that its rank and file accept the company's offer rather than risk losing their jobs, but a majority of the union workers voted against the contract, citing their belief that the company will leave Kansas regardless of incentives and concessions. In December 2010 the company signed an agreement with the Kansas state government to retain facilities in Wichita until at least 2020 and a minimum of 4000 employees in exchange for a US$40M incentive package. Kansas Governor Mark Parkinson termed it "not a huge bailout".

=== 2010s bankruptcy and restructuring ===
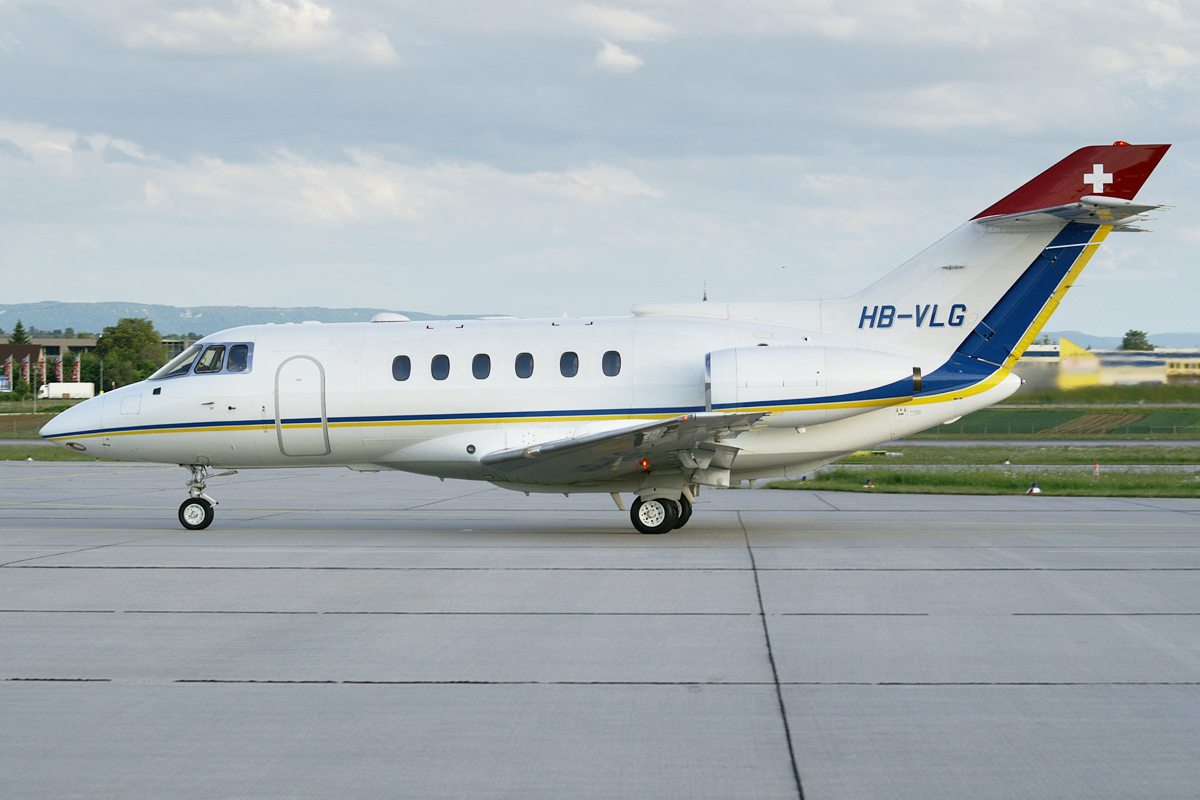
Hawker 800

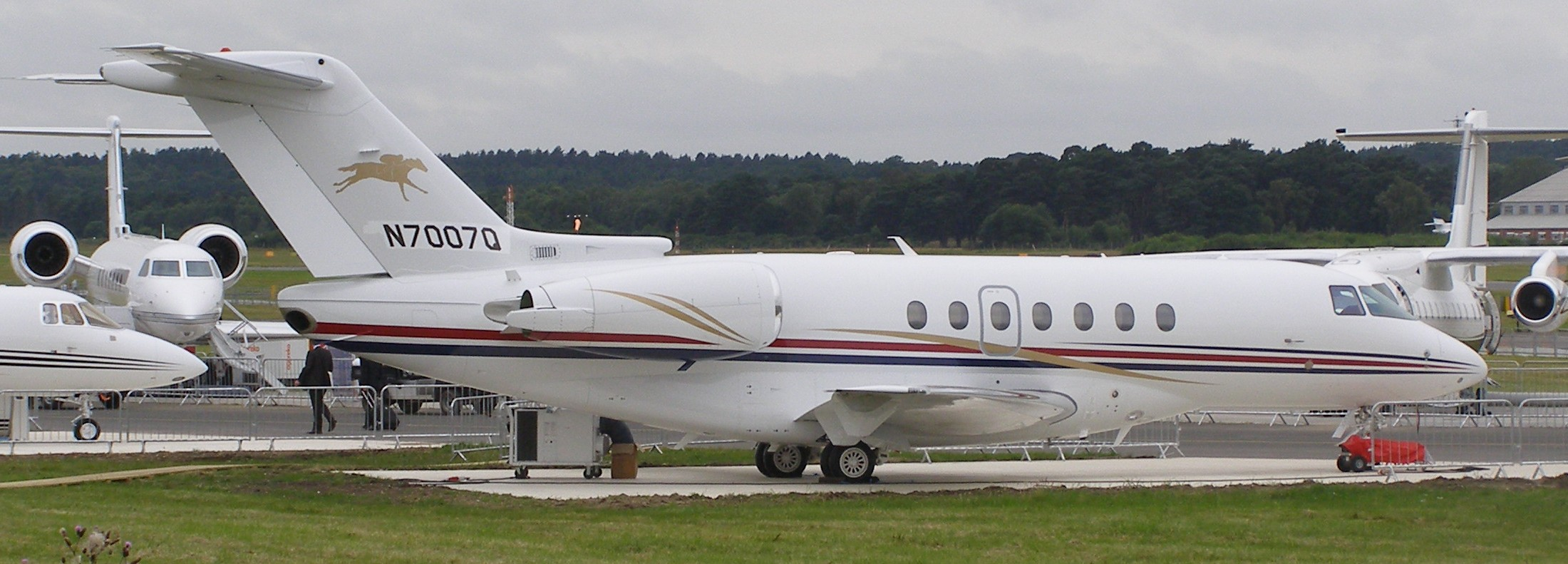
Hawker 4000

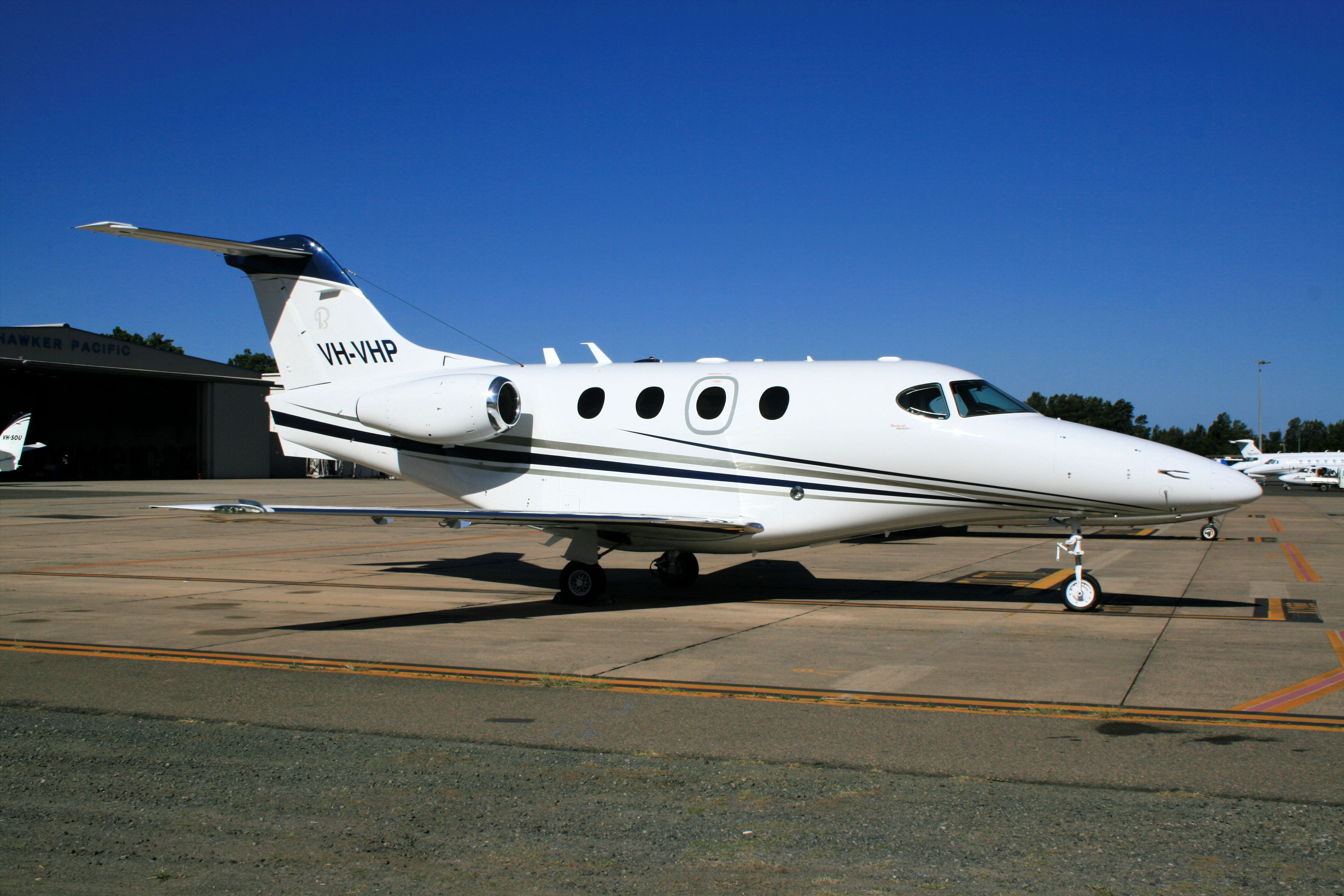
Beechcraft Premier I

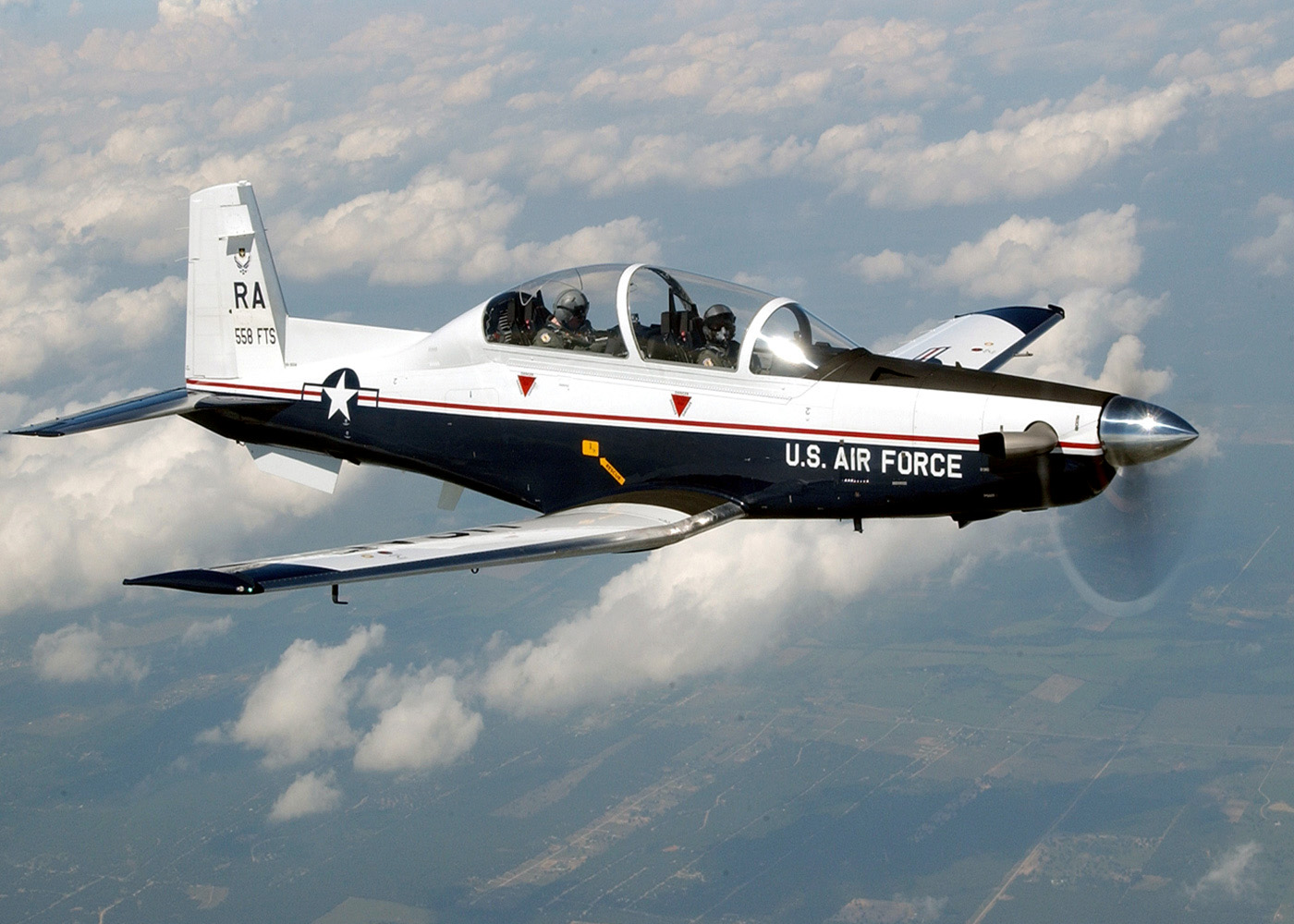
Beechcraft T-6 Texan II

In early 2010, the company, in partnership with FlightSafety International, opened the 44,000 sq ft (4,100 m^{2}) Maintenance Learning Center, for technician training.

By September 2011, the company had US$2.14 billion of debt outstanding. In December 2011, the company announced that it was slowing down development of the Hawker 200 jet due to the uncertain state of the economy. CEO Bill Boisture indicated the program was not canceled, saying that the aircraft program is "well positioned to continue...when the time is right." The company also announced that it was looking for relief from payments on a US$182 million revolving line of credit, due to the general poor economic conditions and low sales of light jets. The company was close to defaulting, but Sam Goodyear, an analyst at CreditSights predicted that the lenders would rearrange the debt rather than force the company to liquidate, as their return in the prevailing market conditions would be poor.

In January 2012, the company's Beechcraft AT-6 lost out to Embraer's Tucano in a competition to supply 20 light attack jets to Afghanistan. This contract has since been cancelled due to mistakes in the paperwork and Hawker Beechcraft challenged the deal in court.

The company underwent management changes in February 2012, with CEO Bill Boisture becoming chairman of the company's operating subsidiary Hawker Beechcraft Corp. The board of directors named company turn-around expert Steve Miller as the new CEO.

In March 2012, the general media began carrying stories that the company would have to soon enter bankruptcy, even though the new CEO Miller had indicated he would work hard to avoid that. In February 2012 Miller had said, "My assignment is to figure out how to get through these financial headwinds without even having to think about Chapter 11 filing. Chapter 11 doesn’t do anybody any good. It’s usually not necessary." Some financial analysts indicated that with so much debt and low share prices that the owners, Onex and Goldman's share in the company may well now be zero. Some analysts indicated that bankruptcy was inevitable. Scott Chan, an analyst with Canaccord Genuity in Toronto stated, "Unless things turn around, this company could go bankrupt soon. Time is running out." Another analyst added, "I think everybody is pretty sure it’s when, not if."

On March 27, 2012, the company struck a deal for $120m of interim financing to give it time to recapitalize the company. Lenders holding about 70 percent of its bank debt agreed to waive covenants on that debt, and defer interest payments until June 29, 2012. The following day Reuters reported rumours that the company was negotiating a prearranged bankruptcy "within the next several weeks" to include debtor-in-possession (DIP) financing of less than $500M. On March 30, the company failed to pay interest on its secured credit facility, which Standard & Poors considered a "selective default" and on April 2 it failed to pay $28 million of interest on its unsecured and subordinated notes, which S&P rated as a full default. Hawker also reported that it had breached banking covenants and had failed to file its 10-K for 2011 on time because of problems with its internal financial reporting systems.

In April 2012, the company filed its delayed year-end report with the U.S. Securities and Exchange Commission. The filing stated that "management has concluded that there is substantial doubt about the Company’s ability to continue as a going concern...Due to the fact that we have recurring negative cash flows from operations and recurring losses from operations, we will need to seek additional financing. There is substantial doubt that we will be able to obtain additional equity or debt financing on favorable terms, or at all, in order to have sufficient liquidity to meet our cash requirements for the next twelve months." The company reported that it had lost over US$1B in the previous two years, had US$2.3B in debt and had already missed some interest payments. The SEC filing also stated that the company might sell off assets and equity, renegotiate its debt and may have to enter Chapter 11 bankruptcy to resolve its problems. CEO Miller stated that the company will "decide on a path forward for Hawker Beechcraft that will include a plan that will put the company on firm financial footing and better position Hawker Beechcraft for the future."

On May 3, 2012, the company filed for Chapter 11 bankruptcy after having laid off 350 employees in late April.

By mid-June 2012, the company had filed court documents outlining plans to emerge from bankruptcy. The company plan involved retaining its piston-engined and turboprop aircraft lines and reducing or eliminating its jet aircraft lines. Three different scenarios were considered, all of which involved stopping development of the Beechcraft Premier and Hawker 200. One possibility was eliminating all jet production, a second was to retain the Hawker 900 and Hawker 4000, while the third was to retain only the 900. There was also a stated possibility that the company would be purchased by third party interests as well.

By early July 2012, bankruptcy court filings indicated the company was for sale, saying "the Debtors are continuing to evaluate potential sale alternatives and may elect to incorporate one or more sale or plan sponsorship transactions into the plan." From a list of 35 potential buyers, six had expressed serious interest in purchasing the company's assets. At the same time the company laid off a further 125 workers, bringing the total to 906.

On July 9, 2012, the company accepted an offer of purchase for US$1.79 billion by China-based Superior Aviation Beijing, a holding company in part owned by E-Town, an economic development agency of the municipal government of Beijing, subject to completing the sale agreement within 45 days and regulatory approvals. The sale agreement did not include the subsidiary Hawker Beechcraft Defense Co., builder of the T-6 trainer and AT-6 light attack aircraft. Chairman Bill Boisture stated: "The decision to move forward with Superior was based on two key factors. The bid for the company was the most attractive we received during the strategic review process and the going-forward plan offered the most continuity for our business, allowing us to preserve jobs, product lines and our ability to maintain our commitments to our customers." On July 17, 2012 the bankruptcy court judge granted the company approval to enter the exclusive period of negotiation with Superior Aviation, calling the arrangement a sound exercise of the company's business judgement. The 45-day period included US$50M in interim financing from Superior.

Aviation analysts reacted to the announced deal with skepticism, indicating that the purchase price seemed high for a company with an old product line and little recent investment in research and development. Textron, the owner of Cessna, indicated that it may be interested in acquiring the company if the deal with Superior was not completed.

On July 16, 2012, the International Association of Machinists and Aerospace workers (IAM), which represents some 3,500 of the company's 18,000 employees, filed in bankruptcy court an objection to the proposed deal with Superior, warning that the sale had "broad implications for the U.S. economy and national security," and contending that Superior's proposal excludes the assumption of Hawker's three pension plans, which the Pension Benefit Guaranty Corporation estimated to be underfunded by about $751 million at that time.

In late July 2012, during the bankruptcy proceedings senior management applied to the court for bonuses to be paid to themselves. The judge approved US$1.9M for 31 senior managers, but deferred a decision on a further US$5.3M in bonuses for the top eight executives until August 6, 2012. Senior managers said they were entitled to the bonuses because guiding the sale of the bankrupt company was difficult and time consuming.

On October 18, 2012, multiple sources reported that the negotiations between Superior Aviation Beijing and Hawker Beechcraft had failed, with a press release from Hawker Beechcraft ascribing the failure to the fact that "the proposed transaction with Superior could not be completed on terms acceptable to the company." Specific problems included national security concerns as "the company's defense operations were integrated with its civilian businesses that proved difficult to untangle", and legal complications, as "advisers in the US had trouble negotiating with Chinese representatives unfamiliar with US finance and bankruptcy law." In response to the failed negotiations, Hawker Beechcraft planned to emerge from bankruptcy protection by filing an amended Joint Plan of Reorganization (POR) with the US Bankruptcy Court for the Southern District of New York, and re-emerge as a stand-alone company renamed Beechcraft Corporation and focused on growing the company's most profitable products. A letter from company Chairman, Bill Boisture and Executive Vice-President Shawn Vick stated that their aim is to carry out the reorganization "in a strong operational and financial position." They wrote that this may result in ceasing jet production in favor of piston aircraft manufacturing or refurbishing older aircraft, indicating these "have high growth potential." At the end of October 2012 Vick confirmed that the company would end jet production in favor of a new single-engine turboprop based on the Beechcraft Premier fuselage.

The news of the company's planned cessation of jet production produced a great deal of negative reaction from owners of existing HBC-produced jets, who feared that parts and other support would be hard to get, reducing the value of their aircraft.

In early November 2012, the company announced that it would lay off more than 400 of its remaining workers. The cuts included the closure of its service facilities in Little Rock, Arkansas, Mesa, Arizona and San Antonio, Texas as well as other cuts in Wichita. At the same time the company affirmed that future work would concentrate "on turboprop, piston, special mission and trainer/attack aircraft, as well as our parts, maintenance, repairs and refurbishment businesses."

In late November 2012, the company made application to the bankruptcy court to sell off 20 Hawker 4000s, comprising 13 finished new 4000s, three being built and four used aircraft, at heavily discounted prices to raise money for the company. Existing owners of the aircraft type objected, indicating that this move would greatly devalue their assets. Bankruptcy judge Stuart Bernstein rejected the sale, stating that Hawker Beechcraft had not made a case for the discounted sale being necessary. On December 11, 2012 the judge reversed the order and permitted the sale of the 20 aircraft to proceed, requiring that each sale be reported to the court.

In early December 2012, the court approved a company restructuring including US$525M in term loans and a revolving line of credit, selling the jet production line and renaming the company Beechcraft Corporation. Of the credit, US$400M was used to pay off bankruptcy credit and the balance used for operations.

By early January 2013, the company had agreed to let the Pension Benefit Guaranty Corporation, a United States government agency, take over two under-funded company pension plans with liabilities of US$1B, paving the way for a group of hedge funds to buy the company. HBC will continue to fund the pensions.

On January 25, 2013, the company announced plans to emerge from bankruptcy, including US$600M in exit financing from JPMorgan and Credit Suisse. The company plan was given final court approval on January 31, 2013. The company named a new board of directors; Bill Boisture once again became CEO of the new Beechcraft Corporation and former CEO Steve Miller became a senior adviser to the board.

The company completed its bankruptcy on February 19, 2013, as a new company, Beechcraft Corporation, the Hawker Beechcraft name being retired. The new and much smaller company will produce the King Air line of aircraft as well as the T-6 and AT-6 military trainer/attack aircraft and the piston-powered single-engined Bonanza and twin-engined Baron aircraft. The jet line was discontinued, but the new company continued to support the aircraft already produced with parts and with engineering and airworthiness documentation.

The new company was acquired in 2014 by Textron Aviation, under which the Beechcraft brand name survives.

== Facilities ==
- Chester, United Kingdom
- Little Rock, Arkansas, United States
- Salina, Kansas, United States
- Wichita, Kansas, United States (headquarters)
- Chihuahua, Mexico
- Atlanta, Georgia, United States

== Products ==
=== Civil ===
==== Piston-propeller ====
- Beechcraft Baron
- Beechcraft Bonanza

==== Turboprop ====
- Beechcraft King Air
- Beechcraft Super King Air
- Beechcraft 1900 Airliner

==== Jet ====
- Beechcraft Premier I
- Hawker 200
- Hawker 400XP
- Hawker 750
- Hawker 850XP
- Hawker 900XP
- Hawker 1000
- Hawker 4000

=== Military ===
- C-12 Huron
- T-1 Jayhawk
- T-6 Texan II/CT-156 Harvard II

== See also ==
- Beechcraft
- Raytheon Aircraft
- Textron Aviation
