= Steve Miller (automotive industry executive) =

American businessman

Robert Steven Miller Jr.
- Born: November 4, 1941 (age 84); United States
- Education: Stanford Graduate School of Business (MBA) and Harvard Law School
- Occupation: Businessman
- Known for: CEO of several major US manufacturing businesses
- Spouse(s): Margaret Kyger (m. 1966–2006), Jill Jablonsk (m. 2007)

Robert Steven "Steve" Miller Jr. is an American businessman. He was chief executive officer of Hawker Beechcraft from 2012 to 2013, non-executive chairman at American International Group and on the board of directors at Symantec. He has served as Chairman of the Board of Purdue Pharma, Inc. since July 1, 2018.

== Early life education ==
Robert Miller holds an MBA from Stanford Graduate School of Business and an LLB from Harvard Law School.

== Career ==
He began his career at Ford Motor Company in 1968 and worked for the company in various positions in the U.S., Mexico, Australia, and Venezuela. He was recruited to the Chrysler Corporation by Lee Iacocca in 1979. While with Chrysler in the 1980s, he was the executive in charge of arranging with hundreds of banks the U.S. Government insured program of loans that enabled Chrysler to avoid bankruptcy and become an industrial powerhouse under the leadership of Iacocca. Miller has also worked for Bethlehem Steel, Morrison-Knudson and Federal-Mogul. He was the final CEO of Bethlehem Steel and led them through their bankruptcy in 2001 and the sale of the company's assets to International Steel Group in 2003.

He became Chief Executive Officer of Delphi Corporation in July 2005 and was also Executive Chairman. While at Delphi he presided over a restructuring of the company while it was going through bankruptcy. He left Delphi in October 2009. American International Group named Miller as their chairman in July 2010.

He was named CEO of Hawker Beechcraft in February 2012 in an attempt to reverse that company's fortunes and CEO of International Automotive Components in Aug 2015.

=== Personal life ===
He was married to Margaret "Maggie" Kyger for nearly forty years, who died of brain cancer on August 11, 2006, at the age of 69, at Beaumont Hospital in Royal Oak, Michigan. Miller later married Jill Jablonski, age 49, on September 15, 2007 in Dearborn, Michigan. Jablonski is a director of the Society of Automotive Engineers - Detroit Section.

== Bibliography ==
- The Turnaround Kid (2008)

Business positions
Preceded by Harvey Golub	Non-executive chairman of AIG; 2010–	Succeeded by incumbent
Preceded by Bill Boisture	CEO of Hawker Beechcraft; 2012–	Succeeded by incumbent
