= Hawker 4000 =

American business jet

Hawker 4000 Horizon
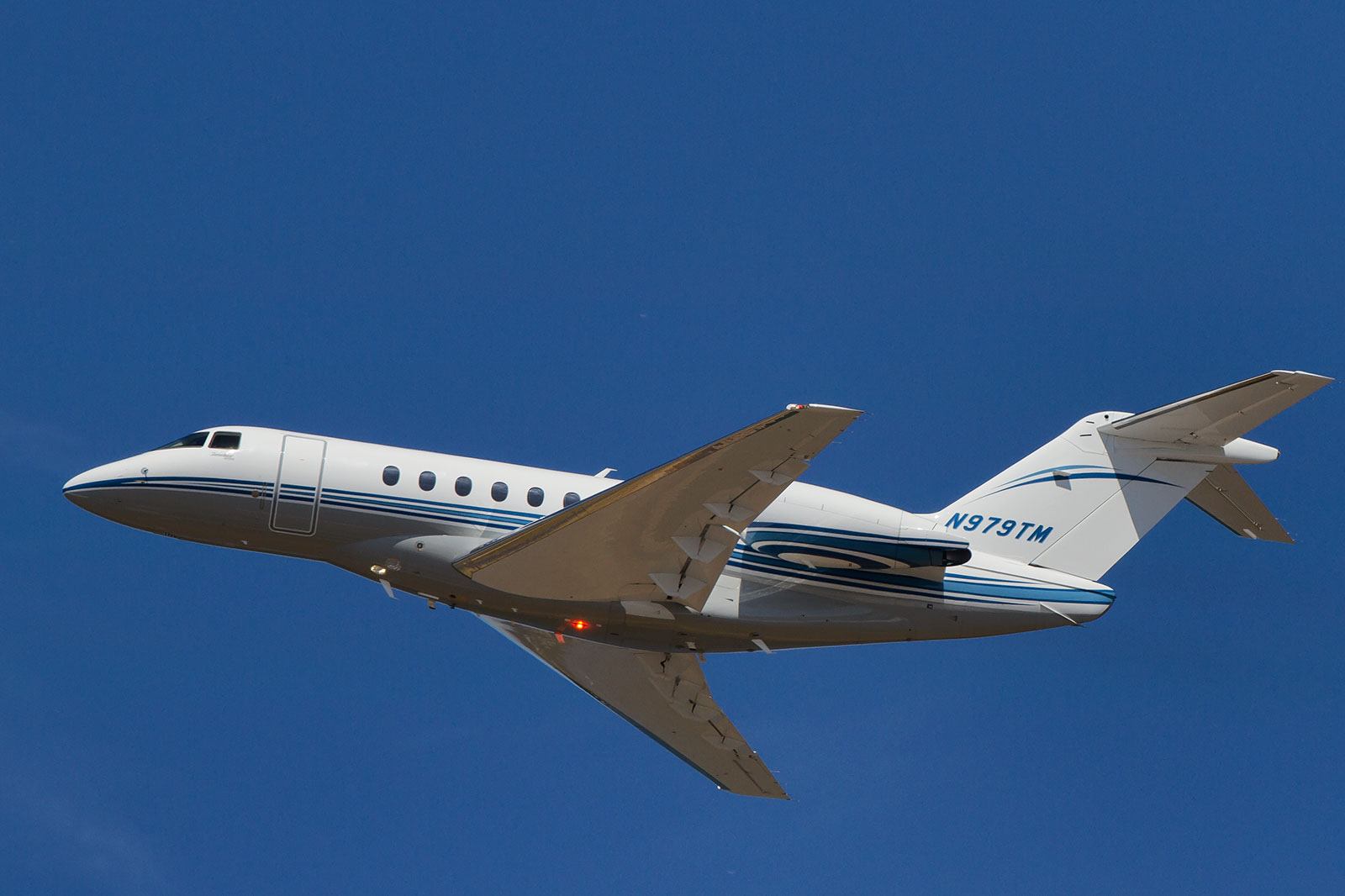
- Hawker 4000 taking off

General information
- Type: Business jet
- Manufacturer: Hawker Beechcraft; Raytheon Aircraft Company
- Status: Active Service
- Number built: 73

History
- Manufactured: 2001-2013
- First flight: 11 August 2001

The Hawker 4000, originally known as the Hawker Horizon, is a twin-engine super-midsize business jet developed and produced by Hawker Beechcraft (formerly Raytheon Aircraft Company).

== Development ==
The origins of the Hawker 4000 can be traced back to November 1996 and an announcement by Raytheon of a new business jet that would be larger than the existing Hawker 1000 that then formed the top of the company's jet range. The design, which was initially referred to as the Hawker Horizon, was intended to fly in 1999 and that type certification and initial customer deliveries were forecast to take place in 2001.

The first prototype made its maiden flight on August 11, 2001, with the second prototype and third prototypes making their maiden flights on May 10 and July 31, 2002. It made its public debut in November 2002 when a development aircraft was displayed at the National Business Aviation Association (NBAA) convention. As of March 2007 orders totaled more than 130 aircraft, with deliveries scheduled to begin in June 2008. On December 2, 2005 NetJets signed an order for 50 of the new aircraft, the largest single commercial order in the history of Raytheon Aircraft.

The Hawker 4000 was certified to FAA FAR Part 25 standards, which places a five-year time limit on certification of a new transport category aircraft. The 4000 completed Function and Reliability Tests on May 25, 2006. During September 2005, a prototype underwent testing at the McKinley Climatic Laboratory at Eglin Air Force Base, Florida. However, since the Part 25 five-year window expired May 31, 2006, the company filed an extension request to head off the possibility that the certification program would need to restart from the beginning. On November 21, 2006, the company announced that the 4000 had received type certification for the Federal Aviation Administration (FAA). That same year, Raytheon conducted work on increasing the cabin payload capacity to 870kg.

In May 2008, BJETS completed an order for ten Hawker 4000s with a contract value (including all options exercised) was reported to be in excess of $330 million. and Following the BJETS order, Hawker Beechcraft delivered its Hawker 4000 to a private customer, Jack P. DeBoer, during a special ceremony at the company's Customer Delivery Center in Wichita, Kan. At the time, the Hawker 4000 was stated to be the first aircraft in its class to use carbon composite construction.

In December 2009, the Hawker 4000 received type certification from the Civil Aviation Administration of China. In February 2010, Hawker Beechcraft delivered its first Hawker 4000 to a customer in mainland China.

By May 2013, Hawker-Beechcraft was reportedly offering its jet division, including the Hawker 4000 programme, to potential buyerse. The company intends to focus on propeller-driven aircraft; leaving the future of the Hawker 4000 up to an eventual buyer.

By 2018, 2008-2010 Hawker 4000s were priced around $4 million, at the engines’ scrap value.

== Design ==
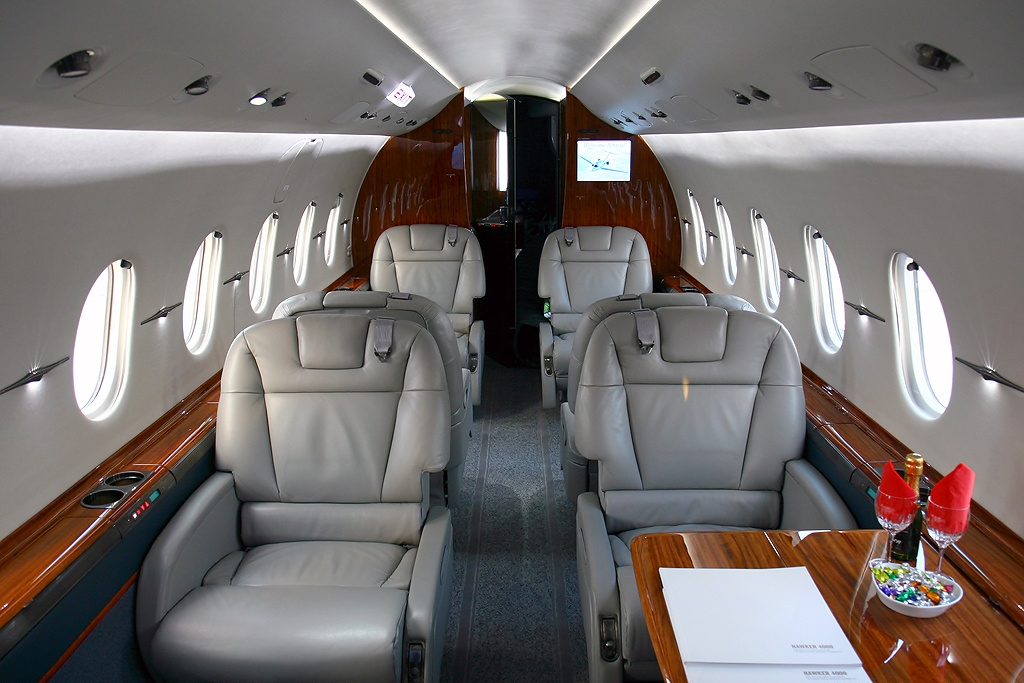
Cabin of a Hawker 4000

The Hawker 4000 is a twin-engine super-midsize business jet. The airframe's construction incorporates carbon composites, which have been attributed with making the aircraft lighter than a standard aluminum structure would permit and is a key element that permits the aircraft to achieve its a maximum range of 3,445 nautical miles along with a service ceiling of 45,000 feet (14,000 m). While the fuselage is largely composed of these composite materials, the wing is primarily made out of metal.

Dependent upon configuration, the cabin can seat up to ten passengers, and provide an average standing room of six feet. In an eight-seat cabin configuration, fully-articulated executive seating could be fitted. Towards the rear of the cabin is a sizable baggage compartment, which is could be accessed by ground personnel via an exterior door or through the cabin mid-flight.

The flight deck features a Honeywell Primus Epic avionics suite with EICAS, FADEC and autothrottle. It was powered by a pair of Pratt & Whitney Canada PW308A turbofan engines, which are capable of producing up to 6,900 lb of thrust.

Hawker 4000 in 2026

== Specifications ==
Data from Flight International

General characteristics

- Crew: 2 pilots
- Capacity: 8 passengers typical, 14 maximum and 15,225 lb (6,906 kg) useful load
- Length: 69 ft 2 in (21.08 m)
- Wingspan: 61 ft 9 in (18.82 m)
- Height: 19 ft 7 in (5.97 m)
- Empty weight: 22,275 lb (10,104 kg)
- Max takeoff weight: 39,500 lb (17,917 kg)
- Cabin length: 25 ft / 7.62 m
- Cabin width: 6 ft 6 in / 1.97 m
- Cabin Height: 6 ft / 1.83 m
- Max Landing Weight: 33,500 lb / 15,195 kg
- Payload with full fuel: 2625 lb / 1190 kg
- Fuel capacity: 14600 lb / 6623 kg
- Powerplant: 2 × Pratt & Whitney Canada PW308A turbofan, 6,900 lbf (31 kN) thrust each

Performance

- Cruise speed: 470 kn (540 mph, 870 km/h)
- Range: 3,341 nmi (3,845 mi, 6,188 km)
- Service ceiling: 45,000 ft (13,716 m)
- Take off distance: 4,509 ft / 1,374 m
- Landing distance: 2,916 ft / 889 m

== See also ==
Aircraft of comparable role, configuration, and era

- Bombardier Challenger 300
- Cessna Citation X
- Dassault Falcon 2000
- Embraer Legacy 600
- Gulfstream G280

Related lists

- List of civil aircraft
