= Chicago Teacher Education Pipeline =

The Chicago Teacher Education Pipeline is a partnership by Illinois State University and the Chicago Public School District to prepare qualified teachers for high-need schools. The partners' mission is to increase urban teacher recruitment and improve urban teacher retention through immersive programming. The Chicago Teacher Education Pipeline program began in 2003 through a United States Department of Education, No Child Left Behind federal earmark grant of $198,000. Its office is located in Chicago, Illinois in the East Garfield Park neighborhood.

The Chicago Teacher Education Pipeline also partners with Enlace-Chicago in Little Village, the Greater Auburn Gresham Community Development Corporation in Auburn Gresham, and the North River Commission in Albany Park. It is developing a new model for educational renewal through the construction of a community-based residential facility for teacher candidates. The project seeks to address the issue of a shortage of teachers in Chicago's public schools by focusing on recruitment, urban teacher preparation, community-based clinical experiences, faculty development and research.

== Program focus ==
The focus of the program is to develop sustainable responses to challenges faced by urban school districts in hiring effective teachers. The Chicago Teacher Pipeline works with its partners to address urban teacher shortages by:

- preparing teachers to live and work in urban settings
- recruiting students from urban schools for teacher preparation and then returning them home to teach
- providing community-based clinical experiences
- assisting with faculty development and research

== Teacher recruitment ==
First-year teachers tend to choose to teach in school districts near to where they grew up. By preparing student teachers to live and work in urban settings, and by recruiting students from urban schools for teacher preparation, the Chicago Teacher Education Pipeline works to provide Chicago Public Schools with a continuous supply of well-trained multicultural teachers. The project also offers a variety of professional development, research, and services to community members and students.

== Community-based facility ==
The Chicago Teacher Education Pipeline project is currently working to establish a community-based facility that provides:

- affordable housing for interns/student teachers
- overnight lodging for Illinois State University professors
- classroom space for seminars and other instruction
- computer/Internet instructional laboratory and space for groups with related missions to provide other services.

== Partnership initiatives ==
The Professional Articulation for Recruiting/Retaining Teachers for Neighborhood Engagement and Renewal (PARTNER) Project will increase the number of individuals from the Little Village community who enter teacher education programs and return to Chicago to teach. The PARTNER Project is supported by a grant from the United States Department of Education.

The Initiative for Education Renewal, made possible by State Farm Insurance Company Foundation Grant NEIGHBORS Project, leverages placement of teacher candidates (resident interns) in yearlong Professional Development Schools, thereby integrating their university learning with on-the-job learning.

== Grants and awards ==
In 2008, the Chicago Teacher Education Pipeline Programs and Partnership received the following awards:

- A Grow Your Own planning grant through the Illinois State Board of Education
- The American Association of Colleges for Teacher Education American Association of Colleges for Teacher Education (AACTE) Best Practice Award in Support of Global Diversity and Inclusion
- The Nicholas Michelli Award for Promoting Social Justice from the National Network for Educational Renewal (NNER).
