= Harvey Golub =

American businessman (born 1939)

- Born: April 16, 1939 (age 87); New York City, NY
- Education: Cornell University; New York University(BS)
- Occupation: Businessman
- Spouse: Roberta Golub
- Children: 4

Harvey Golub (born April 16, 1939) is an American businessman.

== Biography ==
Born to a Jewish family, Golub attended Cornell University and received a Bachelor of Science from the New York University.

He worked as a senior partner with McKinsey & Company. In 1983, American Express hired him to investigate a possible acquisition – Investors Diversified Services. After acquiring IDS, American Express hired Golub to run the company, which became American Express' second most profitable sector. In 1990 he was made vice chairman of American Express while remaining president and chief executive officer of IDS. In 1991, he was named president of American Express. From 1993 to 2001, he was chief executive officer of American Express. He served as chairman of the board at Campbell's from November 2004 to July 2009. He served as chairman of the American International Group (AIG). His resignation as AIG chairman was announced on July 16, 2010. He sits on the boards of directors of Marblegate Asset Management, the Campbell's, and Ripplewood Holdings.

In 2016, Golub was appointed to chair boutique energy company.

In 2011, he served as the chairman of Miller Buckfire and as Director at Hess Corporation.

He sat in 2015 on the board of trustees of the American Enterprise Institute, the Manhattan Institute for Policy Research, and the Lincoln Center for the Performing Arts.

In addition, in 2020 he served on Jupiter Medical Center‘s board of trustees and is chairman of the Maltz Jupiter Theatre endowment board. He is a director emeritus of New York-Presbyterian Hospital and the Lincoln Center for the Performing Arts and a member of its investment committee.

Golub was named the interim non-executive chairman of the board of Dynasty financial partners in April 2020.

== Personal life ==
Harvey Golub is married to Roberta Golub. Golub is the father of three adult children by a previous marriage.

Business positions
Preceded by Walter D. Scott	CEO of Investors Diversified Services; 1984–1991	Succeeded by Jeffrey Stiefler
Preceded by Lou Gerstner	President of American Express; 1991–1993	Succeeded by Jeffrey Stiefler
Preceded by James D. Robinson III	CEO of American Express; 1993–2001	Succeeded by Ken Chenault
Preceded by Edward M. Liddy	Non-executive chairman of AIG; 2009–2010	Succeeded by Steve Miller
