= Chicago Manufacturing Renaissance Council =

The Chicago Manufacturing Renaissance Council (CMRC) is a partnership of business, labor, government, education, and community leaders with a goal of reforming public education. The council plans to achieve this by replicating its Manufacturing Connect program at elementary and high schools in the Chicago region. This program links public schools with the manufacturing sector solving their talent needs and creating career options for youth and adults. Manufacturing Renaissance (www.mfgren.org) provides management and staff for the CMRC.
