= Communities In Schools of Chicago =

Non-profit organisation in the USA

Communities In Schools (CIS) of Chicago is a non-profit, 501(c)(3) organization that connects Chicago public school students with social, emotional, health and enrichment programs that remove barriers to learning. Founded in 1988, Communities In Schools of Chicago is partnering in 2019–20 with 175 Chicago Public Schools and 200+ service providers to facilitate program and service connections that address students' needs – all at no cost to students or schools. Many of these services are basic but essential, from health services to arts enrichment to violence prevention. Communities In Schools of Chicago is one of more than 130 local affiliates of the national Communities In Schools organization.

== Mission ==
The mission of CIS of Chicago is to surround students with a community of support, empowering them to stay in school and achieve in life.

== Vision ==
The vision of CIS of Chicago is to ensure that every public school student in Chicago graduates from high school prepared for success.

== History ==
CIS of Chicago was established in 1988 to help children become more successful in school and in life by connecting community-based organizations, hospitals, universities and other community partners to schools. CIS of Chicago has substantially increased the number of students served annually during the past 20 years, growing from roughly 12,000 young people reached annually in the mid-1990s to more than 70,000 during the 2018–2019 school year. During the 2009–2010 academic year, CIS of Chicago piloted its first Intensive Program school site. Through the program, CIS of Chicago, like its sibling affiliates across the U.S., places a staff member on the ground 4 days a week to do two key things: (1) provide ongoing intervention services to students at relatively high risk of dropping out and (2) help coordinate support services via community partners for all students. In 2019–20, CIS of Chicago will either link or directly provide support services to 75,000 students in Chicago Public Schools. This includes an estimated 1,400 students in 31 Intensive Program schools that will receive direct support from embedded CIS of Chicago staff.

== 2-Program Model ==
CIS of Chicago positively impacts the lives of public school students at 175 CPS schools through two core programs:

•Through the Partnership Program, the majority of students at 144 CPS schools will be linked to community partner programming
•Through the Intensive Program, the majority of students at 31 CPS schools will be linked to community partner programming this year. In addition, embedded CIS staff at these schools will provide ongoing intervention services like supportive guidance, goal setting, and counseling to targeted students who need extra support to succeed in school and stay on the path to graduation.

In addition to the Partnership Program and Intensive Program, CIS of Chicago operates a unique program called STEMpathy. Through the program, which takes place both during and after school, students hone their science, math, and technology skills through an engaging robotics curriculum while also developing essential interpersonal and teamwork skills. The program is inspired by a series of columns by New York Times writer Thomas Friedman, who argued that the jobs of the future will require worker with both solid STEM abilities and strong social-emotional learning skills.

== The Need ==
According to latest CPS data, 77 percent of Chicago public school students come from low-income families. Many lack access to basic support systems and are hindered academically by the challenges they face outside of the classroom. Parents often look to schools for access to social, emotional, health and enrichment services and programs, but many schools are under-resourced and stretched just to address core academics. Many local organizations, corporations, and institutions are ready to help but do not always know how to access or navigate schools or how to adapt their programming for classroom settings.

== The Impact ==
In 2019–20, CIS of Chicago will link more 75,000 students at 175 CPS schools with essential support programs through its Partnership Program. A randomized control trial design study conducted between 2013 and 2015 found that the linkage of such services resulted in a statistically and educationally significant increase in the number of elementary-school-age students performing proficiently in mathematics and reading compared to students who attended non-CIS of Chicago partner schools (footnote 1). Further, an extensive review of integrated student support programs across the nation cited CIS of Chicago's Partnership Program as a promising intervention (footnote 2). Moreover, school principals and staff consistently report improvements in students' knowledge about health issues, self-esteem, emotional health, and increased access to the arts. Service providers report that they have increased the number of students and schools reached since working with Communities In Schools of Chicago.

During the 2019–20 academic year, CIS of Chicago will place master's level Student Supports Managers in 31 of its 175 partner sites. Last year our Supports Managers provided a range of intervention services to almost 1,000 targeted students who were off track in their attendance, behavior and/or grades. Of that cohort:

•99 percent either graduated or were promoted to the next grade

•None dropped out

== The Model ==
=== How CIS of Chicago Supports Schools ===
• No-cost connections to a network of 200+ service providers based in the Chicago area
• Exclusive training and networking events
• In 31 of the 175 partner schools, exists a CIS of Chicago Student Supports Manager to provide ongoing interventions services to students off track in their attendance, behavior and/or grades.

=== How CIS of Chicago Supports Service Providers ===
• Assistance accessing and navigating more 175 schools
• Techniques and tools to increase student impact
• Individualized instruction on topics like program coordination, communication and evaluation of programs
• Exclusive training and networking events
• Strategic support in expanding reach and customizing programs to school needs

=== Types of Programs Connected Via Community Partners ===
Through the work of Communities In Schools of Chicago's extensive community partner network, students receive support programming in:
• The arts
• Behavioral and mental health
• College and career readiness
• Health and wellness
