= British Aerospace 125 =

Business jet

BAe 125/Dominie Hawker 1000
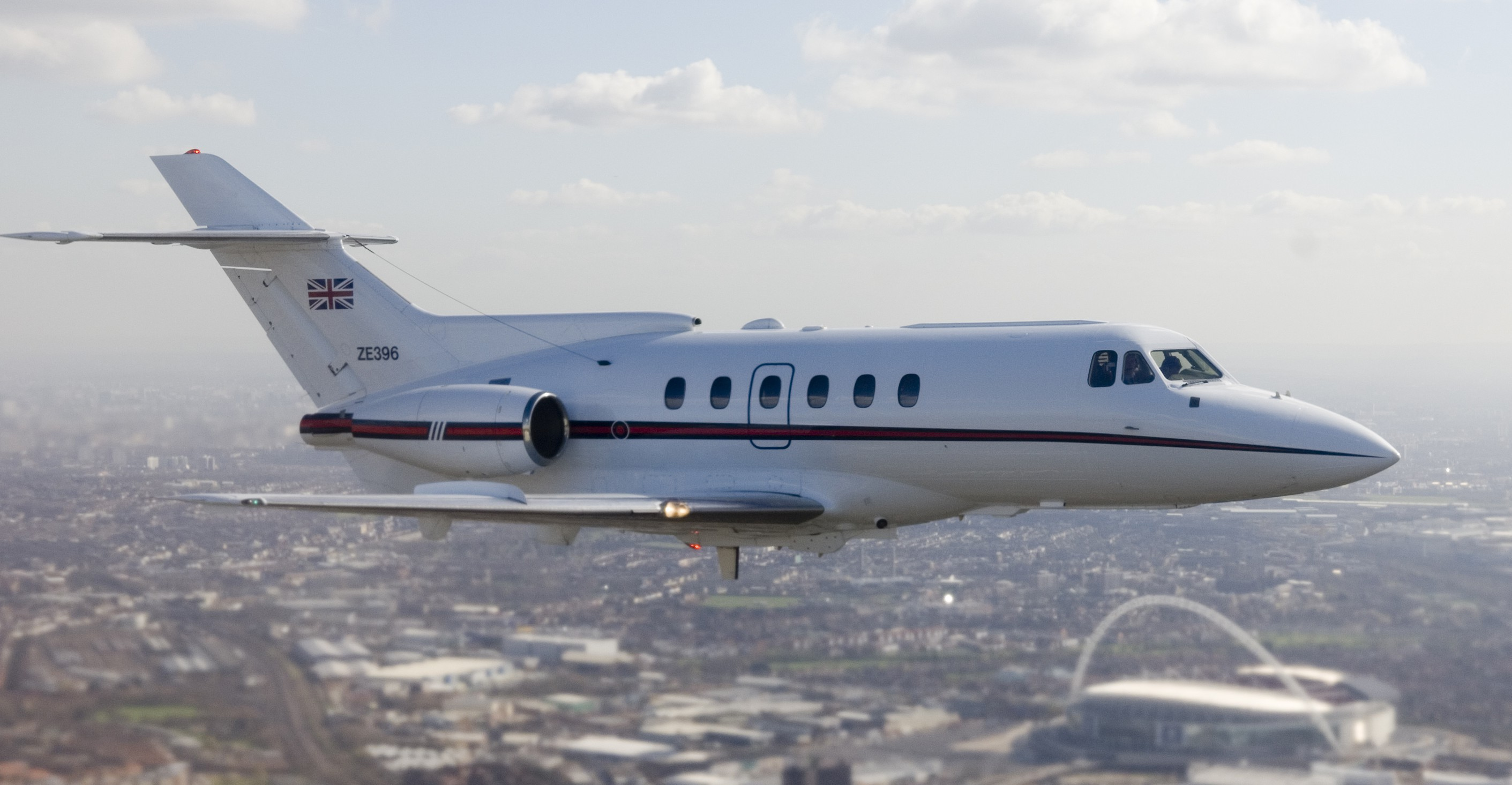

General information
- Type: Mid-size business jet
- Manufacturer: de Havilland (design); Hawker Siddeley (to 1977); British Aerospace (1977–1993); Raytheon (1993–2007); Hawker Beechcraft (2007–2013)
- Status: Active service
- Primary users: Japan Air Self-Defense Force Brazilian Air Force
- Number built: 1,720

History
- Manufactured: 1963–2013
- First flight: 13 August 1962
- Variant: Hawker 800

The British Aerospace 125 is a twinjet mid-size business jet. Originally developed by de Havilland and initially designated as the DH.125 Jet Dragon, it entered production as the Hawker Siddeley HS.125, which was the designation used until 1977 when Hawker Siddeley was merged into British Aerospace. Later variants of the type were marketed as the Hawker 800 and Hawker 1000.

More than 60% of the total sales of the aircraft were to North American customers. It was also used by the Royal Air Force as a navigation trainer, as the Hawker Siddeley Dominie T1, and was operated by the United States Air Force as a calibration aircraft, under the designation C-29.

== Development ==
=== Origins ===
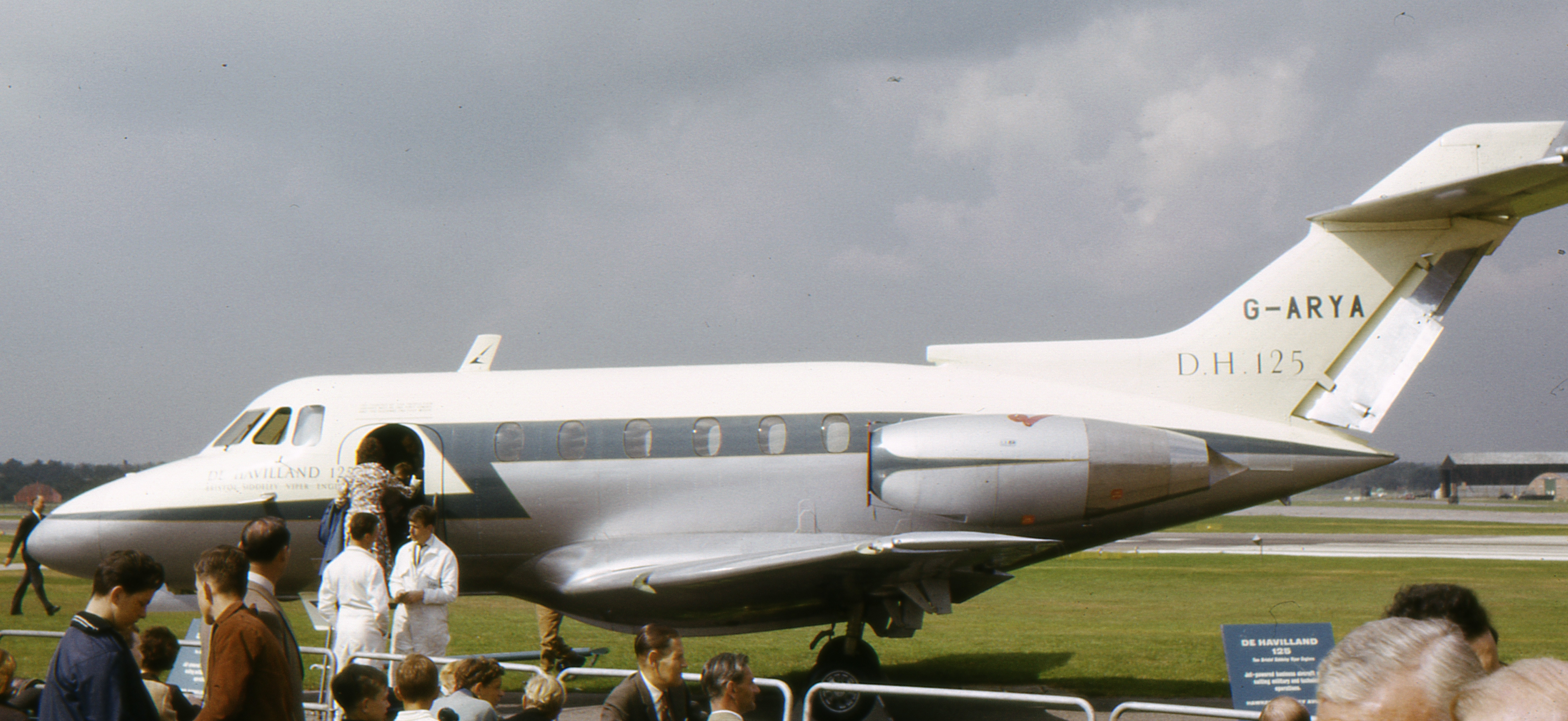
One of the prototypes on display at the 1962 Farnborough Air Show

In 1961, de Havilland began work upon a small business jet, then known as the DH.125 Jet Dragon, which was intended to replace the piston engined de Havilland Dove, a successful business aircraft and light transport. Prior to the start of the project, de Havilland had determined that a successful business jet would require several goals to be met, including a range of at least 1,000 miles (1,600 km), the speed and cost factors of a suitable jet engine to outperform turboprop-propelled competitors, and an engineering philosophy that favoured reliability and conventionality. The design team settled on a twin-engine aircraft with the engines mounted on the rear fuselage. The Bristol Siddeley Viper turbojet powerplant was selected for the type.

On 13 August 1962, the first of two prototypes conducted its first flight; a second aircraft followed it on 12 December that year. The second prototype was more aerodynamically representative of a production aircraft, and was fitted out with more equipment than the first; the subsequent production-standard aircraft incorporated several changes and improvements from the prototypes, such as a longer fuselage and a greater wingspan. The first production-standard aircraft performed its first flight on 12 February 1963. The first delivery to a customer took place on 10 September 1964.

=== Production ===
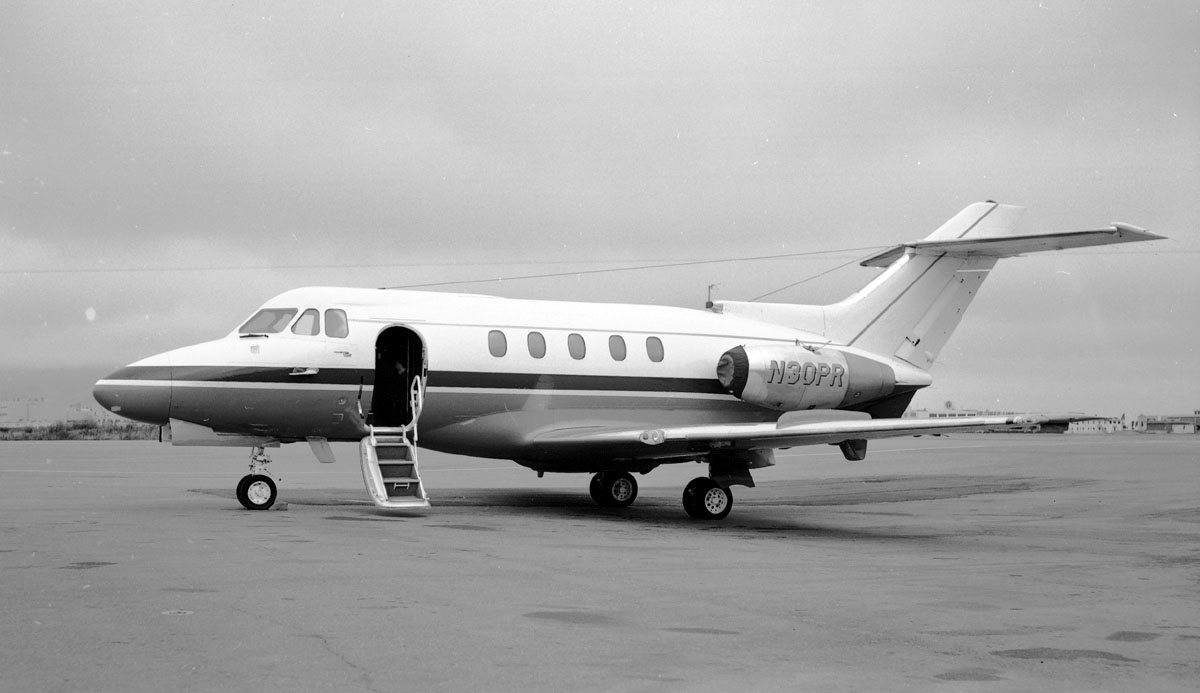
Hawker Siddeley DH.125 Series 400A in San Francisco, United States, 1971

The aircraft went through many designation changes during its service life. Hawker Siddeley had bought de Havilland the year before the project had started, but the legacy brand and "DH" designation was used throughout development. After the jet achieved full production, the name was changed to HS.125 except for American exports which retained the DH.125 until it was replaced by BH.125 for Beechcraft-Hawker. When Hawker Siddeley Aircraft merged with the British Aircraft Corporation to form British Aerospace in 1977, the name changed to BAe 125. When British Aerospace sold its business jets division to Raytheon in 1993, the then-main variant of the jet became widely referred to as the Hawker 1000.

While the two prototypes were assembled at de Havilland's Hatfield site, final assembly of all production aircraft would take place at the Broughton factory near Chester until the 1990s. By the 2000s, the fuselage, wings and tailfin of the aircraft were still being assembled and partially equipped at the Broughton site, now being owned and managed by Airbus UK; various sub-assemblies were also produced in Airbus UK's Buckley facility, nearby in Flintshire. From 1996 onwards, the assembled sections and components were shipped to Wichita, Kansas in the United States, to undergo final assembly. Writing in 1993, Flying Magazine said of the type "In numerical terms, the 125 series is the most successful British commercial aircraft ever built, and the world's longest in-production business jet".

Production of the aircraft came to an abrupt halt in 2013 due to the bankruptcy of owner Hawker Beechcraft, following the Great Recession of the late 2000s in which demand for business jets had slumped for a number of years. The type had been in production for more than 50 years when manufacturing stopped, during which time over 1,600 aircraft had been produced. In April 2013, the type certificate and support responsibility for all 125s built was transferred to the reformed Beechcraft Corporation. As of October 2012, Beechcraft did not intend to restart production of its business jet lines; instead the company intended to alternatively sell or dismantle the production facilities for the 125 family.

== Design ==
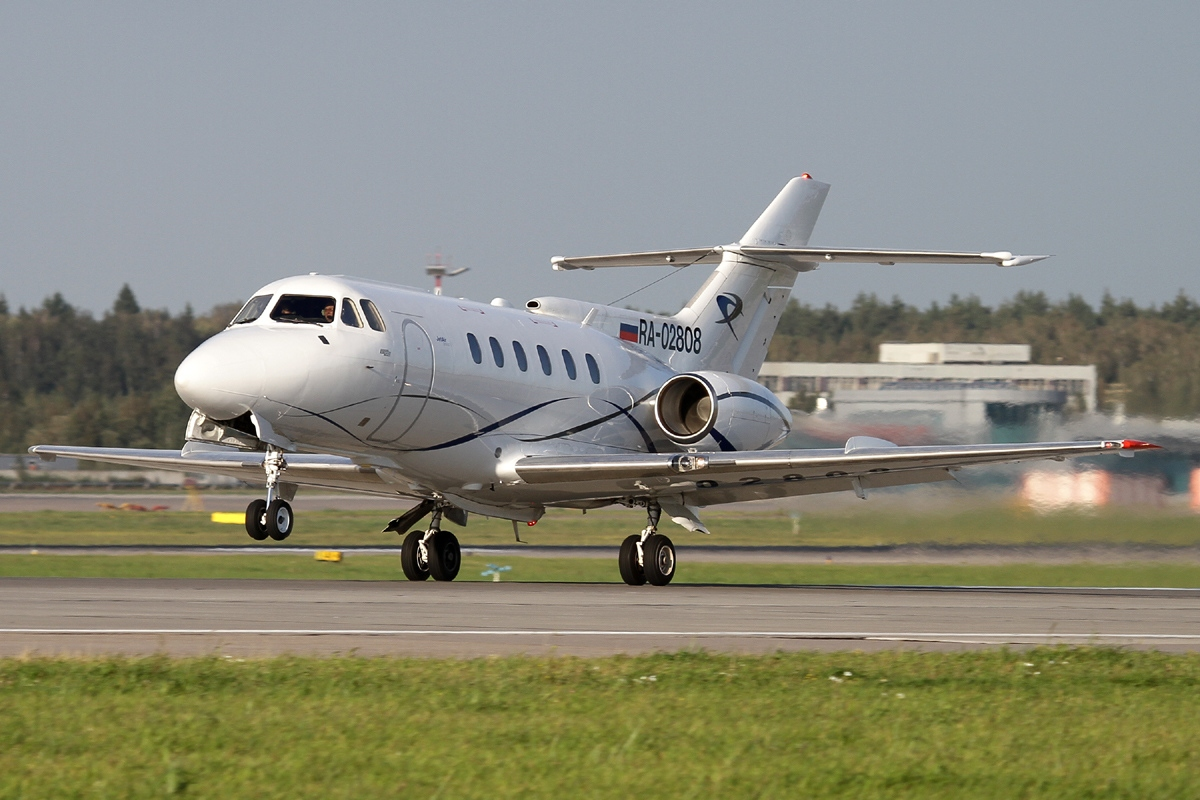
HS.125-700B taking off in Moscow, Russia, 2012

The BAe 125 is a low-winged monoplane, powered by two engines mounted on the rear fuselage. It features a slightly swept wing, which is based on the larger de Havilland Comet wing planform, and uses large slotted flaps and airbrakes for operating from small airfields; the aircraft can be flown from hardened grass airstrips. The aircraft has a cylindrical fuselage with a one-piece wing mounted on the underside of the fuselage; most of the manufacturing and assembly work on the wing and fuselage is able to be done with them as separate items with the two being joined late in the production process. The wing has integral fuel tanks which contain most of the fuel.

Early models of the aircraft were powered by several versions of the Bristol Siddeley Viper turbojet engine, while later aircraft adopted more recent turbofan powerplants such as the Garrett TFE731 and Pratt & Whitney Canada PW300. Both engines drive an electrical generator and hydraulic pump which supply power to the aircraft systems so in the event of a single engine failure, all aircraft systems continue to operate normally.

All control surfaces of the aircraft are aerodynamically balanced using set-back hinges and geared tabs. The flaps and airbrakes are operated hydraulically, while the ailerons, elevators, and rudder are manually operated. The design of the control circuits allows for a Collins-built A.P.103 autopilot to be incorporated. The aircraft is equipped with a de-icing system, which uses a mixture of bleed air from the engines, TKS fluid for general airframe, and AC electric windshield heating to prevent ice formation. Weather radar was incorporated into the aircraft's avionics. The Royal Air Force equipped some of their aircraft with equipment to defend against attack by infra-red missiles.

The pressurised fuselage was designed to accommodate two pilots and six passengers. Various interiors were offered, with a high degree of passenger comfort. In an executive configuration, the flight deck is separated from the main passenger cabin; the single entrance of the aircraft, directly behind the cockpit and forward of the passenger cabin, forms a vestibule area in which luggage can be stored and meals prepared during flight. An unobstructed cabin floor with 5 feet 9 inches (1.75 m) of headroom and a 3 feet (0.91 m) wide cabin door also allowed the loading of bulky equipment, which was seen as particularly attractive to military operators. However, the internal "up and over" door was replaced on the Series 400 and thereafter by a more usual outward opening door with built-in steps. An emergency overwing exit hatch is located in the passenger cabin midsection over the starboard wing (although some versions have both port and starboard exits). The rear of the fuselage has a large equipment bay and, on some aircraft, one or two additional fuel tanks for extended operations.

== Operational history ==
Having entered service as one of the first-generation executive jets, the British Aerospace 125 has been operated by a wide variety of customers, ranging from government and military operators to private customers and businesses; it has also seen use by several airlines. Many of the aircraft's customers have been located in North America; in 1990, out of the 650 aircraft then being operated, more than 400 were being flown in the United States. Reportedly, one aircraft was being sold every seven working days for a substantial period of the type's production life. Successively larger versions were introduced to extend the type's appeal and to better compete against larger jets being used for business travel, such as the Gulfstream IV and Falcon 900.

The Royal Air Force was a significant early operator of the type, receiving 20 aircraft equipped as a navigation trainer and designated Hawker Siddeley Dominie T.1. The type entered service in 1965, with the surviving aircraft upgraded in 1996 to be more suitable for training crews for modern aircraft, with a new radar fitted. The Dominie served in excess of 45 years before being retired in 2011 due to diminishing requirements. Additional 125s were acquired and operated by No. 32 Squadron RAF as communications and light transport aircraft; these were also occasionally operated to transport Queen Elizabeth II and other members of the British royal family. In the later stages of the War in Afghanistan, various 125s were used to transport military officers and other key personnel in and out of the country. The type was scheduled to be withdrawn from RAF service by 2022, but was withdrawn in 2015.

By the early 1990s, British Aerospace, the manufacturer of the type at this point, had two main variants of the aircraft in production: the 125-800 and the larger 125-1000. The 125-1000, which conducted its first flight on 16 June 1990, had several changes to give the type a reported intercontinental range, including the adoption of the newly developed Pratt & Whitney Canada PW300 engine and new digital avionics, such as FADEC. Following Raytheon's purchase of British Aerospace's business jet division during the 1990s, the two in-production variants were re-designated as the Hawker 800 and Hawker 1000 respectively.

The 125 is the only business jet to have been hijacked: in 1967, a chartered 125 carrying the former Congolese Prime Minister Moïse Tshombe was diverted to Algeria by armed persons on board. The 125 is also likely to be the only business aircraft to survive being hit by an air-to-air missile: in August 1988, a British Aerospace 125-800 transporting Botswana President Quett Masire was struck by a missile launched by a nearby Angolan Mig-23, apparently inadvertently. While badly damaged by the direct hit (which resulted in the loss of an engine, decompression of the cabin, and rupture of its fuel tanks) the aircraft was successfully landed by BAe demonstrator pilot Arthur Ricketts. It was later rebuilt.

In 2013, the FAA modified its rules to prohibit the operation of jets weighing 75,000 pounds (34,000 kg) or less that are not stage 3 noise compliant, specifically mentioning the 125 series of aircraft. This required any aircraft of the type either to have compliant engines installed, or to be fitted with a hush kit, to fly over most of the United States after 31 December 2015.

== Variants ==
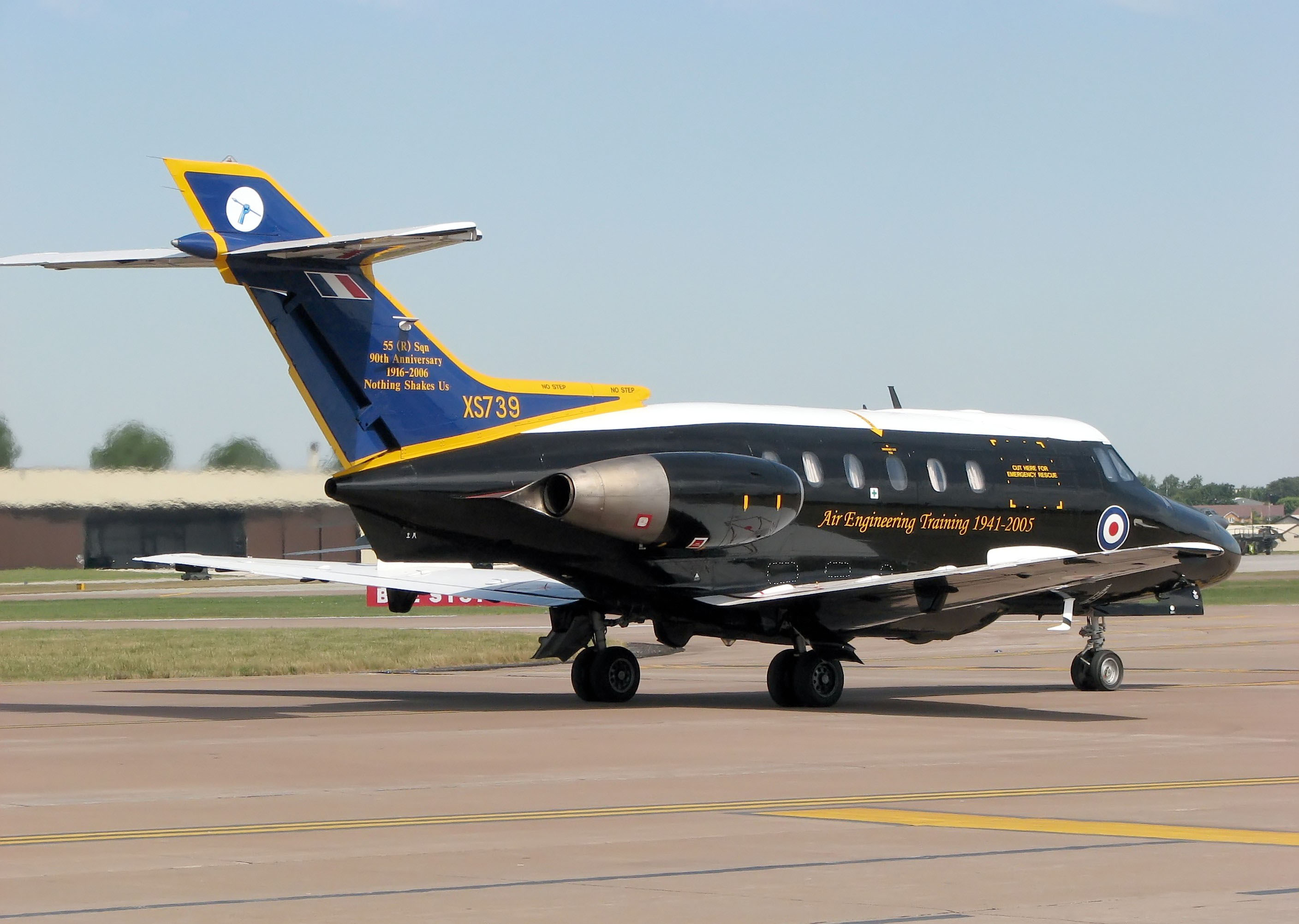
Hawker Siddeley Dominie at RAF Fairford, Gloucestershire, England, 2006

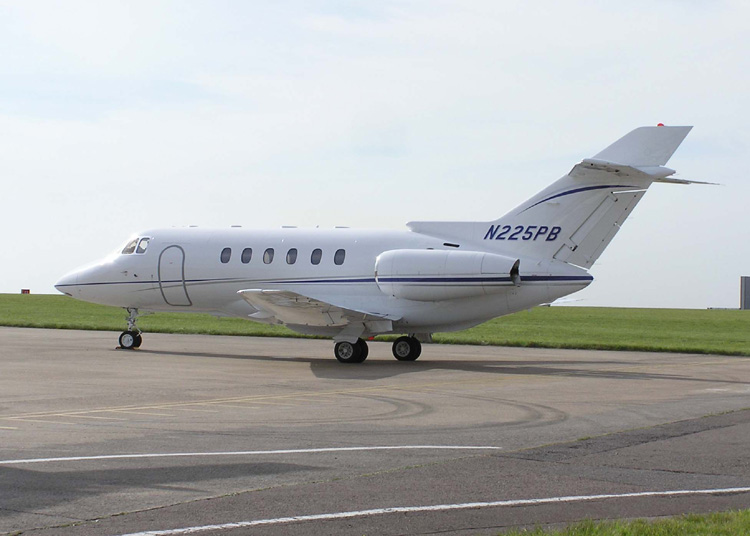
Raytheon Hawker 800 at Cardiff Airport, Glamorgan, Wales, 2004

Series 1
First version, powered by 3,000 lbf (13 kN) Viper 20 or 520 engines. Ten built, including two prototypes (43 ft 6 in (13.26 m) long, 44 ft (13.41 m) span) and eight production aircraft 47 ft 5 in (14.56 m) long, 47 ft (14.33 m) long.
Series 1A/1B – upgraded Bristol Siddeley Viper 521 engines with 3,100 lbf (14 kN) of thrust each, and five cabin windows instead of six (as the window nearest the engines allowed too much cabin noise). Series 1A for US FAA certification (62 built), Series 1B for sale elsewhere (13 built).
Series 1A-522 and 1B-522 – Series 1A/B aircraft with Viper 522 engines.
Series 1A-R522 and 1B-R522 – Series 1A-522 and 1B-522 aircraft with long-range fuel tanks, modified flaps and main landing gear doors.
Series 1A-S522 and 1B-S522 – Some aircraft were structural modified to Series 3 standard but without a change in maximum landing weight or maximum operating altitude.

Series 2
Navigation trainer for Royal Air Force (20 built), with service designation Dominie T.1 – (Rolls-Royce Viper 301). The Dominie retained six windows on the port side, and only the rearmost four on the starboard side.

Series 3
Series 3A/B – Viper 522-powered variant with increased weights.
Series 3A/R and 3B/R – early aircraft modified to the series 3 standard but without a change in maximum landing weight or maximum operating altitude and increased fuel capacity with additional 135 US gal in a ventral tank.
Series 3A/RA and 3B/RA – Series 1A/B aircraft modified to Series 3 standard with structural changes for increased maximum zero fuel weight, maximum rampweight and additional 135 US gal ventral fuel tank.
Series 3B/RB – variant of the 3B/RA with increased maximum ramp weight and maximum takeoff weight.
Series 3B/RC – variant of the 3B/RA modified as a navigation aid checker with four-seat cabin configuration and addition of avionic and flight inspection equipment.
F3B – re-engined with Honeywell TFE731 engines.
F3B/RA – re-engined with Honeywell TFE731 engines.
EC-93 – Brazilian Air Force designation for an electronic warfare variant of the Series 3B/RA.
VC-93 – Brazilian Air Force designation for a VIP transport variant of the Series 3B/RA.

Series 400
Series 400A and 400B – increased maximum ramp and brake-release weights and addition of a outward-opening main entry door with integral steps. From 1970 the Series 400A aircraft for the United States were marketed as the Beechcraft Hawker BH.125 Series 400A.
Series 401B – Increased maximum take off and zero fuel weights and alteration to cabin loading.
Series 403A(C) – The same as a 403B but for use in Canada.
Series 403B – Increased maximum take off, zero fuel and ramp weights, alteration to cabin loading.
HS.125 CC1 – British military designation for a series 400 communications aircraft for the Royal Air Force
Series F400A and F400B re-engined with Honeywell TFE731 engines.
EU-93 – Brazilian Air Force designation for an electronic warfare variant of the Series 403B.
VU-93 – Brazilian Air Force designation for a VIP transport variant of the Series 403B.
XU-93 – Brazilian Air Force designation for an experimental variant.

Series 600
Series 600A and 600B – Change to Viper 601-22 engines, increased weights and operating speeds, 3 ft 1 in (0.94 m) fuselage stretch to increase capacity to 10 passengers (with an additional forward window), increased fuel capacity including an additional tank in the dorsal fairing, revised aileron tab arrangements and aileron control gearing and improved aerodynamics. The stretched fuselage and increased slope of windshield allowed the removal of the distinctive fairing above the cockpit. From 1973 the Series 600A aircraft were marketed as the Beechcraft Hawker BH.125 Series 600A.
Series 600B/1
Series 600B/2
Series 600B/3
Series F600A and F600B – re-engined with Honeywell TFE731 engines.
HS.125 CC2 – British military designation for series 600 communications aircraft for the Royal Air Force.

Series 700
Series 700A and 700B variants had the Honeywell TFE731-3RH turbofan engines with 3,720 lbf (16.5 kN) of thrust each, first flight 19 June 1976. All earlier models could also be re-engined.
BAe 125 CC3 – British military designation for Series 700 communications aircraft for the Royal Air Force.
HS.125 Protector – Series 700-based maritime patrol aircraft with a search radar and cameras.

Series 800
BAe 125 800 – increased wingspan, streamlined nose, tailfin extension, increased fuel capacity, first corporate jet to feature an EFIS cockpit, upgraded engines, first flight 26 May 1983.
Hawker 800 – Final variant of the BAe 125 800 series. Produced under the "Corporate Aircraft" moniker before being replaced by the Hawker 800XP.
Hawker 800XP – variant with TFE731-5BR1H turbofan engines with 4,660 lbf (20.7 kN) of thrust each
Hawker 800SP and 800XP2 – The designation for Hawker 800 and Hawker 800XP aircraft fitted with Aviation Partners Inc. (API) winglets.
Hawker 850XP – 800XP with factory installed winglets and interior updates.
Hawker 900XP – 850XP with Honeywell TFE731-50R turbofan engines for increased hot/high performance and longer range and modified avionics.
Hawker 750 – A derivative of the Hawker 800XP with a lightweight interior and heated baggage pannier replacing the rear ventral fuel tank.
C-29A – United States military designation for a derivative of the BAe 125 800 designed to replace the Lockheed C-140A, used by the Air Force to accomplish the combat flight inspection and navigation mission (C-FIN) at US airbases around the world, participated in Operation Desert Shield and Operation Desert Storm during the First Gulf War.
U-125 – BAe 125 800 based flight inspection aircraft for Japan (similar to C-29A)
U-125A – Hawker 800 based search and rescue aircraft for Japan, equipped with the APS-134LW radar system.

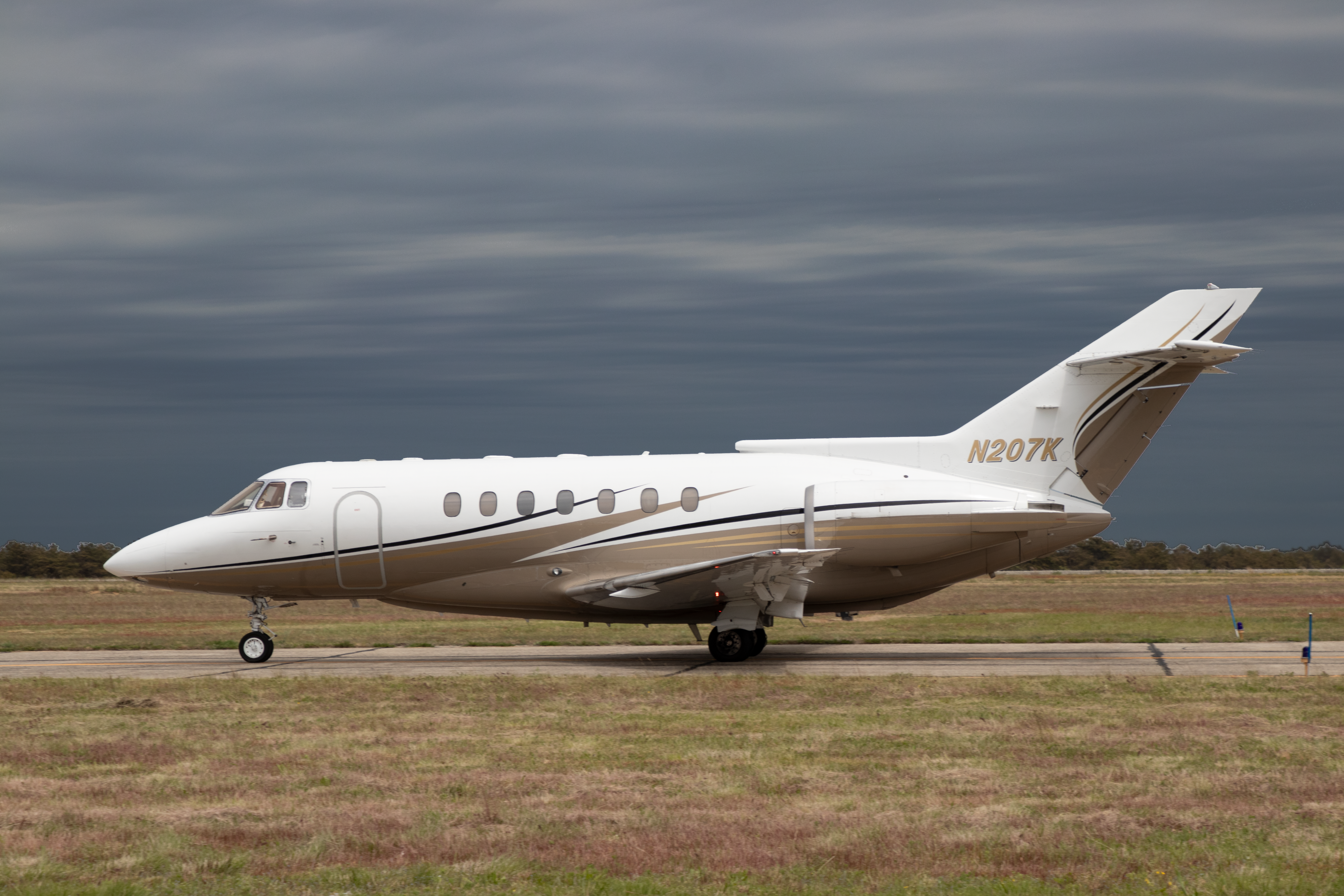
Raytheon Hawker 1000

Series 1000
British Aerospace BAe 125 Series 1000A and 1000B – intercontinental version of the Series 800, 2 ft 9 in (0.84 m) fuselage stretch to increase capacity to 15, increased fuel capacity, Pratt & Whitney Canada PW-305 turbofans with 5,200 lbf (23 kN) thrust each, first flight 16 June 1990, 52 built.
Hawker 1000 – BAe 125-1000 after 1994.

Handley Page HP.130
A 1963 proposal with boundary layer control wings (not built). It was to be powered by two Bristol Siddeley Viper 520s of 3,000 lbf (13 kN) thrust with a projected maximum speed of Mach 0.8. This conversion was to be for laminar flow research purposes.

== Operators ==
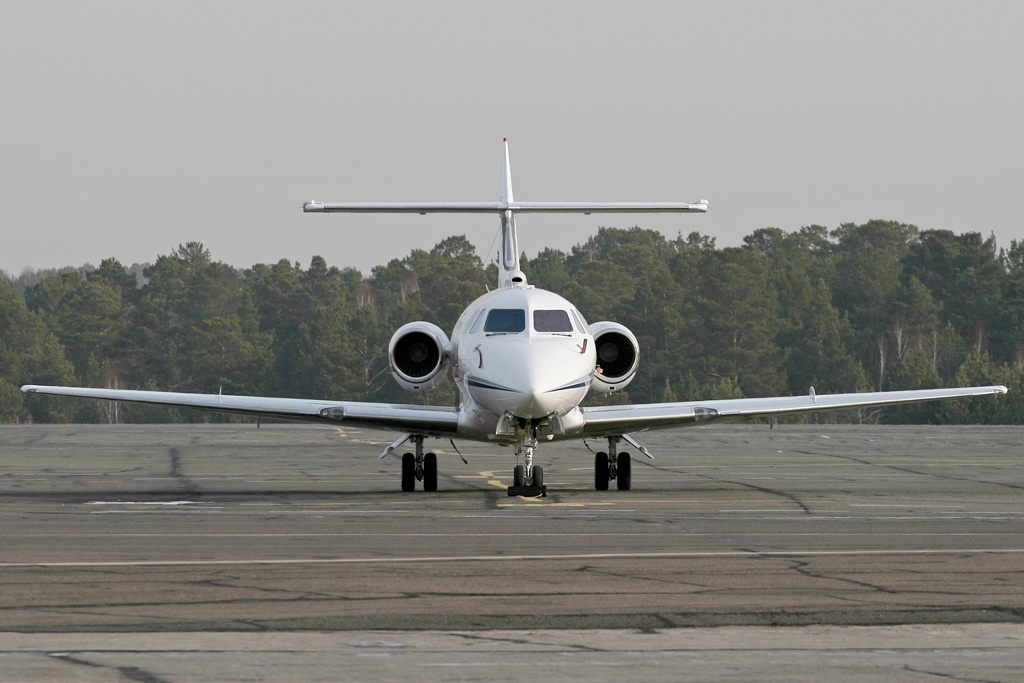
Aerolimousine HS.125-700A in Krasnoyarsk, Russia in 2008

=== Civil operators ===
Private operators, air taxi, shared ownership and corporate charter operators worldwide. Between 1965 and 1972 Qantas used two Series 3s for crew training.

=== Current military operators ===
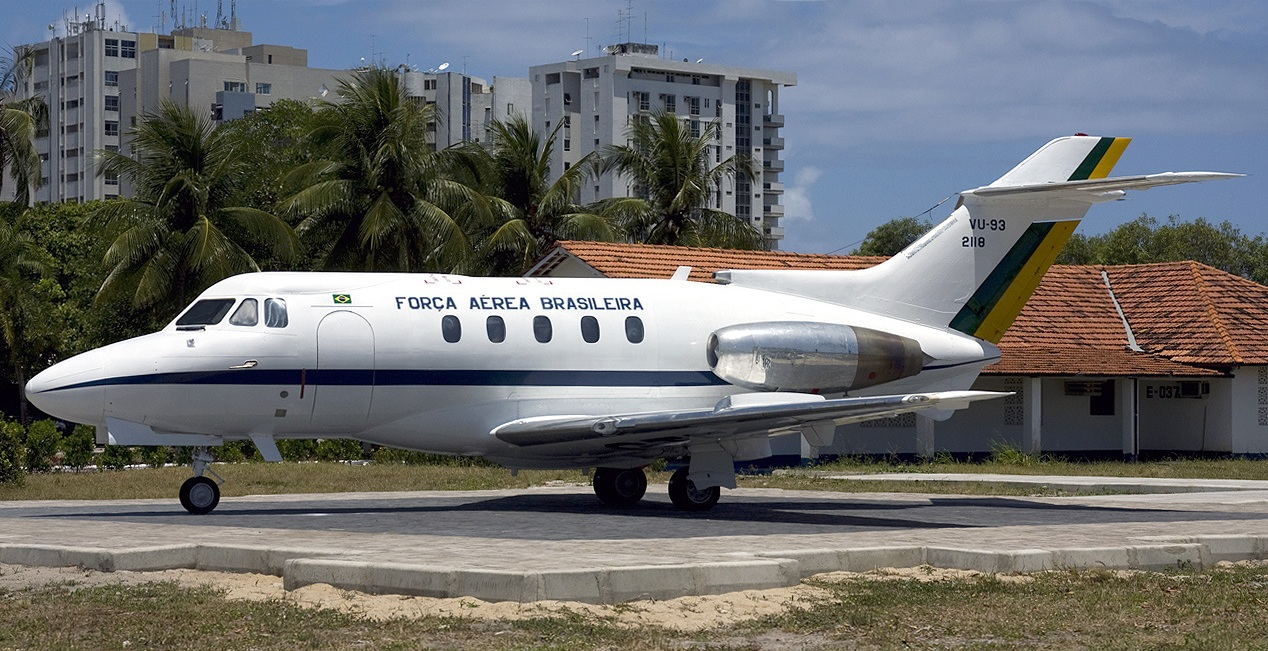
Brazilian Air Force HS.125-400A at Recife Airport, Brazil in 2008

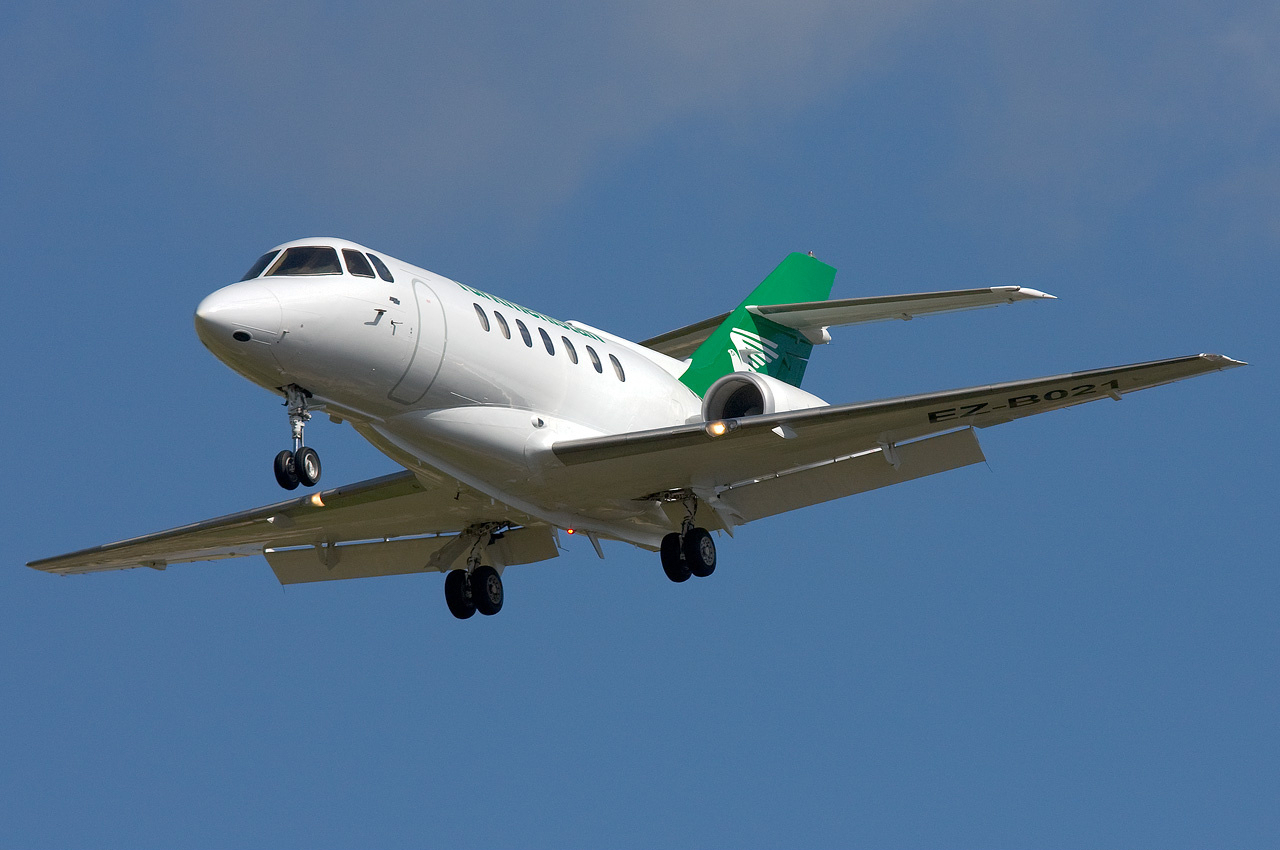
Turkmenistan Airlines BAe125-1000B during low flight in 2008

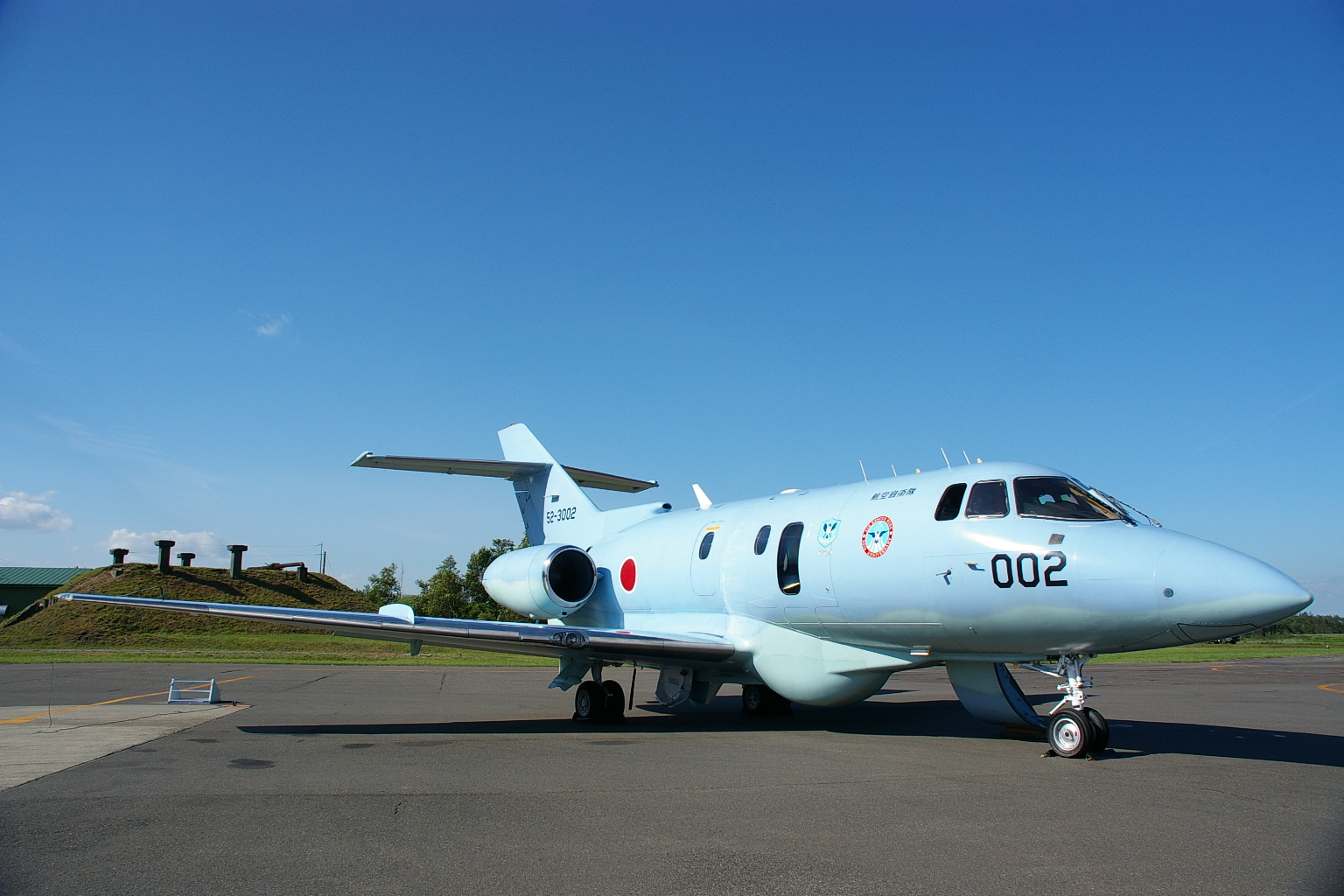
Japan Air Self-Defense Force U-125A

Botswana

- Botswana Defence Force Air Wing

Brazil

- Brazilian Air Force

Japan

- Japan Air Self-Defense Force – Flight Check Squadron (U-125), Air Rescue Wing (U-125A)

In December 2022, the Japanese government decided to replace 26 U-125A, 47 AH-1S, 12 AH-64D, and 33 OH-1 with unmanned aerial vehicles. Japan planned to increase its defense budget from 1.24% of GDP in fiscal 2021 to around 2.0% within 10 years, and decided to retire these helicopters and aircraft as part of an effort to spend its defense budget efficiently.
Nigeria

- Nigerian Air Force

Pakistan

- Pakistan Navy

Saudi Arabia

- Royal Saudi Air Force

South Korea

- Republic of Korea Air Force

Turkmenistan

- Turkmenistan Airlines on behalf of the government

=== Former military operators ===
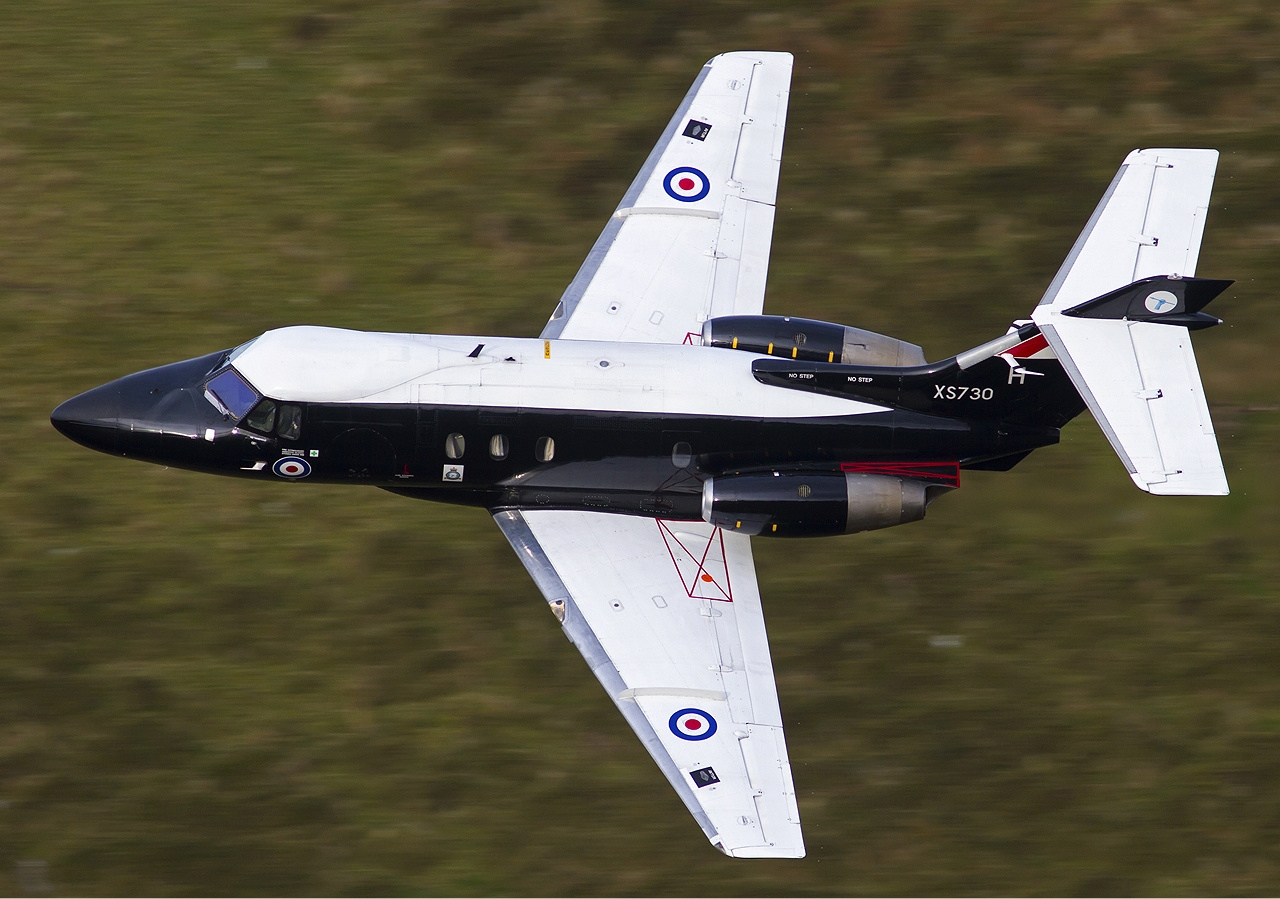
Royal Air Force Dominie T1 in 2010

Argentina

- Argentine Naval Aviation operated one HS.125-400 for navigation aid calibration.
- Argentine Air Force A single HS.125-700 was impressed into Escuadrón Fénix during the Falklands War.

Ireland

- Irish Air Corps

Malawi

- Malawi Army Air Wing

Malaysia

- Royal Malaysian Air Force

Nicaragua

- Nicaraguan Air Force

South Africa

- South African Air Force
  - No. 21 Squadron SAAF

United Kingdom

- Royal Air Force
  - No. 32 (The Royal) Squadron
  - No. 55(R) Squadron RAF (Dominie T1)
  - No. 6 Flying Training School RAF
  - Royal Air Force College Cranwell

Uruguay

- Uruguayan Air Force

== Accidents and incidents ==
- On 30 June 1967, Air Hanson HS.125 (G-ASNU) carrying former Congolese prime minister Moïse Tshombe was hijacked and taken to Algeria.
- On 28 December 1970, a Morrison Knudsen DH.125 (N36MK) made a controlled flight into terrain (CFIT) in Idaho, United States, about seven miles (11 km) northeast of the Boise Airport, at an elevation of approximately 5,700 feet (1,740 m) above sea level. The corporate jet was returning from Billings, Montana, where four passengers were dropped off. No passengers were on board at the time of the crash, more than an hour after sunset, which killed both pilots.
- On 26 May 1971, 11 people were killed when three Mercurius HS.125 aircraft belonging to the South African Air Force crashed into Devil's Peak, Cape Town, while practising for a flypast for the tenth anniversary of the republic.
- On 20 November 1975, a Hawker Siddeley HS125-600B registered G-BCUX and operated by Hawker Siddeley as a demonstrator, overran the runway at Dunsfold Aerodrome after a bird strike on takeoff. The aircraft hit a car that was travelling along the A281 at the time and stopped in a nearby field, killing six people in the car and injuring one crew member out of nine passengers and crew. The aircraft was being flown by the World War 2 fighter ace John Cunningham.
- On 8 September 1987, a Brazilian Air Force Hawker Siddeley HS.125 registration FAB-2129 crashed upon takeoff from Carajás. All nine occupants died.
- On 7 August 1988, a BAe-125 owned by the Botswana Government was carrying the President of Botswana, Quett Masire, and his staff to a meeting in Luanda. An Angolan MiG-23 pilot fired two R-60 (AA-8) missiles at the plane. One missile hit the no. 2 engine, causing it to fall off the aircraft. The second missile then hit the falling engine. The crew was able to make a successful emergency landing on a bush strip at Cutio Bie. There were no fatalities.
- On 16 March 1991, a Hawker Siddeley HS.125-1A charter aircraft (N831LC) carrying band members for Reba McEntire crashed into the side of Otay Mountain. The accident occurred shortly after takeoff from San Diego – Brown Field Municipal Airport. All eight band members aboard plus two pilots were killed in the crash believed to have been caused by poor visibility.
- On 31 July 2008, a British Aerospace 125 operating as East Coast Jets Flight 81 crashed nose-down into a cornfield after overrunning a runway at Owatonna Degner Regional Airport, after a business flight from Atlantic City International Airport. All 6 passengers and 2 crew members were immediately killed in the crash. The NTSB investigators believed the cause of the crash was pilot error after investigation.
- On 5 September 2015, an HS 125 of Senegalair was involved in a mid-air collision with a Ceiba Airlines Boeing 737 over Senegal. It is thought that the HS 125 suffered a decompression that incapacitated the flight crew. The aircraft crashed an hour later into the Atlantic Ocean west of Senegal with no survivors. The 737 made a safe landing.
- On 10 November 2015, a Hawker 700A operating as Execuflight Flight 1526 crashed on approach to Akron Fulton International Airport in Akron, Ohio, killing all 9 aboard. The National Transportation Safety Board reported the crash was caused by pilot error, an FAA inspection issue, and charter company operations issues.
- On 6 April 2016, a U-125 of the Japan Air Self-Defence Force's Flight Check Squadron crashed in Kagoshima Prefecture, Japan, after taking off from the Japan Maritime Self-Defense Force's Kanoya Air Field. It had been on a mission to check the base's air navigation aid system when it crashed into nearby Mount Takakuma with the loss of all six crew.
- In 2025 a crashed and abandoned BAe-125-700A was found in Honduras. It was suspected that the plane was connected to drug trade.

== Aircraft on display ==
Brazil

- FAB2113, a Brazilian Air Force VU-93 on display at the Museu Aeroespacial in Rio de Janeiro.

Canada

- N334PS, a Series 125/600A on display at the Alberta Aviation Museum, Edmonton, Alberta.

United Kingdom

- G-ARYB, Series 1 second prototype is on display at the Midland Air Museum, Coventry, England.
- G-ARYC, Series 1 third prototype and first production aircraft is on display at the de Havilland Aircraft Museum, London Colney, Hertfordshire, England.
- G-ASSM, a Series 1/522 is on display in the flight gallery at the Science Museum London, London, England.
- XS709, a Dominie T.1 is on display at the Royal Air Force Museum Cosford, Shropshire, England.
- XS726, a Hawker Siddeley Dominie T1 is on display at the Newark Air Museum, Nottinghamshire, England.
- XS735, a Hawker Siddeley Dominie T.1 is on display at the South Yorkshire Aircraft Museum, Doncaster, England.
- ZD620, a BAe 125 is on display at the Bournemouth Aviation Museum, Dorset, England.

United States

- N600MK, a Series 125/600A is sunk at the Athens Scuba Park in Athens, Texas for scuba divers to explore.
- N400PR is located at the Houston Hobby Airport's 1940 Terminal Museum tarmac. It was recently painted by local mural artist Mario Figuero, aka 'Gonzo247' in the early summer of 2019.

== Specifications (HS.125 Series 600) ==
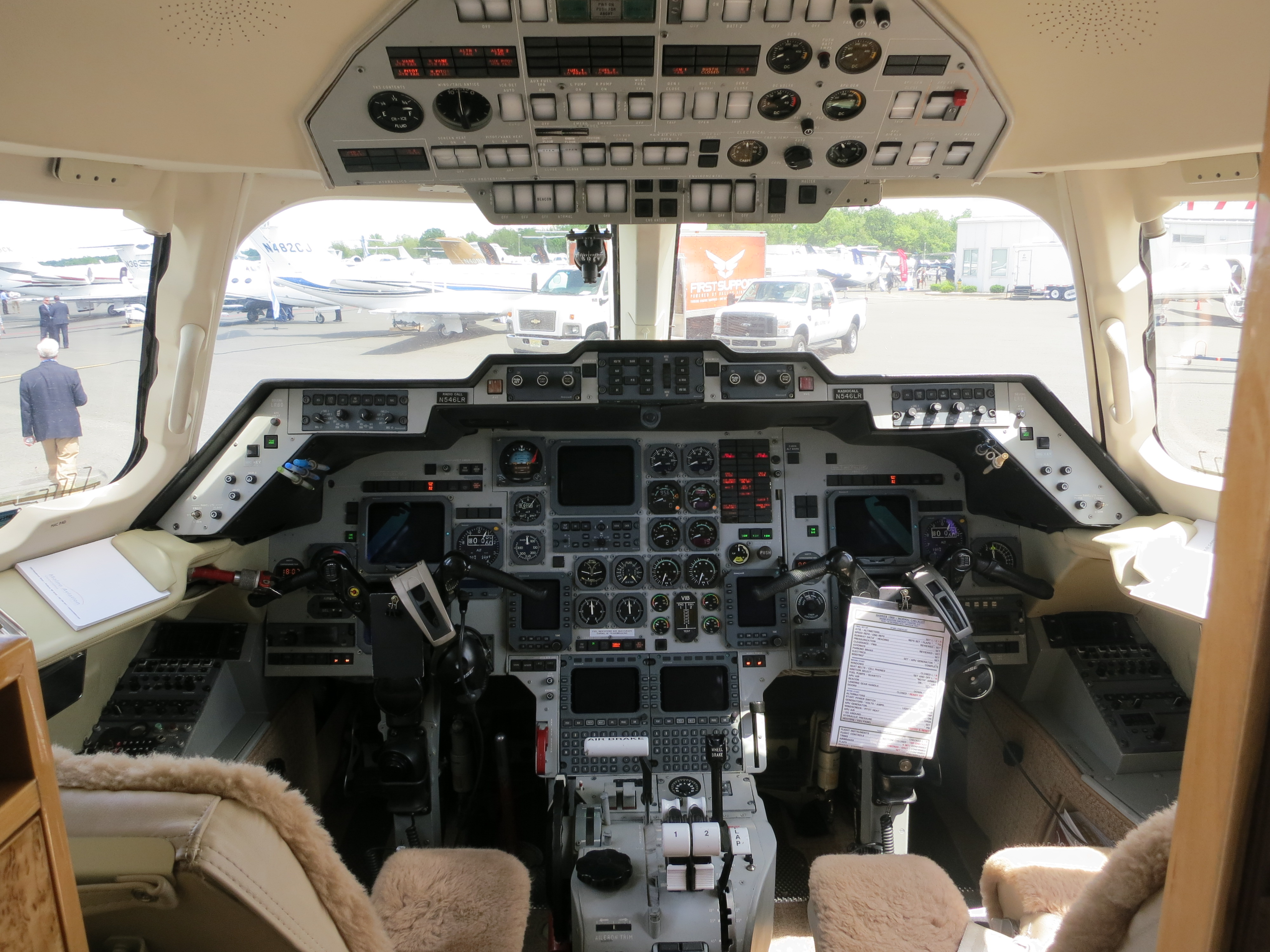
Cockpit of a Hawker 1000, 2012

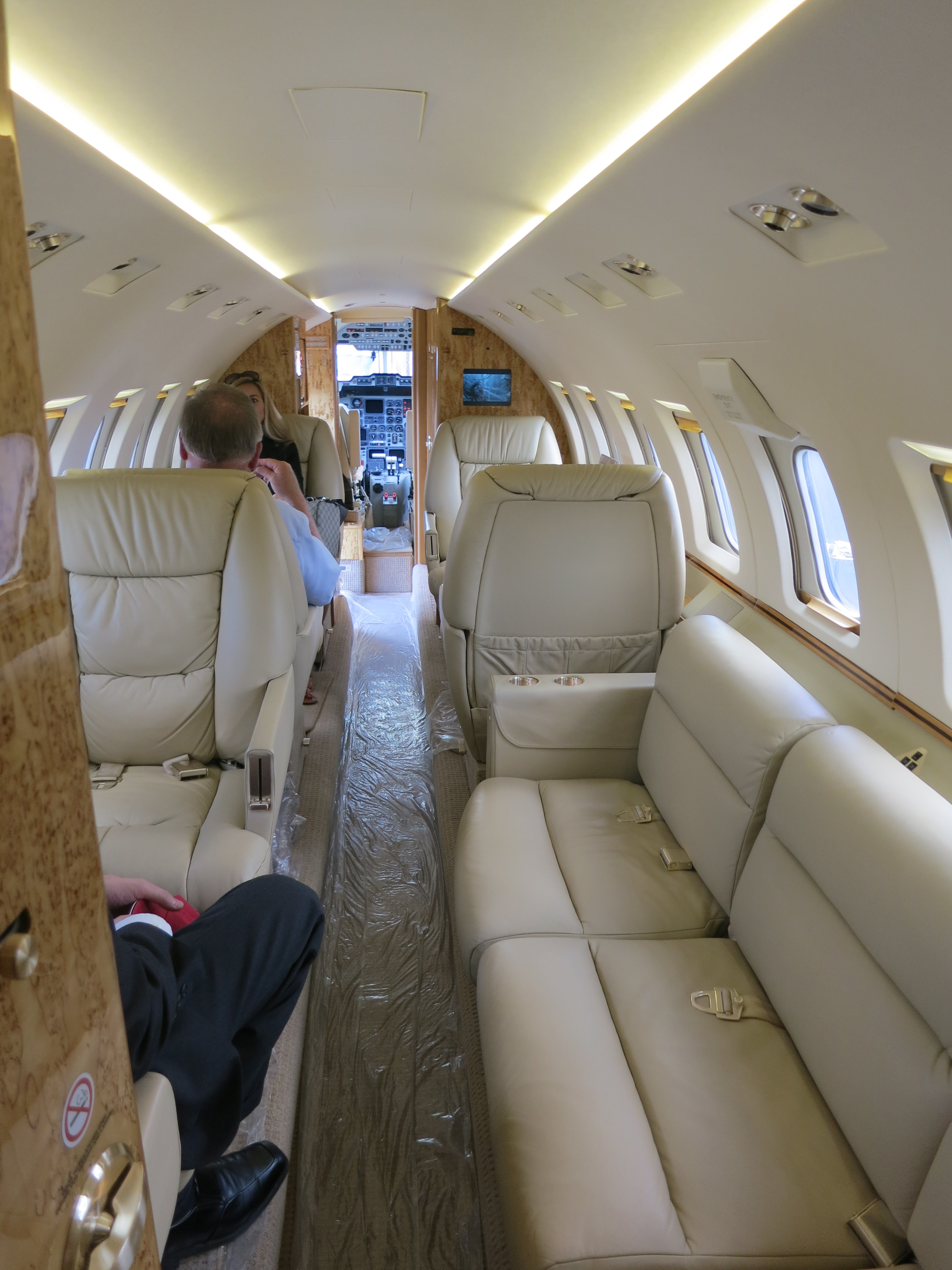
Cabin interior of Hawker 1000, 2012

Data from Jane's All The World's Aircraft 1976–77

General characteristics

- Crew: 2
- Capacity: 8 passengers (normal layout), 14 passengers in high density layout
- Length: 50 ft 6 in (15.39 m)
- Wingspan: 47 ft 0 in (14.33 m)
- Height: 17 ft 3 in (5.26 m)
- Wing area: 353.0 sq ft (32.79 m^{2})
- Aspect ratio: 6.25:1
- Empty weight: 12,530 lb (5,684 kg)
- Max takeoff weight: 25,000 lb (11,340 kg)
- Fuel capacity: 1,181 imp gal (1,418 US gal; 5,369 L) usable fuel
- Powerplant: 2 × Rolls-Royce Viper 601-22 turbojet engines, 3,750 lbf (16.7 kN) thrust each

PerformanceMaximum Operating Mach number (M_{MO}

- Maximum speed: Mach 0.78
- Cruise speed: 454 kn (522 mph, 841 km/h) maximum cruise at 28,000 ft (8,500 m)
- Stall speed: 83 kn (96 mph, 154 km/h) EAS flaps down
- Never exceed speed: 475 kn (547 mph, 880 km/h) IAS
- Range: 1,650 nmi (1,900 mi, 3,060 km) 1,000 lb (454 kg) payload, 45 minutes reserve plus allowances for take-off and landing
- Service ceiling: 41,000 ft (12,000 m)
- Rate of climb: 4,900 ft/min (25 m/s)
- Take-off run: 4,400 ft (1,300 m)
- Take-off balanced field length: 5,350 ft (1,630 m)
- Landing run: 3,400 ft (1,000 m) -600A at typical landing weight
- Landing distance from 50 ft (15 m): 2,130 ft (650 m) at typical landing weight

== See also ==
External videos
- Cockpit view of a Hawker 800XP during take off and landing
- Ground tour of a Hawker 800XP

Related development

- Hawker 800
- Hawker 4000

Aircraft of comparable role, configuration, and era

- Bombardier Challenger 600
- Cessna Citation
- Dassault Falcon
- Learjet 25

Related lists

- List of active United Kingdom military aircraft
- List of aircraft of the Royal Air Force
- List of military aircraft of the United States
