= Kawanishi H8K =

Imperial Japanese Navy flying boat

H8K
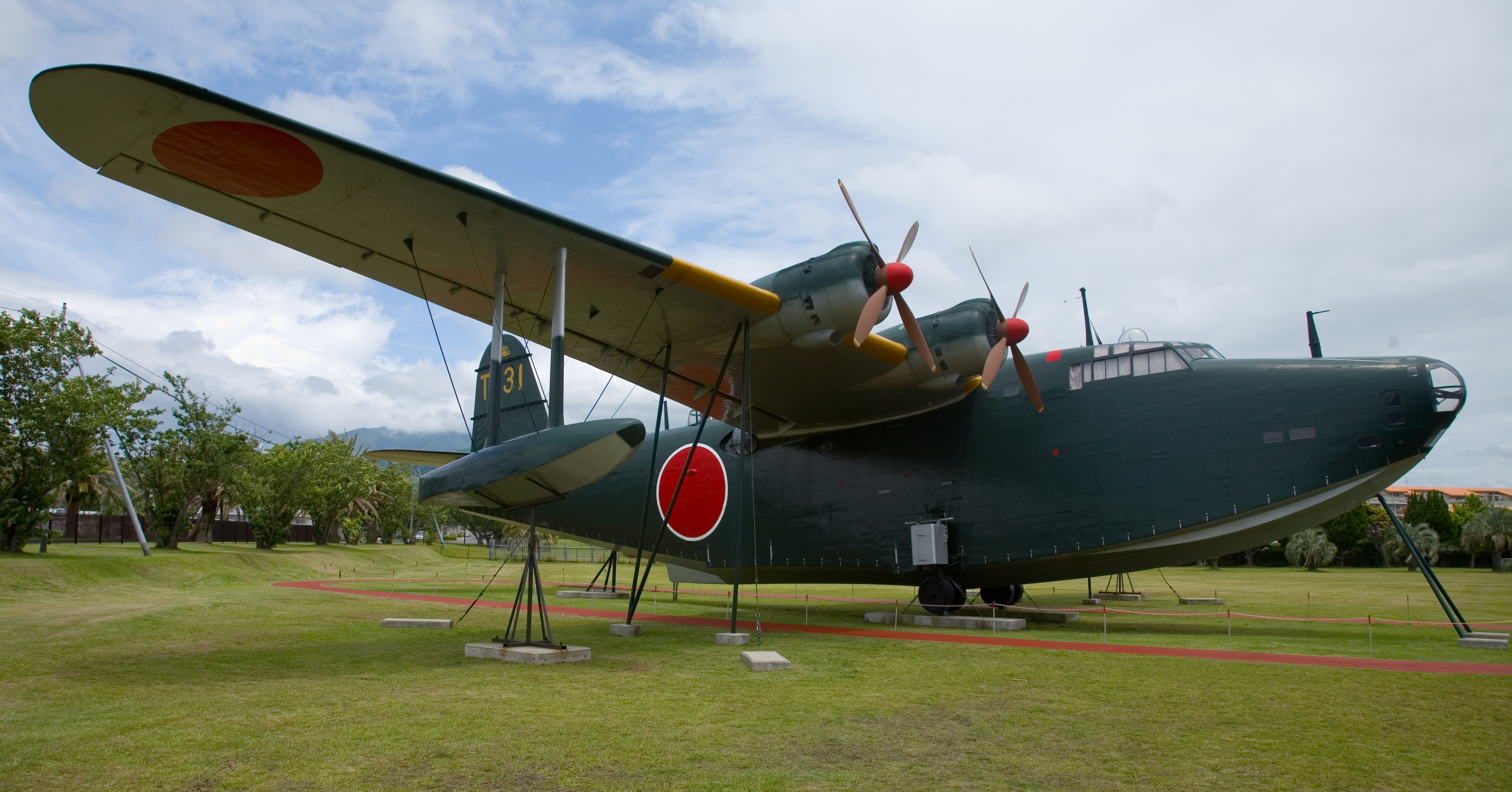
- Kawanishi H8K2 at Kanoya Museum, Japan

General information
- Type: Maritime patrol flying boat
- National origin: Japan
- Manufacturer: Kawanishi
- Designer: Shizuo Kikuhara
- Status: Retired
- Primary user: Imperial Japanese Navy Air Service
- Number built: 167

History
- Manufactured: 1941–1945
- Introduction date: February 1942
- First flight: January 1941
- Retired: 1945
- Developed from: Kawanishi H6K
- Variant: H8K2-L Seikū

The Kawanishi H8K was a large four-engined flying boat designed and produced by the Japanese aviation manufacturer Kawanishi. The Imperial Japanese Navy (IJN) designation was "Type 2 Flying Boat" (二式飛行艇, Nishiki Hikōtei); it was also referred to as "Type 2 Large-sized Flying Boat" (二式大型飛行艇, Nishiki-ō-gata hikō-tei), or "H2K flying boat" (二式大艇, Nishiki Taitei). The Allied reporting name for the type was "Emily".

The H8K was designed during late 1930s and early 1940s on behalf of the Imperial Japanese Navy (IJN) to perform long range maritime patrol or bombing missions, which were typically flown over vast distances of the ocean. It was produced to fulfil an ambitious specification for the era, seeking greater performance than several leading flying boats of the era, including the Short Sunderland and the Sikorsky XPBS-1. To achieve the 3,900 nautical mile range sought, 29 percent of the maximum take-off weight would be taken up by fuel alone. Extensive defensive measures, including armour, self-sealing fuel tanks, and numerous turret-mounted 20 mm cannon, were present across the flying boat. As originally designed, the H8K was powered by four Mitsubishi Mk4A Kasei 11 14-cylinder radial engines.

The first prototype made its maiden flight in January 1941; its initially-poor water handling was substantially improved via early modifications to the hull. The H8K conducted its first combat sortie in March 1942, using the type's long-distance capability to conduct a small-scale second raid on Pearl Harbor. It was flown by the Imperial Japanese Navy Air Service (IJNAAS) during World War II for maritime patrol duties. The flying boat's combination of effective heavy armour, powerful defensive armament, and relatively high speed led to the type often gaining the respect of pilots throughout its service in the Pacific theater. Aircraft historian René Francillon called the H8K "the most outstanding water-based combat aircraft of the Second World War."

== Design and development ==
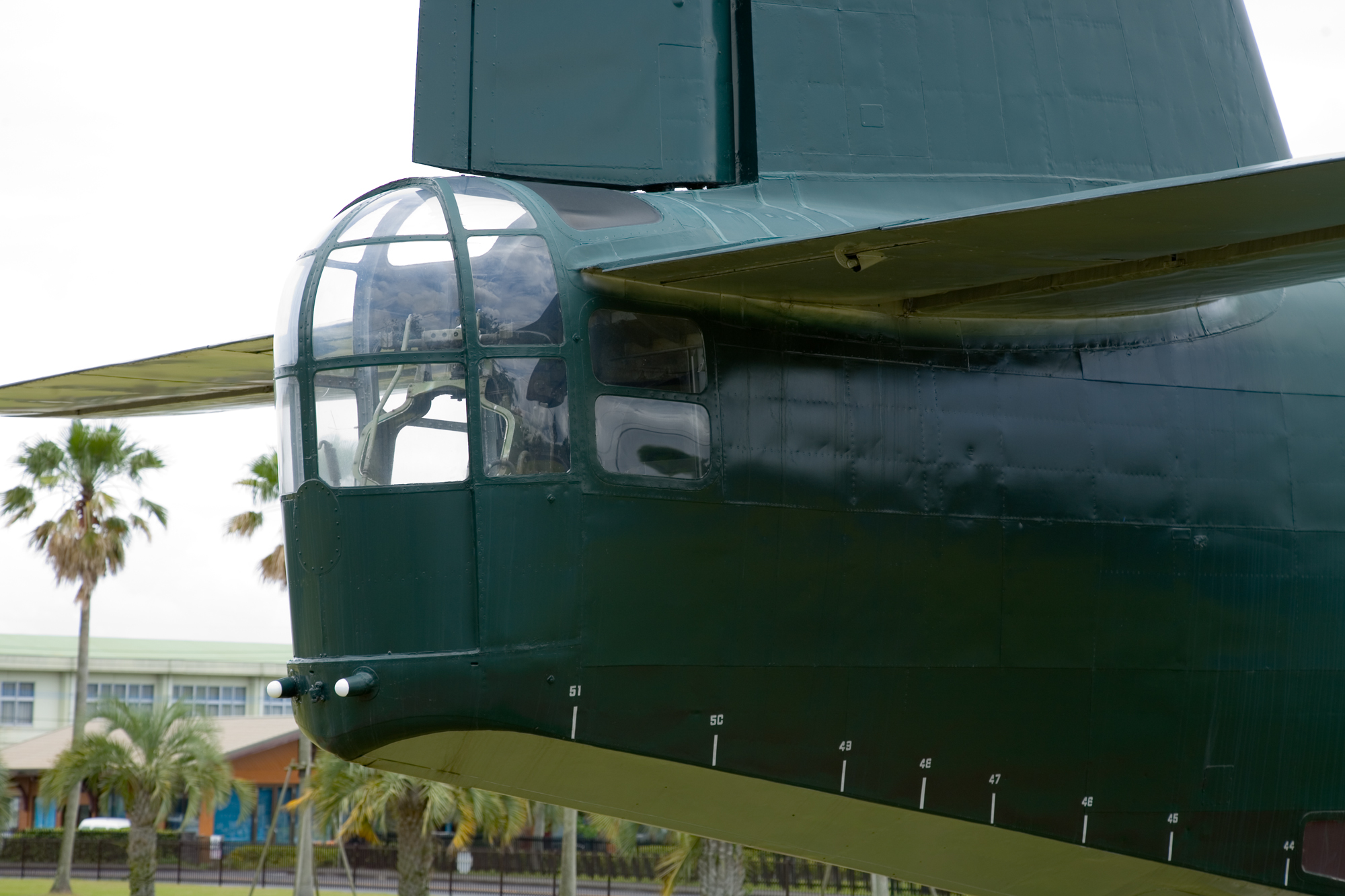
Tail gunner position (without gun)

The origins of the H8k can be traced back to mid 1938; in parallel to the completion of Kawanishi' then-latest flying boat, the Kawanishi H6K, the Imperial Japanese Navy (IJN) approached the company with a development contract to design a large four-engined maritime reconnaissance flying boat that would be capable of greater performance than the H6K. Specific stipulations of the associated specification, referred to as the Navy Experimental 13-Shi Large-size Flying Boat, included a range of 3,900 nautical miles while maintaining a cruising speed of no less than 160 knots. Furthermore, the maximum speed sought was 250 knots; the requested performance was in excess of contemporaries such as the Short Sunderland and the Sikorsky XPBS-1. In August 1938, Kawanishi started the design process, which was aided by the testing of scale models in both wind tunnels and water tanks.

The design team opted for a relatively clean high-wing cantilever monoplane configuration. To achieve the desired range, a total of six large fuel tanks were located within the hull worked in conjunction with eight smaller wing tanks; when full, fuel alone comprised 29 percent of the flying boat's maximum take-off weight. Unlike the comparatively unprotected wing tanks, the hull tanks featured a carbon dioxide-based fire suppression system and were partially self-sealing. The design of the hull tanks meant that if one were to leak, fuel would accumulate in the bilge, where it can be pumped into an undamaged tank. The H8K was equipped with extensive armour while defensive armaments comprised several flexibly-mounted 20 mm cannon that were installed in turrets on the nose, dorsal, tail, as well as in port and starboard blisters; flexibly-mounted 7.7 machine guns were also present in two side-hatches and a single ventral position. Power was provided by a total of four Mitsubishi Mk4A Kasei 11 14-cylinder radial engines, capable of producing up to 1,530 hp and driving four-bladed propellers. The amenities on board were also a substantial advance, featuring one of the first flushing toilets to be installed upon a flying boat.

On 31 December 1940, the first prototype was completed; one month later, it performed its maiden flight. Early test flights proved to be disappointing as the prototype exhibited unsatisfactory handling on the water; specifically, it would become unstable when the nose lifted during take-offs and high-speed taxiing. The prototype was modified, which included the deepening of the hull, redesigning of the planing bottom and the addition of spray strips under the nose; these measures largely rectified the undesirable water handling characteristics. The prototype continued to demonstrate inferior water handling than the preceding H6K but possessed superior flight performance. The prototype was joined by a pair of pre-production flying boats to accelerate the development program during 1941. In late 1941, the IJN authorised serial production to commence as the Navy Type 2 Flying Boat, Model 11.

The Imperial Japanese Navy Air Service (IJNAS) accepted the first production model, the H8K1, of which 14 would be built. The initial model would be quickly succeed by the improved H8K2 variant, which featured extremely heavy defensive armament that led to the type garnering a level of respect among opposing Allied aircrews. Other changes present on the H8K2 model from the H8K1 included the adoption of more powerful engines, the revised armament, and an increase in fuel capacity. The H8K2 would be the definitive variant of the type, 112 flying boats of this model alone would be produced. The H8K has been widely regarded as the best flying boat active during World War II.

One feature that had been discarded during the type's original development cycle was the adoption of retractable floats for greater speed while in the air; however, most models of the H8K were equipped with traditional fixed floats instead in order to save weight. In 1943, work on the idea resumed for the H8K3 model. Other changes on this model included the replacement of the side blisters with sliding hatches and the revision of the dorsal turret to be fully retractable. Furthermore, some of the later-built models were equipped with air-to-surface radar, which proved to be capable of detecting submarines.

36 examples of a dedicated transport version, the H8K2-L Seikū (晴空, Clear Sky), were also produced, which was capable of carrying up to 62 troops. The relatively deep hull permitted the installation of two decks, the lower of which extended from the nose to the rear full step while the upper deck ran from the wing's centre-section to the rear of the hull. To increase the internal volume available, the hull tanks were eliminated, which considerably reduced this models' range. The side defensive blisters, ventral defensive hatch, and dorsal turret were also discarded.

== Operational history ==
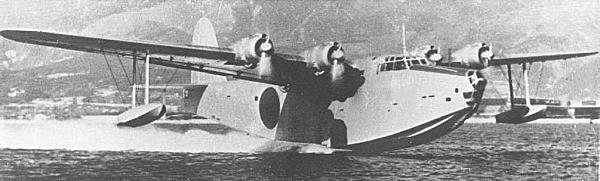
H8K1 supplementary prototype number 2 taking off in February 1942.

Seeking to take advantage of its exceptional range capabilities, Japanese military planners decided that the H8K's first operational mission would be a second raid on Pearl Harbor. Since the target lay out of range for the flying boats, this audacious plan involved a refuelling by submarine at French Frigate Shoals, some 900 km (560 mi) north-west of Hawaii, en route. On the night of 4 March 1942, two K8Ks departed the Yokohama Kōkūtai (Naval Air Corps) for Pearl Harbor; however, on account of poor visibility due to inclement weather, the mission did not result in any significant damage being achieved. Six days after this raid, one of the H8K was sent on a daylight photo-reconnaissance mission of Midway Atoll. It was intercepted by radar-directed Brewster F2A Buffalo fighters of Marine Fighting Squadron 221 (VMF-221) and shot down, resulting in all personnel aboard being killed, including Lt. Hashizume Hisao, the lead pilot of the second raid.

H8K2s were used on a wide range of patrol, reconnaissance, bombing, and transport missions throughout the Pacific War. Three submarine kills were accomplished on account of the H8K's air-to-surface radar unit.

== Variants ==
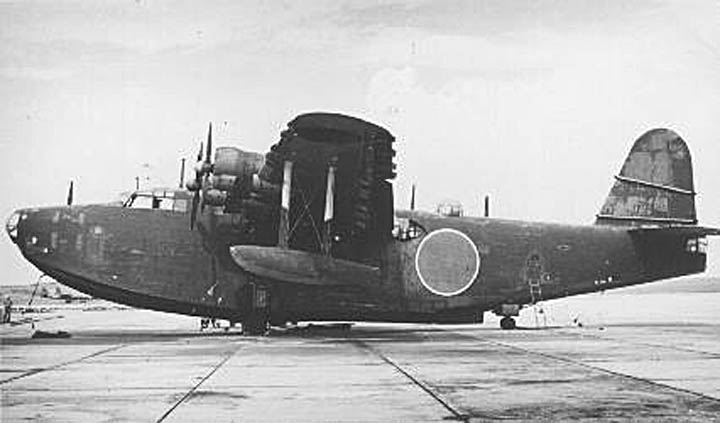
A H8K2 Type 2 Flying Boat ashore.

An H8K2 51-085 of the 851st Kōkutai in flight, immediately before being shot down by the U.S. Navy PB4Y-1 from which the photograph was taken, 2 July 1944.

H8K1 Experimental Type 13 Large-sized Flying boat (13試大型飛行艇 13-Shi Ōgata Hikōtei)
One prototype and four supplementary prototypes. The prototype was powered by Mitsubishi Mk4A Kasei 11 engines while the supplementary prototype was equipped with Mitsubishi MK4B Kasei 12 engines. Supplementary prototypes was redesignated Type 2 Flying Boat Model 11 on 5 February 1942. The prototype was rebuilt into a H8K1-L in November 1943.
H8K1 Type 2 Flying boat, Model 11 (二式飛行艇11型 Nishiki Hikōtei 11-gata)
Developed on 5 February 1942. First operative model of the series, 12 produced. Powered by Mitsubishi MK4B Kasei 12 engines.

H8K1-L Type 2 Transport Flying Boat (二式輸送艇 Nishiki Yusōtei)

Rebuilt from H8K1 prototype. Fitted augment exhausts. Up to 41 passengers.
H8K2 Type 2 Flying boat, Model 12 (二式飛行艇12型 Nishiki Hikōtei 12-gata)
Developed on 26 June 1943. Powered by Mitsubishi MK4Q Kasei 22 engines and outfitted with an improved tail gun turret. Latter batch was equipped with Air-Surface Vessel (ASV) search radar, and removed side gun blisters. 112 produced.

H8K2-L Seikū, Model 32 (晴空32型 Seikū 32-gata)

Transport version of H8K2. Initial named Type 2 Transport Flying Boat, Model 32. Armaments were 1 × forward-firing 20 mm cannon and 1 × rearward-firing 13 mm machine gun. Up to 64 passengers.
H8K3 Provisional name Type 2 Flying Boat, Model 22 (仮称二式飛行艇22型 Kashō Nishiki Hikōtei 22-gata)
Experimental version, H8K2 modified. Equipped with retractable floats in wingtips, Fowler flaps, sliding hatch side gun locations in place of the blisters and a retractable dorsal turret, all in an effort to increase speed; two prototypes only (work number 596 and 597).
H8K4 Provisional name Type 2 Flying Boat, Model 23 (仮称二式飛行艇23型 Kashō Nishiki Hikōtei 23-gata)
H8K3 re-engined with 1,825 hp MK4T Mitsubishi Kasei 25b engines, two converted from H8K3.

H8K4-L Provisional name Seikū, Model 33 (仮称晴空33型 Kashō Seikū 33-gata)

Transport version of H8K4. Abandoned due to priority being given to fighters for home island defense, so no more H8Ks were being produced.

There was also a proposed land-based attack bomber variant (project only), often called "G9K Gunzan" as a retroactively extrapolated designation following the IJN naming system.

== Operators ==
(Empire of Japan) Japan

- Imperial Japanese Navy Air Service
  - Saeki Kōkutai
  - Sasebo Kōkutai
  - Takuma Kōkutai
  - Yokohama Kōkutai
  - Yokosuka Kōkutai
  - 14th Kōkutai
  - 801st Kōkutai
  - 802nd Kōkutai
  - 851st Kōkutai
  - 901st Kōkutai
  - 902nd Kōkutai
  - 951st Kōkutai
  - 1001st Kōkutai
  - 1021st Kōkutai
  - 1081st Kōkutai
- Miscellaneous
  - Yokosuka Naval District
  - 11th Naval Air Arsenal
  - 11th Air Fleet
- Kamikaze
  - Azusa group (picked from 801st Kōkutai, guidance only)

== Surviving aircraft ==
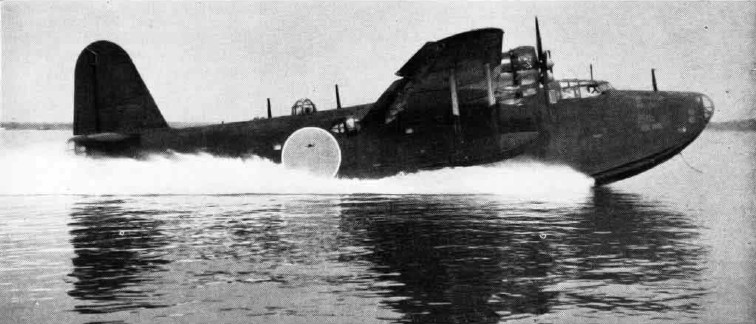
A captured H8K taking off at the U.S. Navy Naval Air Test Center at Patuxent River, Maryland, United States in 1946–47.

Four aircraft survived until the end of the war. One of these, an H8K2 (work number 426), was captured by U.S. forces at the end of the conflict and was evaluated before being eventually returned to Japan in 1979. It was on display at Tokyo's Museum of Maritime Science until 2004, when it was moved to Kanoya Air Base Museum at Kanoya Air Field in Kagoshima.

The submerged remains of an H8K can be found off the west coast of Saipan, where it is a popular scuba diving attraction known erroneously as the "B-29", or the "Emily". Another wrecked H8K lies in Chuuk Lagoon, Chuuk, in Micronesia. This aircraft is located off the south-western end of Dublon Island.

== Specifications (Kawanishi H8K2) ==
Kawanishi H8K3

Data from Japanese Aircraft of the Pacific War

General characteristics

- Crew: 10
- Length: 28.13 m (92 ft 3 in)
- Wingspan: 38 m (124 ft 8 in)
- Height: 9.15 m (30 ft 0 in)
- Wing area: 160 m^{2} (1,700 sq ft)
- Empty weight: 18,380 kg (40,521 lb)
- Gross weight: 24,500 kg (54,013 lb)
- Max takeoff weight: 32,500 kg (71,650 lb)
- Fuel capacity: 18,880 L (4,150 imp gal; 4,990 US gal)
- Powerplant: 4 × Mitsubishi MK4Q Kasei 22 14-cylinder air-cooled radial piston engines:
  - 1,380 kW (1,850 hp) for take-off
  - 1,253 kW (1,680 hp) at 2,100 m (6,900 ft)
  - 1,148 kW (1,540 hp) at 5,500 m (18,000 ft)
- Propellers: 4-bladed constant-speed propellers

Performance

- Maximum speed: 467 km/h (290 mph, 252 kn) at 5,000 m (16,000 ft)
- Cruise speed: 296 km/h (184 mph, 160 kn) at 4,000 m (13,000 ft)
- Range: 7,152 km (4,444 mi, 3,862 nmi)
- Service ceiling: 8,850 m (29,040 ft)
- Time to altitude: 5,000 m (16,000 ft) in ten minutes and 12 seconds
- Wing loading: 153.1 kg/m^{2} (31.4 lb/sq ft)
- Power/mass: 0.225 kW/kg (0.137 hp/lb)

Armament

- Guns:
  - 5 × 20 mm (0.787 in) Type 99 Mark 1 machine gun (1 each in bow, dorsal, and tail turrets, plus one each in two waist blisters)
  - 5 × 7.7 mm (0.303 in) Type 92 machine guns in fuselage hatches
- Bombs: 2 × 800 kg (1,800 lb) torpedoes or 2,000 kg (4,400 lb) of bombs or depth charges

Avionics

- Mark VI Model 1 ASV radar

== See also ==
Aircraft of comparable role, configuration, and era

- Blohm & Voss BV 222
- Boeing 314 Clipper
- Consolidated PB2Y Coronado
- Martin PBM Mariner
- Short Sunderland
- Short Seaford

Related lists

- List of aircraft of World War II
- List of military aircraft of Japan
- List of flying boats and floatplanes
