= Kanoya Air Base Museum =

Aerospace museum in Japan

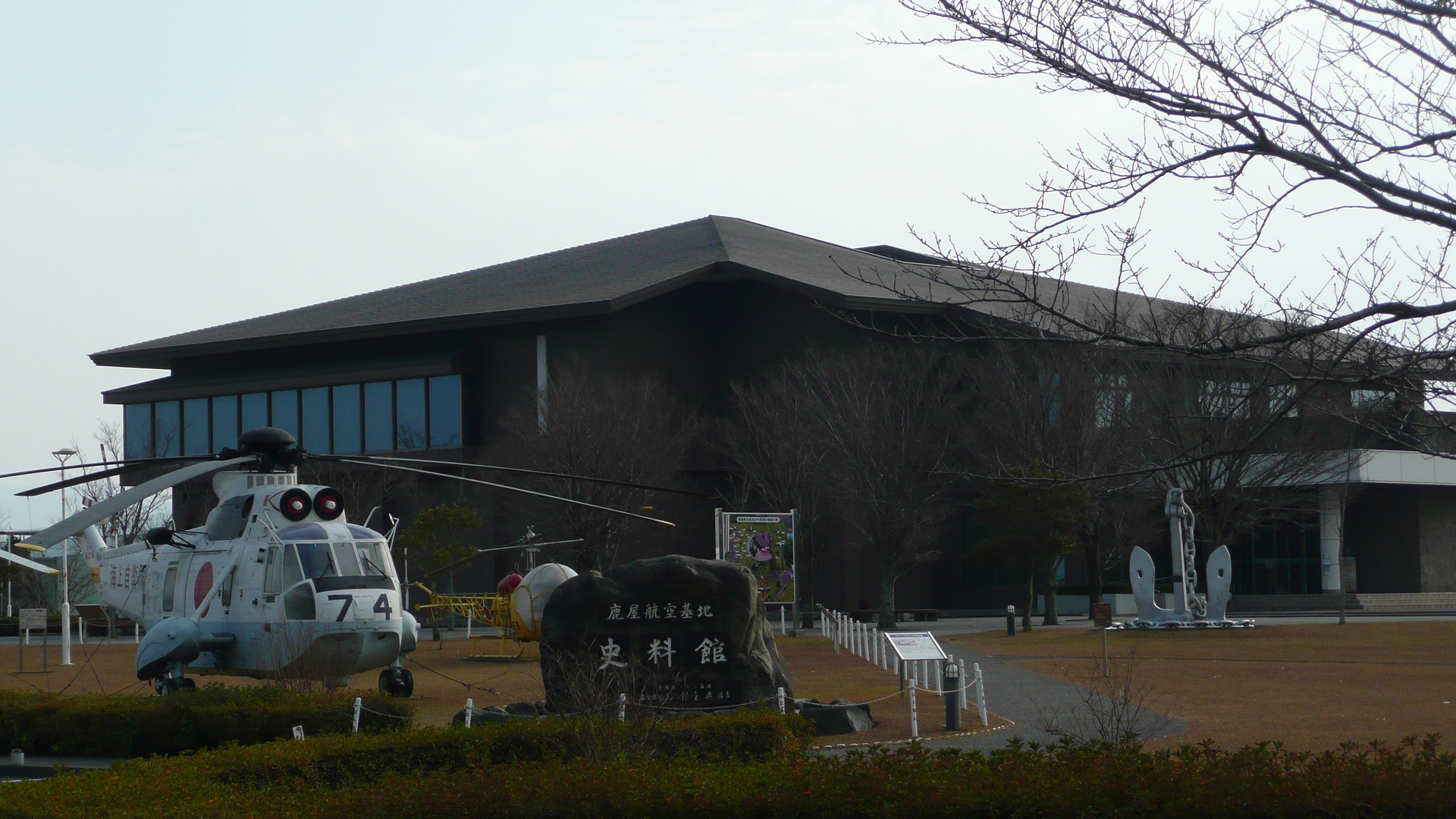
- Interactive map of the Kanoya Air Base Museum area

General information
- Location: Kanoya, Kagoshima Prefecture, Japan
- Coordinates: 31.3809526°N 130.836838°E

Website
- www.mod.go.jp/msdf/kanoya/toukatu/18siryoukann.html

Kanoya Air Base Museum (海上自衛隊鹿屋航空基地史料館, Kaijōjieitai kanoyakōkūkichishiryōkan) is an aerospace museum of the Japan Air Self-Defense Force in the city of Kanoya, Kagoshima Prefecture, Japan. The museum is located adjacent to Kanoya Air Field.

== History ==
The museum opened in December 1973 (Showa 48) and reopened in July 1993 as the “New Historical Museum”. By exhibiting photographs, documents, and actual equipment (restored) from the days of the Imperial Japanese Navy Kanoya Air Base to the modern Maritime Self-Defense Force, the actual situation of the war and the Japanese Special Attack Units, the transition and activities of the equipment of the modern Maritime Self-Defense Force. It is intended that the meaning of protecting Japan will be understood by clarifying such things. The number of stored materials is about 5,500.

== Aircraft on display ==
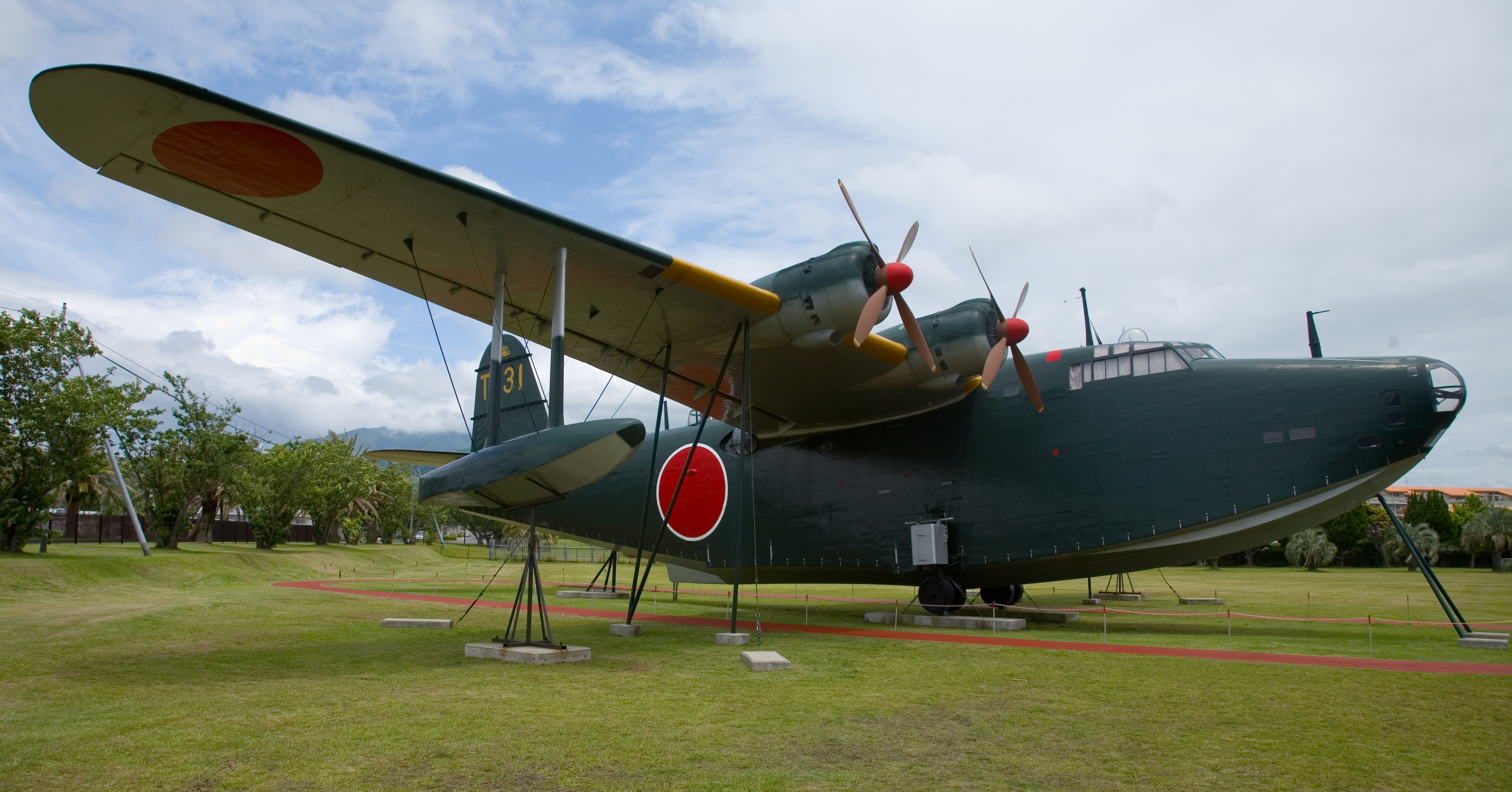
A Kawanishi H8K2 Type 2 flying boat

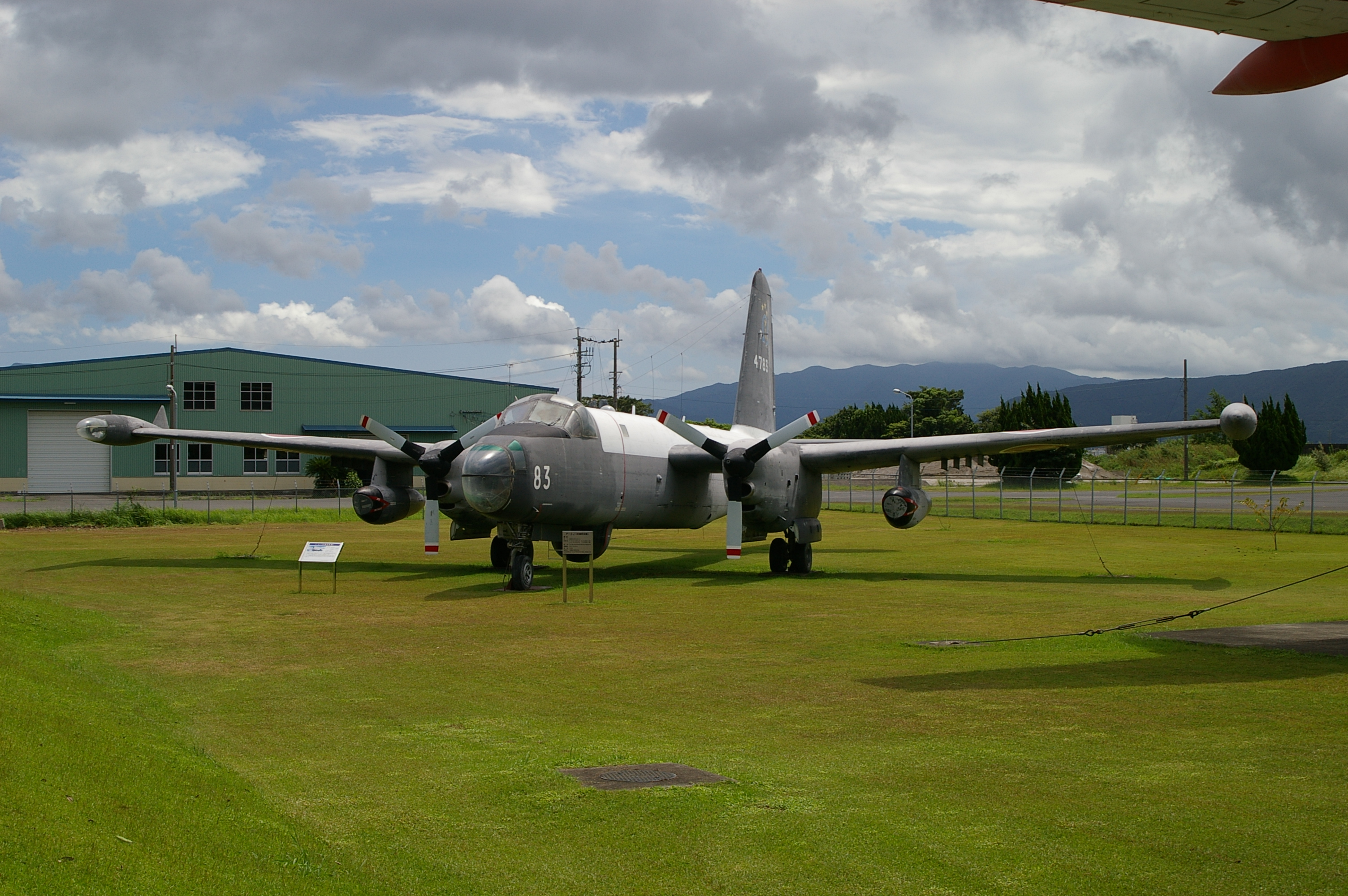
Antisubmarine patrol aircraft P-2J

- Shin Meiwa US-1A
- Kawasaki P-2J
- Grumman S2F-1
- B-65
- Bell 47
- HSS-2A
- P2V-7
- OH-6D
- V-107
- SNB
- R4D-6
- Beechcraft T-34 Mentor
- Fuji KM-2
- The world's last original Kawanishi H8K type 2 Nishiki Ogata Hikotei
