= Flight Check Squadron (JASDF) =

- 飛行点検隊
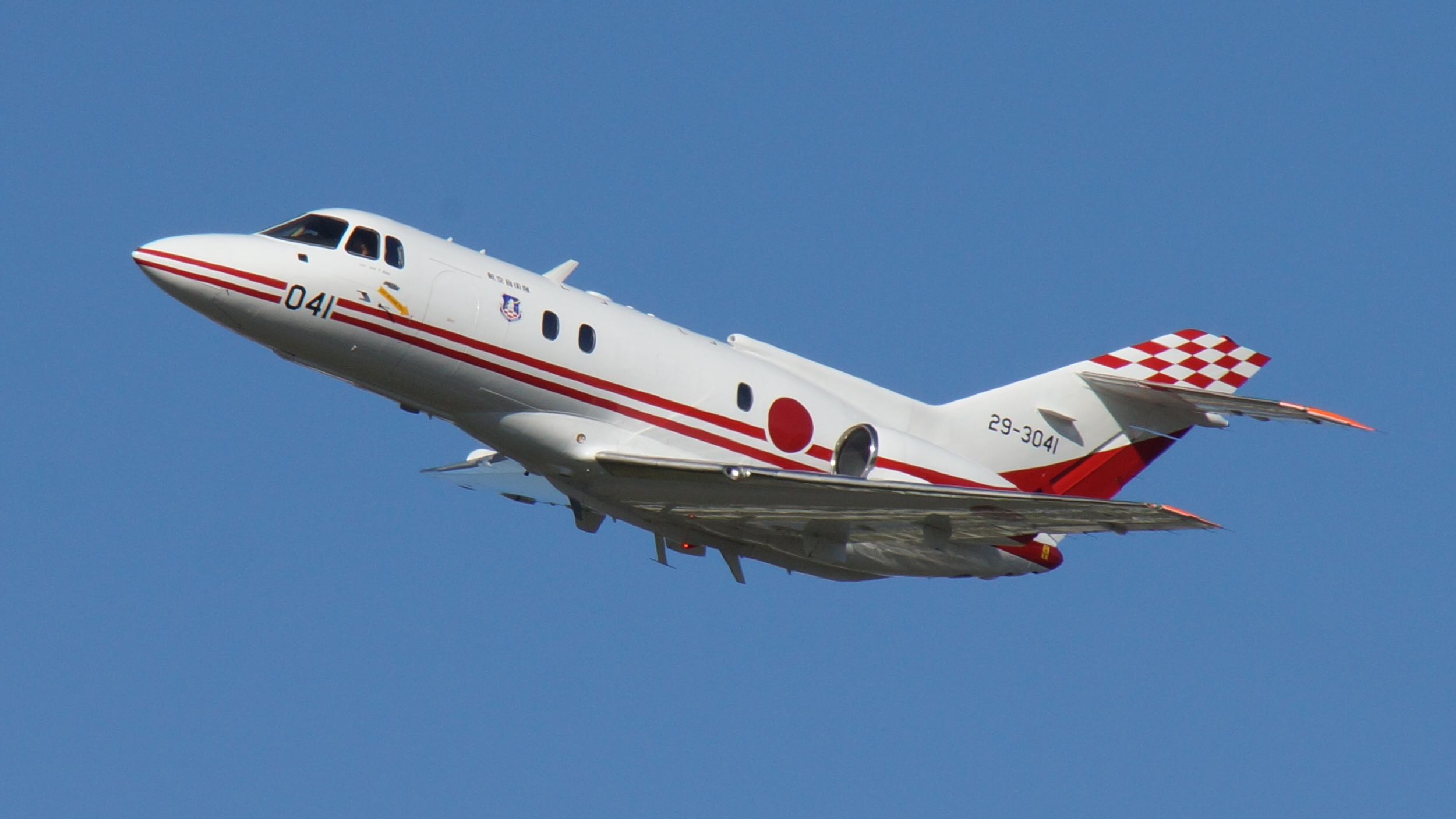
- Flight Check Squadron U-125 (2017)
- Active: October 1, 1958
- Country: Japan
- Allegiance: Air Support Command
- Branch: Japan Air Self-Defense Force
- Garrison/HQ: Iruma Air Base

Aircraft flown
- YS-11FC, U-125

Flight Check Squadron (飛行点検隊, hikoutenkentai) is a unit of the Japan Air Self-Defense Force based at Iruma Air Base in Saitama Prefecture north of Tokyo. Under the authority of Air Support Command, it operates YS-11FC and U-125 aircraft. Prior to the U-125 the unit operated Mitsubishi MU-2 aircraft.

On April 6 2016 a U-125 aircraft operated by the unit crashed near Kanoya Air Base of the Japan Maritime Self-Defense Force in Kagoshima Prefecture, with all six crew members being killed. It had been checking the base's air navigation aid system.

In 2021 the YS-11FCs and the lost U-125 will be replaced with three Cessna Citation Latitude 680A aircraft.

== Gallery ==
Aircraft

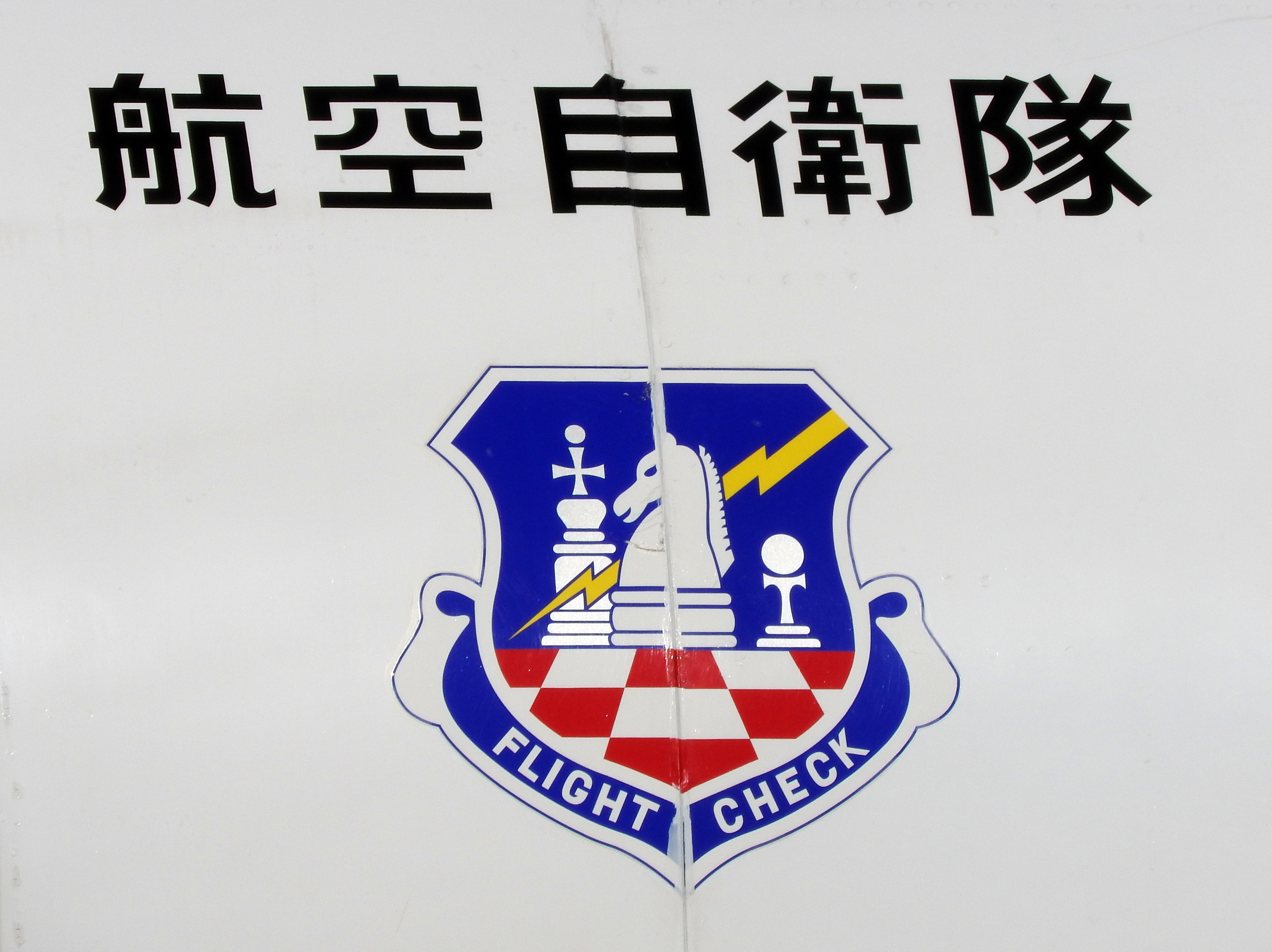
Squadron insignia on U-125 (2016)

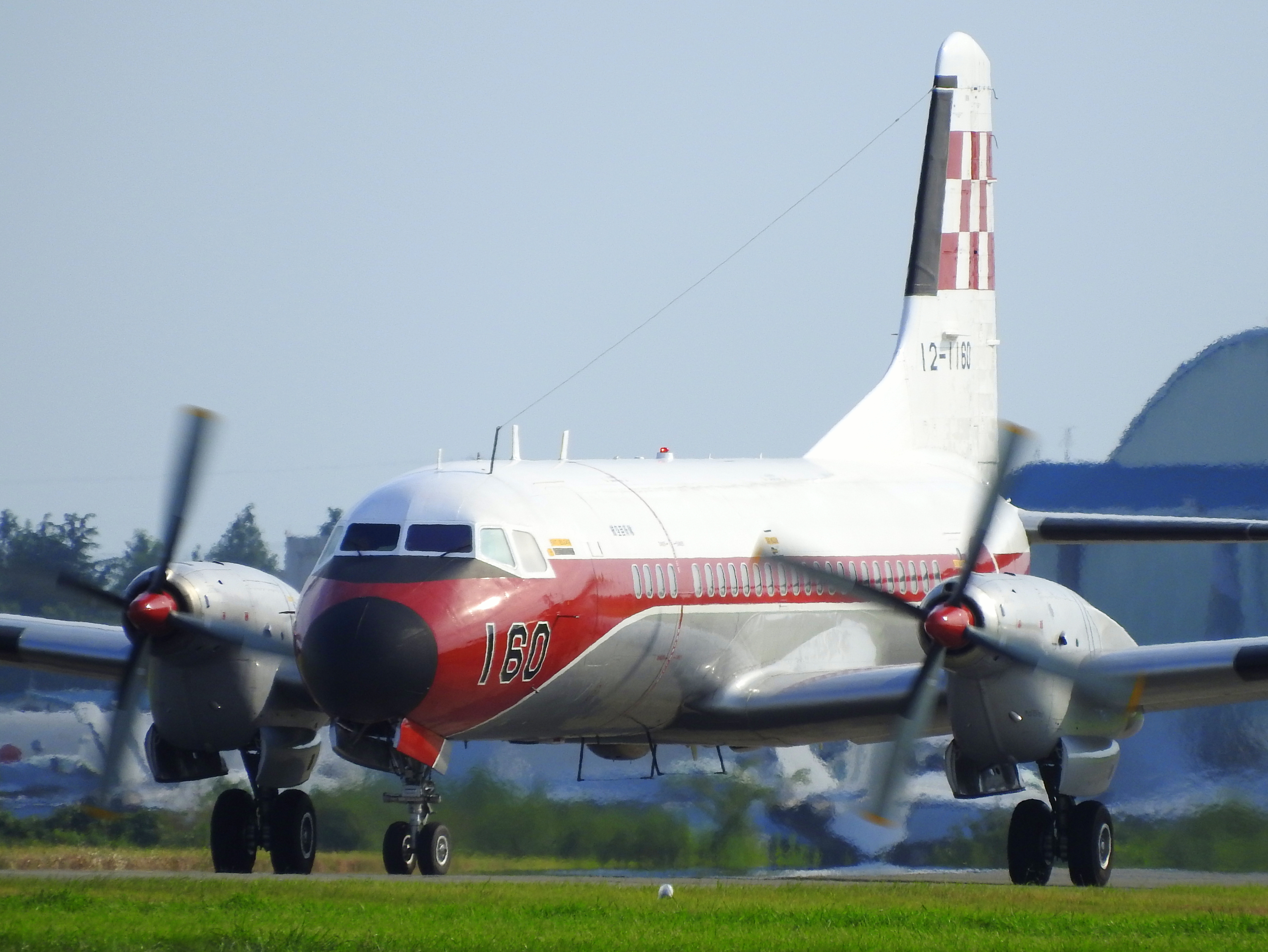
YS-11FC (2016)

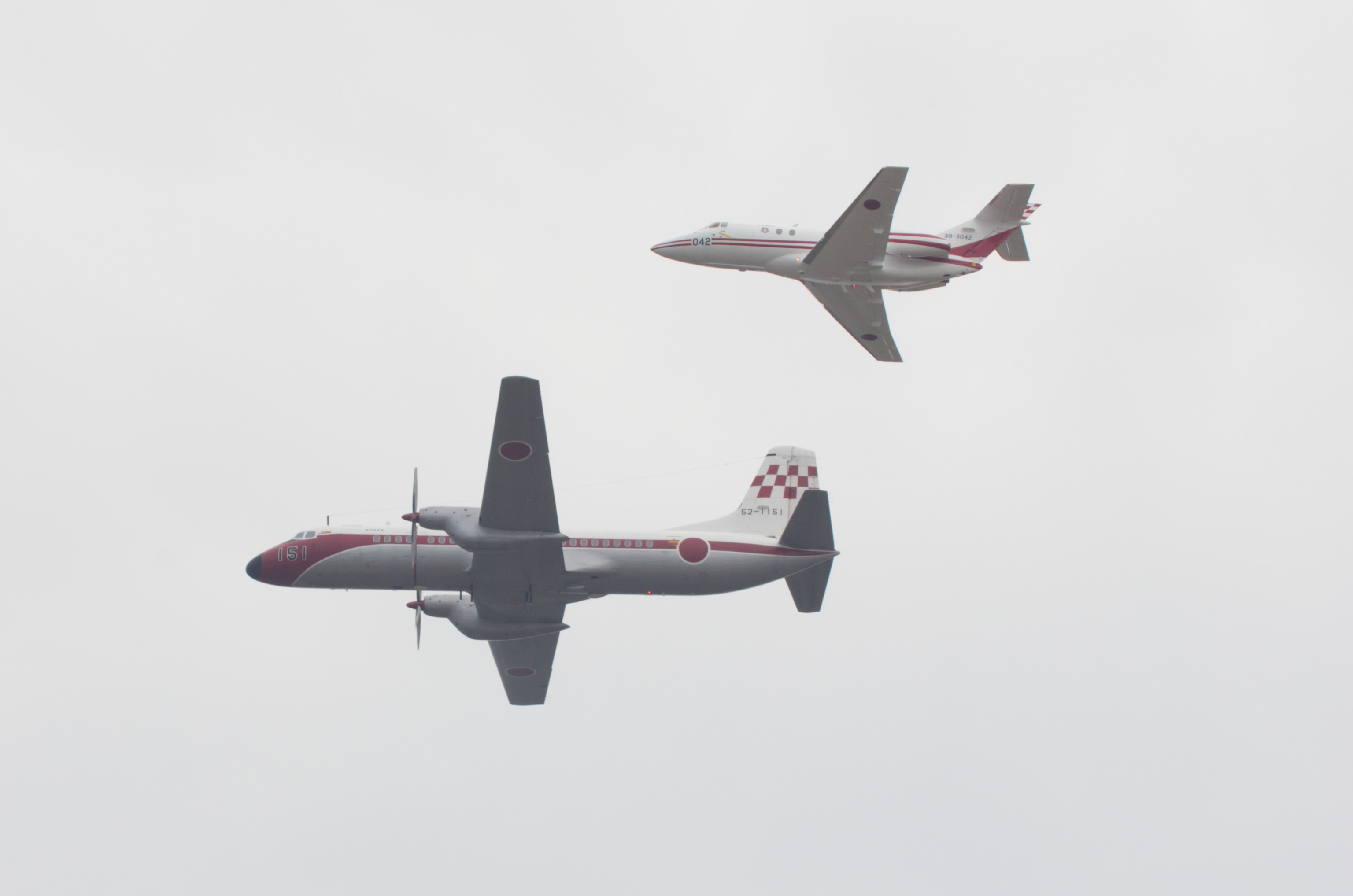
YS-11FC and U-125 of the Flight Check Squadron (2011)
