= Kanoya Air Field =

Airport in Kanoya, Kagoshima, Japan

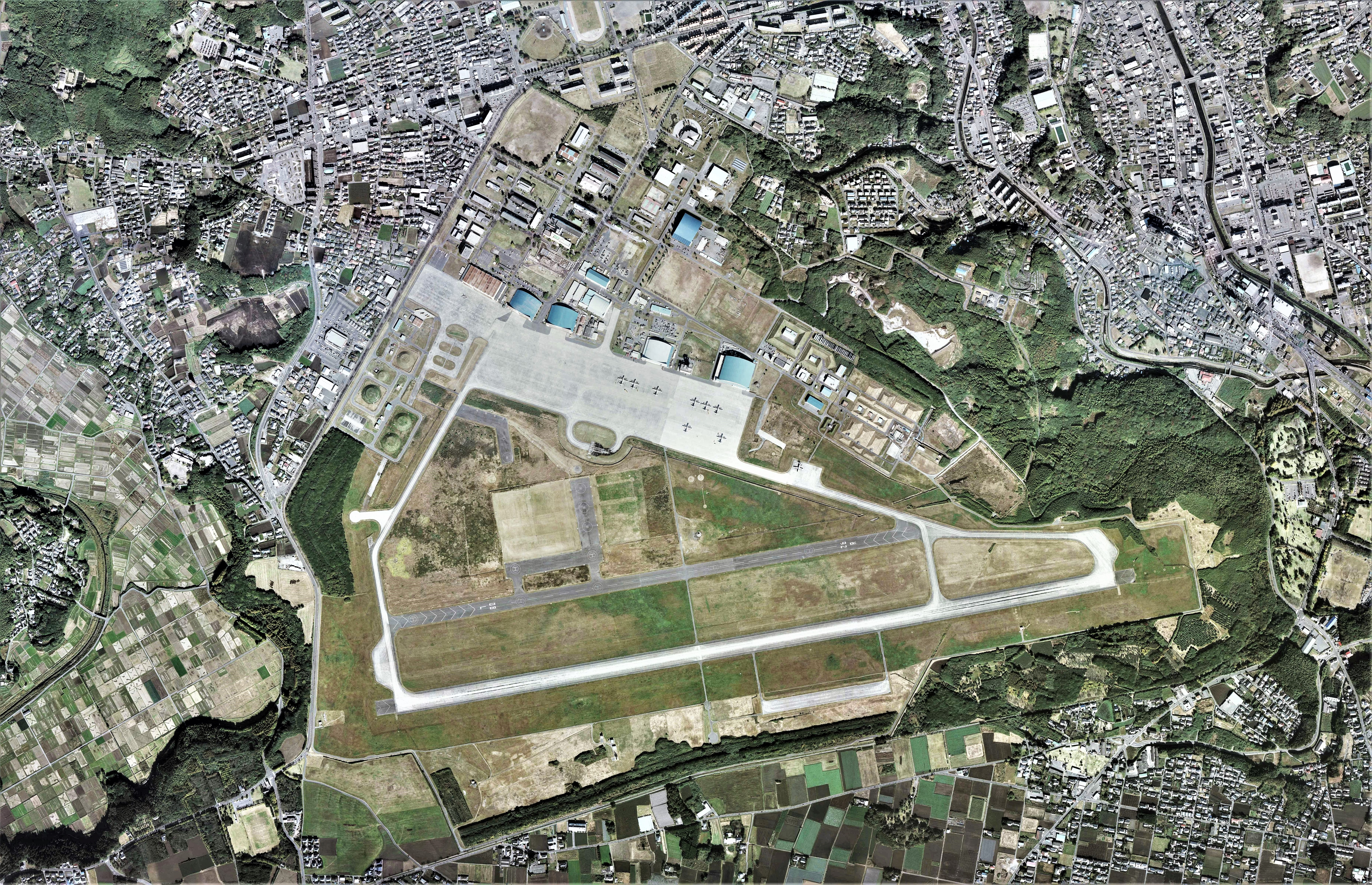
- IATA: none; ICAO: RJFY

Summary
- Airport type: Military
- Operator: Japan Maritime Self-Defense Force
- Location: Kanoya, Japan
- Elevation AMSL: 214 ft (65 m)
- Coordinates: 31°22′05″N 130°50′17″E

Map
- Location in Japan

Runways
Direction	Length		Surface
Direction	m	ft	Surface
08R/26L	2,250	7,382	Concrete
08L/26R	1,200	3,937	Concrete
- Source: Japanese AIP at AIS Japan

Kanoya Air Field (鹿屋飛行場, Kanoya Hikōjō) (ICAO: RJFY) is a military aerodrome of the Japan Maritime Self-Defense Force Kanoya Air Base (鹿屋航空基地, Kanoya Kōkū-Kichi). It is located 1.5 NM (2.8 km; 1.7 mi) southwest of the city of Kanoya in Kagoshima Prefecture, Japan. Runway 08R/26L is equipped with ILS.

== History ==
The Kanoya Air Group was formed on 1 April 1936 and was the oldest medium bomber (rikko) air group in Imperial Japanese Navy, along with the Kisarazu Air Group. It initially was equipped with Type 96 Mitsubishi G3M medium bombers and first saw combat during the Second Sino-Japanese War from August 1937. In September 1941, was re-equipped with the new Type 1 Mitsubishi G4M medium bombers. At the start of Pacific War, Kanoya Air Group was considered the most highly trained medium bomber unit in torpedo attacks and fought in most battles through the end of the war. After the Battle of Okinawa, Kanoya became the main base for the Operation Kikusui kamikaze operations. Following the end of the war, Kanoya was under control of the United States Fifth Air Force from September 3, 1945 to November 1948.

On December 1, 1950 the National Police Reserve, the predecessor to the Japan Self-Defense Force, established a garrison at Kanoya.The base was initially shared by ground and naval forces, but on November 21, 1955 the entire base came under the control of the Japan Maritime Self-Defense Force. It hosted the 1st Air Group, Kanoya Educational Aviation Group, and Kanoya Aircraft Workshop.

After some years of discussion it was announced in July 2018 that the base would be used by the US military. United States Marine Corps KC-130 aerial tankers will use the base.

The Kanoya Air Base Museum is located at the base.

== Accidents ==
On April 6, 2016 a U-125 airplane operated by the Flight Check Squadron of the Japan Air Self-Defense Force crashed near the base, and all six crew members were killed. It had been checking the base's air navigation aid system.
