= JS Kurama =

Destroyer of the Japan Maritime Self-Defense Force

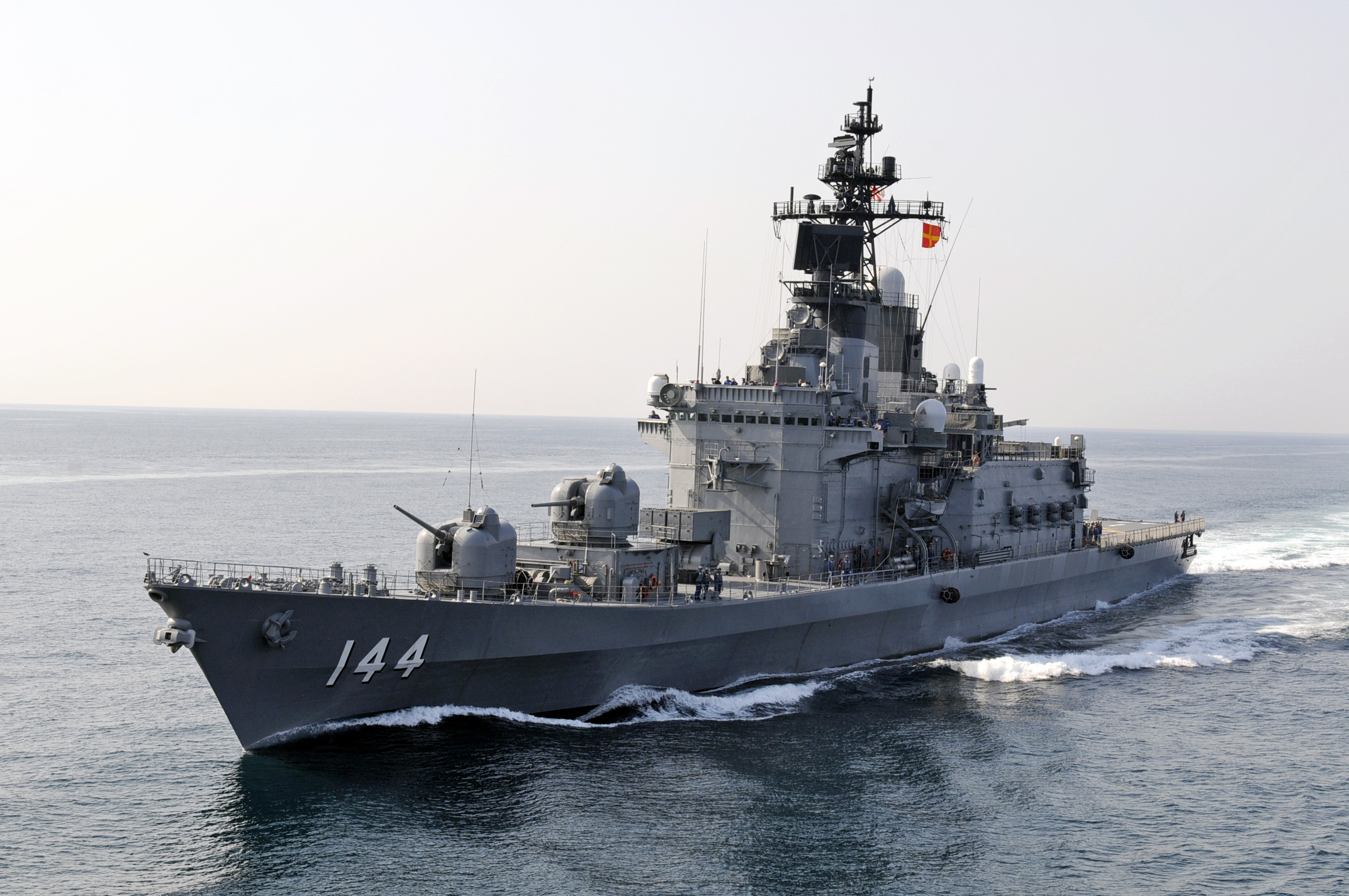
- JS Kurama during Exercise Malabar 2009

History

Japan
- Name: Kurama; (くらま)
- Namesake: Mount Kurama
- Ordered: 1976
- Builder: IHI, Tokyo
- Laid down: 17 February 1978
- Launched: 20 September 1979
- Commissioned: 27 March 1981
- Decommissioned: 22 March 2017
- Refit: 16 May 2003
- Home port: Sasebo (1981-2017)
- Identification: MMSI number: 431999502; Pennant number: DDH-144
- Fate: Sunk as target, June 2018

General characteristics
- Class & type: Shirane-class destroyer
- Displacement: 5,200 long tons (5,300 t) standard; 7,500 long tons (7,600 t) full load
- Length: 159 m (522 ft)
- Beam: 17.5 m (57 ft)
- Draft: 5.3 m (17 ft)
- Propulsion: 2 × IHI boilers 850 psi (60 kg/cm², 5.9 MPa), 430 °C; 2 × turbines; 2 shafts; 70,000 shp (52 MW)
- Speed: 31 knots (36 mph; 57 km/h)
- Complement: 350; 20 staff
- Armament: Sea Sparrow SAM launcher; ASROC Mk 112 octuple launcher; 2 × FMC 5"/54 caliber Mark 42 guns; 2 × 20 mm Phalanx CIWS; 2 × Mark 32 triple torpedo tubes (Mk-46 torpedoes)
- Aircraft carried: 3 × SH-60J(K) anti-submarine helicopters

JS Kurama (DDH-144) was the second ship of the Shirane-class destroyer in service with the Japan Maritime Self-Defense Force (JMSDF).

== Construction and career ==
Kurama was laid down on 17 February 1978 and launched on 20 September 1979 by IHI Corporation Tokyo Shipyard. She was commissioned on 27 March 1981, into the 2nd Escort Corps (Sasebo) together with JDS Haruna. She was the first Maritime Self-Defense Force ship to be equipped with Phalanx CIWS. She was also equipped for the first time with a sonar that can detect submarines over long distances, and, in cooperation with the onboard helicopter, can detect and destroy enemy submarines before they approach. Based on the track record of this ship, CIWS and tactical towed sonar were adopted as general-purpose escort vessels of the Maritime Self-Defense Force built after that, in which it became standard equipment.

On October 13, 1982, a boiler explosion accident occurred at Sasebo.

On March 30, 1983, the 52nd Escort Corps was abolished and became a ship under the direct control of the 2nd Escort Corps. From June 28 to August 16 of the same year, she participated in the Hawaii dispatch training with the escort vessels JDS Hatsuyuki and JDS Tachikaze.

On March 30, 1984, she became the flagship of the 2nd Escort Group. She later participated in the Exercise RIMPAC 1984, and again in 1986.

From July 1 to 31, 1990, she participated in the maritime training (open sea practice voyage) toward Guam with the escort vessels JDS Asagiri, JDS Yamagiri and JDS Tachikaze.

From June 27 to August 28, 1991, she participated in the US dispatch training with the escort vessels JDS Asakaze and JDS Setogiri.

Kurama participated in Exercise RIMPAC events in 1992 and 1994.

From July 26 to 30, 1996, she visited Vladivostok, Russia, for the first time as a self-defense ship to participate in the 300th anniversary ceremony of the Russian Navy.

From July 24 to 29, 1998, she visited Vladivostok again with the escort ship JDS Yamagiri and JDS Hamana, and participated in the Russian Pacific Fleet Fleet Review Ceremony held on July 26. In addition, the first Japan-Russia joint training was held in the Sea of Japan east of Vladivostok on July 29 and 30, and participated in it.

From February 25 to March 31, 2000, she participated in the open sea practice voyage with JDS Yamagiri and JDS Asakaze. Later that year, she participated in Exercise RIMPAC 2000.

On November 9, 2001, she was dispatched to the Indian Ocean along with the escort ship JDS Kirisame and JDS Hamana for an information gathering mission based on the Act on Special Measures Against Terrorism. They returned to Japan on the 16th.

From May 16 to August 3, 2003, she participated in the US dispatch training with the escort vessels JDS Shimakaze and JDS Setogiri. After returning to Japan, remodeling work was carried out at Mitsubishi Heavy Industries Nagasaki Shipyard & Machinery Works, and the shooting command device for short SAM control changed from WM-25 to the domestically produced Type 81 shooting command device type 2-12 (FCS-2-12). It was replaced with the domestic GMLS-3, and the onboard missile was the RIM-7M. All of these are reprinted from those equipped on the escort ship JDS Takatsuki, which was removed from the register in August 2002. The construction was completed in April 2004.

From November 10 to 12, 2004, she dealt with the Han-class submarine in Japan's territorial sea with the escort ship JDS Yudachi.

On January 14, 2005, an integrated unit of land, sea, and air self-defense forces was formed based on the Japan Disaster Relief Team Dispatch Law to rescue the Sumatra Island Earthquake, and departed from Sasebo. Relief activities such as transportation of relief supplies were carried out together with the transport ship JDS Kunisaki and JDS Tokiwa.

From May 16 to August 1, 2007, she participated in the US dispatch training with the escort vessels JS Chokai and JS Inazuma.

On March 26, 2008, she was transferred to the 2nd Escort Group 2 Escort Corps due to the reorganization of the Escort Corps. She was transferred to Yokosuka.

She was dispatched to the Great East Japan Earthquake caused by the 2011 off the Pacific coast of Tohoku Earthquake on March 11, 2011. On October 19, the same year, she departed Yokosuka for training in the United States, stayed at Pearl Harbor in Hawaii from October 31 to November 21, and trained with US Navy vessels to improve their practical skills. She returned to Sasebo on December 5.

On 27 October 2009, JS Kurama collided with a South Korean container ship under the Kanmonkyo Bridge in the Kanmon Straits off the coast of Japan. While neither ship sunk, the bow of Kurama was badly damaged and burned for hours. Three Kurama crew members were reported injured.

On March 22, 2017, she was decommissioned due to the commissioning of the second Izumo-class helicopter destroyer JS Kaga. Her final affiliation is the 2nd Escort Group, 2nd Escort Corps. The home port has been Sasebo consistently for about 36 years since commissioning. In the SDF observing ceremony for 36 years, she served as a observing ship four times, with a total voyage time of 78,772 hours, a total number of landings of 51,300 times, and sailed 942,760.2 nautical miles (1,745,991.9 km), which is equivalent to about 43.6 laps of the earth. After retirement, a press release was released to make the new torpedo for submarines a real ship.

On June 12, 2018, the ship departed while being towed from Sasebo, and then disposed of by a new torpedo from a submarine of the Maritime Self-Defense Force off the coast of Wakasa Bay. Floating debris such as the inner fireboat and the outer shell of the turret have been recovered by the test ship JS Asuka in the sea area.

== Gallery ==
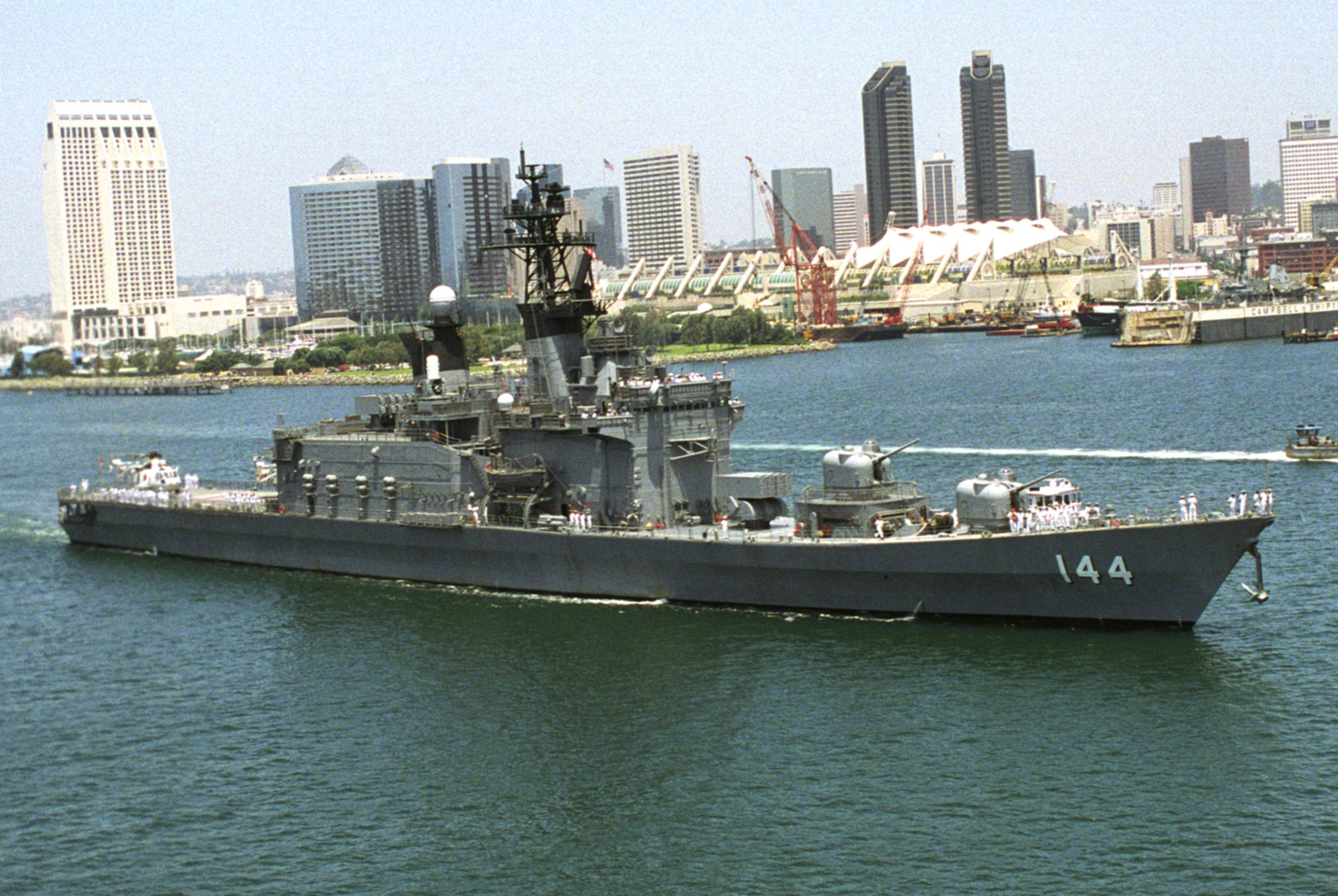
JDS Kurama at San Diego on 1 June 1992

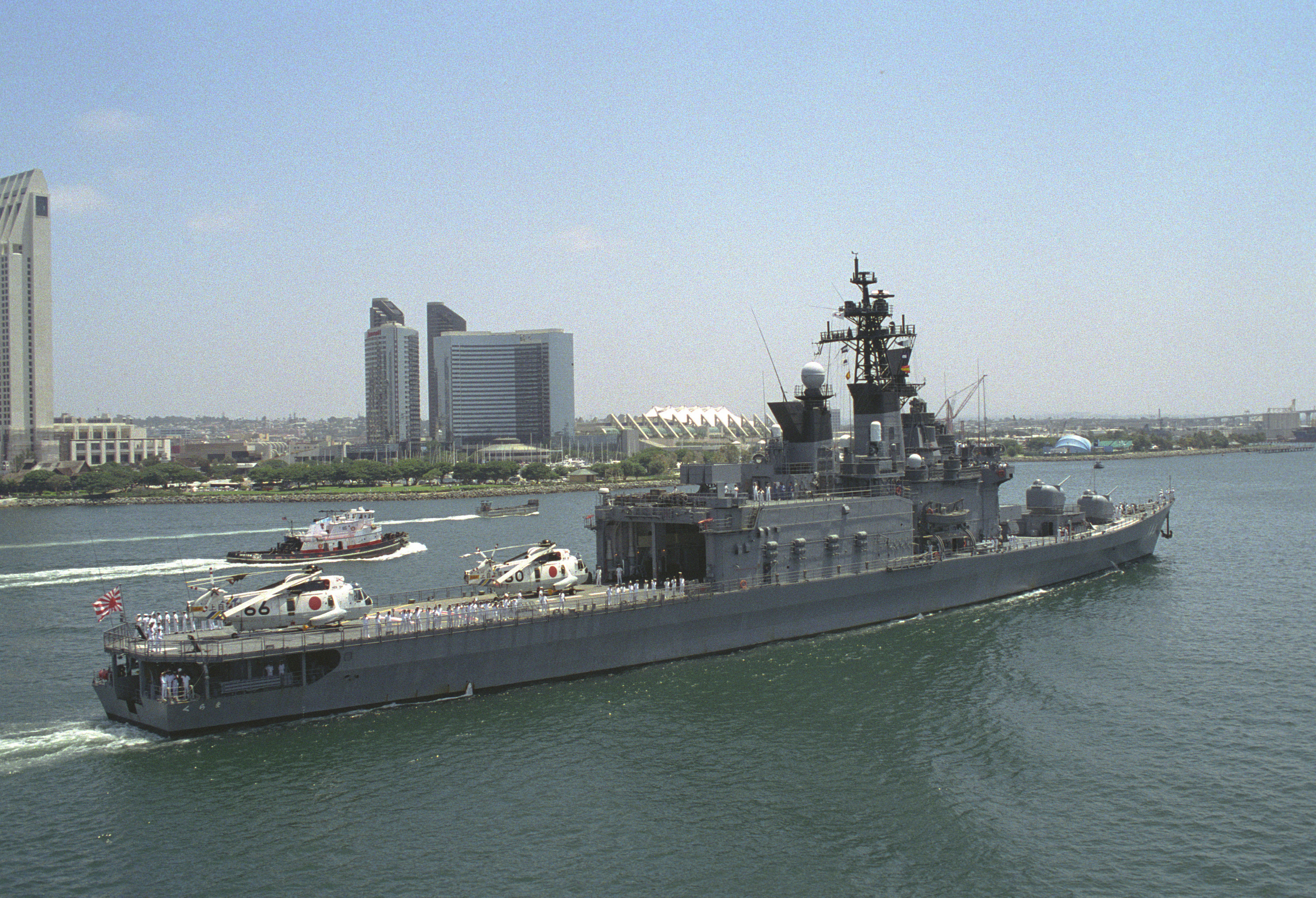

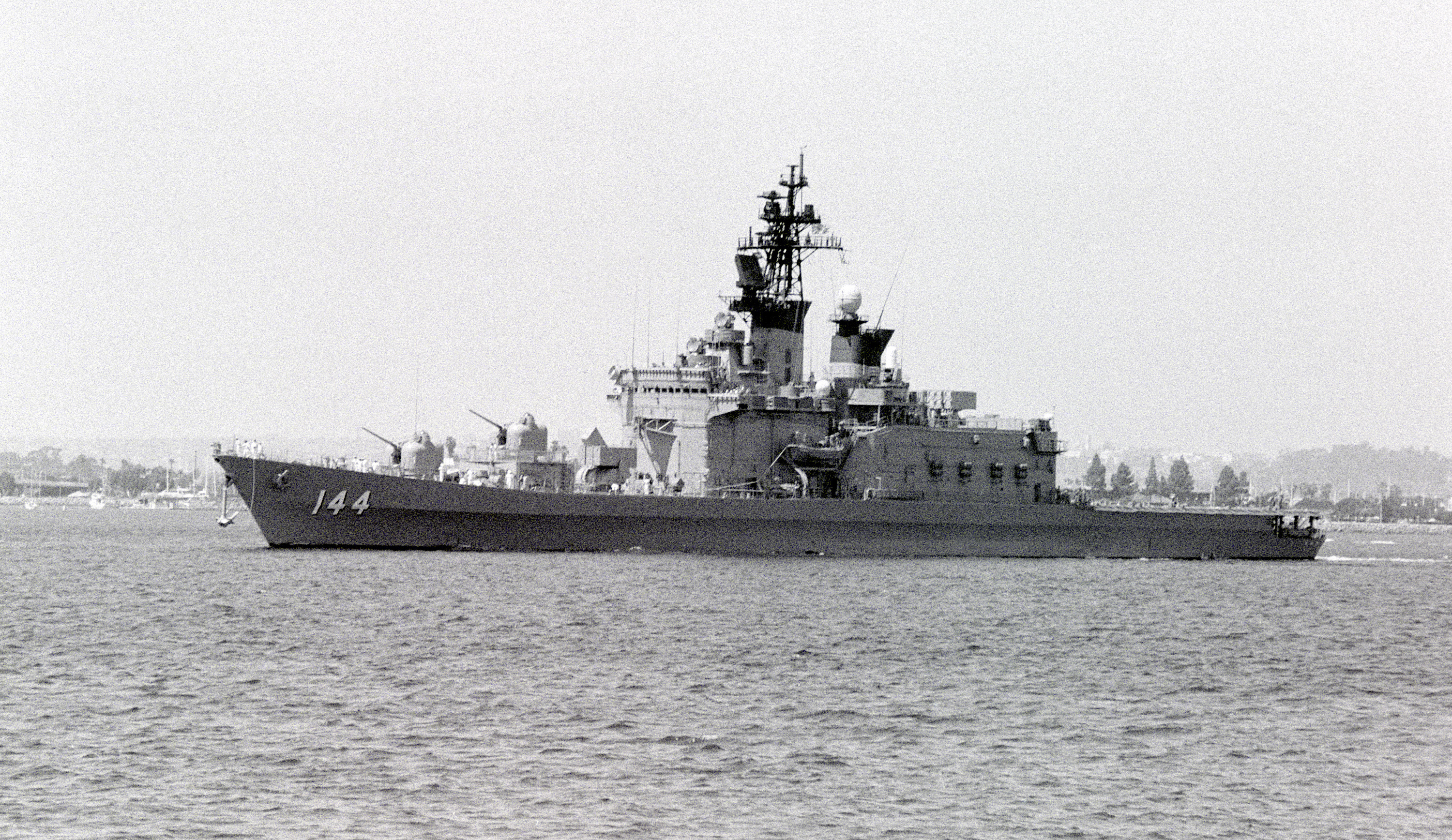
JDS Kurama in San Diego on 1 July 1994

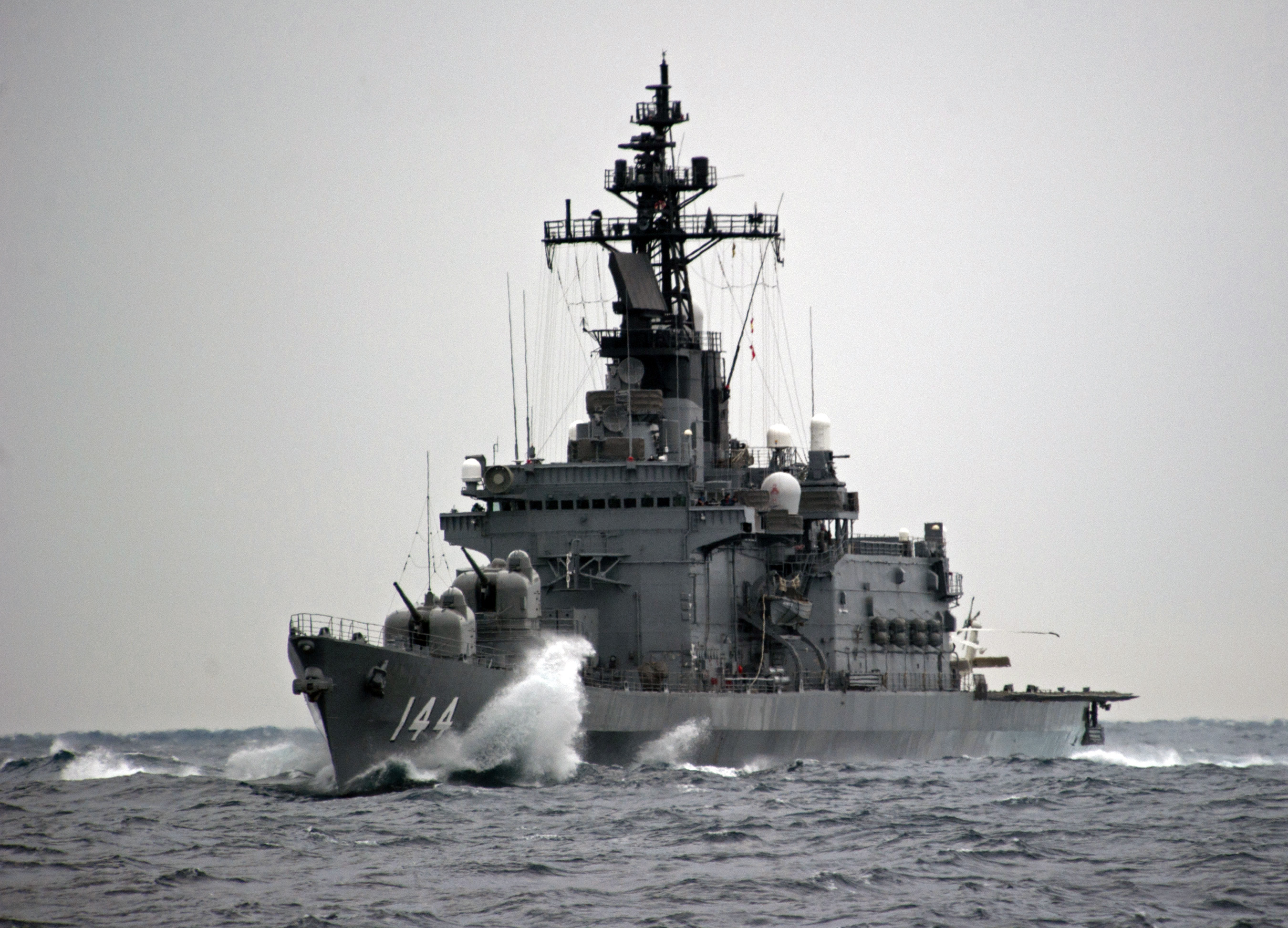
JS Kurama underway on 10 January 2011

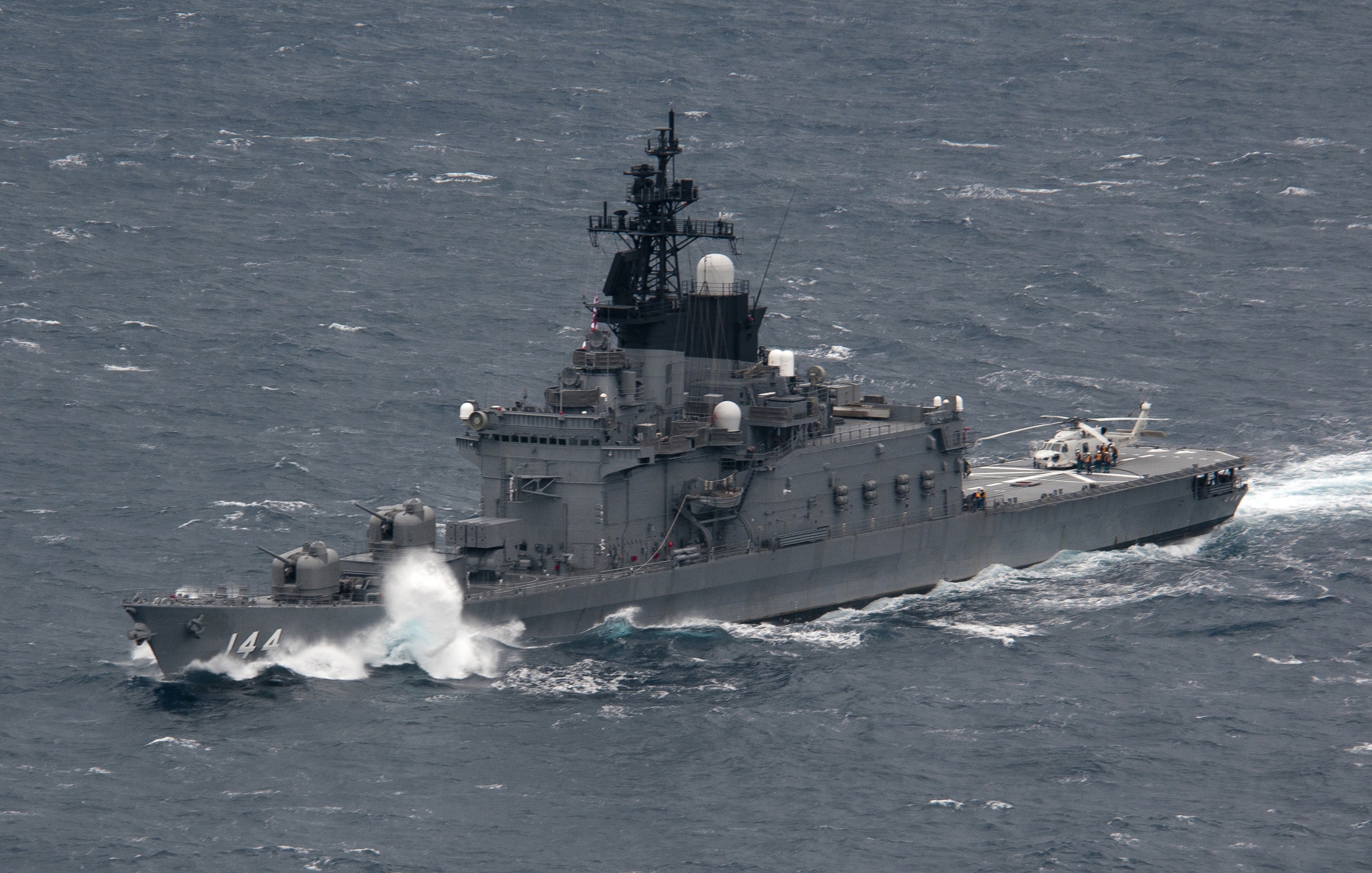

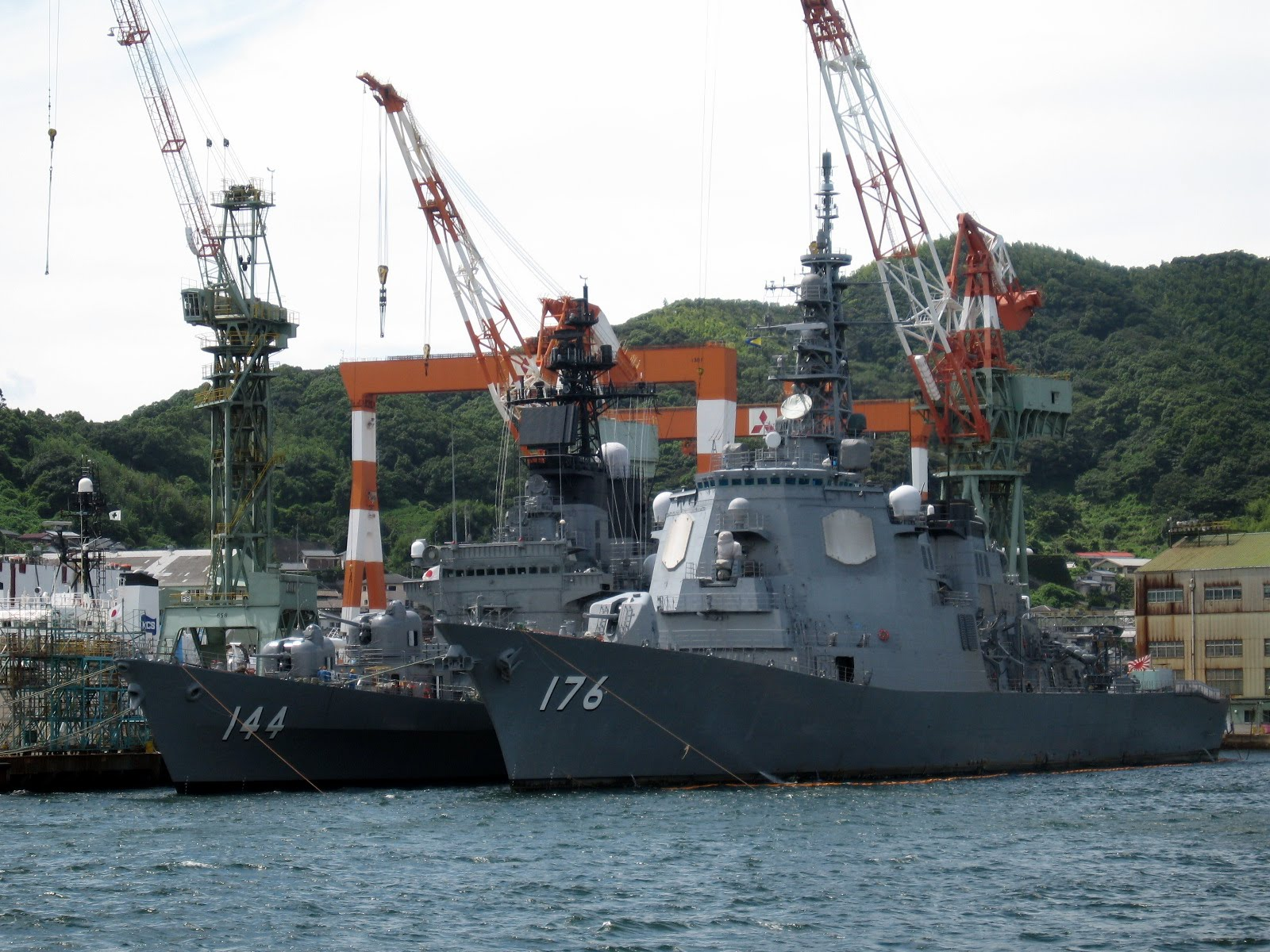
JS Kurama and JS Chōkai at Mitsubishi Shipyard on 2 September 2011

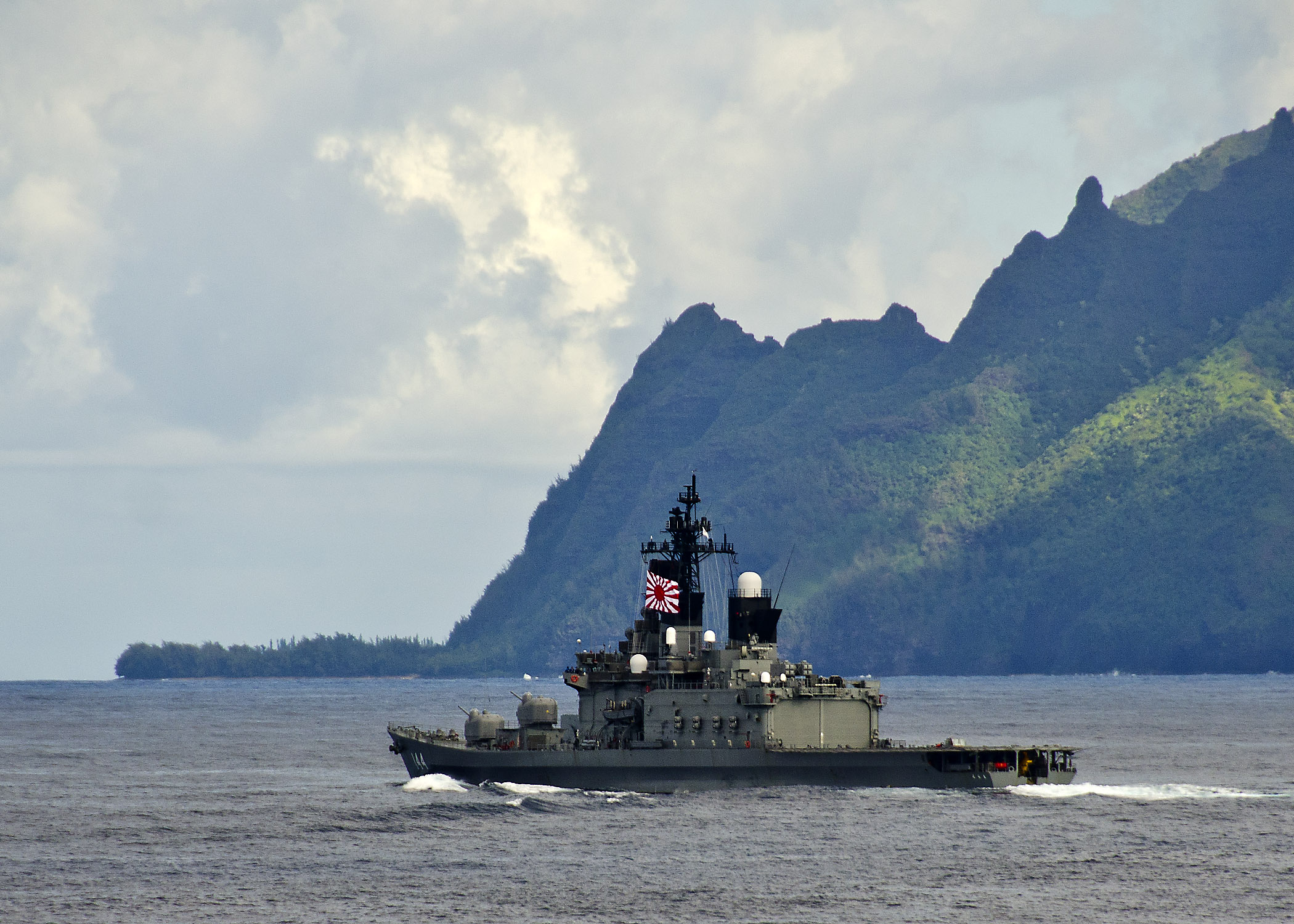
JS Kurama off Hawaii on 14 November 2011

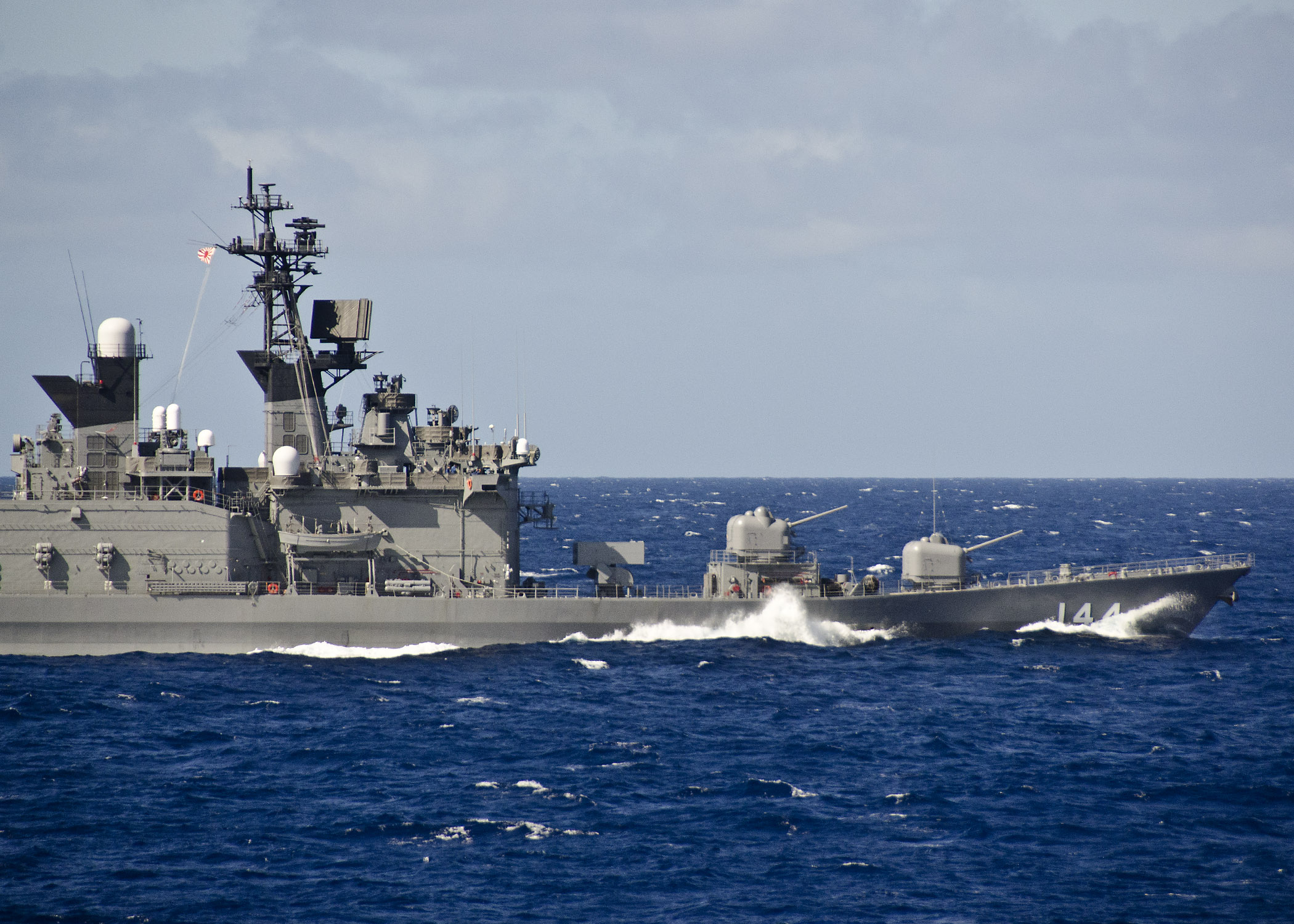
JS Kurama underway on 12 November 2011

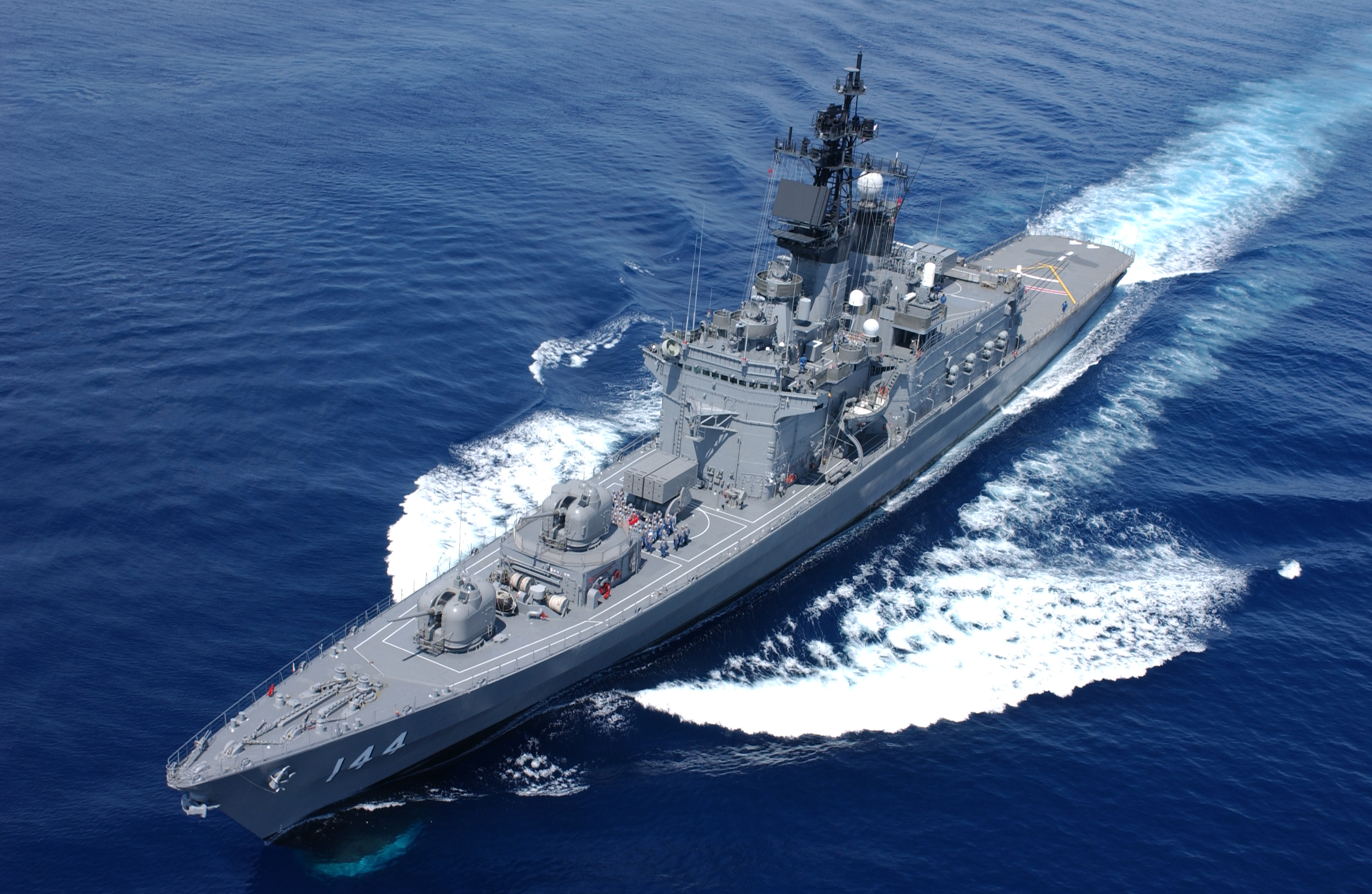
JS Kurama underway on 21 August 2013

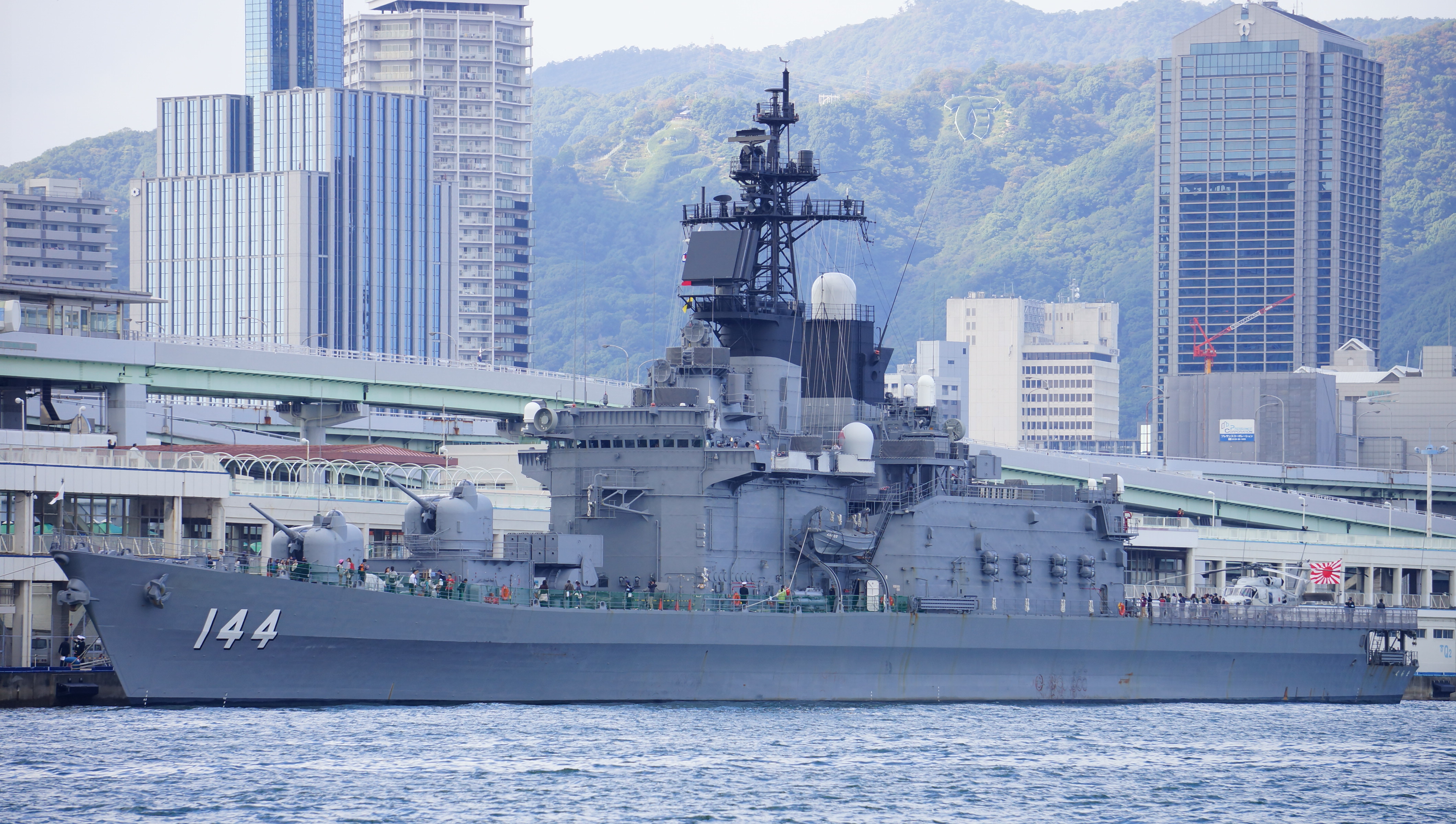
JS Kurama in Kobe on 27 October 2013
