= JS Chōkai =

Kongō-class guided missile destroyer

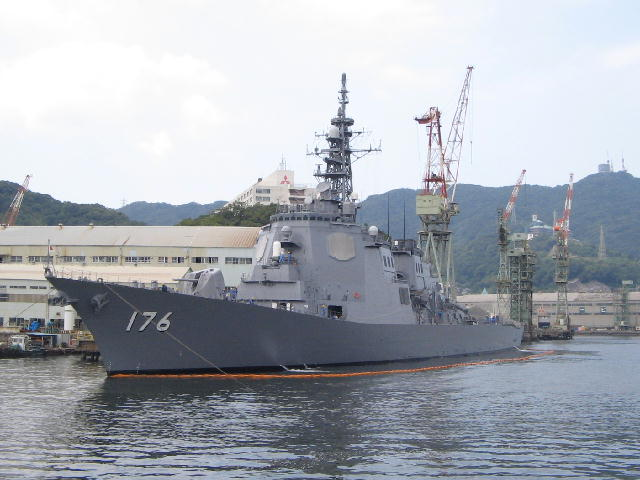
- JS Chōkai docked on 28 September 2005

History

Japan
- Name: Chōkai; (ちょうかい)
- Namesake: Mount Chōkai
- Ordered: 1993
- Builder: IHI Corporation
- Laid down: 29 May 1995
- Launched: 27 August 1996
- Commissioned: 20 March 1998
- Home port: Sasebo
- Identification: MMSI number: 431999629; Pennant number: DDG-176
- Status: Active

General characteristics
- Class & type: Kongō-class destroyer
- Displacement: 7500 tons standard; 9500 tons full load
- Length: 528.2 ft (161.0 m)
- Beam: 68.9 ft (21.0 m)
- Draft: 20.3 ft (6.2 m)
- Propulsion: 4 Ishikawajima Harima/General Electric LM2500-30 gas turbines; two shafts, 100,000 shaft horsepower (75 MW)
- Speed: 30 knots (56 km/h)
- Range: 4,500 nautical miles at 20 knots; (8,334 km at 37 km/h)
- Complement: 300
- Sensors & processing systems: AN/SPY-1D; OPS-28 surface search radar; OQS-102 bow mounted sonar
- Electronic warfare & decoys: NOLQ-2 intercept / jammer
- Armament: 1 × 127 mm (5 in)/54 Caliber Oto Melara Compact Gun; 8 × RGM-84 Harpoon Anti-ship Missile in quad canisters; 2 × 20 mm Phalanx CIWS; 2 × HOS-302 triple torpedo tubes: Mark 46 torpedo; Type 73 torpedoes; 90-cell Mk. 41 Vertical Launching System: SM-2MR Surface-to-air missile; SM-3 Anti-ballistic missile; RUM-139 Anti-Submarine Rocket; RIM-162 Surface-to-air missile
- Aircraft carried: 1 × SH-60K helicopter

JS Chōkai (DDG-176) is a Kongō-class guided missile destroyer in the Japan Maritime Self-Defense Force (JMSDF). Chōkai was named after Mount Chōkai. She was laid down by IHI Corporation in Tokyo on 29 May 1995 and was launched on 27 August 1996. Commissioning happened on March 20, 1998.

== Service ==
Following her commissioning in March 1998, she was dispatched to Hawaii for the Aegis System Equipment Qualification Test (SQT) until November 4, 1998

From May 16 to August 3, 2001, she participated in US dispatch training with the destroyers Hiei and Samidare.

Chōkai, along with the destroyer Ōnami and supply ship Hamana were assigned to the Indian Ocean in November 2004 to provide assistance to the Japanese Iraq Reconstruction and Support Group. She returned to Japan in March 2005.

From May 16 to August 1, 2007, she participated in US dispatch training with the destroyers Kurama and Inazuma.

From 9 September 2008 to December 8, 2008, she participated in ballistic missile defense tests for equipment certification, during which an interception from her RIM-161 Standard Missile 3 failed due to a malfunction of the warhead's orbit and attitude control system.

This ship was one of several in the JMSDF fleet participating in disaster relief after the 2011 Tōhoku earthquake and tsunami.

In 2012, Chōkai, along with Kongō and Myōkō were deployed in cooperation with the US Navy in preparation for the Democratic Republic of Korea to test the Kwangmyŏngsŏng-3 Unit 2. However, the ships were withdrawn after the satellite did not violate Japanese airspace.

From June 7 to August 23, 2016, she participated in the biannual Exercise RIMPAC, conducted in the sea and airspace around Hawaii and the United States West Coast, accompanied by the helicopter carrier Hyūga.

In 2019, Chōkai participated in the Malabar naval exercise. She represented the JMSDF along with the Kaga, Samidare and a Kawasaki P-1. During this exercise, she took part in combat training, anti-submarine warfare training, naval gunnery training, anti-aircraft training, as well as offshore supply training.

Later in 2019, between October 15 and 17, Chōkai, along with the destroyer Shimakaze took part in the Canadian and Japanese joint exercise known as KAEDEX19-2 near Yokosuka, working alongside HMCS Ottawa.

As of April 2020, Chōkai is based in Sasebo.

According to a press conference, Chōkai will be Tomahawk-missile capable by March 2026.

== Gallery ==
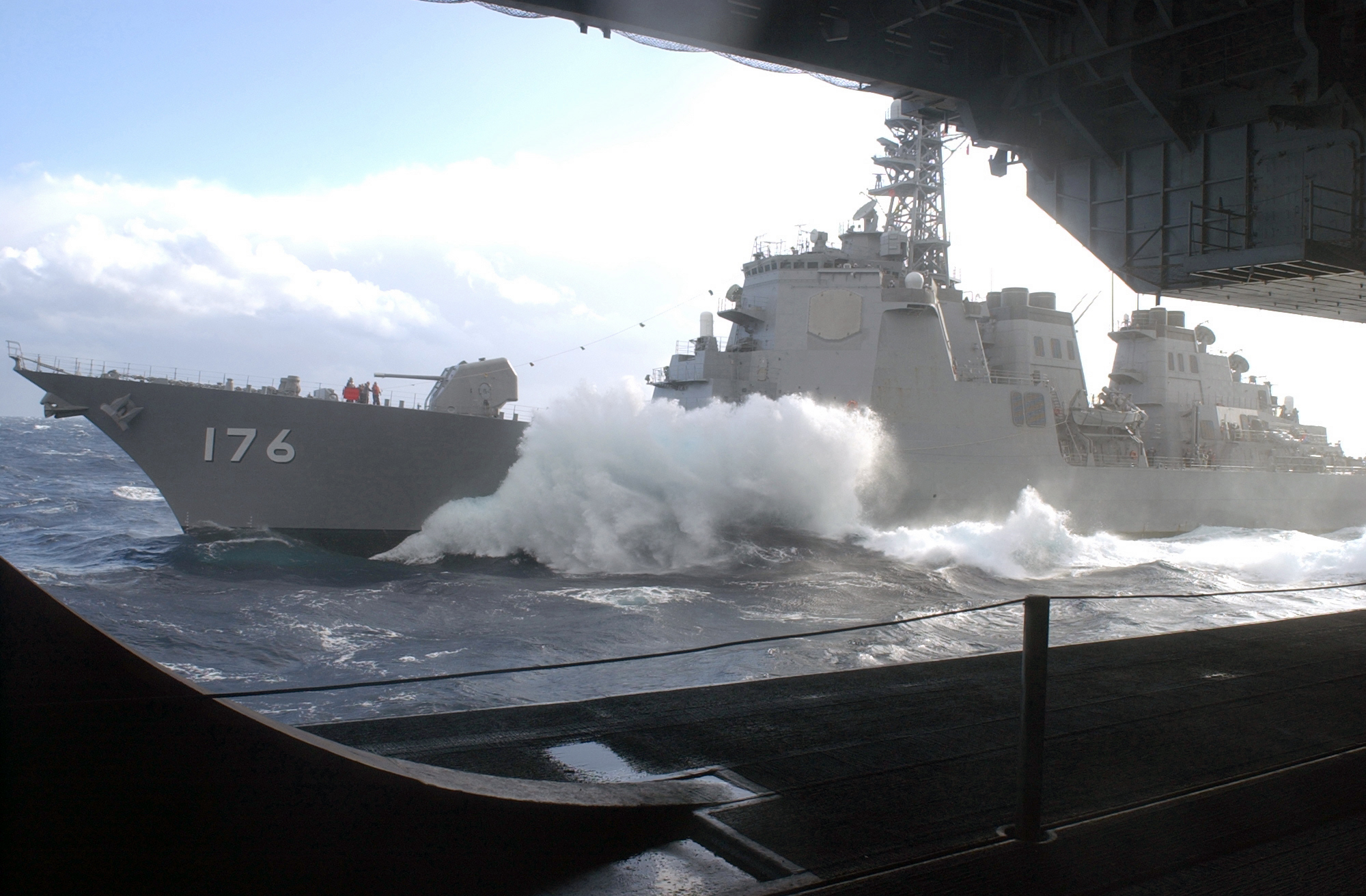
JS Chōkai alongside USS Kitty Hawk on 10 December 2002

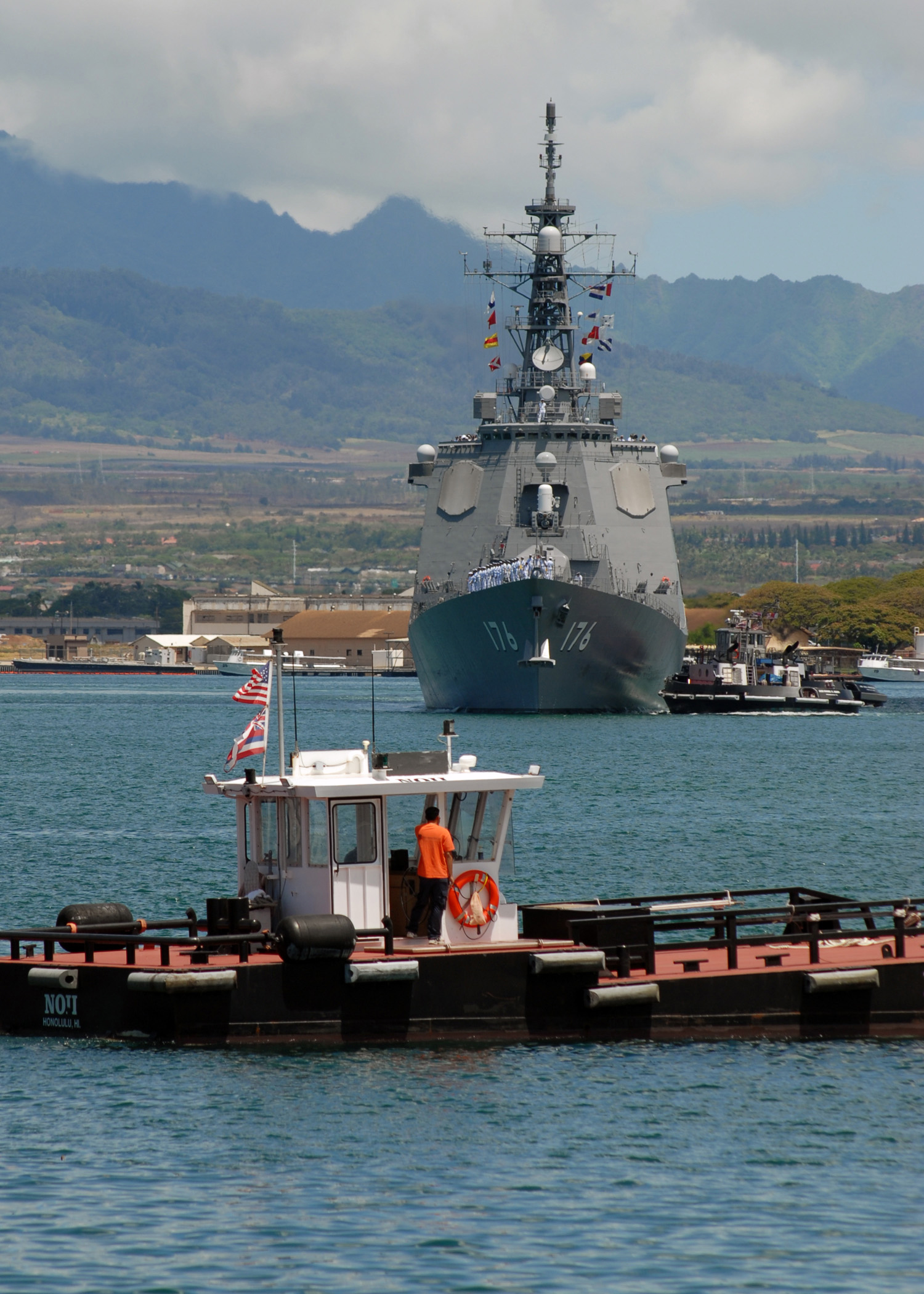
JS Chōkai at Pearl Harbor, 29 May 2007

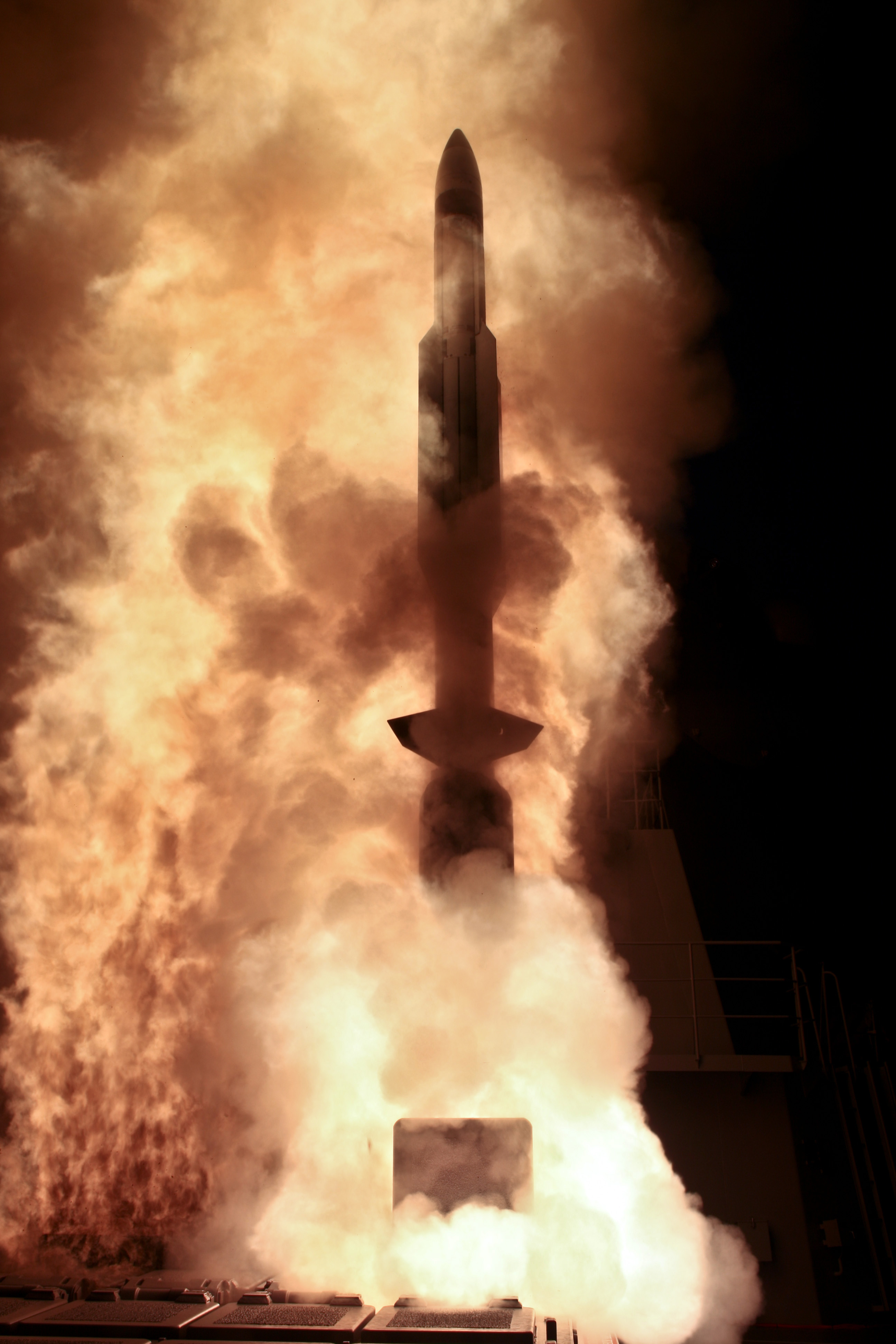
JS Chōkai launching a SM-3 on 19 November 2008

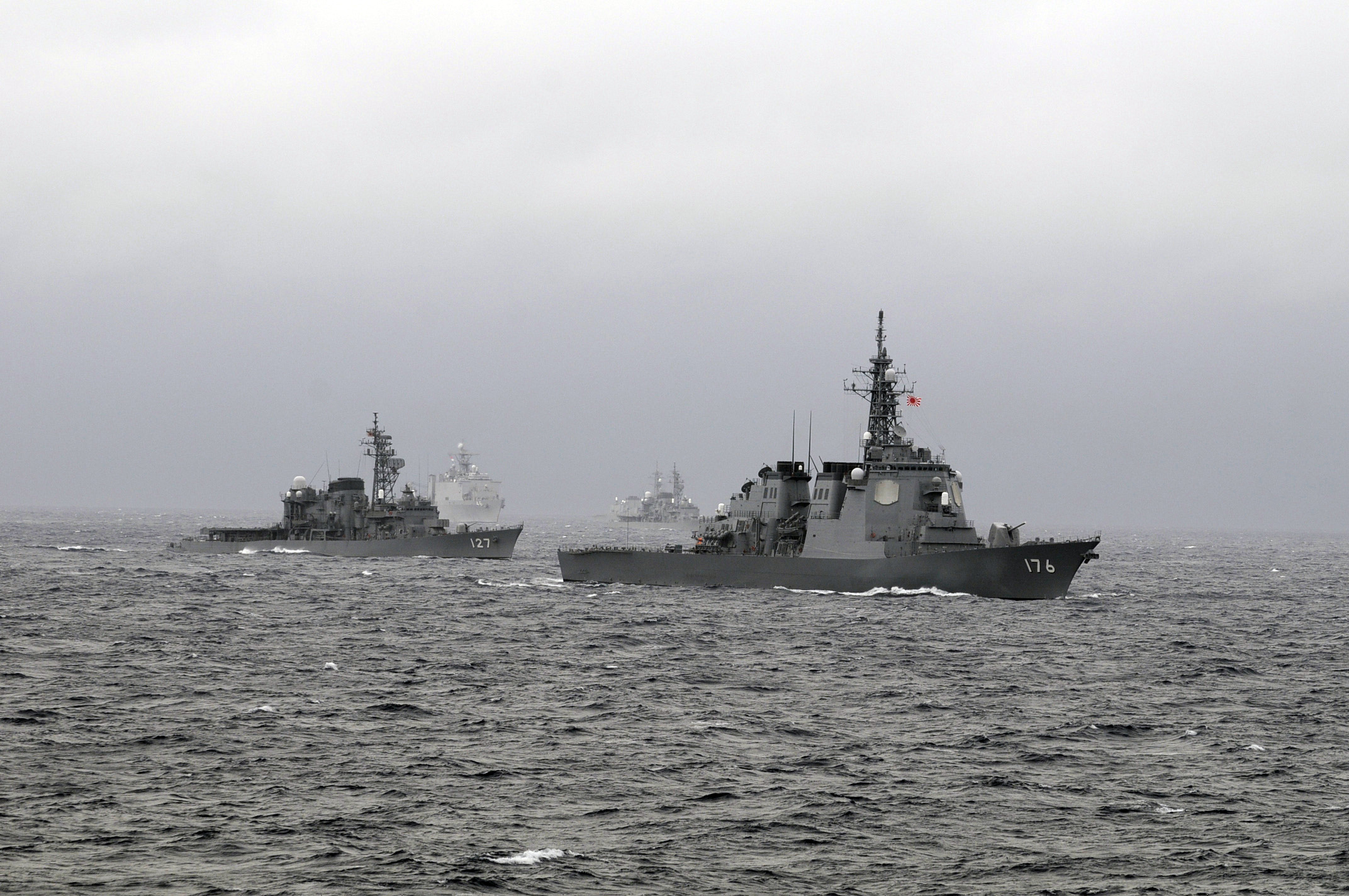
JS Chōkai, JS Isoyuki, JS Haruyuki, and USS Tortuga underway on 17 November 2009

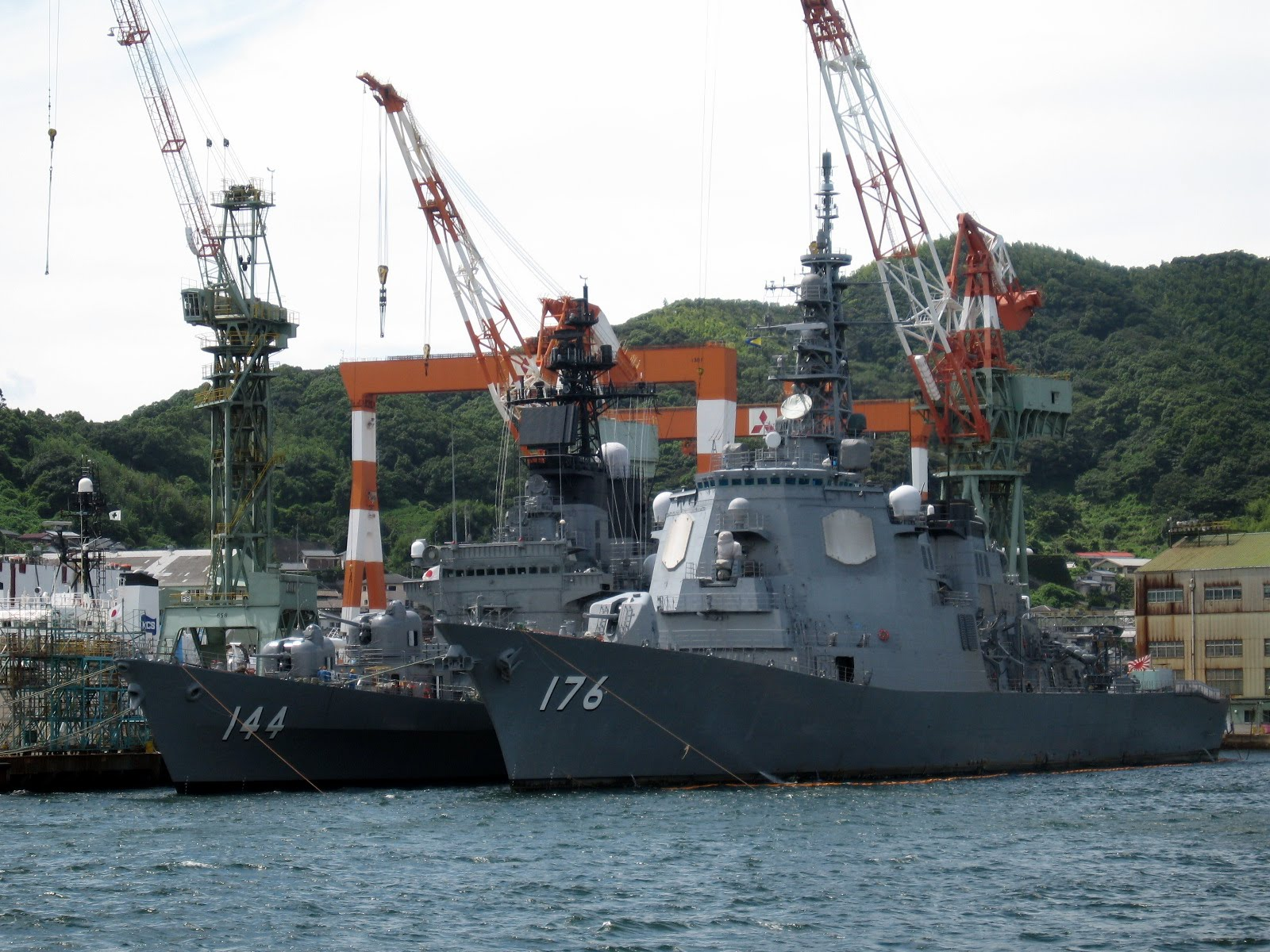
JS Chōkai and JS Kurama on 2 September 2011

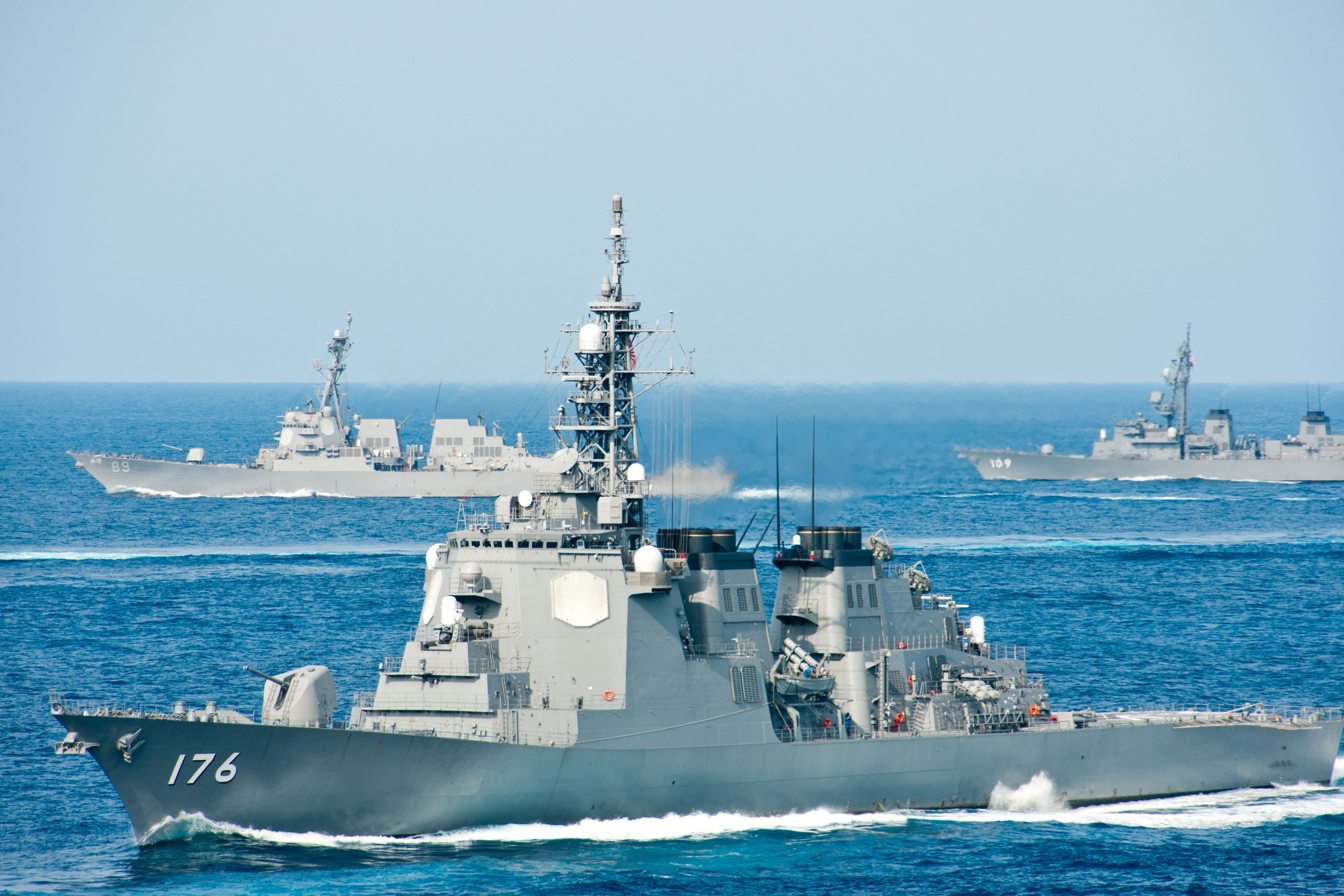
JS Chōkai with USS Mustin and JS Ariake on 16 November 2012

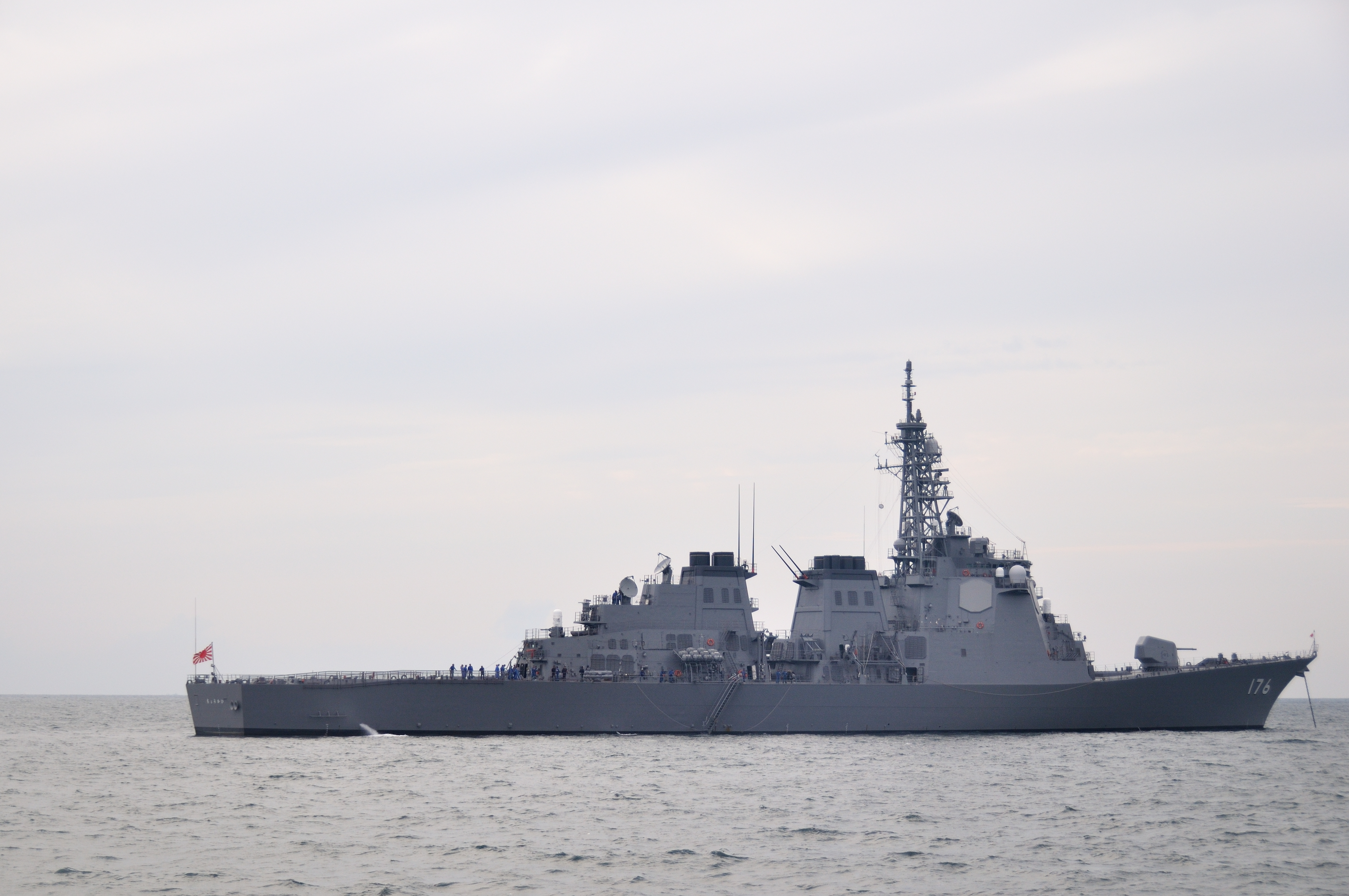
JS Chōkai underway on 26 August 2013

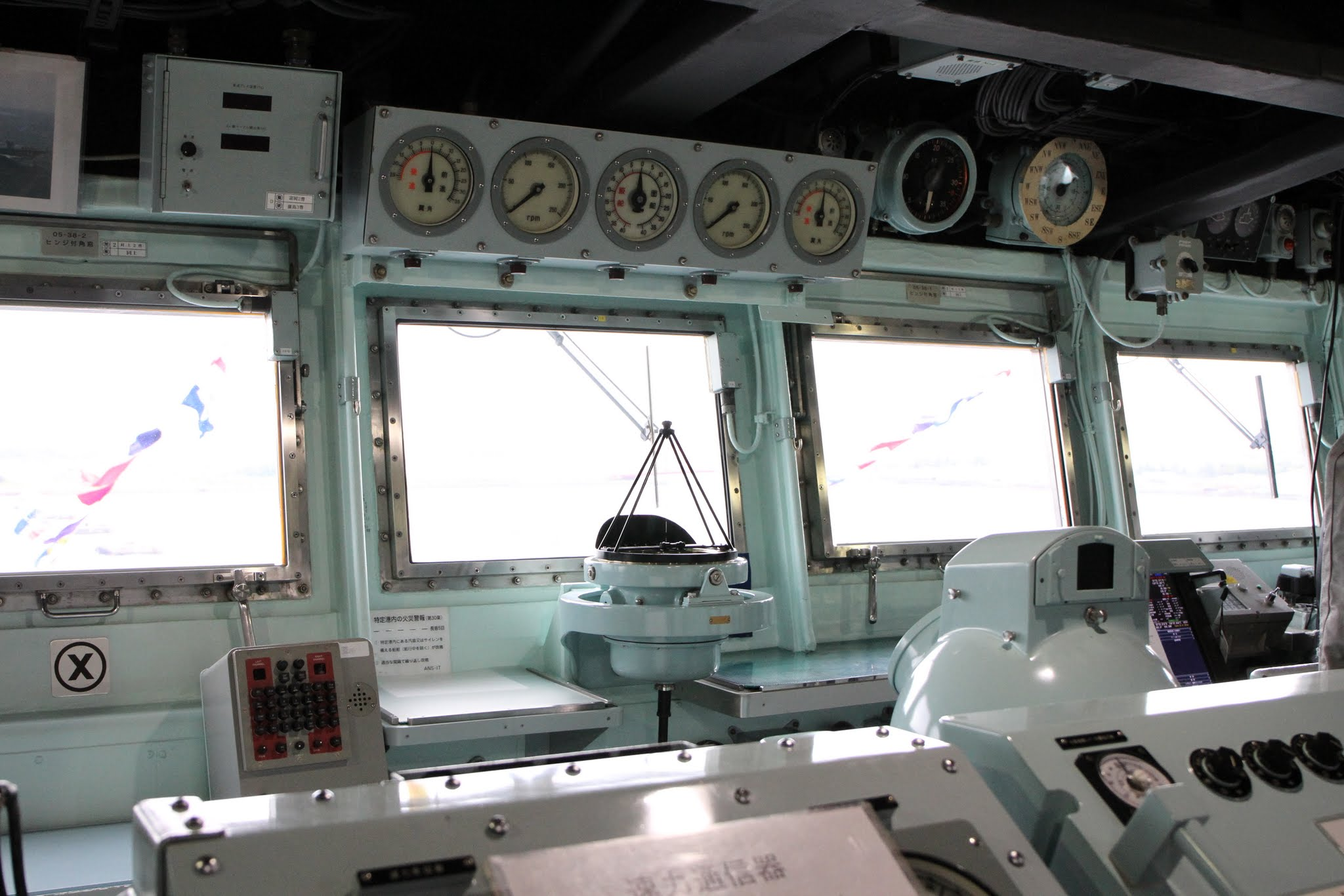
Bridge of JS Chōkai, 11 October 2015

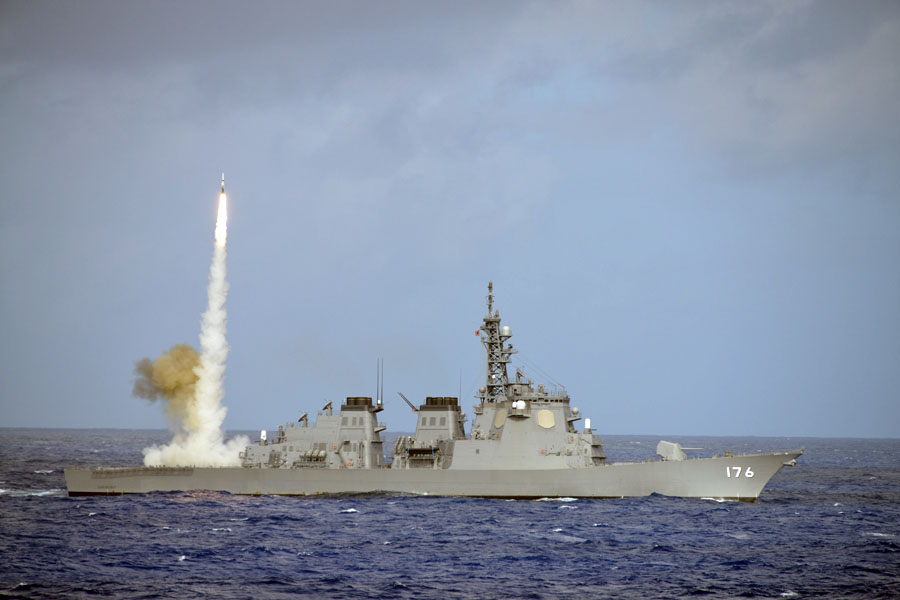
JS Chōkai launches missile as part of RIMPAC 2016

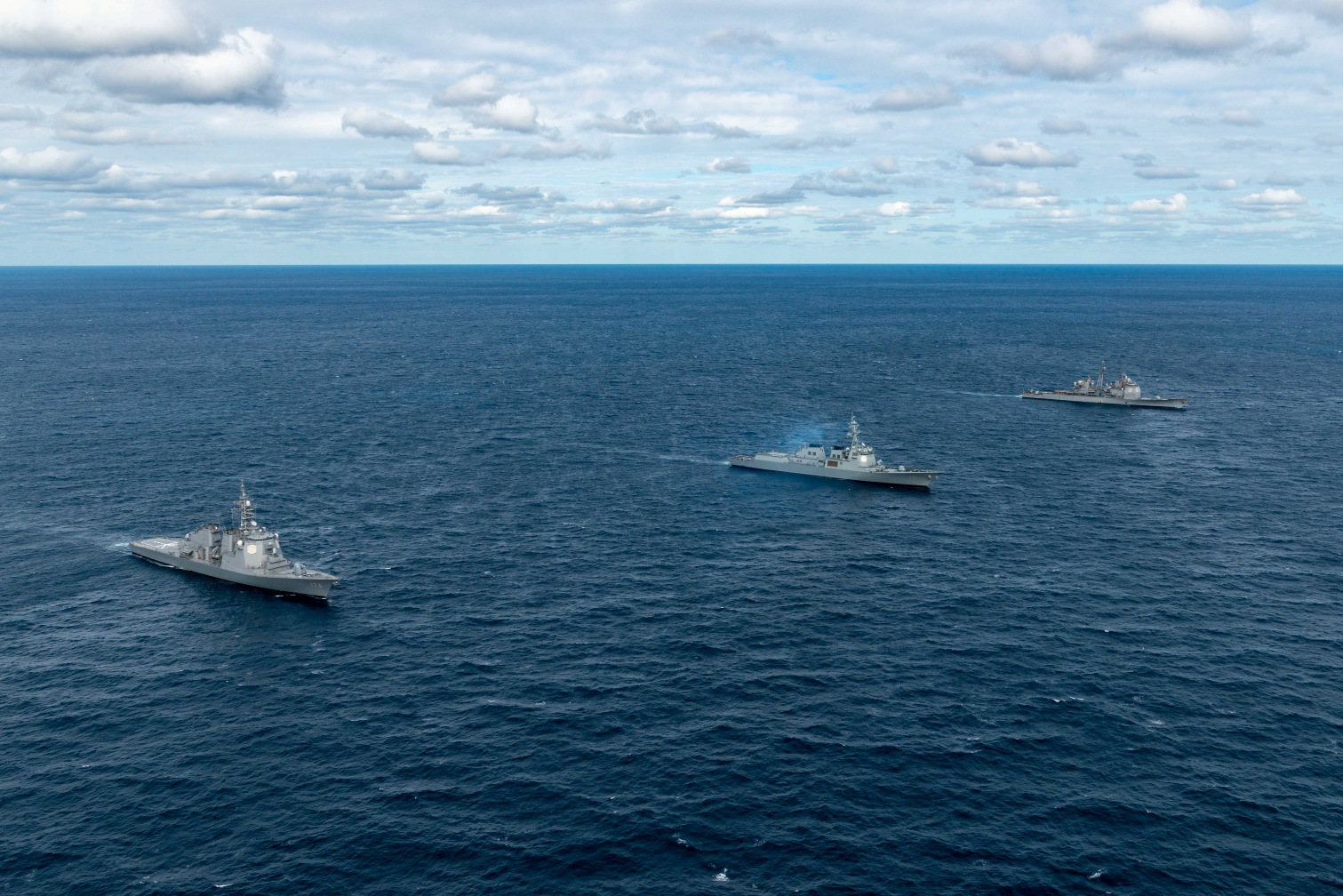
JS Chōkai with the American cruiser USS Chancellorsville and the South Korean destroyer ROKS Sejong the Great in the Sea of Japan, 6 October 2022
