= Japanese ship Kaga =

At least two warships of Japan have borne the name Kaga:

- Japanese aircraft carrier Kaga, an aircraft carrier of the Imperial Japanese Navy, named after the province.
- JS Kaga (CVM-184), a helicopter carrier of the Japan Maritime Self-Defense Force, named after the province.
