= Izumo-class destroyer =

Japanese helicopter carrier class

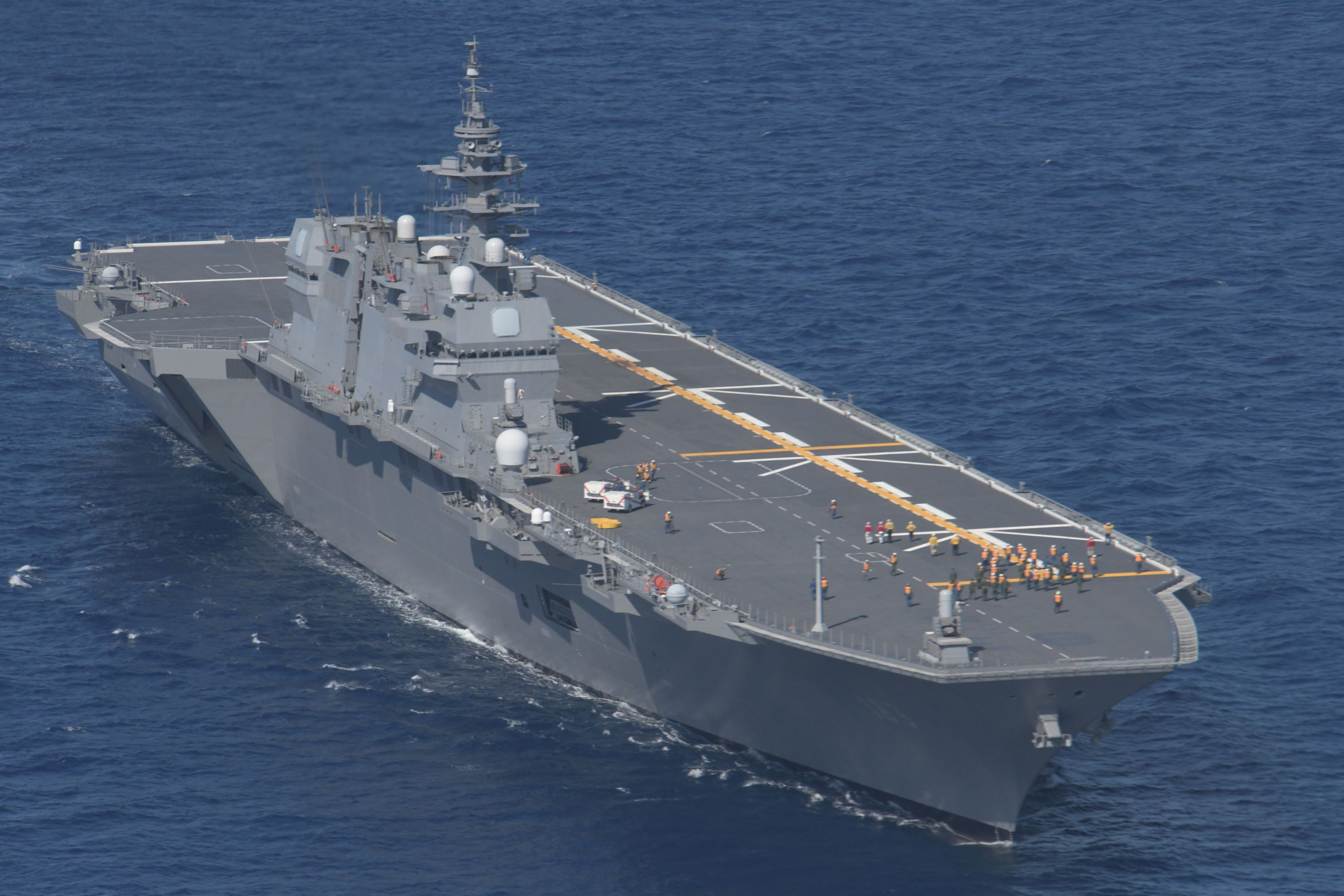
- JS Izumo (DDH-183)

Class overview
- Name: Izumo class
- Builders: Japan Marine United
- Operators: Japan Maritime Self-Defense Force
- Preceded by: Hyūga class
- Cost: 113.9 billion yen for construction of first unit
- Built: 2012–2017
- In commission: 2015–present
- Planned: 2
- Completed: 2
- Active: 2

General characteristics
- Type: Aircraft-carrying multi-role cruiser / Aircraft carrier (in near future); Helicopter-carrying destroyer / Helicopter carrier (current)
- Displacement: 19,500 tons standard; 26,000 tons full load
- Length: 248 m (813 ft 8 in)
- Beam: 38 m (124 ft 8 in)
- Draft: 7.5 m (24 ft 7 in)
- Depth: 23.5 m (77 ft 1 in)
- Installed power: 112,100 hp (83,600 kW)
- Propulsion: COGAG, two shafts; 4 × GE/IHI LM2500IEC gas turbine
- Speed: 30 knots (56 km/h; 35 mph)
- Complement: 520 including flag staff
- Sensors & processing systems: ATECS (advanced technology command system); OYQ-12 combat direction system; OPS-50 AESA radar; OPS-28 surface-search radar; OQQ-23 bow sonar
- Electronic warfare & decoys: NOLQ-3D-1 EW suite; Mark 36 SRBOC; Anti-torpedo mobile decoy (MOD); Floating acoustic jammer (FAJ)
- Armament: 2 × Phalanx CIWS; 2 × SeaRAM CIWS
- Aircraft carried: 7 ASW helicopters and 2 SAR helicopters; 12 or more F-35B; 28 aircraft V/STOL maximum

The Izumo-class destroyers (いずも型護衛艦, Izumo-gata-goei-kan) are multi-role destroyers in service with the Japan Maritime Self-Defense Force (JMSDF). The ships are de facto helicopter carriers and will serve as de facto aircraft carriers after the ongoing modifications. In 2025, the ships were formally reclassified as "aircraft-carrying multi-role escort ships" (CVM). The new designation will be adopted after the modification works are completed.

As of October 28, 2024, under a revised Ministry of Defense ordinance, it was indicated that the official classification of these ships may be changed from DDH (ヘリコプター搭載護衛艦 (herikoputā tōsai goei-kan, Helicopter carrying escort ship)) to CVM (航空機搭載多機能護衛艦 (kōkūki tōsai ta kinō goei-kan, Aircraft-carrying multi-role escort ship)). Previously, the Izumo-class vessels had been officially classified as DDH (helicopter-carrying destroyer), although some publications such as Jane's Fighting Ships had already referred to them more generally as "helicopter carriers". However, alongside the Aegis System Equipped Vessels, they are considered cruisers by the JMSDF.

The ships of this class are currently the largest surface combatants of the JMSDF, taking over the mantle previously held by the Hyūga-class helicopter destroyers. The lead ship was officially unveiled at Yokohama on 6 August 2013.

Both ships of the class are planned to operate STOVL Lockheed Martin F-35B Lightning II aircraft after modifications. The modifications have been controversial as some claim these ships seemingly violate Japan's post-World War II pacifist constitution, which restricts the country from possessing highly offensive weapons, such as "attack aircraft carriers". However, according to the Japanese government’s definition, "attack aircraft carriers" refer specifically to carriers designed solely for nuclear bombers to conduct nuclear strikes. Aircraft carriers equipped with conventional fighter jets or attack aircraft—whether they are small light carriers or large nuclear-powered carriers—are not considered illegal. Thus, Japanese and US officials have stated the vessels are not in violation, describing the vessels as defensive.

== Development ==
The Japanese Ministry of Defense (MOD) first announced plans for the class on 23 November 2009. This ship's primary mission is anti-submarine warfare (ASW) but peacekeeping and disaster relief operations are also being considered.

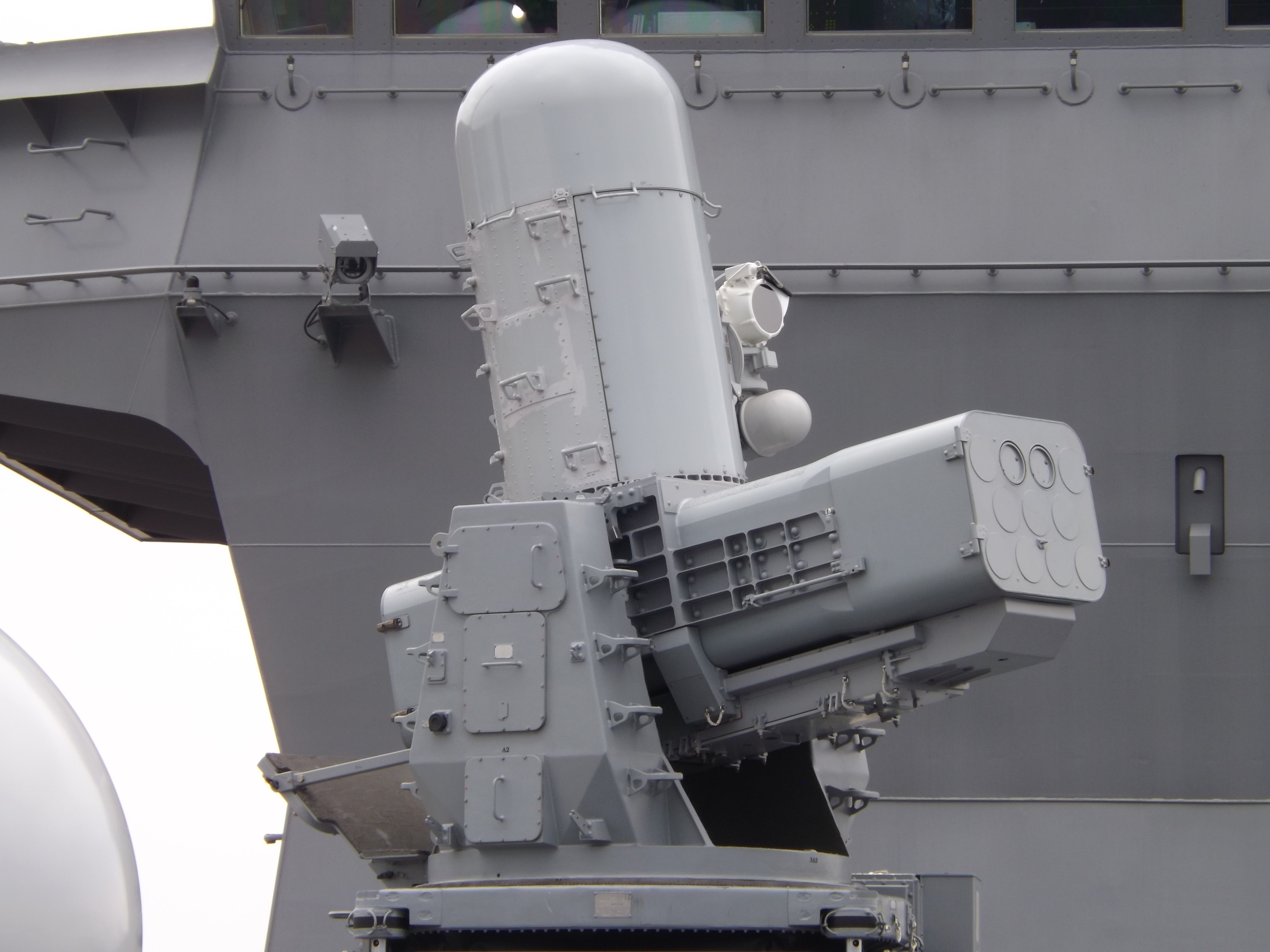
SeaRAM.

The ship carries up to 28 aircraft. However, only 7 ASW helicopters and 2 search and rescue (SAR) helicopters are planned for the initial aircraft complement. For other operations, 400 troops and 50 3.5 ton trucks (or equivalent equipment) can also be carried. The flight deck has 5 helicopter landing spots that allow simultaneous landings or take-offs. The ship is equipped with 2 Phalanx CIWS and 2 SeaRAM for its defense. The destroyers of this class were initially intended to replace the two ships of the Shirane class, which were originally scheduled to begin decommissioning in FY2014.

In 2010, Forecast International reported that some design features were intended to support fixed wing aircraft such as the Bell Boeing V-22 Osprey and Lockheed Martin F-35 Lightning II, although neither the MOD nor the JMSDF have mentioned the possibility of introducing carrier-based fixed-wing aircraft. The ship has neither a "ski-jump" nor a catapult, typical features for launching fixed-wing aircraft.

The construction of the first ship of the class began in 2011 at an IHI Marine United shipyard in Yokohama, with funding totalling 113.9 billion yen ($1.5 billion) being set aside in the fiscal 2010 budget for this purpose.

== Ships in the class ==
In September 2011, The Asahi Shimbun reported that the Ministry of Defense was to proceed with a budget request calling for funds for the construction of the planned second unit in the class. The request was approved and the construction contract was awarded to IHI Corporation in October 2012. This will come under the Defense Ministry's Mid-Term Defense Program FY2011-2015. The first ship in the class, Izumo was launched on 6 August 2013. The ship was commissioned on 25 March 2015.

Izumo was named after Izumo Province (出雲国, Izumo no kuni) (present-day Shimane Prefecture), and Kaga after Kaga Province (加賀国, Kaga no kuni) (present-day Ishikawa Prefecture).

Pennant no.	Name	Laid down	Launched	Commissioned	Homeport
DDH-183	Izumo	27 January 2012	6 August 2013	25 March 2015	Yokosuka, Kanagawa
DDH-184	Kaga	7 October 2013	27 August 2015	22 March 2017	Kure, Hiroshima

== Modifications to accommodate STOVL operations ==
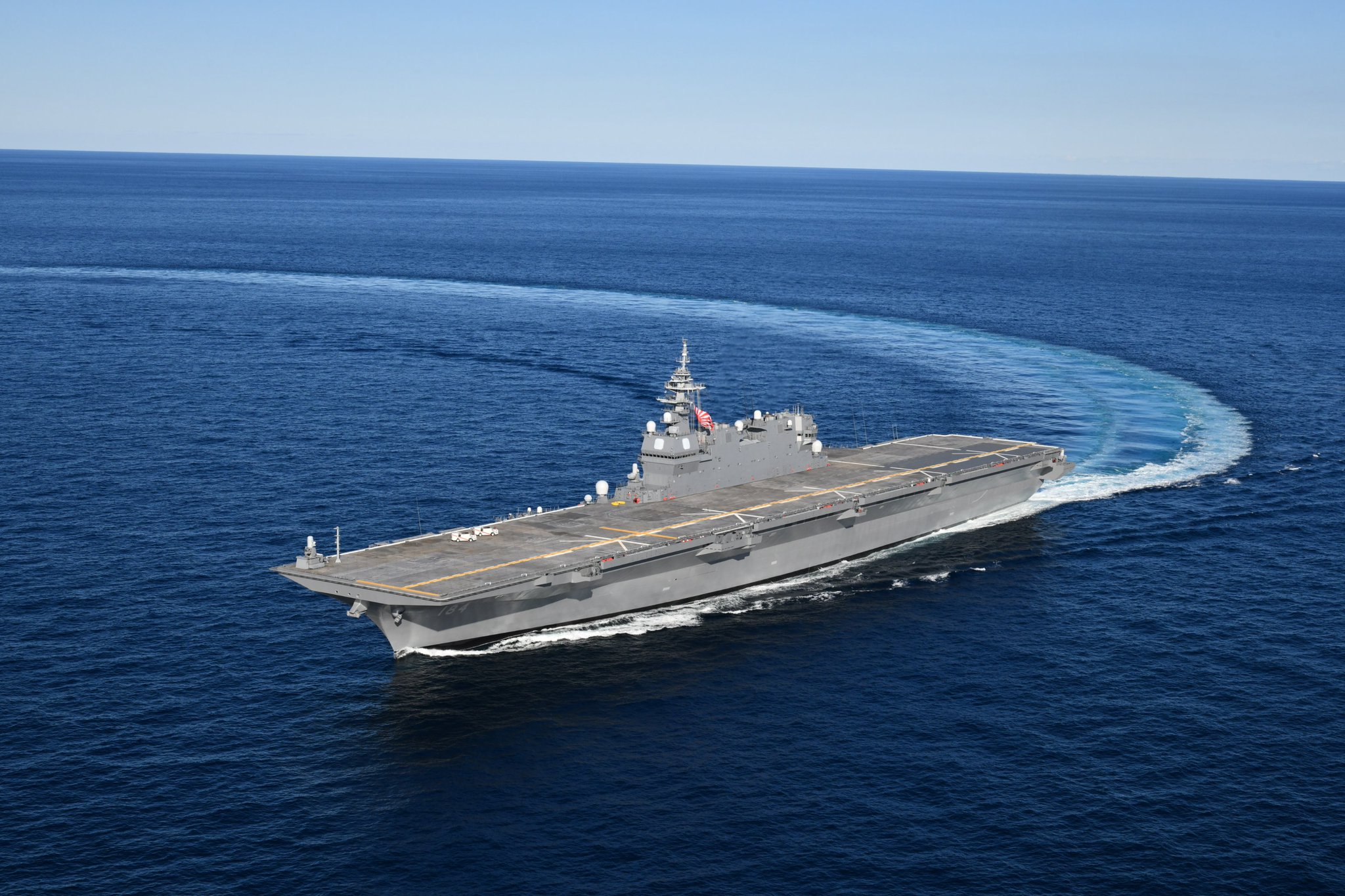
Kaga with modified bow

On 6 August 2013, JS Izumo was unveiled in Yokohama, south of Tokyo, Japan. Japanese officials claimed it would be used in national defense, specifically citing anti-submarine warfare and border-area surveillance missions. Additionally, it is asserted to bolster Japan's ability to transport personnel and supplies in response to large-scale disasters. This unveiling occurred at a time of heightened tensions over the Senkaku Islands.

The biggest warships in Japan's fleet since World War II, "raised eyebrows in China and elsewhere because it bears a strong resemblance to a conventional aircraft carrier" and has been described by the Chinese as an "aircraft-carrier in disguise." Though called a destroyer, provisions aboard the vessels indicated that the ships could be used in the future to launch fighter jets (F-35B) or other fixed wing VTOL aircraft.

Japanese military sources confirmed that the possibility of operating fixed wing aircraft was incorporated into the design of the ships from the earliest stages of the Izumo program, but this was not made public yet at that moment. The aircraft elevators and the deck paint were designed to handle aircraft like the F-35B, and it would be possible to add a ski-jump to the flight deck for STOVL operations.

In December 2017, several sources including Reuters and Yomiuri Shimbun reported that the Japanese government was contemplating modifying the Izumo class to operate F-35B STOVL aircraft. Multiple plans were reportedly under consideration, some of which call for US Marine Corps F-35s to use the vessels while others for Japan to procure its own aircraft. The plan quickly raised criticism from China, where government officials reacted negatively and urged Japan to "act cautiously".

Later, in February 2018, the Yomiuri Shimbun reported that Japan was planning to acquire 40 F-35Bs, the Short Take-off and Vertical Landing (STOVL) variant of the Lockheed Martin Lightning II Joint Strike Fighter (JSF), which could be operated from the Izumo class with some modifications to the ships. It was estimated that each Izumo-class carrier could operate 12 or more F-35B aircraft. In March that same year, the ruling Liberal Democratic Party called upon the Japanese government to develop its own aircraft carriers and operate F-35B aircraft, which has been thought to include refitting the Izumo class. Defense Minister Takeshi Iwaya announced on 27 November 2018 that Japan is considering buying F-35Bs within an order for an additional 100 F-35 aircraft, and as a consequence modifying both Izumo-class helicopter carriers to operate F-35B were also considered.

=== Approval of conversion ===
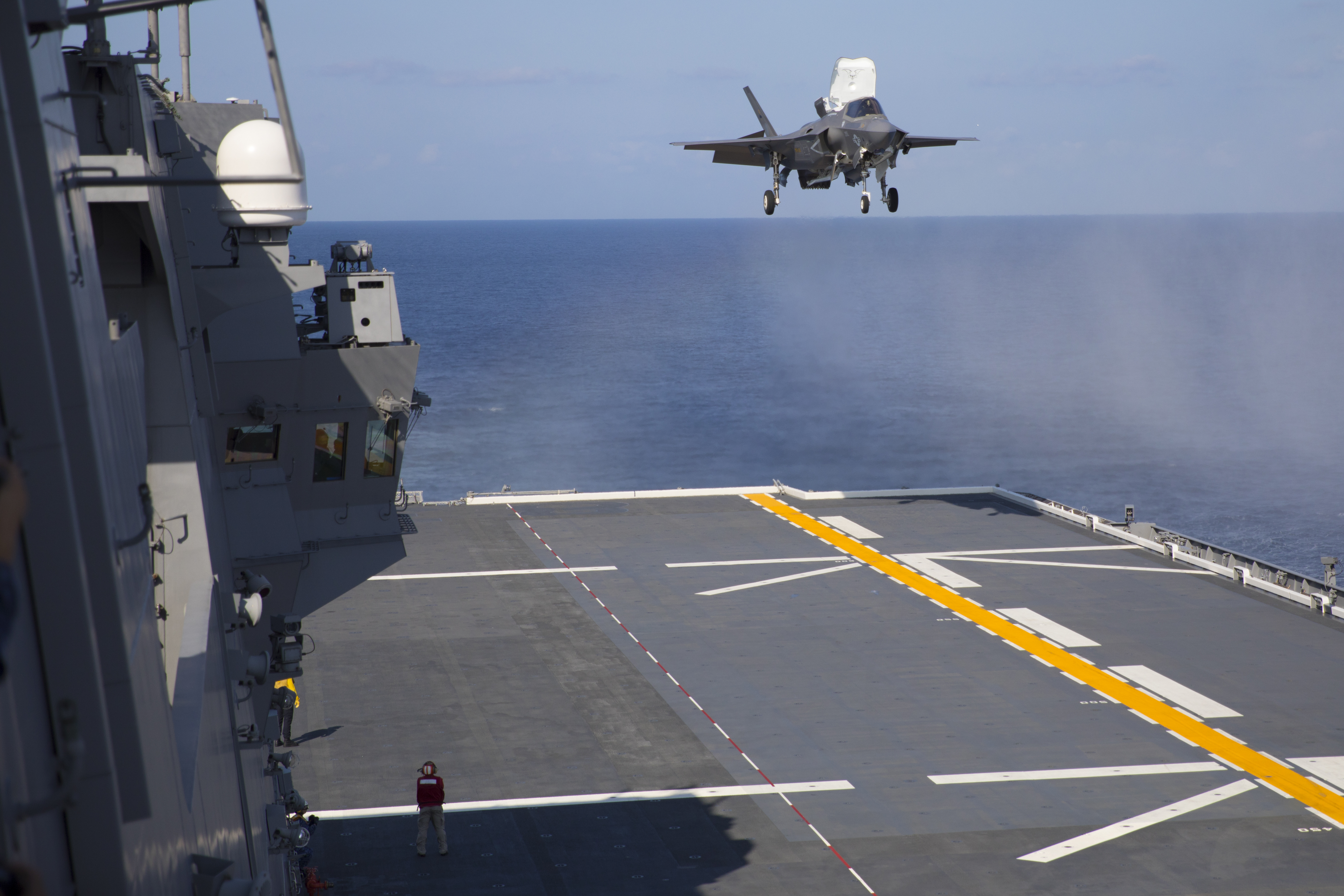
On 3 October 2021, the first F-35Bs performed landings and take-offs from JS Izumo

On 18 December 2018, the Japanese Cabinet gave approval to modify the Izumo class into de facto aircraft carriers. The modifications will reinforce the decks of the Izumo-class ships to support the additional weight of F-35B, as well as the heat and forces from the jets during vertical landing. Each vessel will also have the bow section of its flight deck, which is currently trapezoidal, modified into a square shape. The ruling parties re-designated the Izumo-class ships to multi-purpose operation destroyers. On 30 December 2019, Japanese Ministry of Defense approved the FY2020 budget that would finance the refurbishment of the Izumo class for F-35B operation.

The United States Marine Corps plans to operate their own STOVL F-35s from Izumo-class ships in cooperation with the ship's crew to build up a Japanese capability to operate this type of aircraft. The Japan Air Self-Defense Force has ordered 42 STOVL F-35Bs in 2019 and will operate them from land bases once delivered. In July 2021 it was indicated that of the 42 F-35B variants to be acquired, 18 will be introduced by FY2023, six in FY2024 and two in FY2025. These are to form a single squadron consisting of about 20 aircraft operating from the Nyutabaru Air Base in Miyazaki Prefecture in southwestern Japan. The base is located in close proximity to the JMSDF's Kure Base in Hiroshima Prefecture, which is the home port of JS Kaga.

The Asahi Shimbun quotes Japan's Defense Minister Takeshi Iwaya "The Izumo-class aircraft carrier role is to strengthen the air defense in the Pacific Ocean and to ensure the safety of the Self-Defense Force pilots." He also states, "there may be no runway available for the US aircraft in an emergency. I cannot say that the US F-35B should never be placed on an [JMSDF] escort vessel."

In 2020, Izumo began the conversion process. Initial modifications include strengthening the heat resistance of the deck and installing power supply equipment to enable the departure and arrival of the F-35B. A second renovation, to change the bow shape to a quadrangle for the safe operation of the F-35B the maintenance of the interior compartments, is scheduled to be carried out starting from the end of 2024 and be completed by the end of Fiscal Year 2026.

Kaga began her initial modifications in March 2022 at the Japan Marine United (JMU) shipyard in Kure, Hiroshima Prefecture. The proposed modification of Kaga will be more extensive (and significantly more expensive) and includes changes to the shape of the bow. The initial modification of Kaga was completed in early 2024 and is to be followed by a second modification of the ship’s interior, which is expected to begin in late 2026 and be completed by the end of Fiscal Year 2027.

On 3 October 2021, two USMC F-35Bs performed the first vertical landings and horizontal take-offs from JS Izumo, marking the first time in more than 75 years that a fixed-wing aircraft operated from a Japanese carrier.

On 13 September 2023, Kaga began a test voyage following modifications to her flight deck in preparation for aircraft operations. Her bow now has a conventional rectangular shape, and deck markings for aircraft takeoffs and landings had been painted.

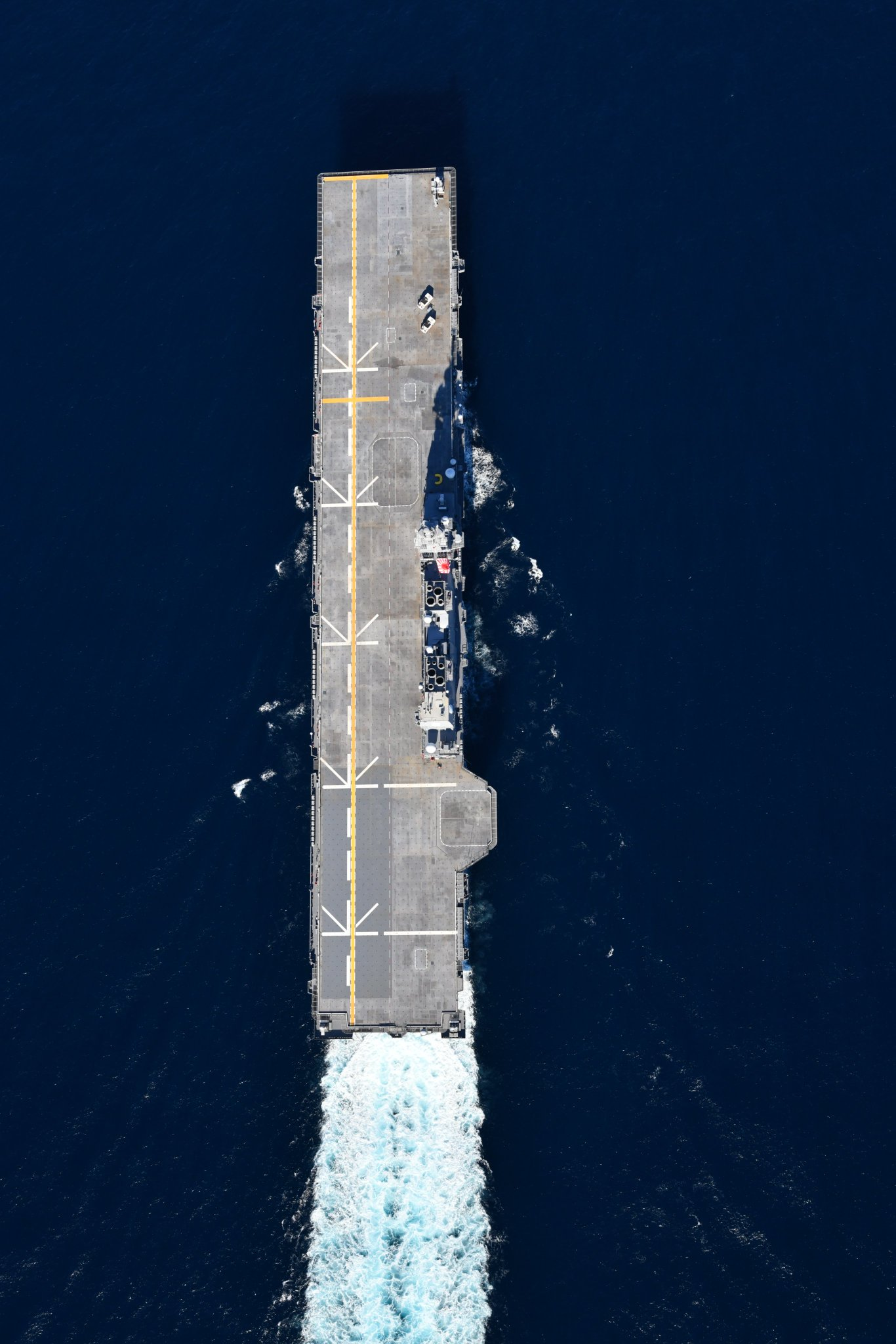
A view of renovated Kaga

== See also ==
- Sea Control Ship
- Cavour aircraft carrier
