= JS Kaga =

Japanese aircraft (helicopter) carrier

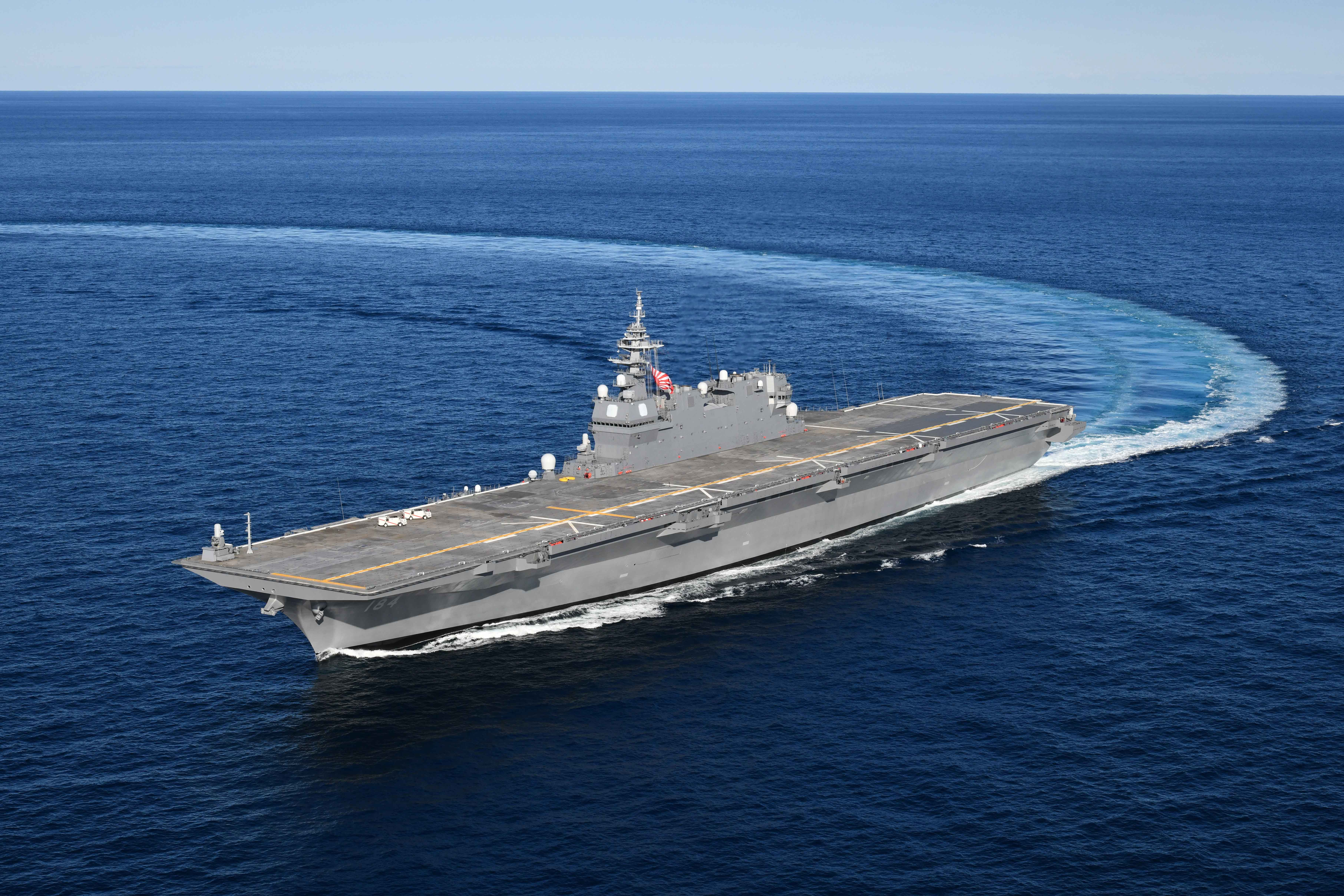
- JS Kaga (DDH/CVM-184)

History

Japan
- Name: Kaga; (かが)
- Namesake: Kaga Province
- Ordered: 2010
- Cost: US$1.05 billion
- Laid down: 7 October 2013
- Launched: 27 August 2015
- Commissioned: 22 March 2017
- Identification: Hull number: DDH/CVM-184; MMSI number: 431999555; Callsign: JSTE
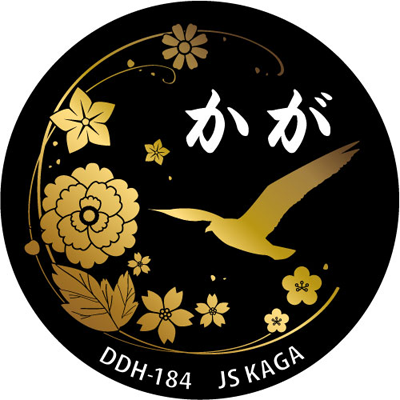
- Badge

General characteristics
- Class & type: Izumo-class aircraft-carrying multi-role cruiser
- Displacement: 19,500 long tons (19,800 t) empty; 27,000 long tons (27,000 t) full load
- Length: 248 m (814 ft)
- Beam: 38 m (125 ft)
- Draft: 7.5 m (25 ft)
- Propulsion: COGAG, two shafts; 4 × GE/IHI LM2500IEC gas turbine
- Speed: more than 30 knots (56 km/h; 35 mph)
- Sensors & processing systems: OYQ-12 combat direction system; FCS-3 fire control system; OPS-50 AESA radar; OPS-28 surface-search radar; OQQ-23 bow sonar
- Electronic warfare & decoys: NOLQ-3D-1 EW suite; Mark 36 SRBOC; Anti-torpedo mobile decoy (MOD); Floating acoustic jammer (FAJ)
- Armament: 2 × Phalanx CIWS; 2 × SeaRAM CIWS
- Aircraft carried: 7 ASW helicopters and 2 SAR helicopters; or 12-14 F-35B; 28 aircraft maximum

JS Kaga (DDH-184) is an aircraft-carrying multi-role cruiser of the Japan Maritime Self-Defense Force (JMSDF), which was previously classified as a multi-purpose operation destroyer. She is currently undergoing conversion, which is scheduled to be complete around fiscal year 2027. She is the second ship in the Izumo class, the other being JS Izumo. Her namesake arises from Kaga Province (加賀国, Kaga no kuni) in present-day Ishikawa Prefecture.

The modern-day Kaga shares its name with a WWII-era aircraft carrier when transcribed into English, but unlike her WWII-era predecessor, whose name was written in kanji (加賀), the new Kaga is written in hiragana (かが). She is also slightly longer than her World War II predecessor. Kaga and Izumo are the first aircraft carriers built by Japan since the end of World War II. Kaga was built as part of a wider Japanese military buildup, triggered by heightened Sino-Japanese tensions regarding the contested ownership of the Senkaku Islands.

As of 2024, the first stage to convert Kaga into a fixed-wing carrier capable of operating VTOL aircraft such as the F-35B has been completed.

== Construction ==
Kaga was intended to replace the aging Shirane-class destroyer Kurama, based on the schedule outlined within the 23 Mid-term Defence Capability Maintenance Plan to construct a 19,500-ton helicopter destroyer. Construction began at the Yokohama plant of Japan Marine United on 7 October 2013, and the ship was launched on 27 August 2015, with the commissioning on 22 March 2017. Construction of the ship before the aircraft carrier conversion cost ¥115 billion (US$726.4 million).

== Characteristics ==
The ship can host up to twenty-eight aircraft, or 14 helicopters. Japanese nomenclature called Kaga a "multi-purpose operation destroyer" and its main purpose in the past was destroying enemy submarines. Despite this, only 7 anti-submarine warfare helicopters and 2 search and rescue helicopters were planned for the initial aircraft complement. 400 troops and 50 3.5-ton trucks (or equivalent equipment) can also be carried.

Kaga's flight deck has five helicopter landing spots that allow for simultaneous landings or take-offs. Like the Izumo, Kaga features no ski-jump ramp for aircraft takeoff, instead using a long flat flight deck, in a similar manner to the US Wasp-class and America-class amphibious assault ships.

=== Modifications ===
In 2010, Forecast International reported that it looked like some original design features were intended to support fixed-wing aircraft, such as the Bell-Boeing V-22 Osprey and Lockheed Martin F-35 Lightning II; as of 2019, both Kaga and Izumo are scheduled to be refit to accommodate the F-35B STOVL variant during their sequential overhauls, which will take five-years, starting in 2022. Kaga's reconstruction was speculated to begin as early as 2021.

Kaga began her initial modifications in March 2022 at the Japan Marine United (JMU) shipyard in Kure, Hiroshima Prefecture. The proposed modification of Kaga will be more extensive than for her sister ship (and significantly more expensive) and includes changes to the shape of the bow. The initial modification of Kaga was completed in early 2024 and is to be followed by a second modification to the ship's interior, which is expected to begin in late 2026 and be completed by the end of Fiscal Year 2027.

=== Aircraft carried ===
In 2019, it was reported that Prime Minister Shinzo Abe approved a ¥26.2 trillion (US$165.49 billion) five-year defense budget, which included the upgrade of Izumo and Kaga and the purchase of a combined 147 F-35A and F-35B stealth fighters.

According to the newspaper Mainichi Shimbun, the Japan Air Self-Defense Force (JASDF) is planning to acquire a total of 42 F-35B variants: introducing 18 by FY2023, six in FY2024 and two in FY2025. This first batch are to be formed into a single squadron consisting of about 20 aircraft. Japan's Defense Minister, Nobuo Kishi, announced that Nyutabaru Air Base in Miyazaki Prefecture, Kyushu will host the F-35Bs. The base is located near the Southwest Islands, including Okinawa, and JMSDF's Kure Base in Hiroshima Prefecture, which is Kaga's home port.

=== Size ===
Kaga is 814 feet (248 m) long and displaces 27,000 tons, making her the largest ship in the Japan Maritime Self-Defense Force. She is in the category of light carriers, such as Italy's Cavour, and sized similar to many nations' dedicated amphibious ships. She is considerably smaller than 'super' aircraft carriers – the USS George H.W. Bush, for instance, is 1,092 feet (333 m) long and over 100,000 tons.

=== Air defense ===
The ship is equipped with two Phalanx CIWS (close-in weapon systems) and two SeaRAM CIWS for her defense.

== History ==
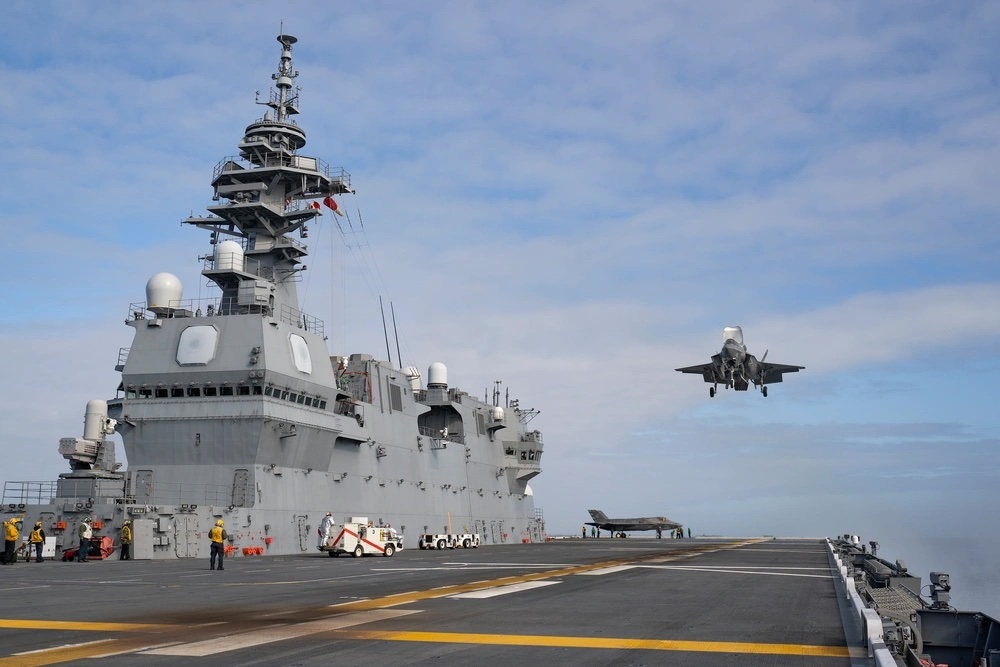
A USMC F-35B lands aboard Kaga during training exercises in 2024

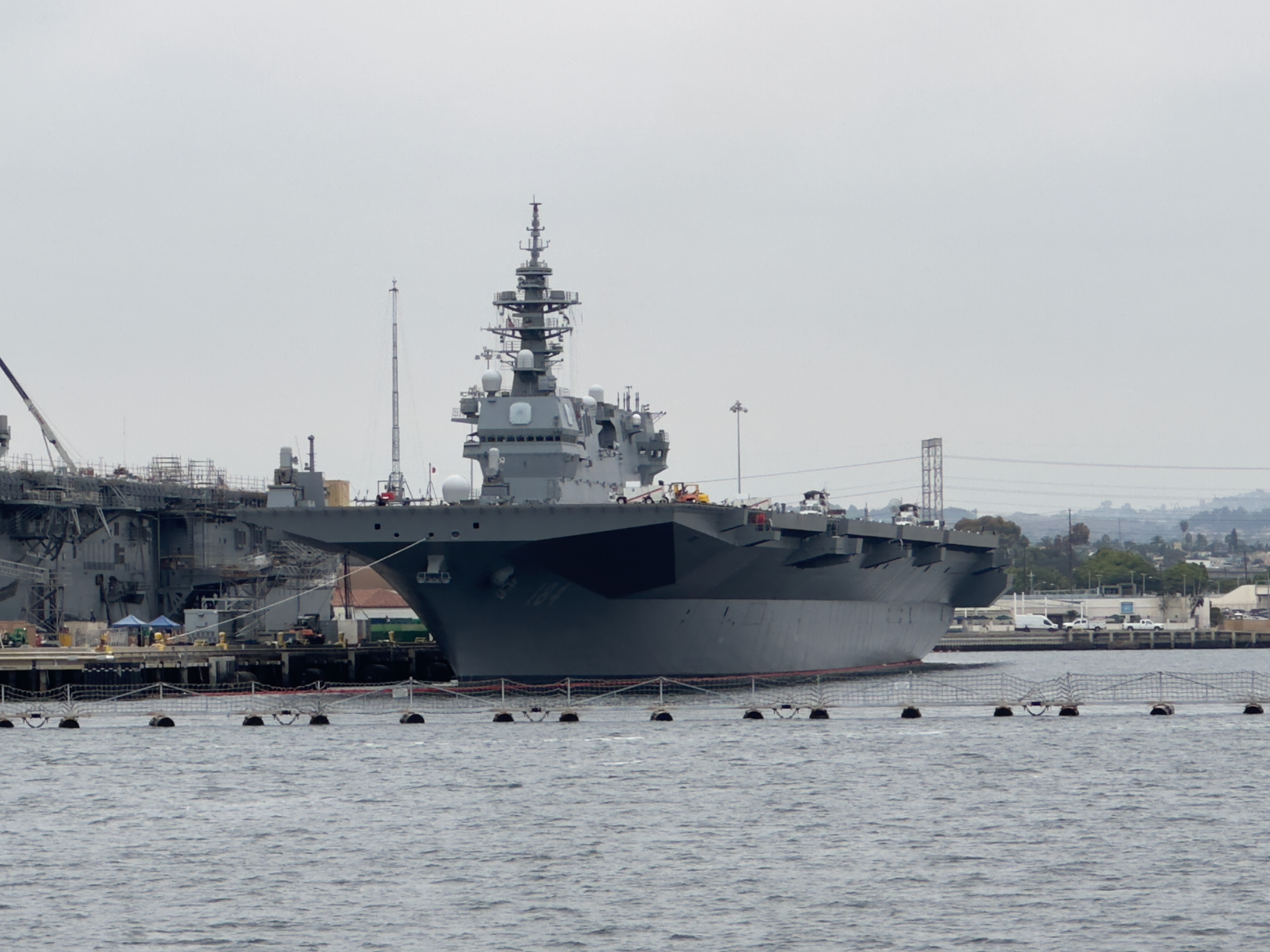
JS Kaga at San Diego Naval Base, October 2024

Kaga toured the South China Sea and the Indian Ocean during the Indo Southeast Asia Deployment (ISEAD) exercise in 2018 to bolster Japan's presence in geostrategic waters, eventually sailing to the Philippines, Singapore, Indonesia, India, and Sri Lanka.

During a state visit to Japan in May 2019, Donald Trump visited Kaga in Yokosuka. During his visit, Trump made a speech in which he claimed that many of the United States's allies were taking advantage of its high defense budget by not spending enough on their militaries. Trump congratulated Japan for "...being a good ally and buying American..." and wished them success in the coming Reiwa Era.

Between October and November 2024, Kaga conducted F-35B Lightning II Joint Strike Fighter developmental tests off the coast of California in preparation for the arrival of Japan's own F-35Bs. The F-35Bs were from Air Test and Evaluation Squadron 23 of the United States Navy, and the pilots were from the F-35 Patuxent River Integrated Test Force (Pax ITF). On 7 November 2024, the Japanese Maritime Self-Defense Force announced that the trials had been completed already.

== In popular culture ==
Kaga's mascot is the personification of her World War II-era predecessor in Kantai Collection, where she is one of the most popular characters of the franchise. It began when Kadokawa Games shared official art on Twitter, depicting 1928 Kaga's Kantai Collection counterpart holding a scale model of the new Kaga the day after she was launched. It then continued when Kaga participated in the Indo Southeast Asia Deployment (ISEAD) exercise in 2018. Upon her return to Kure, Kantai Collection provided new art of their personification of Kaga wearing the new ship's insignia, with her rigging updated to match that of the new ship and featuring helicopters instead of World War II aircraft.

Kaga is also featured in the Marvel Cinematic Universe film Captain America: Brave New World as part of the Japanese fleet contesting Celestial Island. She is the target of a brainwashed US Navy pilot's kamikaze run when his F/A-18 runs out of missiles, and is saved by the titular Captain America, Sam Wilson.

== Gallery ==
JS Kaga

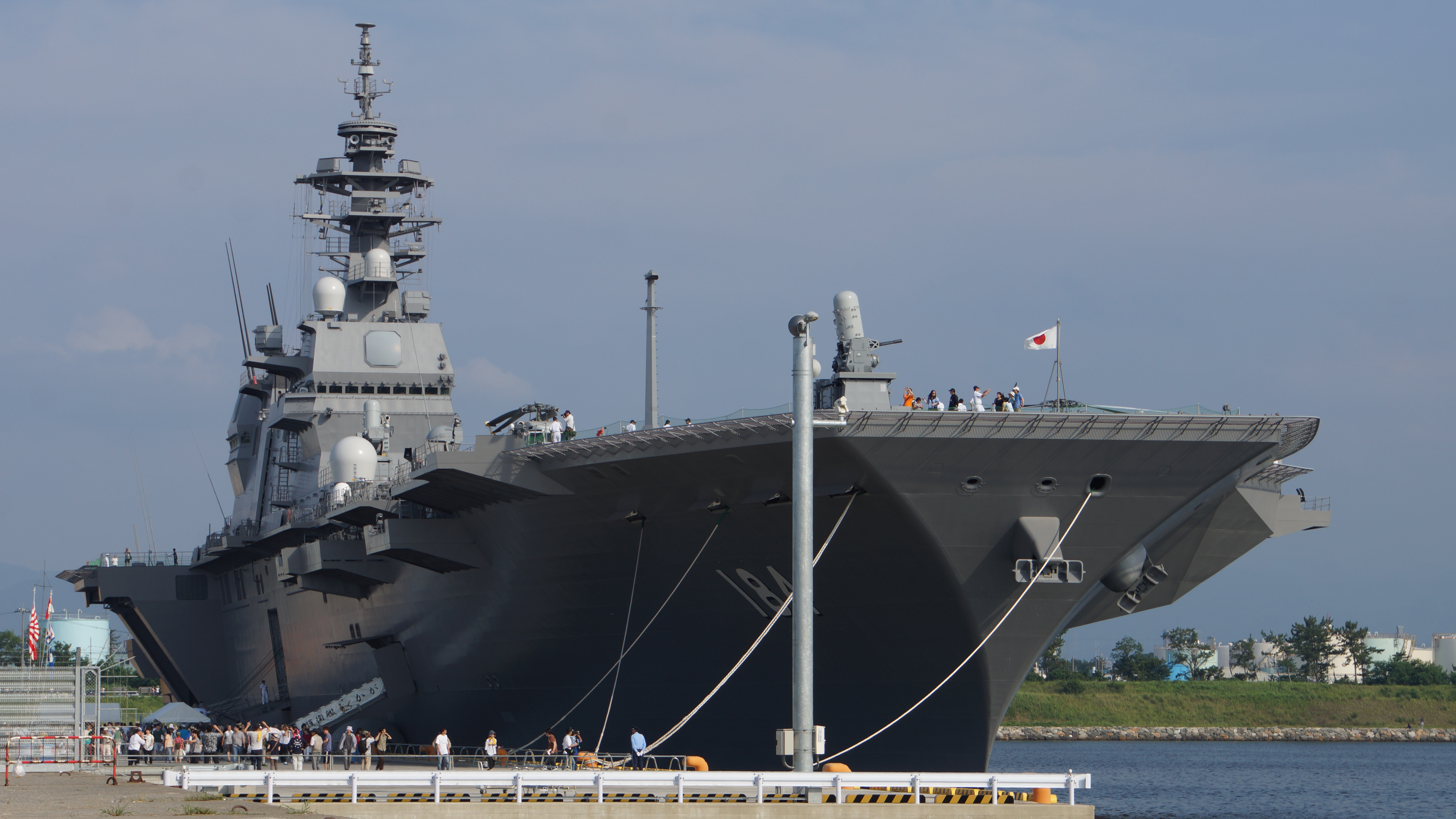
JS Kaga right front view at Port of Kanazawa (15 July 2017)

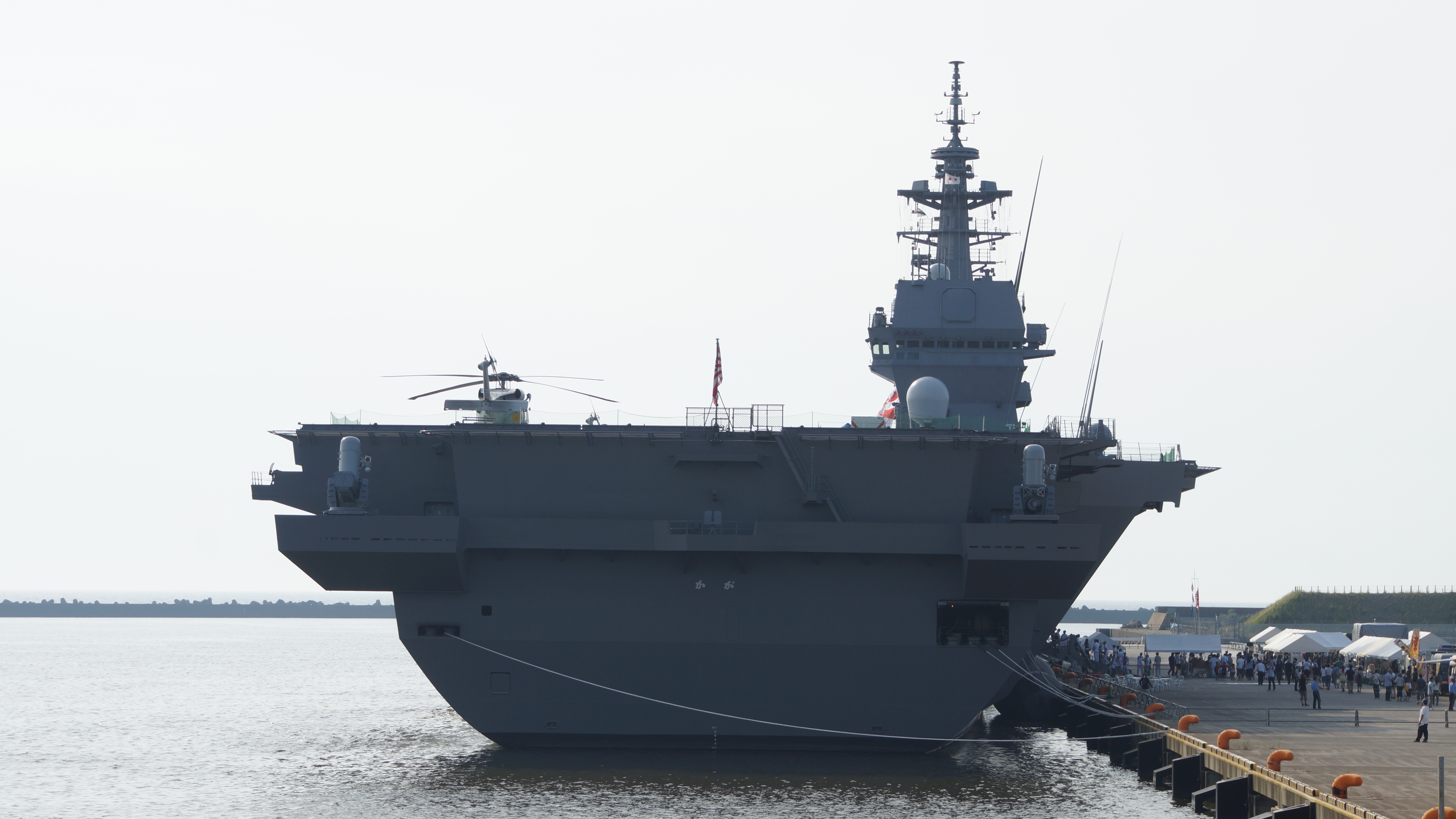
Kaga stern view, July 2017

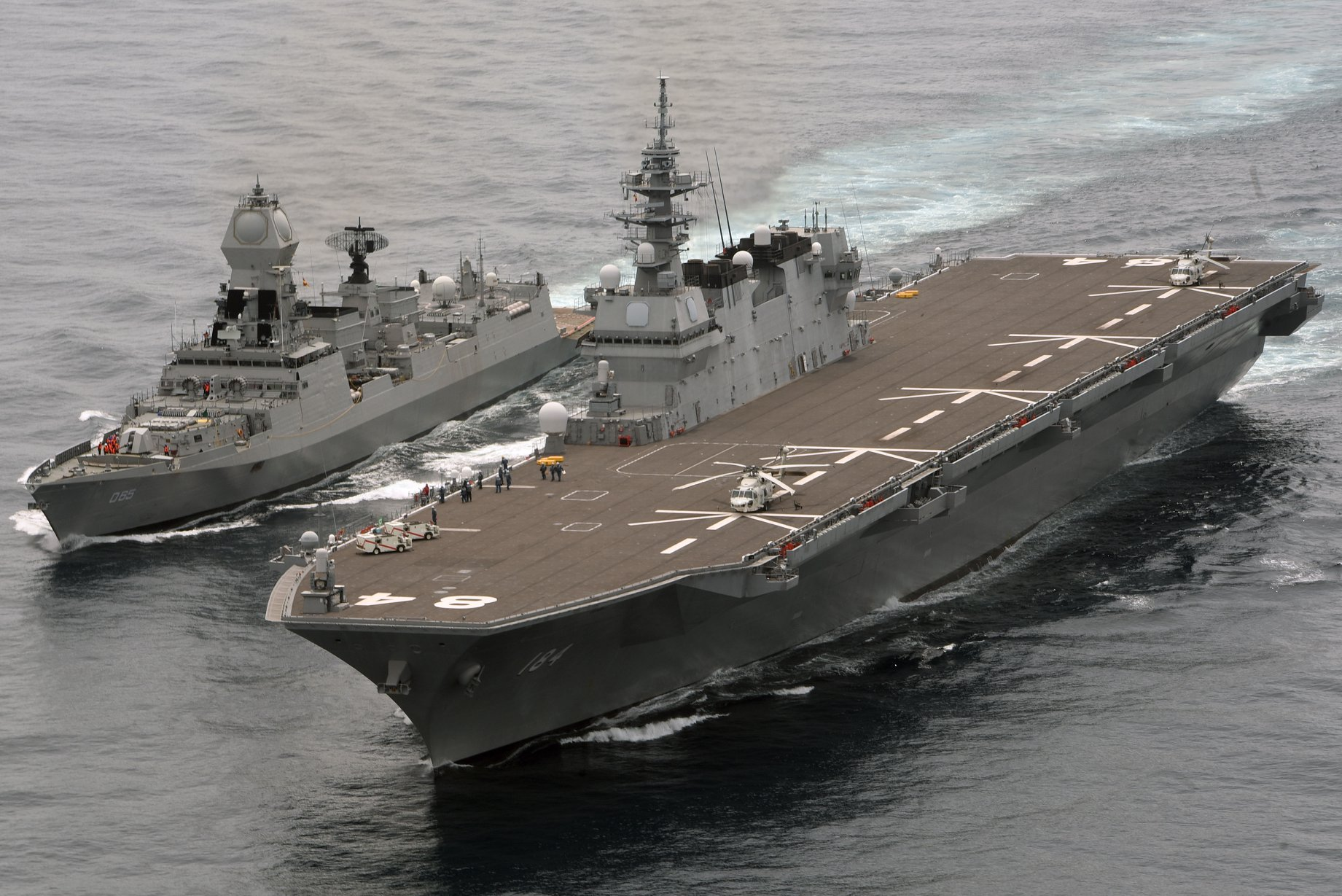
JS Kaga with INS Chennai during JIMEX 2020 exercise.

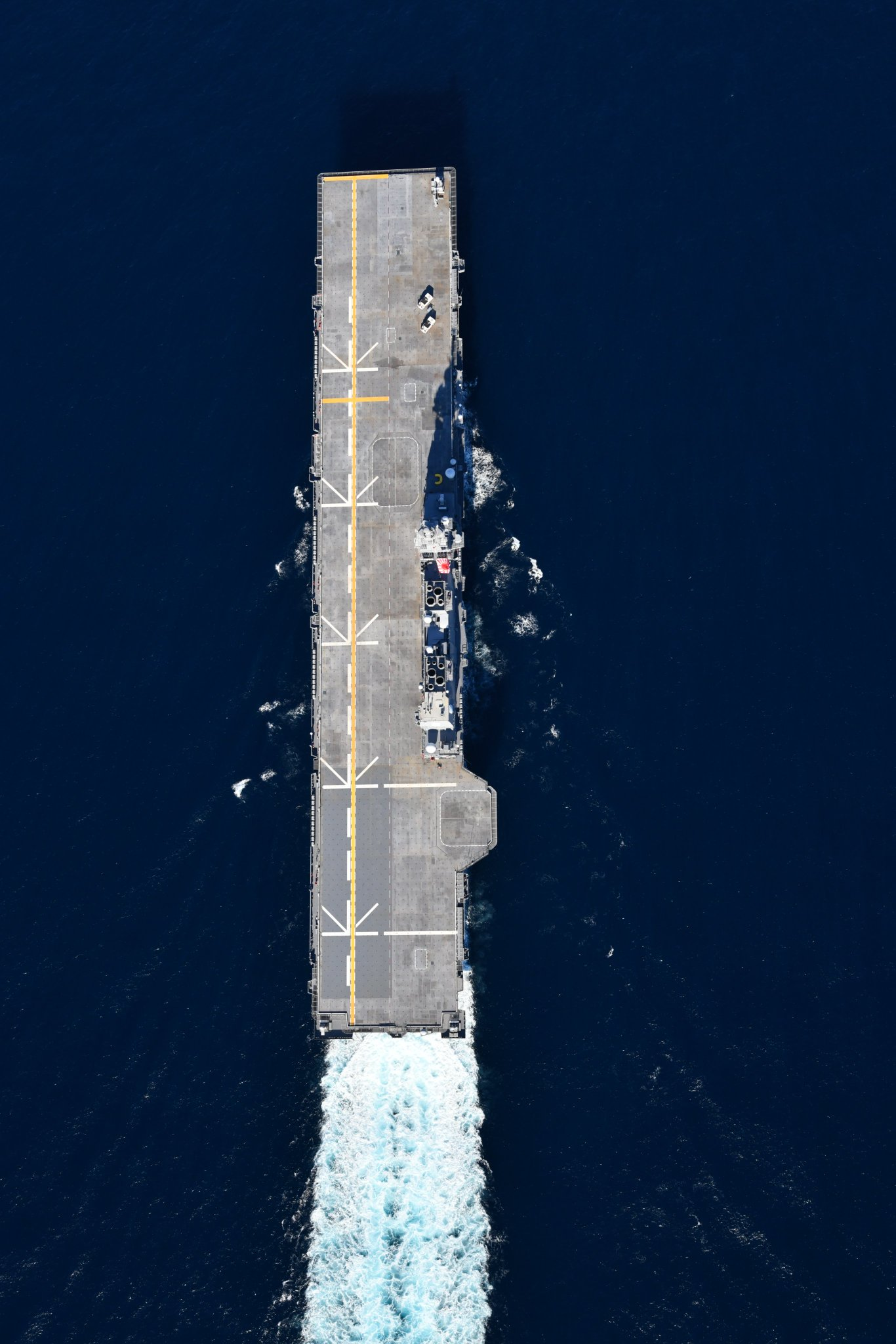
Kaga viewed from above after being modified to operate fixed wing aircraft
