= JS Samidare =

Destroyer of the Japan Maritime Self-Defense Force

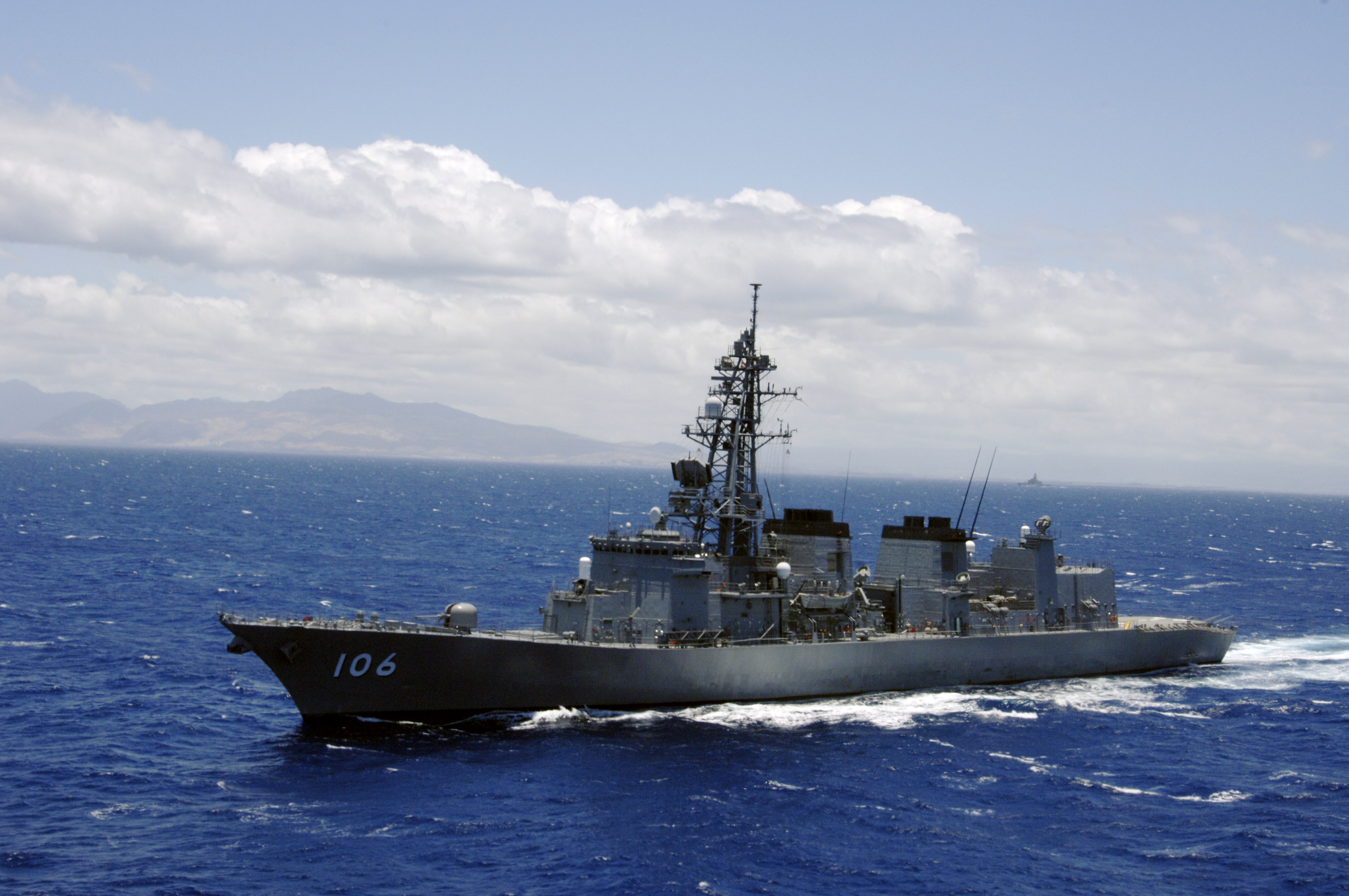
- JS Samidare on 5 July 2006

History

Japan
- Name: Samidare; (さみだれ)
- Ordered: 1995
- Builder: IHI Corporation, Tokyo
- Laid down: 11 September 1997
- Launched: 24 September 1998
- Commissioned: 21 March 2000
- Home port: Kure
- Identification: MMSI number: 431999645; Pennant number:DD-106
- Status: Active

General characteristics
- Class & type: Murasame-class destroyer
- Displacement: 4,550 tons standard, 6,200 tons hull load
- Length: 151 m (495 ft 5 in)
- Beam: 17.4 m (57 ft 1 in)
- Draft: 5.2 m (17 ft 1 in)
- Propulsion: 2 × IHI-GE LM2500 gas turbines; 2 × KHI-RR SM1C gas turbines; 60,000 shp (45 MW); 2 shafts, cp props
- Speed: 30 knots (56 km/h; 35 mph)
- Complement: 165
- Sensors & processing systems: OYQ-9 CDS (w/ Link-11); OYQ-103 ASWCS; FCS-2-31 fire-control systems; OPS-24B air search radar; OPS-28 surface search radar; OQS-5 hull sonar; OQR-2 TASS
- Electronic warfare & decoys: NOLQ-3 suite; Mk. 36 SRBOC Chaff and Decoy Launching System; AN/SLQ-25 torpedo decoys
- Armament: 1 × OTO Melara 76 mm gun; 2 × 20 mm Phalanx CIWS; 8 × SSM-1B Anti-ship missile in quad canisters; 2 × triple 324 mm torpedo tubes; 16-cell Mk. 48 VLS with Evolved Sea Sparrow SAM; 16-cell Mk. 41 VLS with VL-ASROC
- Aircraft carried: 1 × SH-60J/K anti-submarine helicopter

JS Samidare (DD-106) is the sixth Murasame-class destroyer of the Japan Maritime Self-Defense Force (JMSDF). She was commissioned on 21 March 2000.

== Design ==
In the Murasame class, the hull design was completely renovated from first-generation destroyers. In addition to increasing the size in order to reduce the underwater radiation noise, both the superstructure and hull were inclined to reduce the radar cross-section. However, there is no angled tripod mainmast as on American Arleigh Burke-class destroyers because of the heavy weather of the Sea of Japan in winter. The aft was designed like a "mini-Oranda-zaka" as with the Kongō class to avoid interference between helicopters and mooring devices. Destroyers built under the First Defense Build-up Plan, including the former Murasame class, adopted a unique long forecastle style called "Oranda-zaka".

The engine arrangement is COGAG, the same as in the Asagiri class, (the Murasame's predecessor class) but a pair of engines were updated to Spey SM1Cs, and the remaining pair were replaced by LM2500s, as used in the Kongō class.

== Construction and career ==
Samidare was laid down on 11 September 1997, by Ishikawajima Harima Heavy Industries at Tokyo as part of the 1995 plan and launched on 24 September 1998. Commissioned on 21 March 2000, the vessel was incorporated into the 4th Escort Corps and deployed to Kure.

Samidare was deployed to Somalia in 2009 as part of multinational anti-piracy efforts to protect ships passing through the Indian Ocean alongside Sazanami.

Samidare destroyer participated in Japan-US-India Joint Training (Malabar 2019) from 26 September to 4 October 2019. Exercises were carried out in the sea and airspace from Sasebo to the south of the Kanto region. The JMSDF also sent other escort vessels JS Chōkai and JS Kaga, supply vessel JS Ōmi, and P-1 patrol aircraft. USS McCampbell, a P-8A aircraft, and a submarine from the United States Navy, INS Sahyadri, INS Kiltan, and a P-8I aircraft from the Indian Navy participated in anti-submarine warfare training, anti-submarine warfare training, conducted anti-water shooting training, anti-aircraft shooting training, and offshore replenishment training.

On 16 October of the same year, Samidare conducted communication training using radio with the Chinese Navy destroyer Taiyun (which was scheduled to participate in the JMSDF Fleet review on 14 October, but canceled due to Typhoon Hagibis) in the Pacific Ocean south of Kanto region. This was the third Japan-China goodwill training for the JMSDF, the previous being in December 2011.

On 4 May 2022, Samidare deployed to Djibouti for anti-piracy operations. In late May, Samidare was relieved by Harusame.

On 20 June 2024, Samidare arrived at the Port of Colombo, Sri Lanka, as part of a formal visit. Following the completion of the official engagement, the vessel departed from the island on 22 June 2024.

Samidare again arrived at the port of Colombo on 17 November on a formal visit. The vessel is captained by Commander Naoki Koga, and will depart the island on 19 November 2024.

== Gallery ==
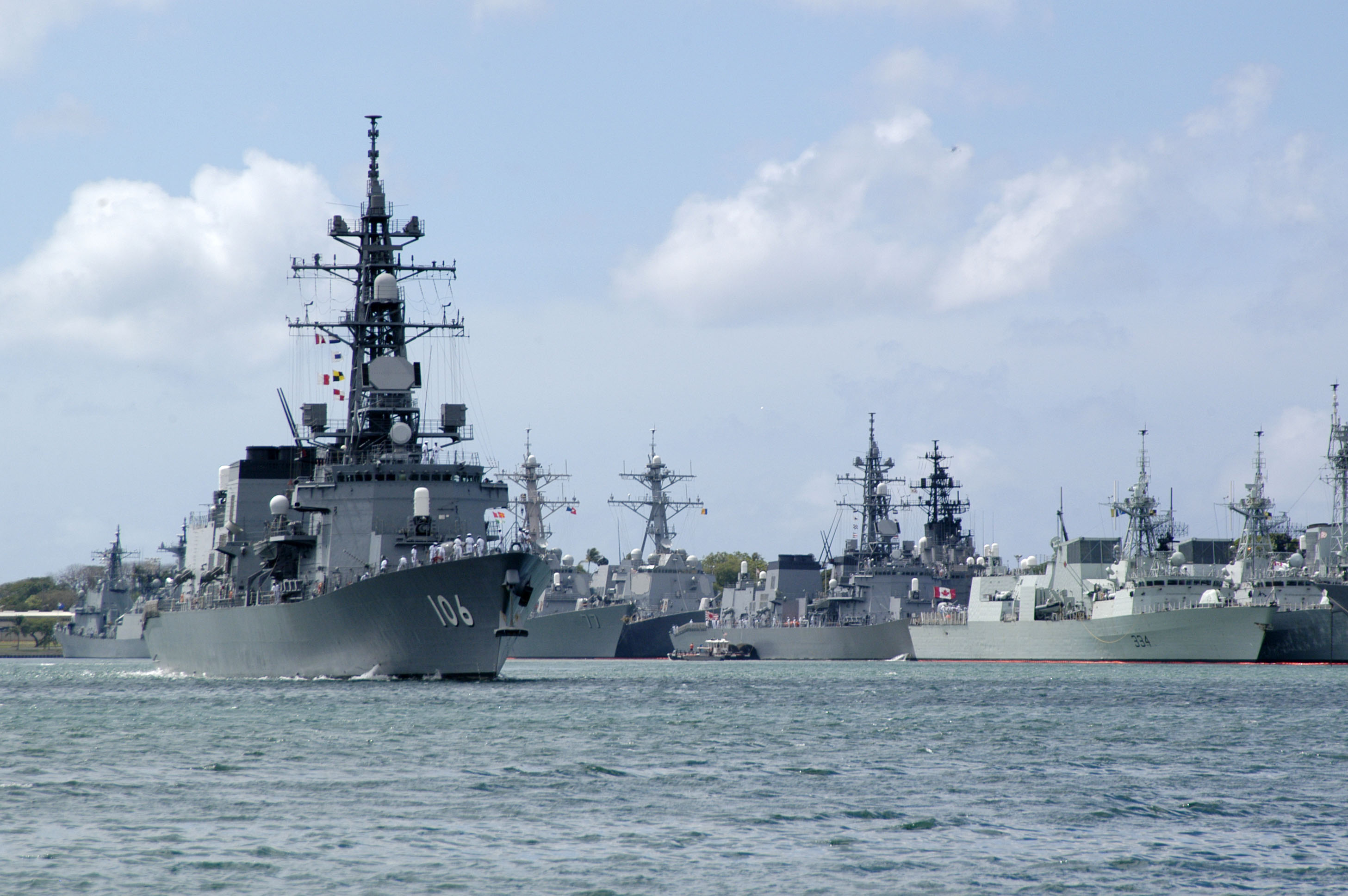
Samidare departing Pearl Harbor on 5 July 2006.

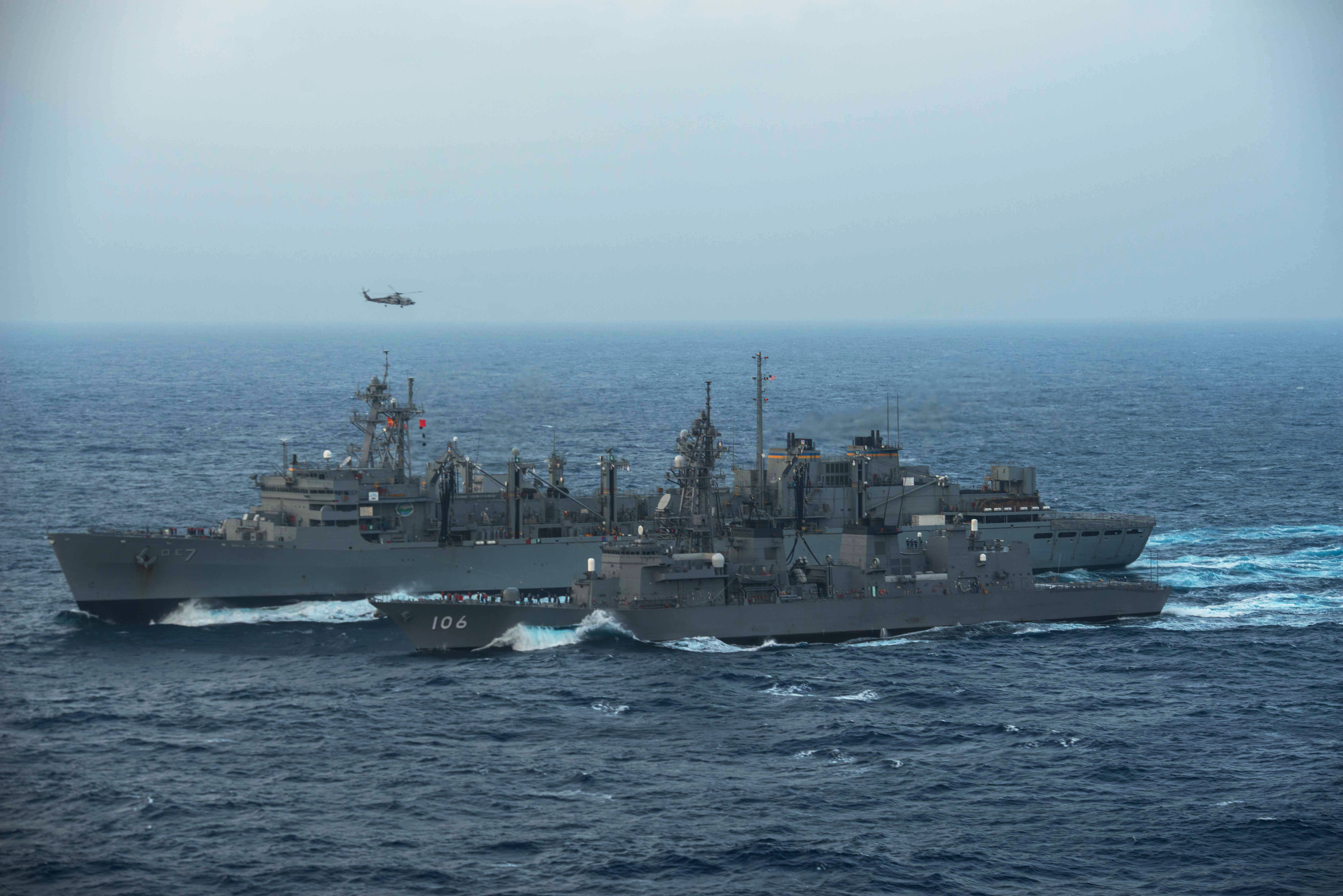
Samidare replenished by USNS Rainier on 22 February 2016.

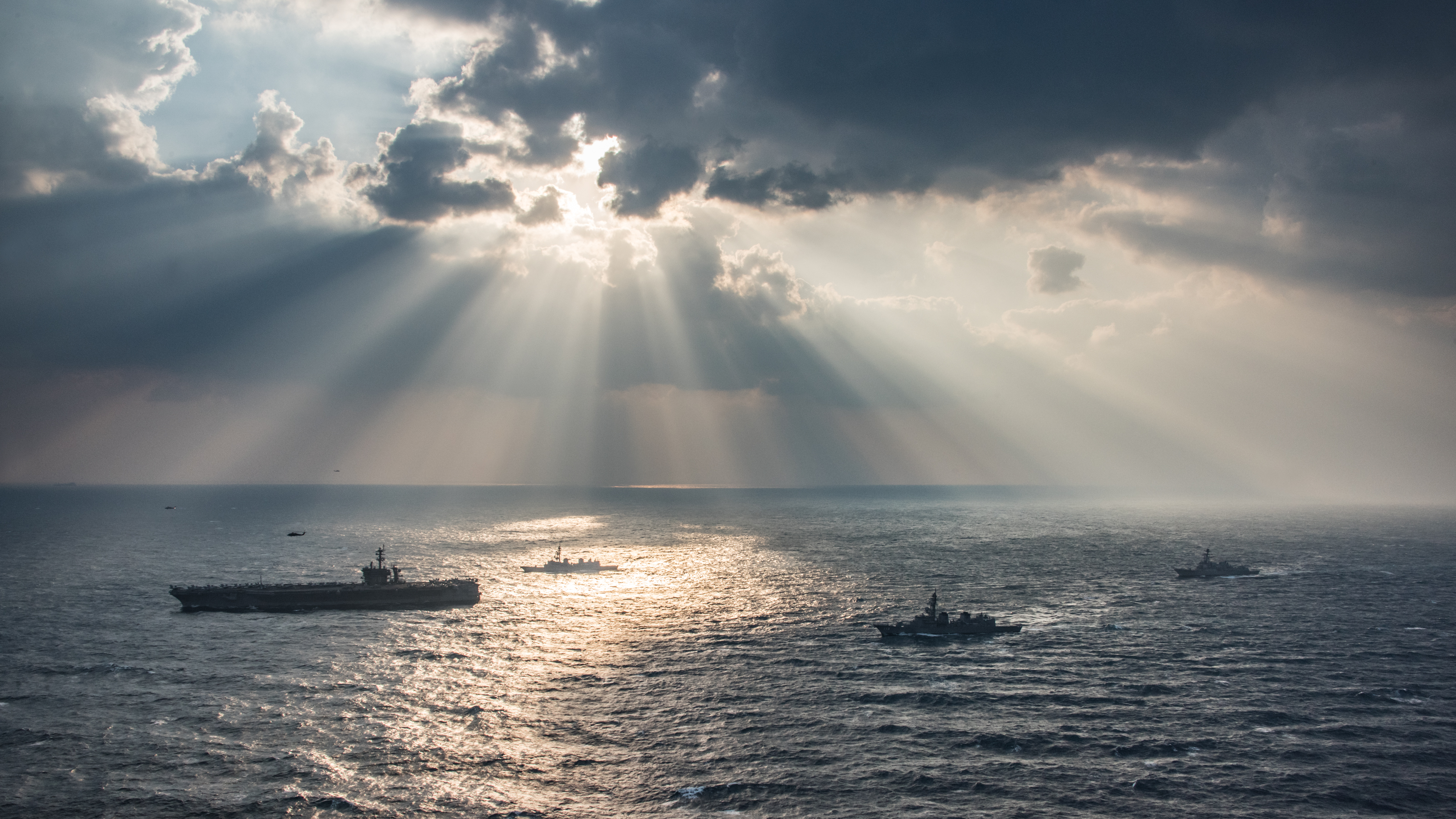
Samidare, JS Sazanami, USS Wayne E. Meyer and USS Carl Vinson on 8 March 2017.

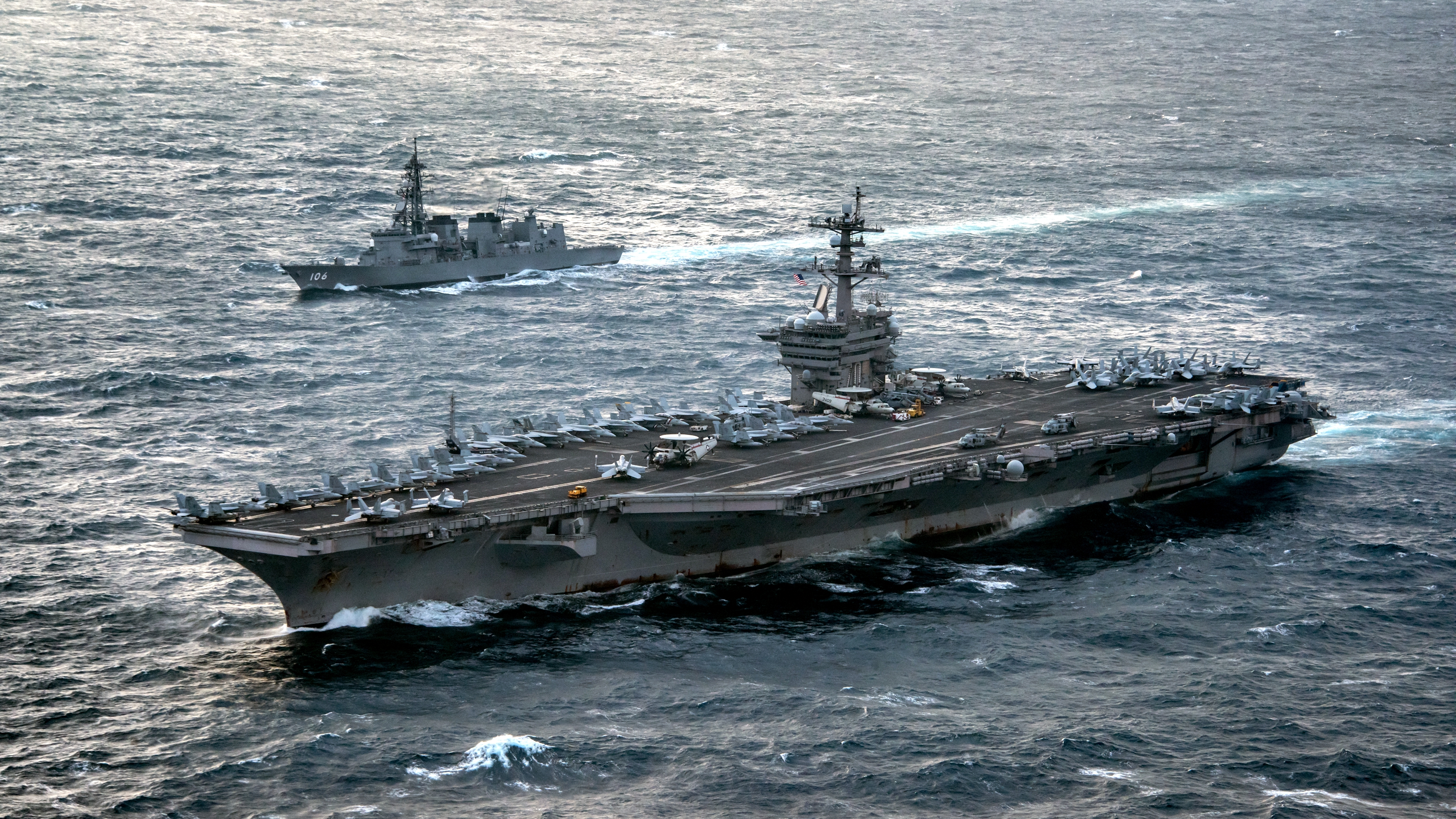
Samidare alongside USS Carl Vinson on 8 March 2017.

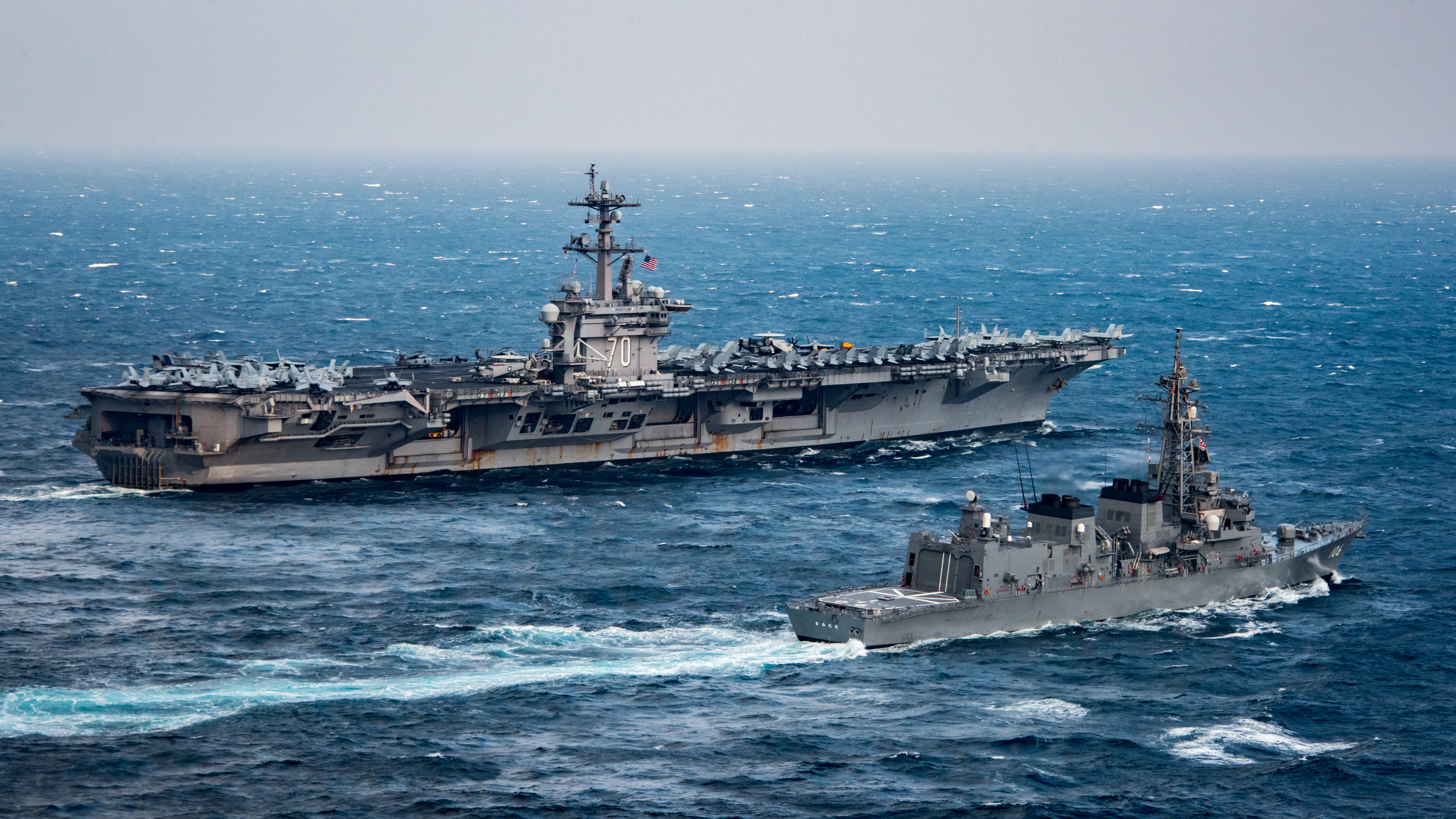
Samidare alongside USS Carl Vinson on 8 March 2017.

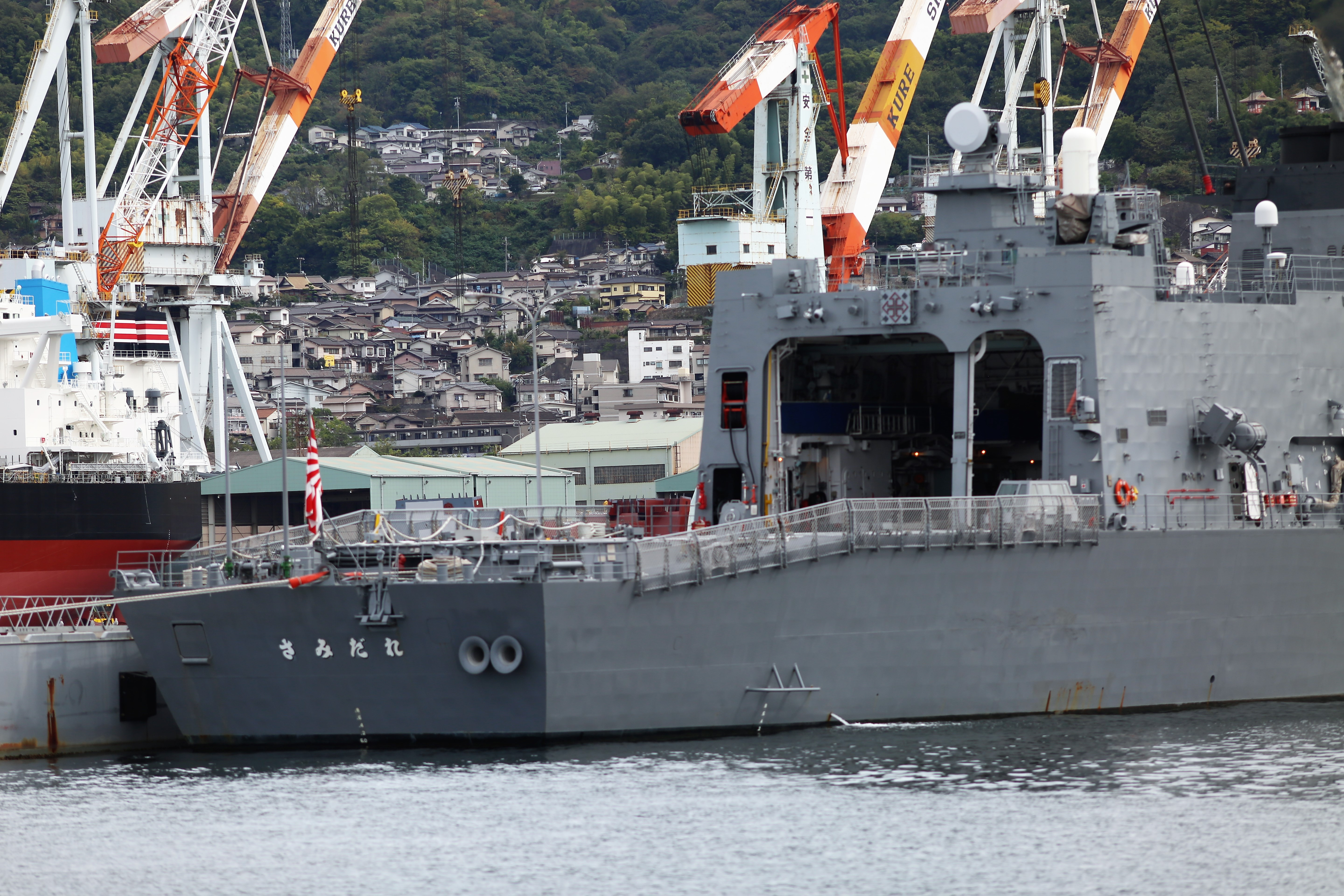
Samidare on 20 October 2019.

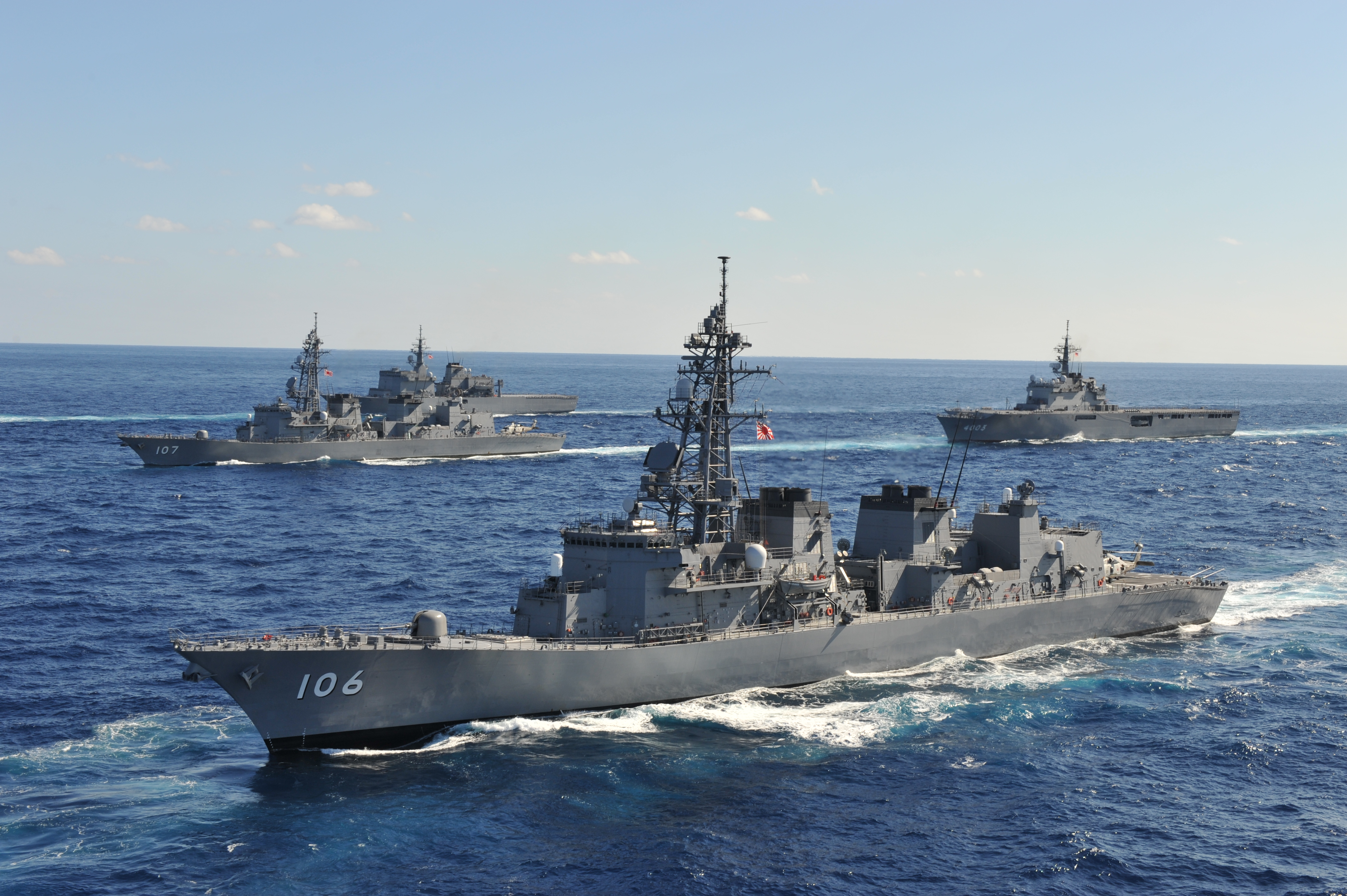
Samidare in formation with JS Ikazuchi, JS Uraga, and JS Kunisaki, 21 December 2020.

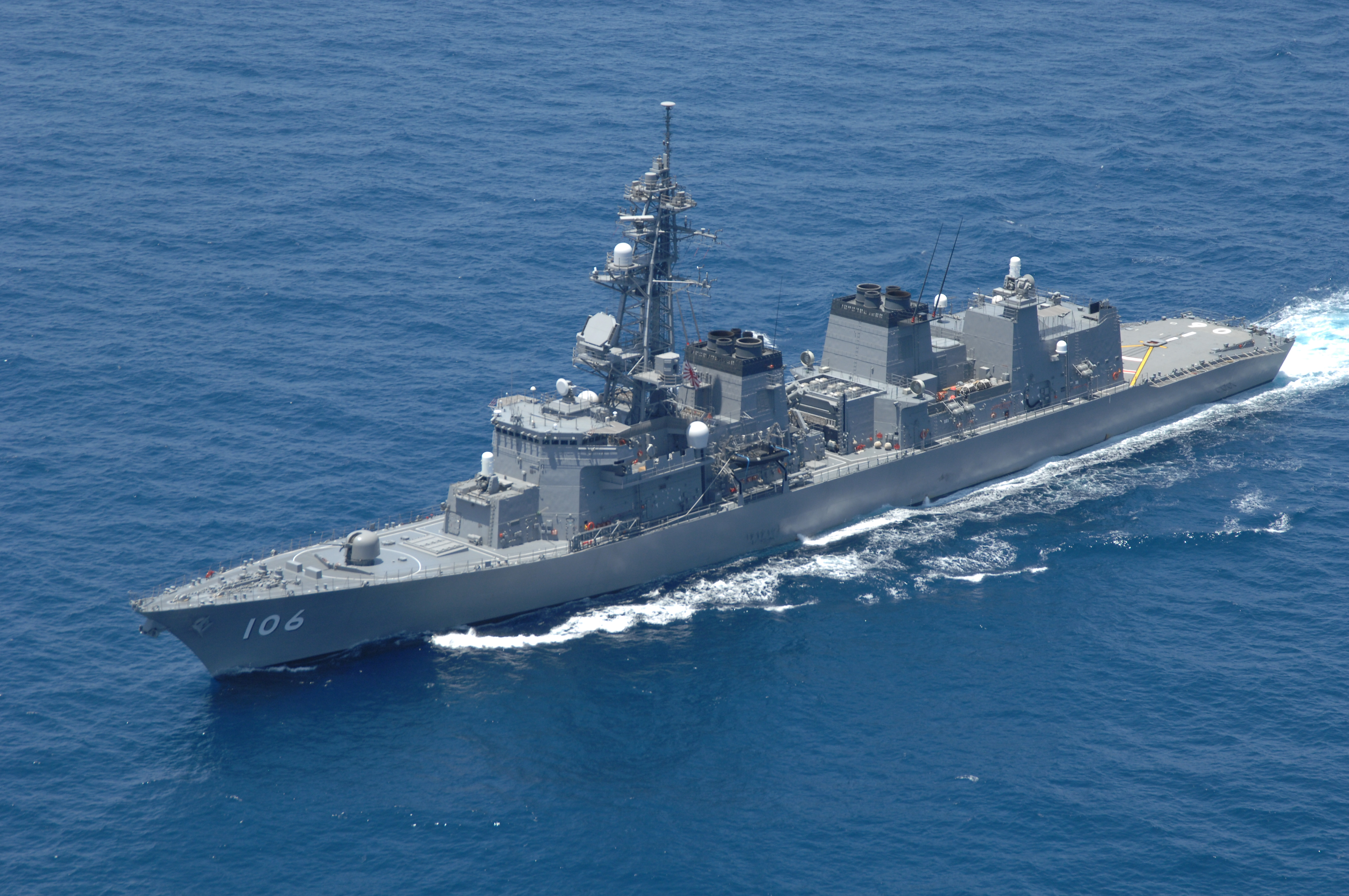
Samidare underway, 19 April 2021

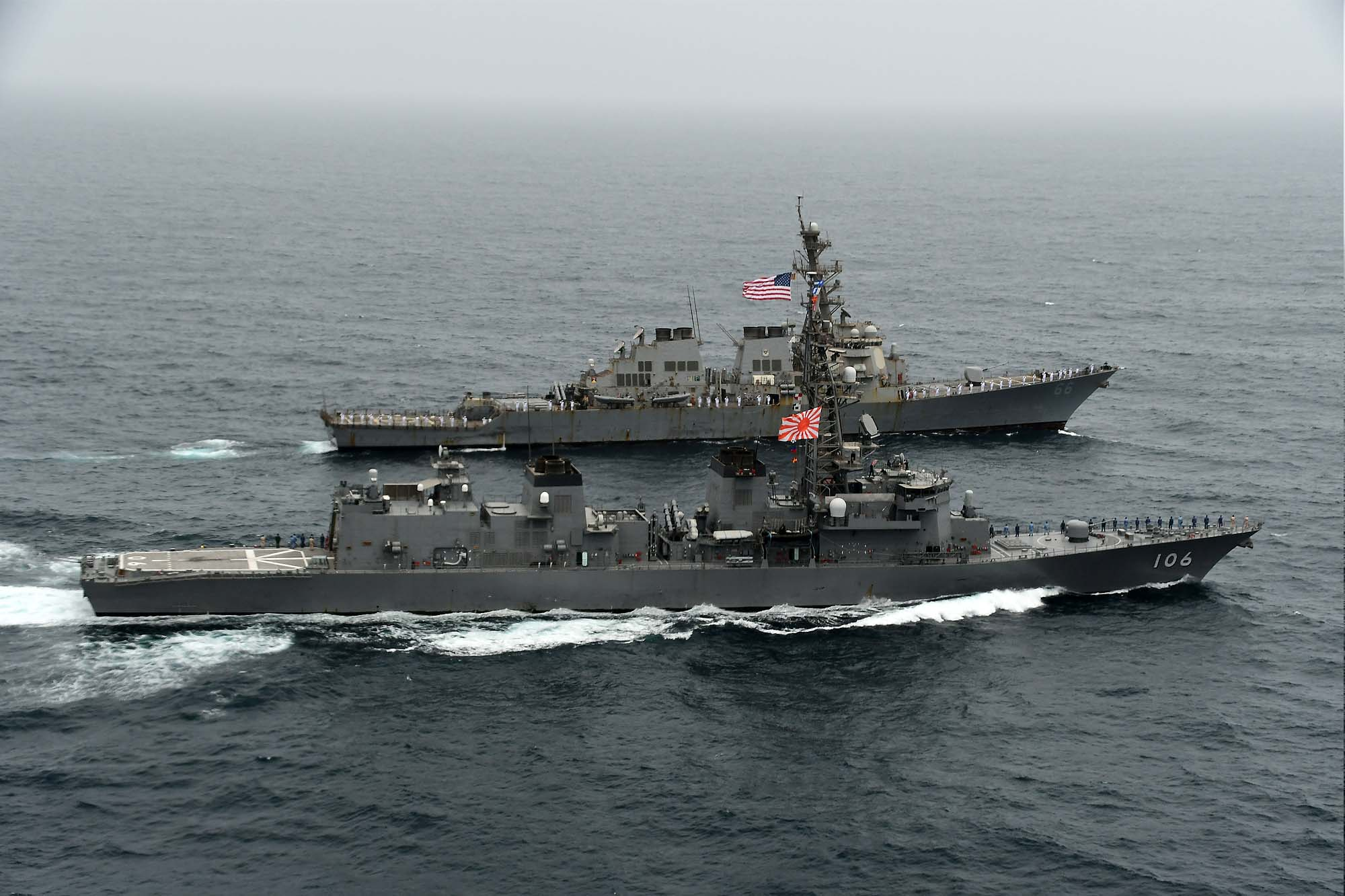
Samidare conducts training with USS Gonzalez, 28 June 2022.
