= JS Ikazuchi (DD-107) =

Destroyer of the Japan Maritime Self-Defense Force

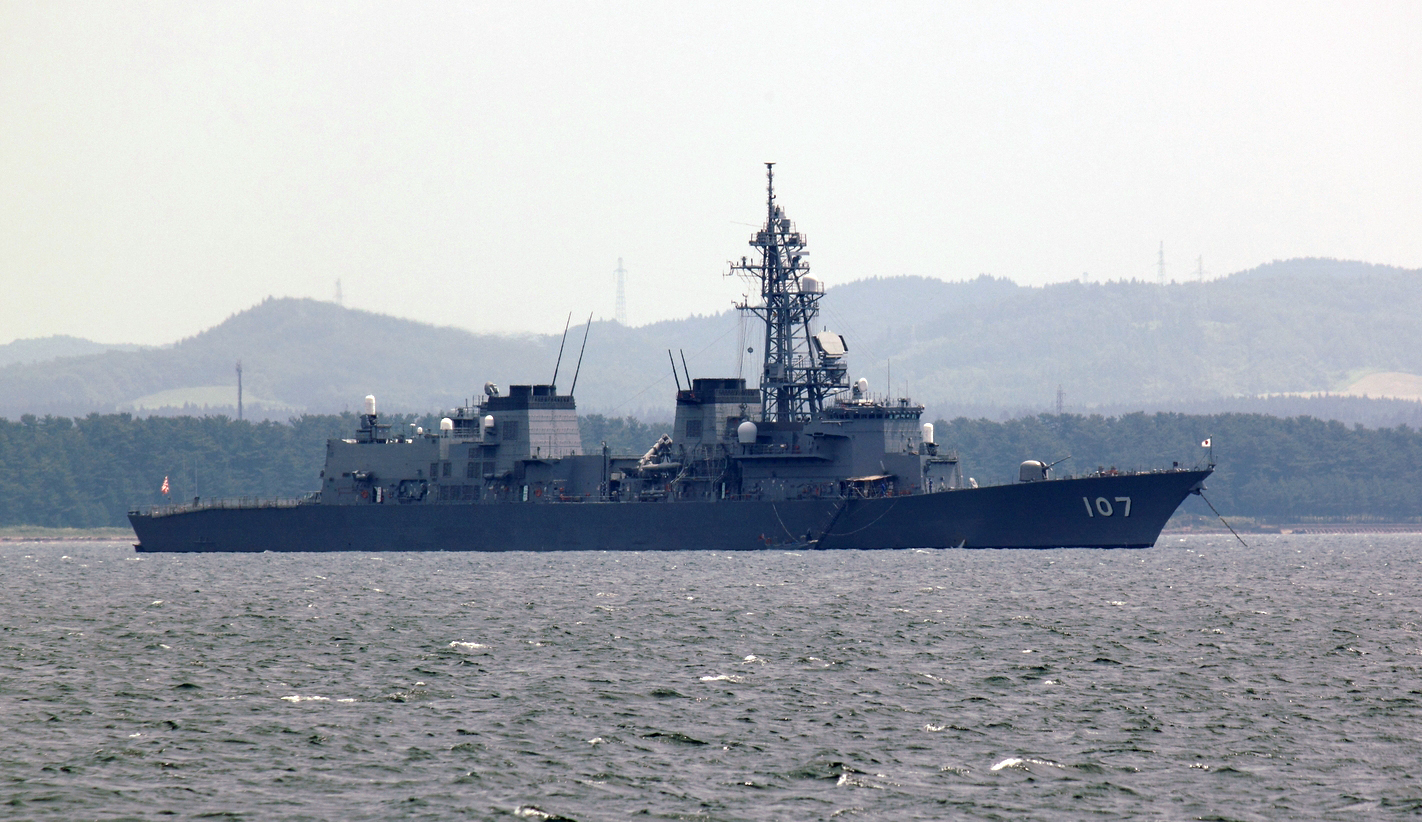
- JS Ikazuchi on 28 July 2010

History

Japan
- Name: Ikazuchi; (いかづち)
- Ordered: 1996
- Builder: Hitachi, Maizuru
- Laid down: 25 February 1998
- Launched: 24 June 1999
- Commissioned: 14 March 2001
- Home port: Yokosuka
- Identification: MMSI number: 431999648; Pennant number:DD-107
- Status: Active

General characteristics
- Class & type: Murasame-class destroyer
- Displacement: 4,550 tons standard, 6,200 tons hull load
- Length: 151 m (495 ft 5 in)
- Beam: 17.4 m (57 ft 1 in)
- Draft: 5.2 m (17 ft 1 in)
- Propulsion: 2 × IHI-GE LM2500 gas turbines; 2 × KHI-RR SM1C gas turbines; 60,000 shp (45 MW); 2 shafts, cp props
- Speed: 30 knots (56 km/h; 35 mph)
- Complement: 165
- Sensors & processing systems: OYQ-9 CDS (w/ Link-11); OYQ-103 ASWCS; FCS-2-31 fire-control systems; OPS-24B air search radar; OPS-28 surface search radar; OQS-5 hull sonar; OQR-2 TASS
- Electronic warfare & decoys: NOLQ-3 suite; Mk. 36 SRBOC Chaff and Decoy Launching System; AN/SLQ-25 torpedo decoys
- Armament: 1 × OTO Melara 76 mm gun; 2 × 20 mm Phalanx CIWS; 8 × SSM-1B Anti-ship missile in quad canisters; 2 × triple 324 mm torpedo tubes; 16-cell Mk. 48 VLS with Evolved Sea Sparrow SAM; 16-cell Mk. 41 VLS with VL-ASROC
- Aircraft carried: 1 × SH-60J/K anti-submarine helicopter

JS Ikazuchi (DD-107) is the seventh ship of the Murasame-class destroyers in service with the Japan Maritime Self-Defense Force. She was commissioned on 14 March 2001.

== Design ==
The hull design was completely renovated from first-generation destroyers. In addition to increasing the size in order to reduce the underwater radiation noise, both the superstructure and hull were inclined to reduce the radar cross-section. However, there is no angled tripod mainmast like that of the American Arleigh Burke-class destroyer because of the heavy weather of the Sea of Japan in winter. The aft was designed like a "mini-Oranda-zaka" as with the Kongō class to avoid interference between helicopters and mooring devices. Destroyers built under the First Defense Build-up Plan, including the former Murasame class, adopted a unique long forecastle style called "Oranda-zaka".

The engine arrangement is COGAG as same as Asagiri class, but a pair of engines are updated to Spey SM1C. And the remaining one pair are replaced by LM2500, same as the Kongō class.

== Construction and career ==
Ikazuchi was laid down on 25 February 1998 at Hitachi Zosen Corporation Maizuru as the 1996 plan and launched on 24 June 1999. Commissioned on 14 March 2001, the destroyer was incorporated into the 5th Escort Corps of the 1st Escort Corps and deployed to Yokosuka.

From 15 to 18 August 2020, joint training was conducted with elements of the US Navy which consisted of the aircraft carrier USS Ronald Reagan and several other ships in the sea and airspace south of Okinawa.

== Gallery ==
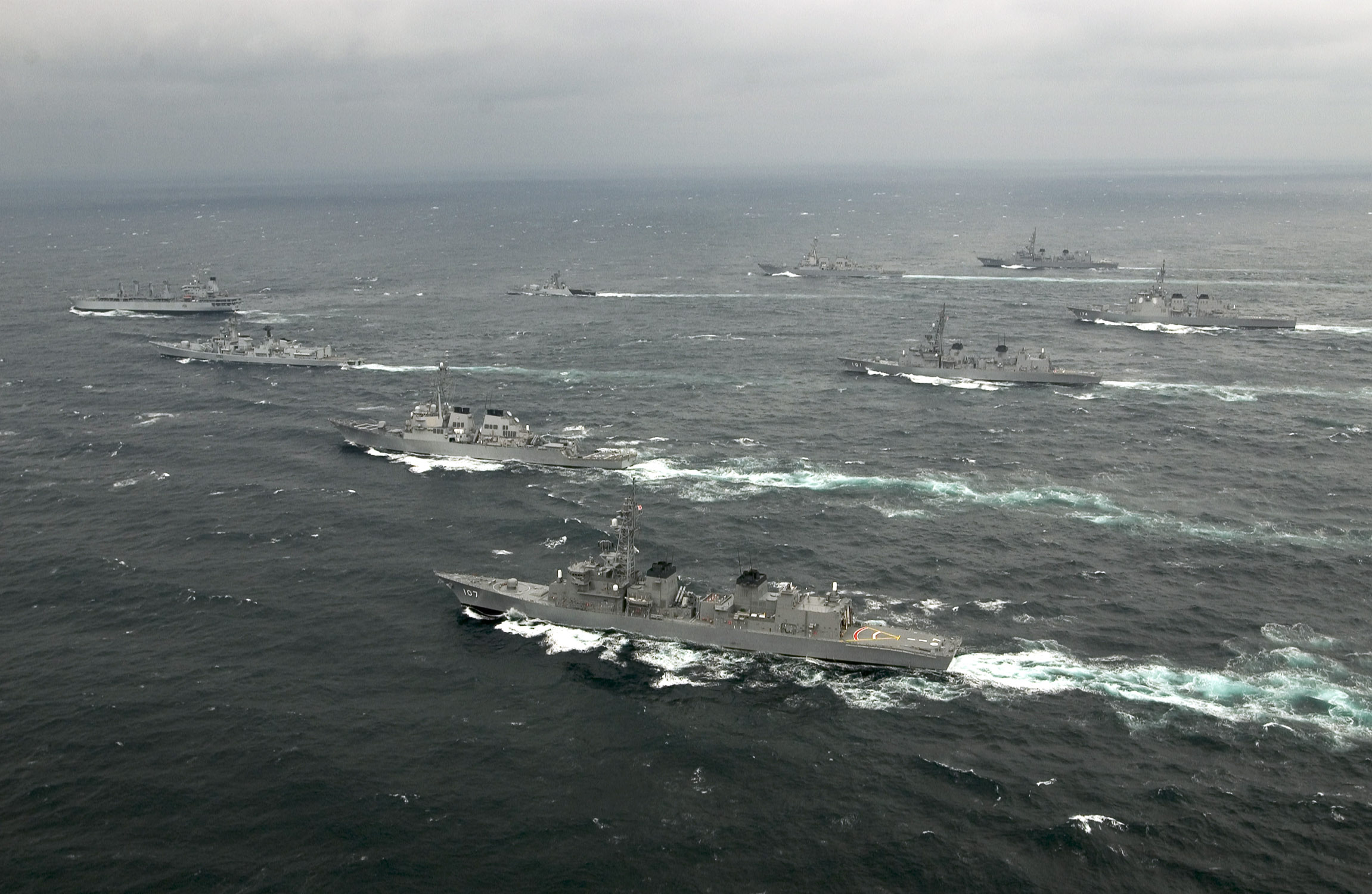
JS Ikazuchi sails with INS Jyoti, USS John S. McCain, INS Kuthar, JS Murasame, USS Mustin, JS Kirishima, and JS Takanami, 16 April 2007.

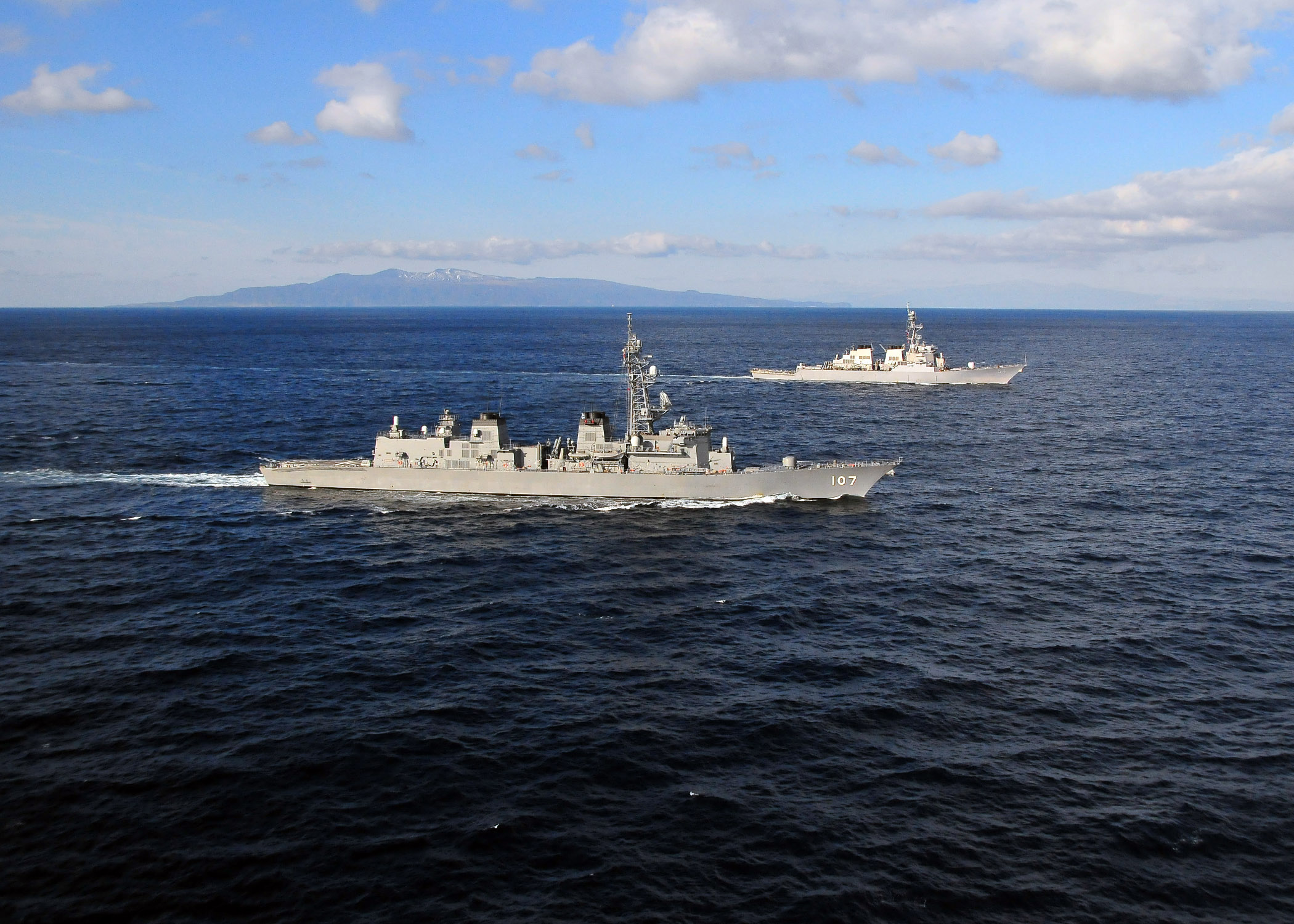
JS Ikazuchi sails with USS Curtis Wilbur in Sagami Bay, 5 February 2010.

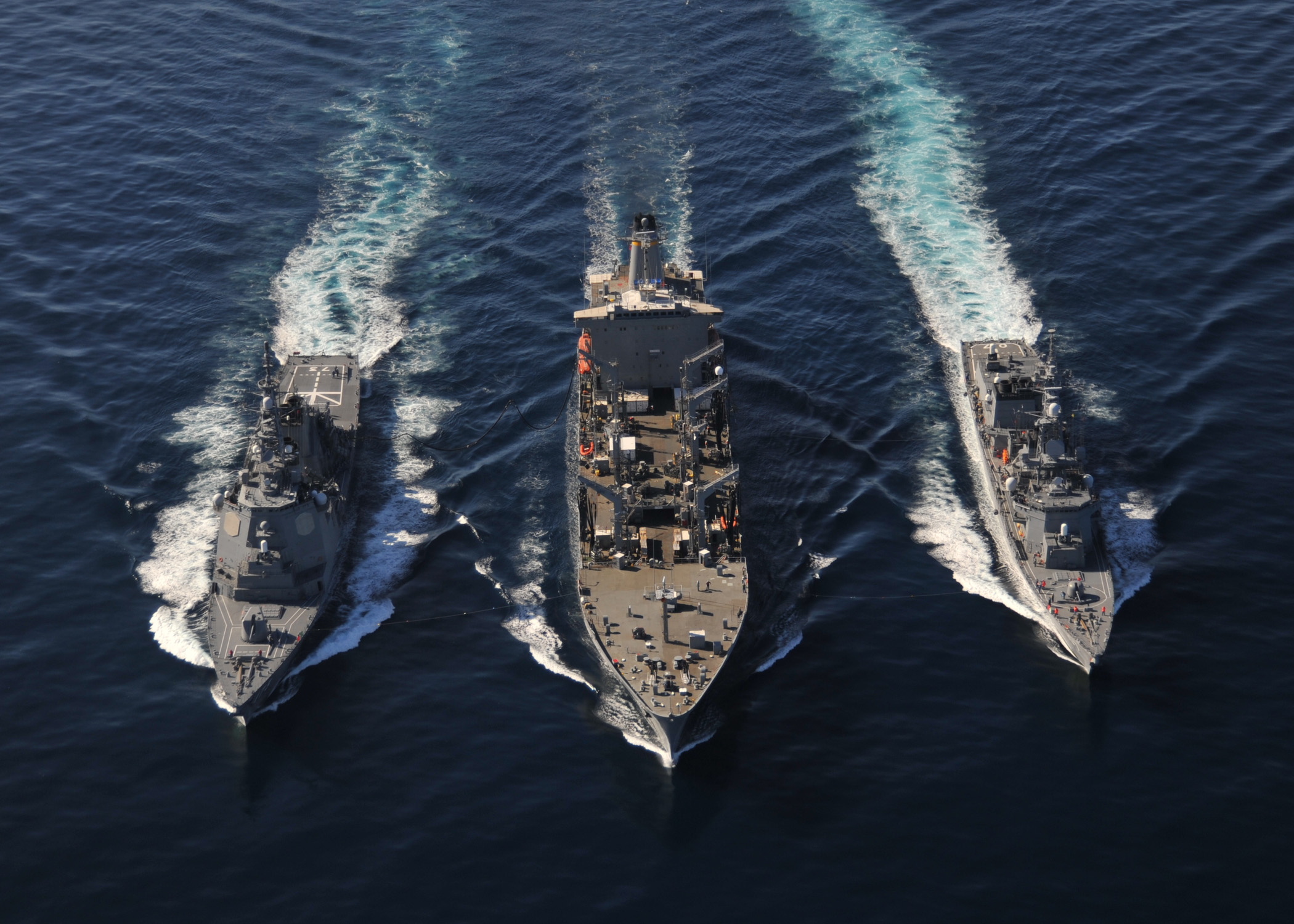
JS Ikazuchi and JS Kongō replenish with USNS Tippecanoe on 5 December 2010.

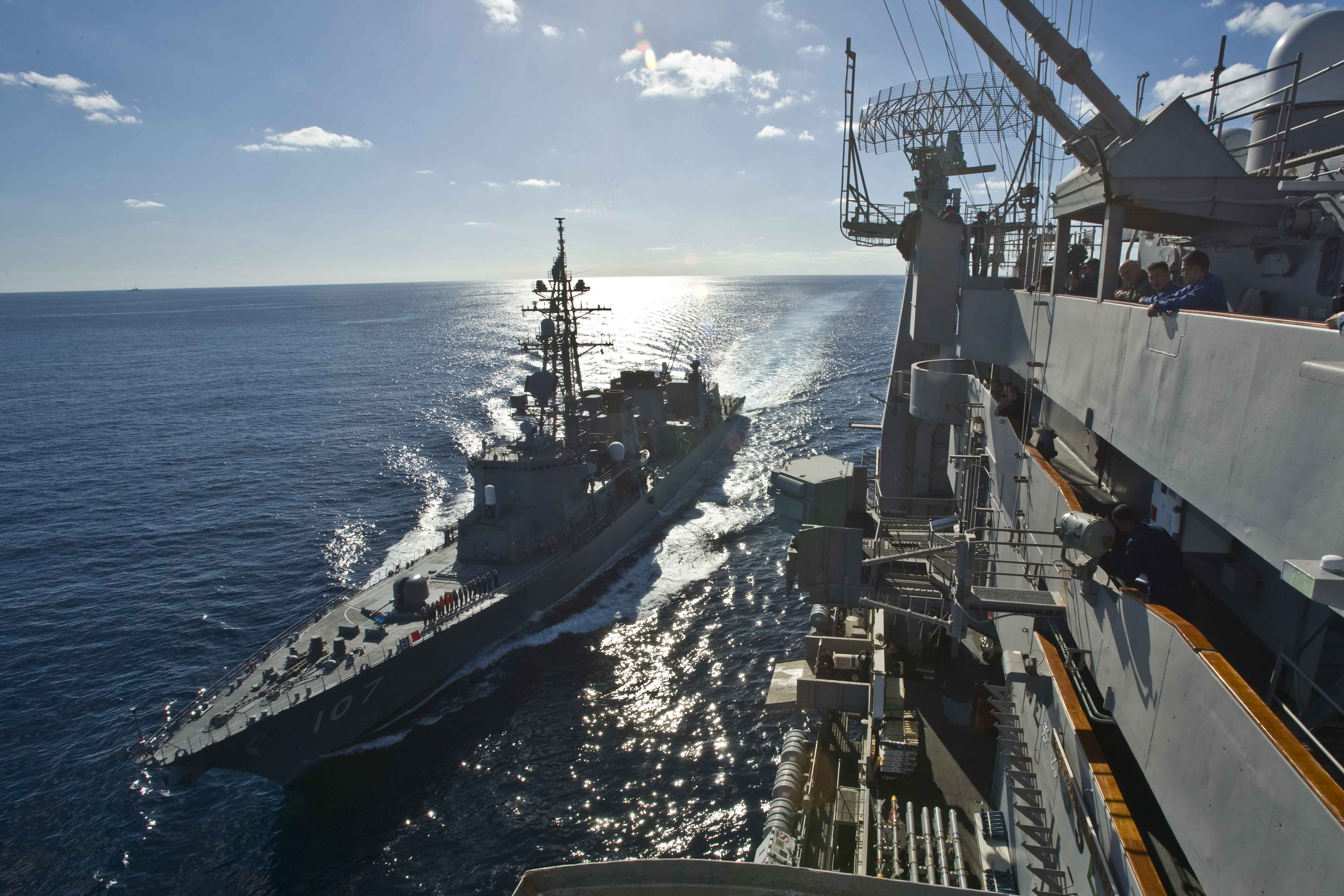
JS Ikazuchi alongside the aircraft carrier USS George Washington on 5 December 2010.

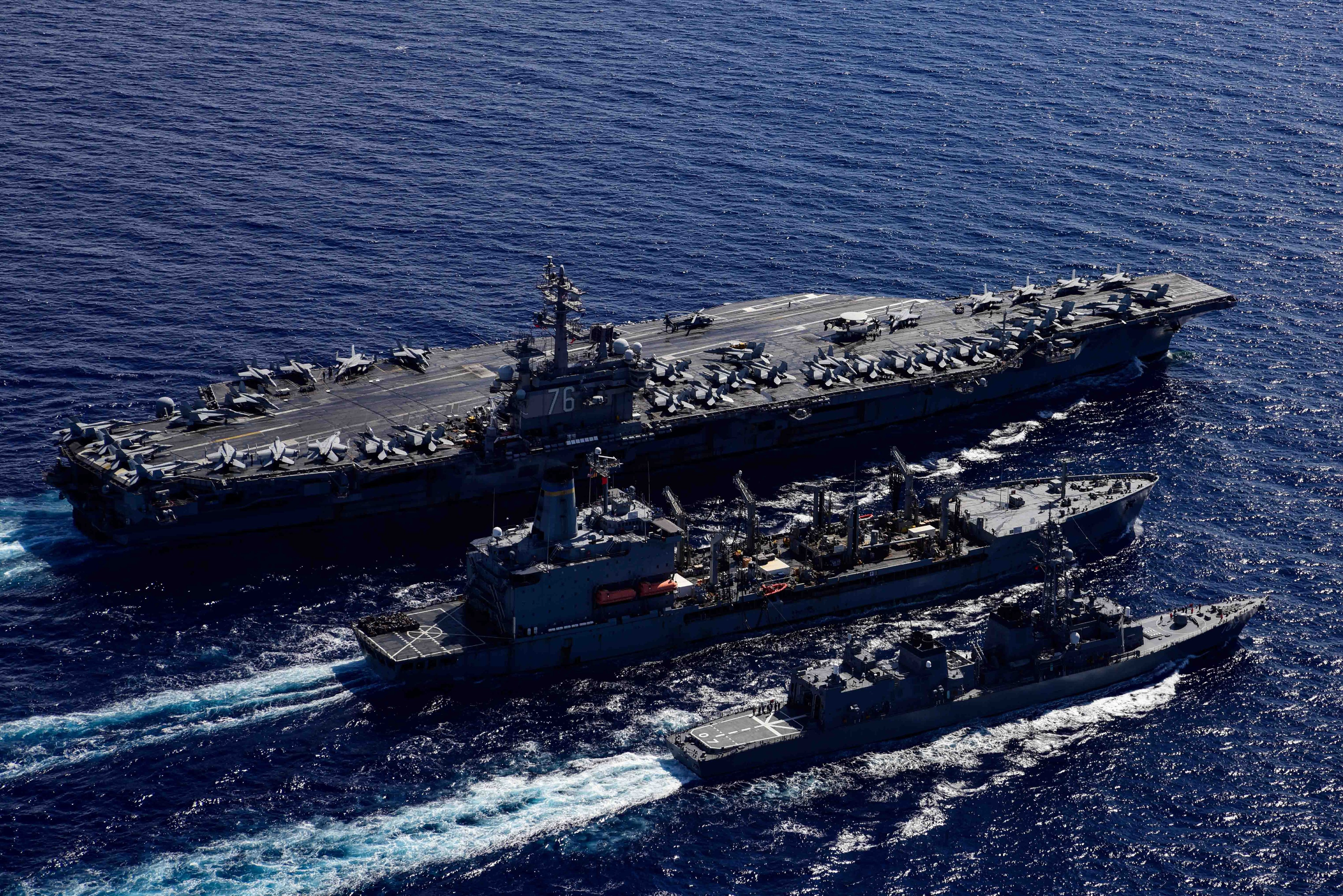
JS Ikazuchi, USNS John Ericsson and USS Ronald Reagan on 16 August 2020.

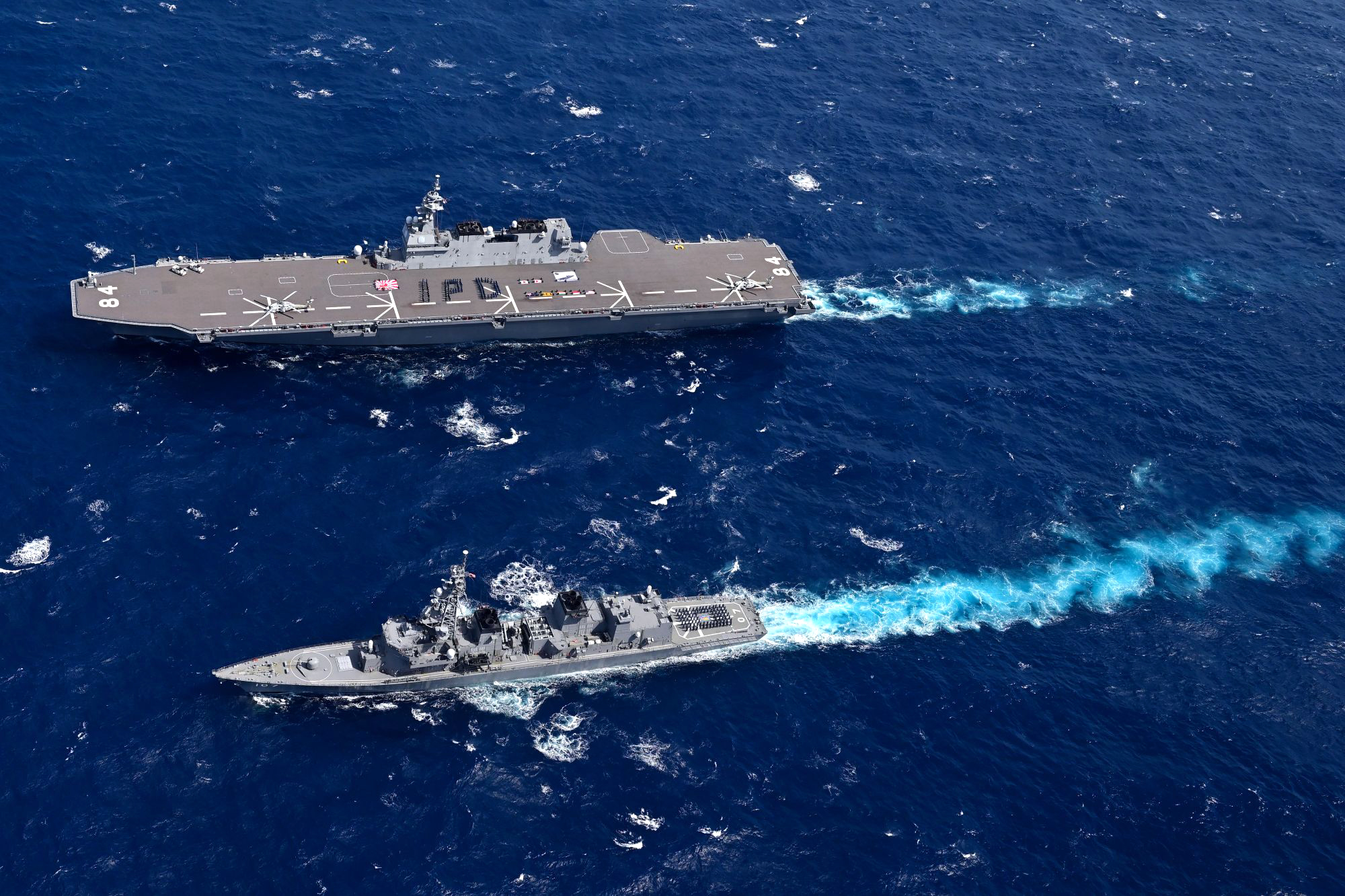
JS Ikazuchi sails with JS Kaga, 15 October 2020.

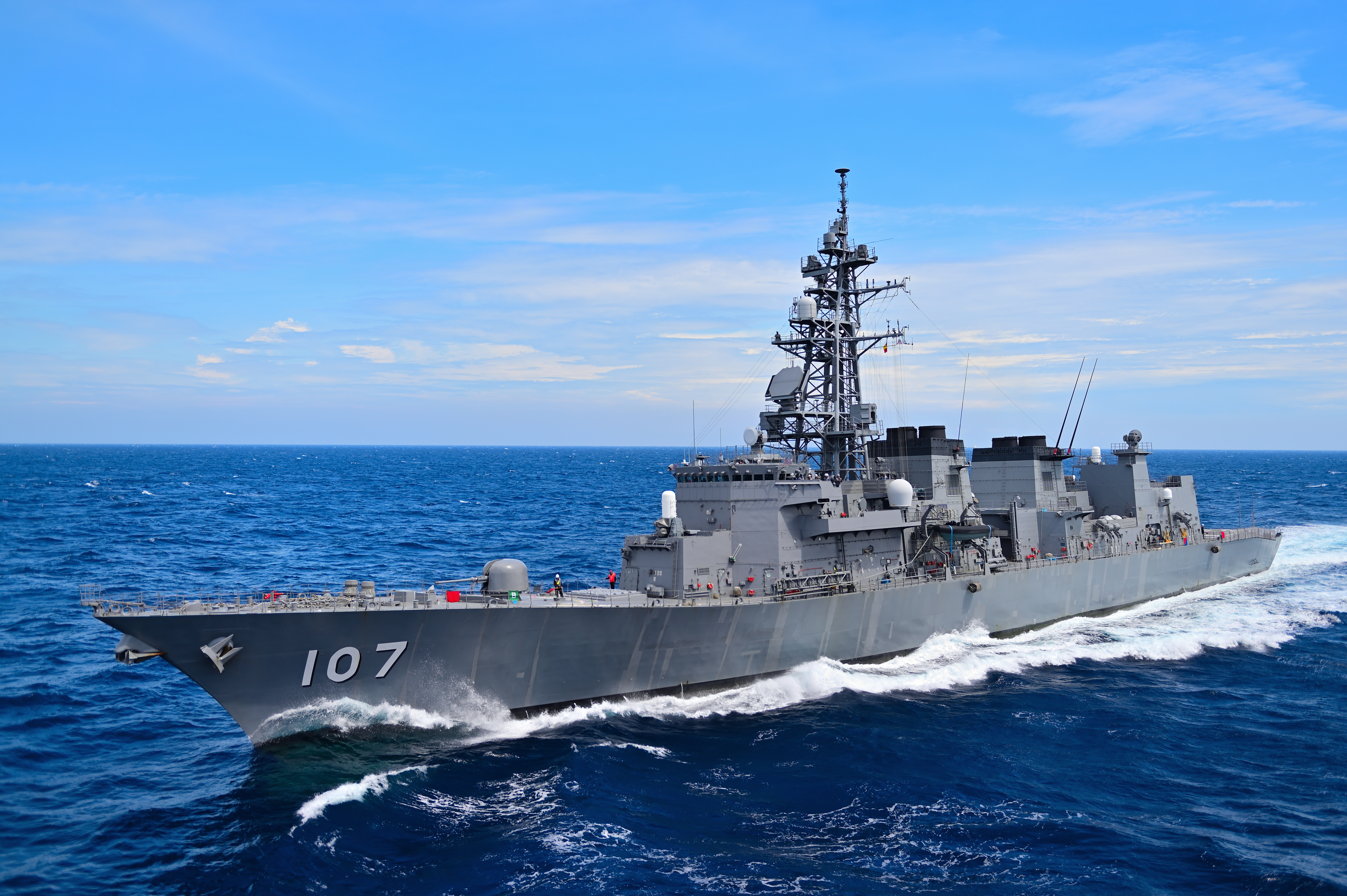
JS Ikazuchi, 18 April 2021.

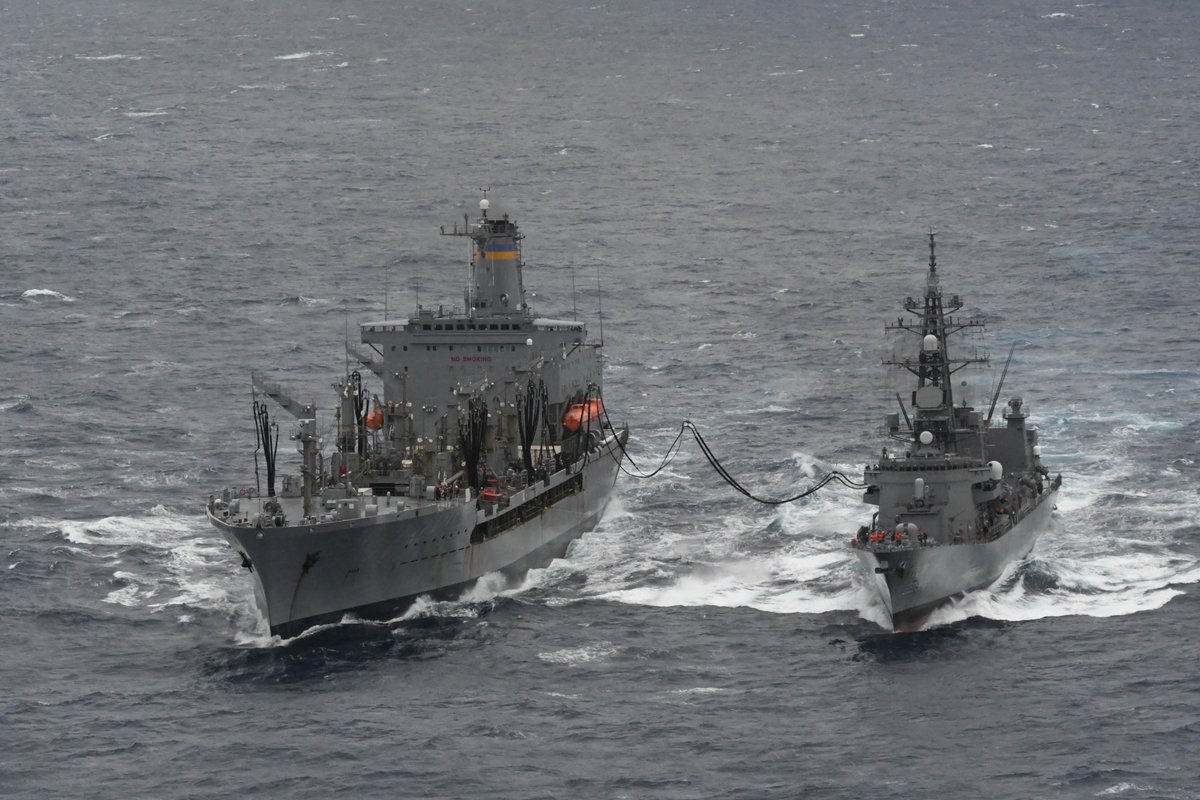
JS Ikazuchi doing underway replenishment with USNS John Ericsson, 9 December 2022.
