= JS Murasame =

Destroyer of the Japan Maritime Self-Defense Force

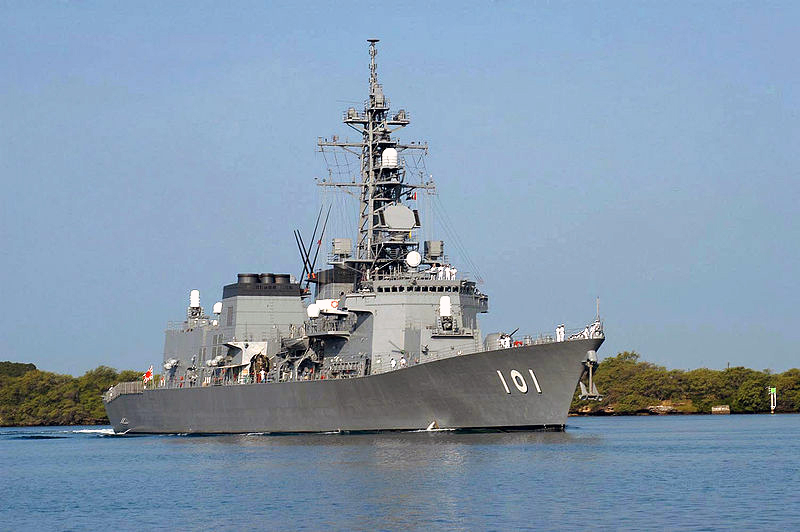
- JS Murasame at Pearl Harbor in 2006

History

Japan
- Name: Murasame; (むらさめ)
- Ordered: 1991
- Builder: IHI Marine United
- Laid down: 18 August 1993
- Launched: 23 August 1994
- Commissioned: 12 March 1996
- Home port: Yokosuka
- Identification: MMSI number: 431999532; Pennant number: DD-101
- Status: Active

General characteristics
- Class & type: Murasame-class destroyer
- Displacement: 4,550 long tons (4,623 t) standard 6,100 long tons (6,198 t) full load
- Length: 151 m (495 ft)
- Beam: 17.4 m (57 ft 1 in)
- Draft: 5.2 m (17 ft 1 in)
- Propulsion: 2 × Ishikawajima Harima LM-2500 gas turbines; 2 × Kawasaki Rolls-Royce Spey SM1C gas turbines 60,000 shp (45 MW); 2 shafts
- Speed: 30 knots (56 km/h; 35 mph)
- Complement: 165
- Sensors & processing systems: OPS-25B Radar; OPS-28D Surface Search Radar; OPS-20 Navigational Radar; OQS-5 Sonar; OQR-2 Towed Sonar; Type 81 Fire Control System
- Electronic warfare & decoys: NOLQ-3 ECM system; Mark 36 SRBOC Chaff Dispensers; AN/SLQ-25 Nixie
- Armament: 1 × 76 mm 62cal rapid fire gun (OTO Melara 3); 2 × missile canister up to 8 Type 90 (SSM-1B); 2 × 20 mm Phalanx CIWS; 2 × Type 68 triple torpedo tubes; VLS Mk 48 (16 cells); • Evolved Sea Sparrow SAM; VLS Mk 41 (16 cells); • RUM-139 VL ASROC
- Aircraft carried: 1 × SH-60J(K) anti-submarine helicopter

JS Murasame (むらさめ) is the lead vessel of the Murasame-class destroyers of the Japan Maritime Self-Defense Force (JMSDF).

JS Murasame was authorized under the Medium-term Defense Buildup Plan of 1991, and was built by IHI Marine United shipyards in Tokyo. She was laid down on 18 August 1993, launched on 23 August 1994. She was commissioned into service on 12 March 1996. and was assigned to the JMSDF Escort Flotilla 1 based at Yokosuka.

== Design ==
The hull design was completely renovated from first-generation destroyers. In addition to increasing the size in order to reduce the underwater radiation noise, both the superstructure and hull were inclined to reduce the radar cross-section. However, there is no angled tripod mainmast like that of the American Arleigh Burke-class destroyer because of the heavy weather of the Sea of Japan in winter. The aft was designed like a "mini-Oranda-zaka" as with the Kongō class to avoid interference between helicopters and mooring devices. Destroyers built under the First Defense Build-up Plan, including the former Murasame class, adopted a unique long forecastle style called "Oranda-zaka".

The engine arrangement is COGAG like in the Asagiri class, but a pair of engines were updated to Spey SM1C. The remaining pair were replaced by LM2500, same as in the Kongō class.

== Service ==
Murasame was a participant in the 1998, 2000 and 2003 RIMPAC naval exercises. On 13 October 2002 she also served as the lead ship in the international naval review celebrating the 50th anniversary of the establishment of the Japan Maritime Self-Defense Force. Murasame was dispatched on 16 February 2004, along with the transport Osumi, as part of the supporting force for the Japanese Iraq Reconstruction and Support Group. In 2005, Murasame participated in the international naval review celebrating the 200th anniversary of the Battle of Trafalgar.

On 24 January 2008, together with the fleet oiler Oume, Murasame was sent to the Indian Ocean to provide refueling and logistics support for Allied forces in Operation Enduring Freedom. She arrived on station on 21 February, and returned to Yokosuka on 4 June. On 10 May 2010, Murasame, along with the destroyer Yūgiri, was dispatched to the coast of Somalia to participate in anti-piracy escort operations. From 5 June to 16 September she undertook 34 sorties, and returned to Japan on 15 October 2010.

On 21 January 2012 Murasame was dispatched to Aden, Yemen together with her sister ship Harusame, to resume anti-piracy escort operations off the coast of Somalia. The context for this extended deployment off the Horn of Africa was the "Law on the Penalization of Acts of Piracy and Measures Against Acts of Piracy (Anti-Piracy Measures Law)". She completed 188 sorties, including a number of joint operations with the Indian Navy and returned to Yokosuka on 5 July 2012. She remains currently assigned to JMSDF Escort Flotilla 1.

JS Murasame made a port call at Kochi, India from 25 to 27 October 2024.

On 22 March 2025, Murasame arrived at the Port of Colombo for a replenishment visit. The vessel departed the island on 25 March 2025.
