= JS Harusame =

Destroyer of the Japan Maritime Self-Defense Force

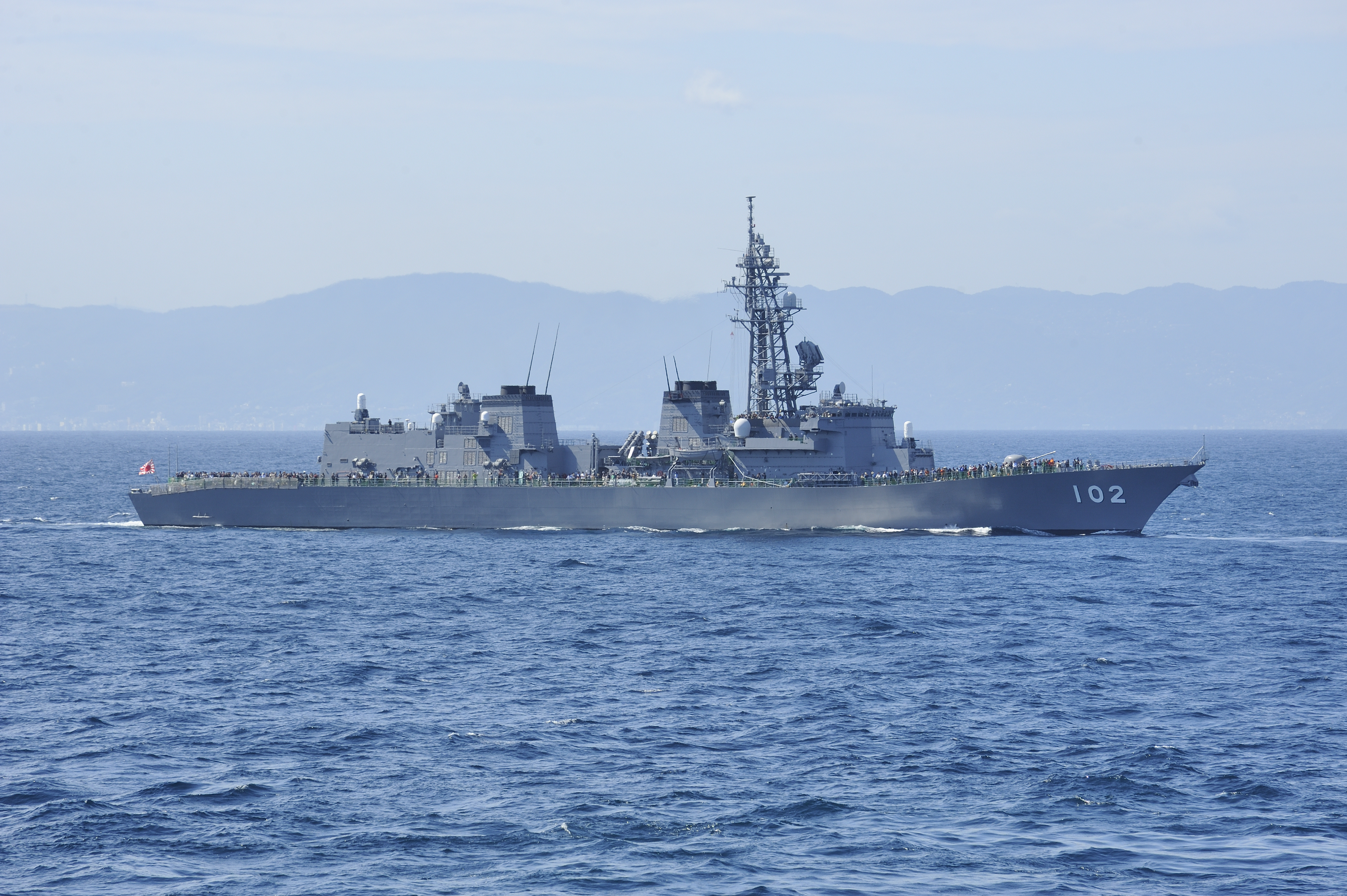
- Harusame in the Sagami Bay, 11 October 2012.

History

Japan
- Name: Harusame; (はるさめ)
- Namesake: Harusame (1959)
- Ordered: 1992
- Builder: Mitsui, Tamano
- Laid down: 11 August 1994
- Launched: 16 October 1995
- Commissioned: 24 March 1997
- Home port: Sasebo
- Identification: MMSI number: 431999535; Pennant number:DD-102
- Status: Active

General characteristics
- Class & type: Murasame-class destroyer
- Displacement: 4,550 tons standard, 6,200 tons hull load
- Length: 151 m (495 ft 5 in)
- Beam: 17.4 m (57 ft 1 in)
- Draft: 5.2 m (17 ft 1 in)
- Propulsion: 2 × IHI-GE LM2500 gas turbines; 2 × KHI-RR SM1C gas turbines; 60,000 shp (45 MW); 2 shafts, cp props
- Speed: 30 knots (56 km/h; 35 mph)
- Complement: 165
- Sensors & processing systems: OYQ-9 CDS (w/ Link-11); OYQ-103 ASWCS; FCS-2-31 fire-control systems; OPS-24B air search radar; OPS-28 surface search radar; OQS-5 hull sonar; OQR-2 TASS
- Electronic warfare & decoys: NOLQ-3 suite; Mk. 36 SRBOC Chaff and Decoy Launching System; AN/SLQ-25 torpedo decoys
- Armament: 1 × OTO Melara 76 mm gun; 2 × 20 mm Phalanx CIWS; 8 × SSM-1B Anti-ship missile in quad canisters; 2 × triple 324 mm torpedo tubes; 16-cell Mk. 48 VLS with Evolved Sea Sparrow SAM; 16-cell Mk. 41 VLS with VL-ASROC
- Aircraft carried: 1 × SH-60J/K anti-submarine helicopter

JS Harusame (DD-102) is the second ship of Murasame-class destroyers. She was commissioned on 24 March 1997.

== Design ==
The hull design was completely renovated from first-generation destroyers. In addition to increasing the size in order to reduce the underwater radiation noise, both superstructure and hull was inclined to reduce the radar cross-section. However, there is no angled tripod mainmast like that of the American Arleigh Burke-class destroyer because of the heavy weather of the Sea of Japan in winter. The aft was designed like a "mini-Oranda-zaka" as with the Kongō class to avoid interference between helicopters and mooring devices. Destroyers built under the First Defense Build-up Plan, including the former Murasame class, adopted a unique long forecastle style called "Oranda-zaka".

The engine arrangement is COGAG as same as Asagiri class, but a pair of engines are updated to Spey SM1C. And the remaining one pair are replaced by LM2500, same as Kongō class.

== Construction and career ==
Harusame was laid down on 11 August 1994 at Mitsui Engineering and Shipbuilding Tamano as the 1992 plan and launched on 16 October 1995. Commissioned on 24 March 1997, the vessel was incorporated into the 8th Escort Corps of the 4th Escort Corps and deployed to Sasebo.

From 17 to 29 September and 15 October to 23 October 2019, Japan-Australia joint training (Japan-Australia Trident) was held in the sea and airspace from the south of Kanto to the west of Kyushu via the area around Okinawa. In addition to Harusame the escort vessels JS Teruzuki, JS Asahi, JS Atago, the supply ship JS Mashū and P-1 patrol aircraft or P-3C patrol aircraft and submarines, and ships from the Royal Australian Navy participated. On 24 November, the same year, she departed from Sasebo for the Gulf of Aden off the coast of Somalia as the 35th Expeditionary Piracy Action Water Corps. Due to the fact that some members of the ship completed their mission in late May 2020 and developed symptoms of suspected acute cholecystitis or acute cholangitis on their way back to Japan, they planned to return to Japan on 20 June, one day earlier. The vessel returned to port on 19 June.

On 22 May 2022, Harusame departed Sasebo for the Gulf of Aden as the 42nd Deployment Surface for Counter Piracy Enforcement. The vessel relieved JS Samidare.

== Bibliography ==
- Abe, Yasuo (July 2000). "History of JMSDF Destroyers". Ships of the World (in Japanese) (571). Kaijinn-sha. NAID 40002155847.
- Saunders, Stephen. IHS Jane's Fighting Ships 2013-2014. Jane's Information Group (2003). ISBN 0710630484
- Heihachiro Fujiki (August 2003). "Development of multi-purpose DDs for "8-8 escort flotilla". Ships of the World (in Japanese) (614). Kaijinn-sha: 94–99.
