= Murasame-class destroyer (1994) =

Destroyer class in the Japanese Maritime Self-Defense Forces

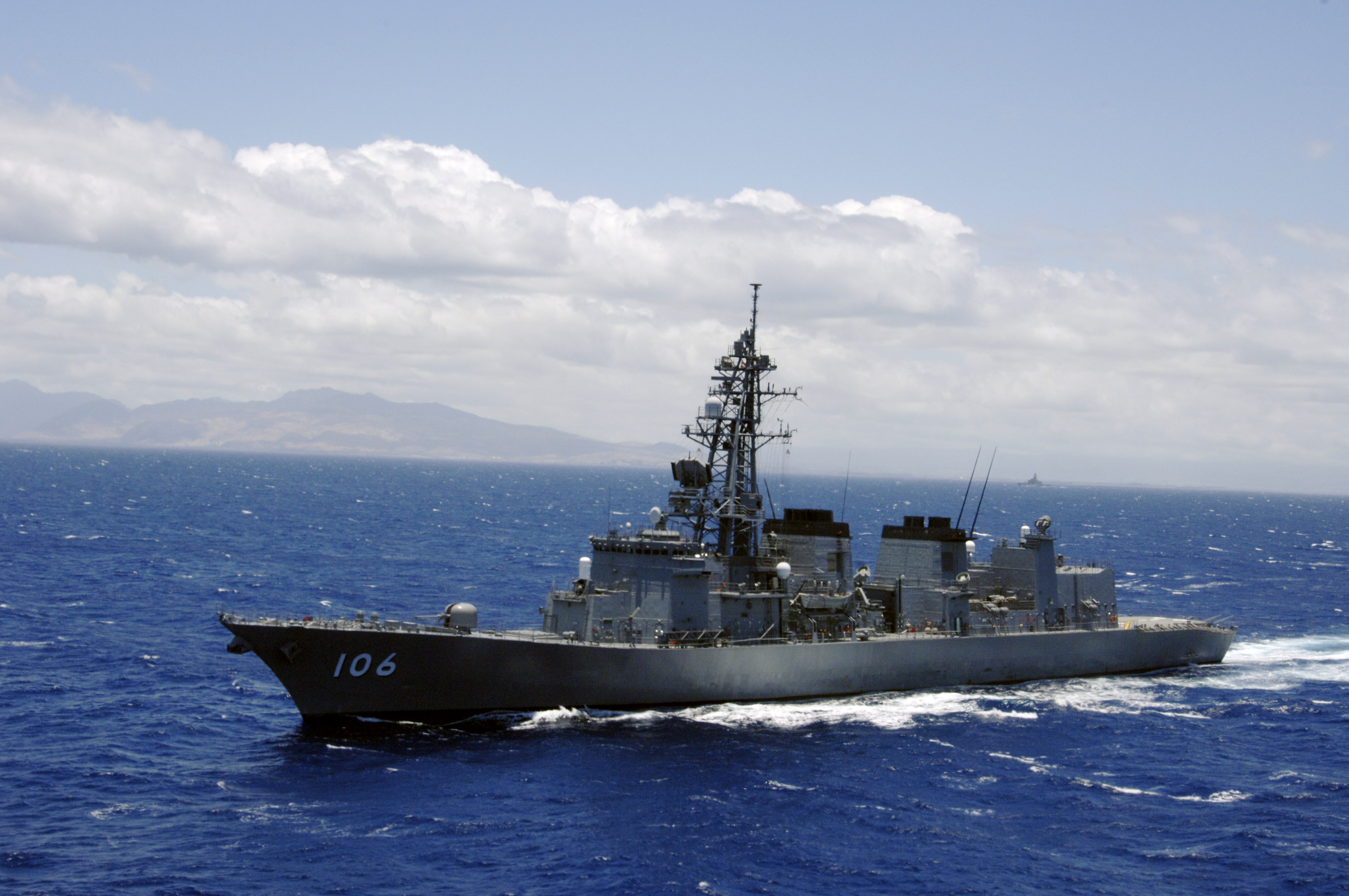
- JS Samidare in Pearl Harbor

Class overview
- Name: Murasame class
- Builders: Ishikawajima-Harima HI; Tokyo #1 Shipyard (3); Mitsubishi Heavy Industries; Nagasaki Shipyard (3); Hitachi Zōsen; Maizuru Shipyard (1); Mitsui Shipbuilding; Tamano Shipyard (1); Sumitomo Heavy Industries; Oppama Shipyard (1)
- Operators: Japan Maritime Self-Defense Force
- Preceded by: Asagiri class
- Succeeded by: Takanami class
- Built: 1993–2000
- In commission: 1996–present
- Planned: 14
- Completed: 9
- Cancelled: 5
- Active: 9

General characteristics
- Type: General-purpose destroyer
- Displacement: 4,550 tons standard, 6,200 tons full load
- Length: 151 m (495 ft 5 in)
- Beam: 17.4 m (57 ft 1 in)
- Draft: 5.2 m (17 ft 1 in)
- Propulsion: 2 × IHI-GE LM2500 gas turbines; 2 × KHI-RR SM1C gas turbines; 60,000 shp (45 MW); 2 shafts, cp props
- Speed: 30 knots (35 mph; 56 km/h)
- Complement: 165
- Sensors & processing systems: OYQ-9 CDS (w/ Link-11); OYQ-103 ASWCS; FCS-2-31 fire-control systems; OPS-24B air search radar; OPS-28 surface search radar; OQS-5 hull sonar; OQR-2 TASS
- Electronic warfare & decoys: NOLQ-3 suite; Mk 36 SRBOC Chaff and Decoy Launching System; AN/SLQ-25 torpedo decoys
- Armament: 1 × OTO Melara 76 mm gun; 2 × 20 mm Phalanx CIWS; 8 × Type-90 SSM-1B Anti-ship missile in quad canisters; 2 × triple 324 mm torpedo tubes; 16-cell Mk 48 VLS with Evolved Sea Sparrow SAM; 16-cell Mk 41 VLS with VL-ASROC
- Aircraft carried: 1 × SH-60J/K anti-submarine helicopter

The Murasame-class destroyer (むらさめ型護衛艦, Murasame-gata-goei-kan) is a class of destroyers serving with the Japan Maritime Self-Defense Force (JMSDF). This is the first class of the second-generation, general-purpose destroyers of the JMSDF.

== Background ==
Since fiscal year 1977, the JMSDF started construction of general-purpose destroyers (汎用護衛艦, Hanyou-goei-kan) under the eight ships / eight helicopters concept. In this concept, each flotilla would be composed of one helicopter destroyer (DDH), five general-purpose destroyers (DD), and two guided-missile destroyers (DDG). By fiscal year 1986, construction of twenty first-generation DDs (twelve Hatsuyuki class and eight Asagiri class) required for all four flotillas had been completed.

In the original plan, construction was supposed to shift to destroyer escorts, for local District Forces, afterwards. However, if the use of these first-generation DDs was continued to the full extent of the ship's lives, obsolescence was a concern. Thus the JMSDF decided to advance the construction of the new generation DDs, and this was the first class of the second-generation DDs.

Except for Kirisame, all ships of the class are named after Imperial Japanese Navy destroyers in World War II.

== Design ==
The hull design was completely renovated from first-generation DDs. In addition to increasing the size in order to reduce the underwater radiation noise, both superstructure and hull were inclined to reduce the radar cross-section. There is, however, no angled tripod mainmast like the one on the American Arleigh Burke-class destroyer because of the heavy weather of the Sea of Japan in winter. The aft was designed like a "mini-Oranda-zaka" as with the Kongō class to avoid interference between helicopters and mooring devices. (Note: Destroyers built under the First Defense Build-up Plan, including the former Murasame class, adopted a unique, long-forecastle style called "Oranda-zaka".)

The engine arrangement is COGAG, same as the Asagiri-class, but the pair of engines are updated to Spey SM1C. The remaining one pair are replaced by LM2500, same as the Kongō-class.

== Equipment ==
The basic configuration of the equipment is the same as first-generation DDs, but they are updated and enhanced throughout. Concepts of its combat system were partly based on those of Kongō class. Two large-screen displays and OJ-663 consoles are introduced in its OYQ-9 combat direction system as Aegis Weapon System (AWS). And OYQ-103 ASW combat systems, based on OYQ-102 of Kongō class and indirectly AN/SQQ-89, present an integrated picture of the tactical situation by receiving, combining, and processing active and passive sensor data from the hull-mounted array, towed array and sonobuoys.

The advanced OPS-24 active electronically scanned array radar and OPS-28 surface search and target acquisition radar introduced into the fleet with the latter batch of the Asagiri class remain on board, and there are some new systems like the NOLQ-3 electronic warfare suite and OQS-5 bow-mounted sonar.

To enhance the low-observability and combat readiness capability, vertical launching systems were adopted on its missile systems: Mk 41 for VL-ASROC and Mk 48 for Sea Sparrow replace the traditional swivel octuple launchers. And the surface-to-surface missile system is alternated by the SSM-1B of Japanese make. Currently, ships of this class have been switching the point defense missile system from the traditional Sea Sparrow (RIM-7M) to the Evolved Sea Sparrow by FY2012.

The aircraft facility is expanded to accommodate two shipboard helicopters. One Mitsubishi SH-60J/K is a basic load, and another can be accommodated in case of overseas operation.

== Ships in the class ==
Pennant no.	Name	Laid down	Launched	Commissioned	Homeport
DD-101	Murasame (Village Rain)	18 August 1993	23 August 1994	12 March 1996	Yokosuka
DD-102	Harusame (Spring Rain)	11 August 1994	16 October 1995	24 March 1997	Sasebo
DD-103	Yūdachi (Evening Downpour)	18 March 1996	19 August 1997	4 March 1999	Ominato
DD-104	Kirisame (Drizzle)	3 April 1996	21 August 1997	18 March 1999	Headquarters: Kure; Home port: Sasebo
DD-105	Inazuma (Sudden Lightning)	8 May 1997	9 September 1998	15 March 2000	Kure
DD-106	Samidare (Poetic term for the Rainy Season)	11 September 1997	24 September 1998	21 March 2000	Kure
DD-107	Ikazuchi (Ferocious Thunder)	25 February 1998	24 June 1999	14 March 2001	Yokosuka
DD-108	Akebono (Light of Daybreak)	29 October 1999	25 September 2000	19 March 2002	Kure
DD-109	Ariake (Daybreak)	18 May 1999	16 October 2000	6 March 2002	Sasebo

== Gallery ==
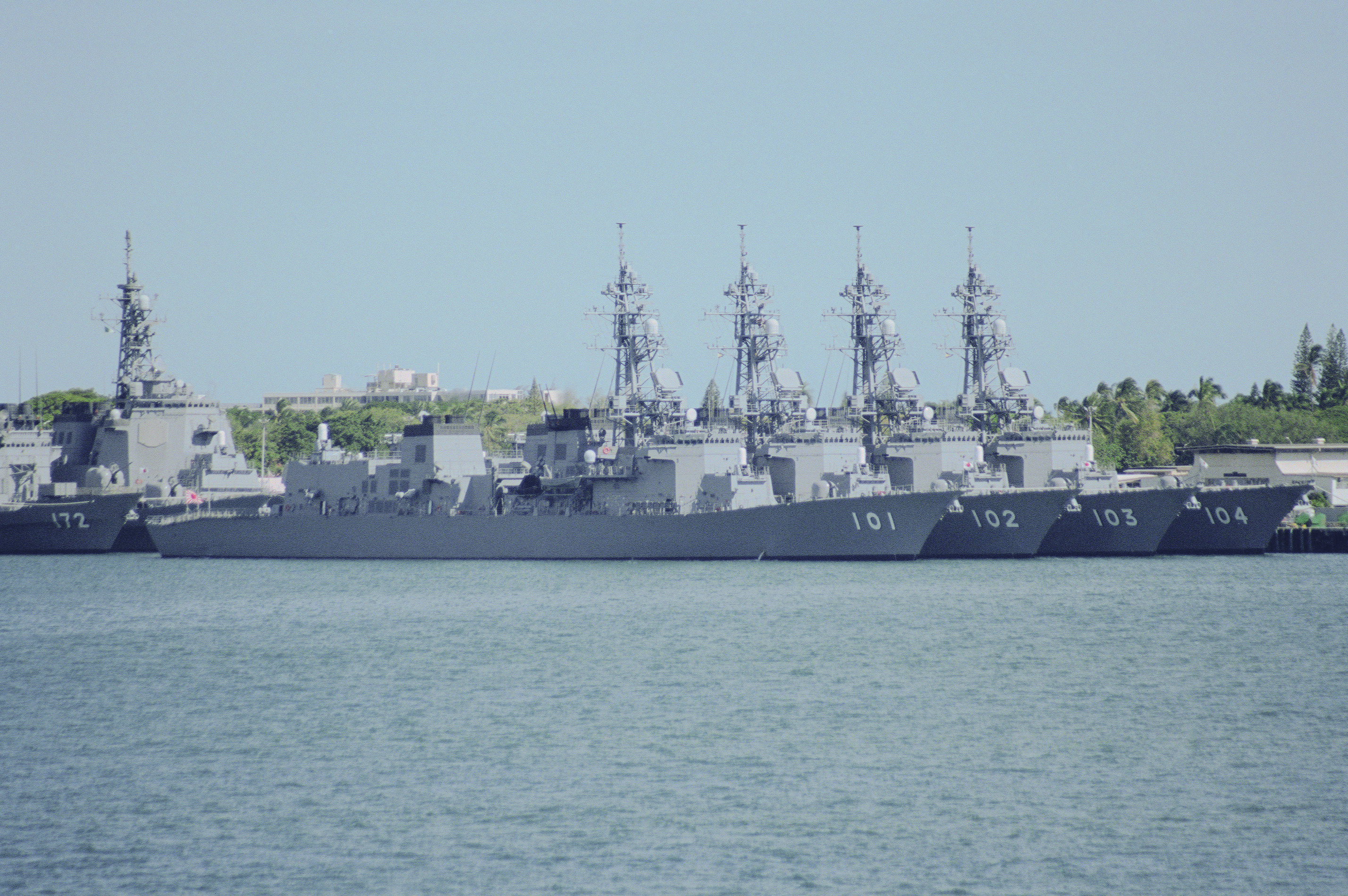
JS Murasame, JS Harusame, JS Yudachi and JS Kirisame in Pearl Harbor

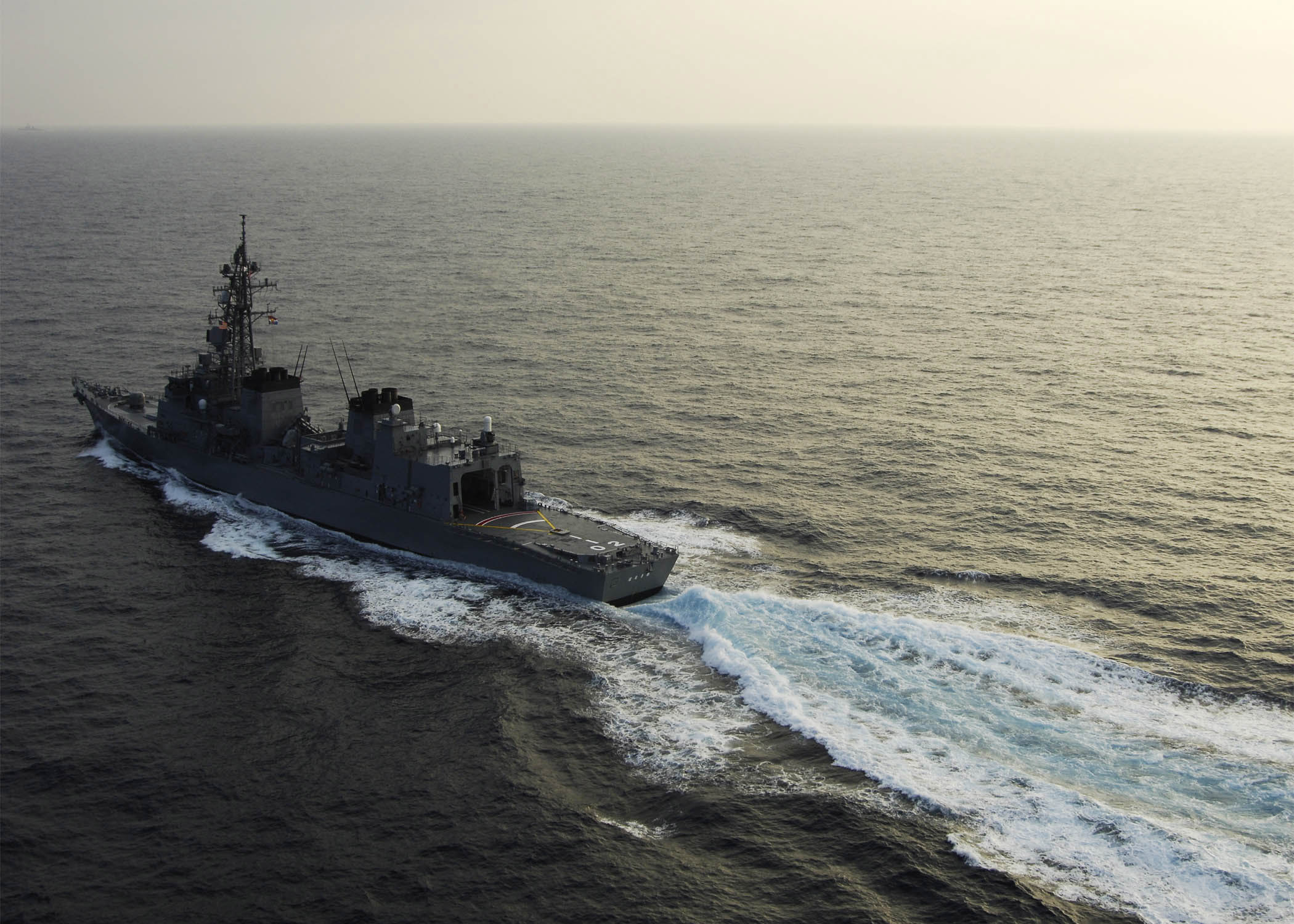
JS Harusame

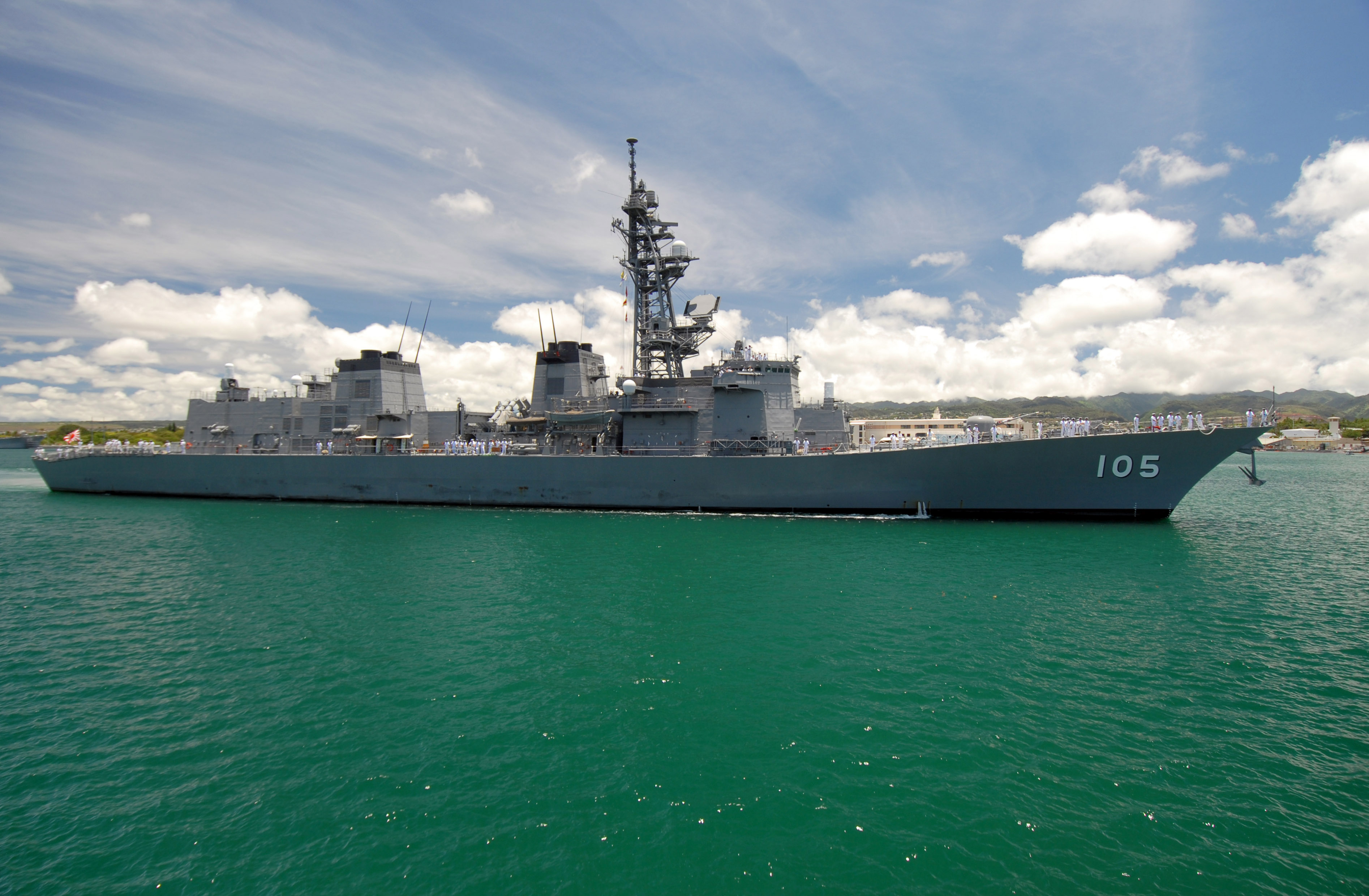
JS Inazuma

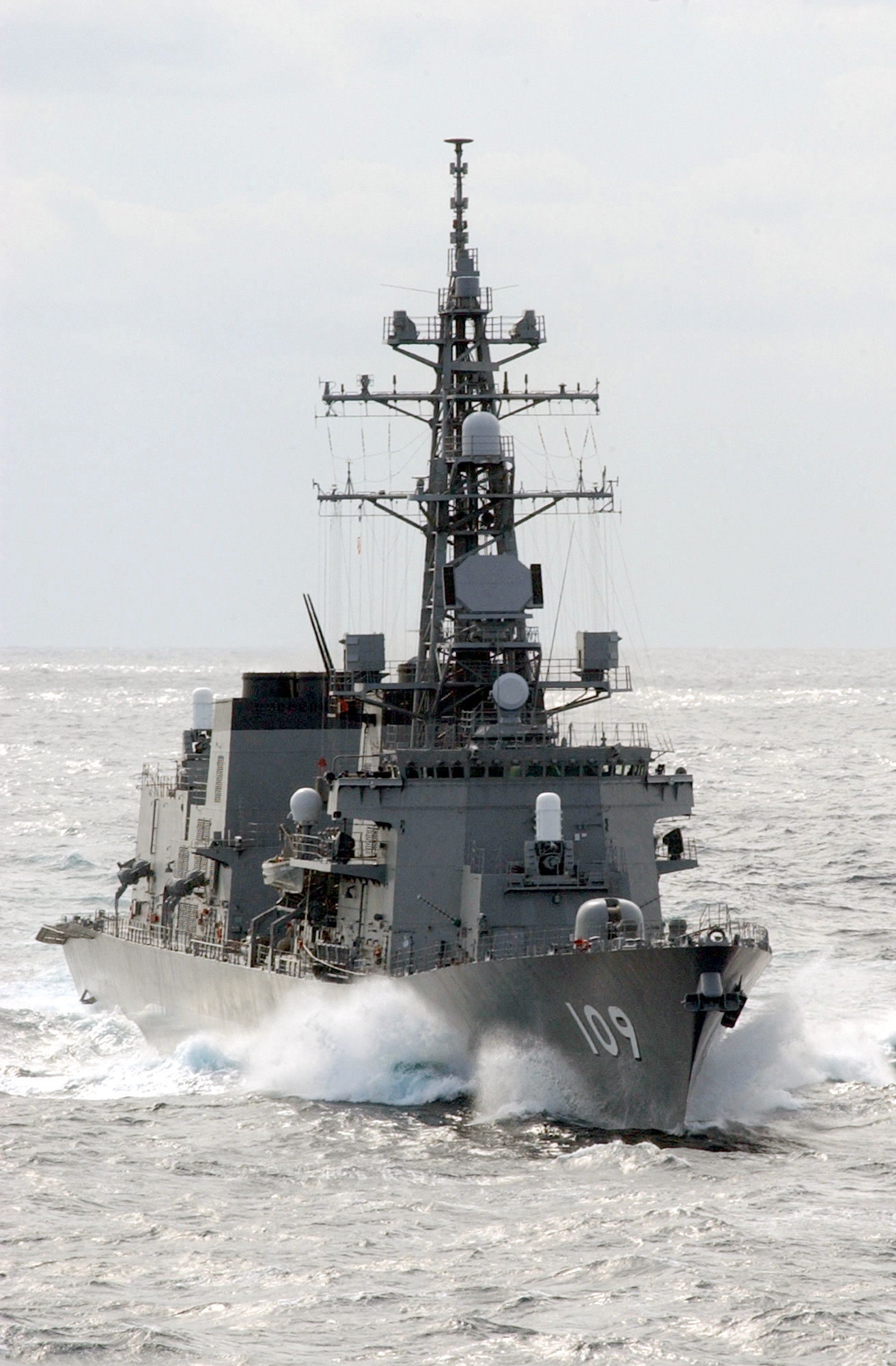
JS Ariake

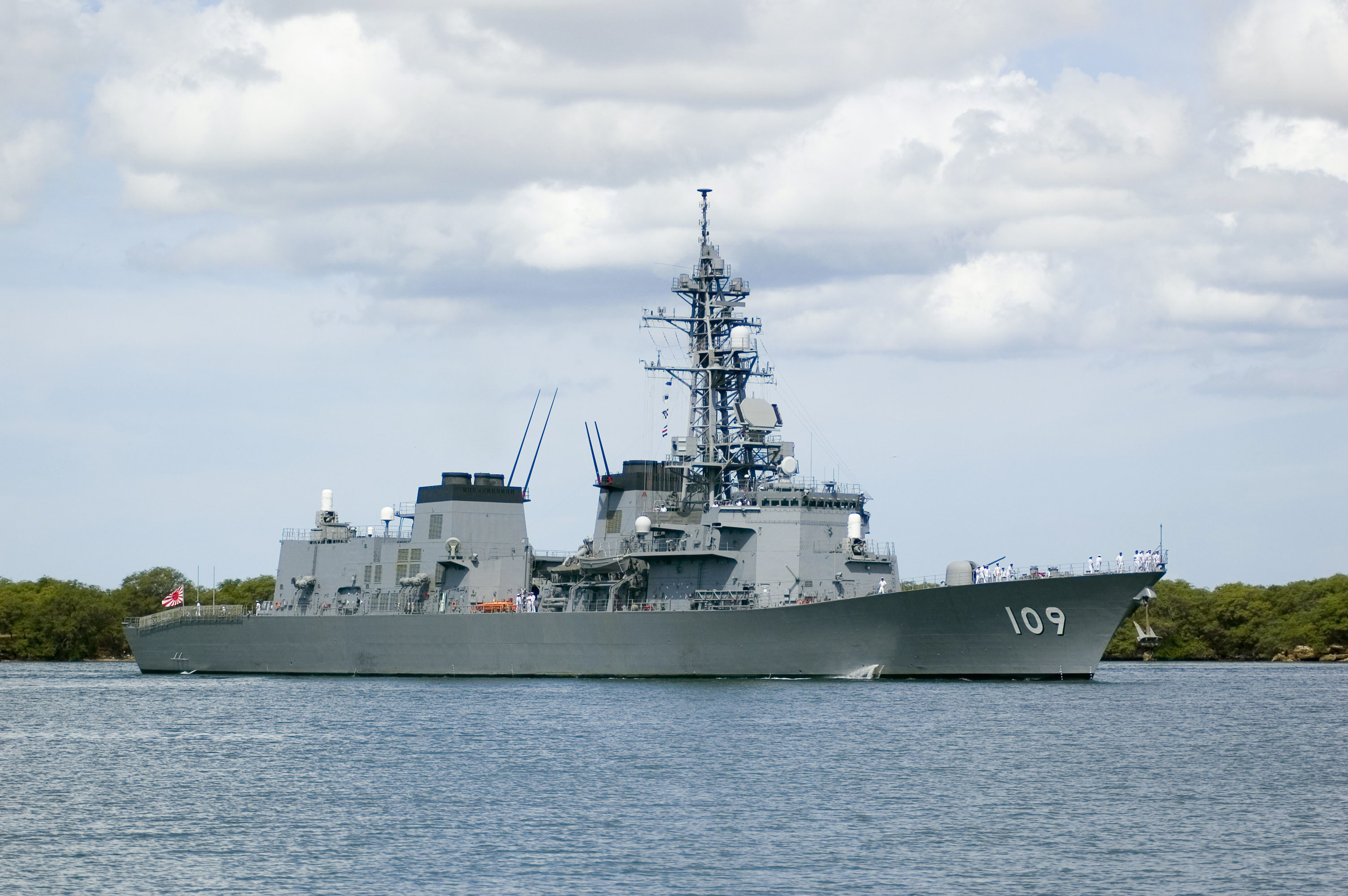
JS Ariake

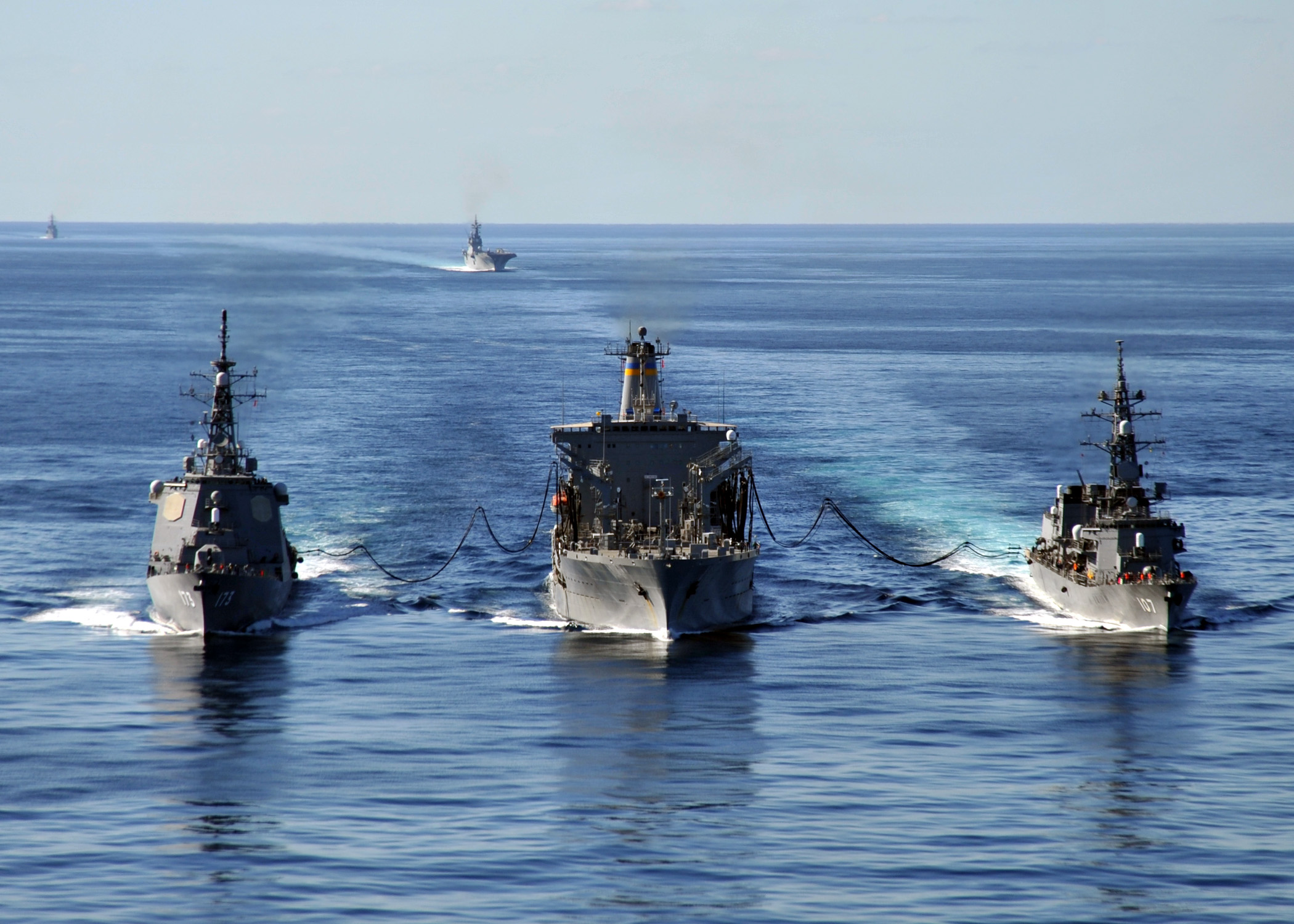
JS Ikazuchi

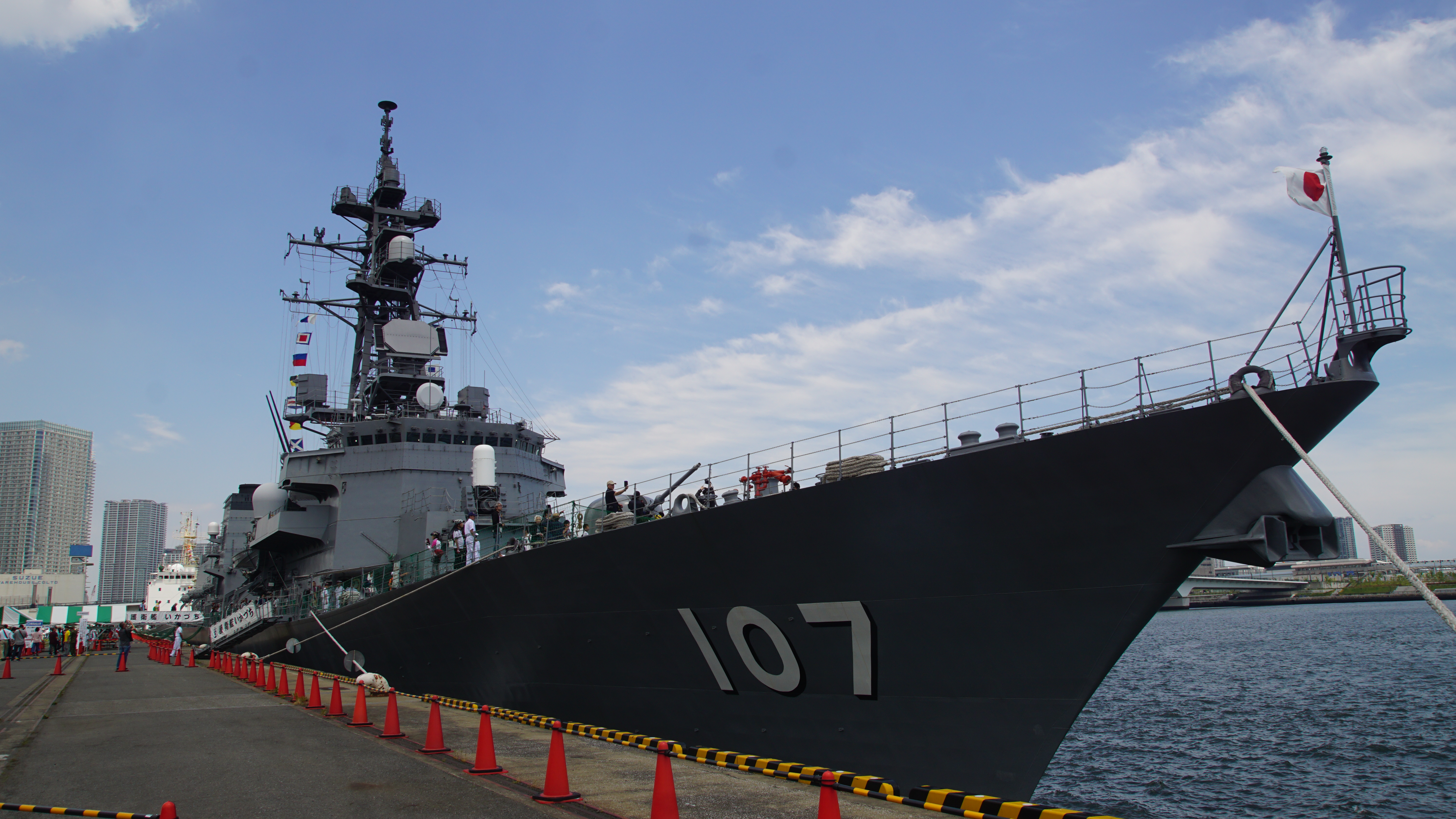
JS Ikazuchi

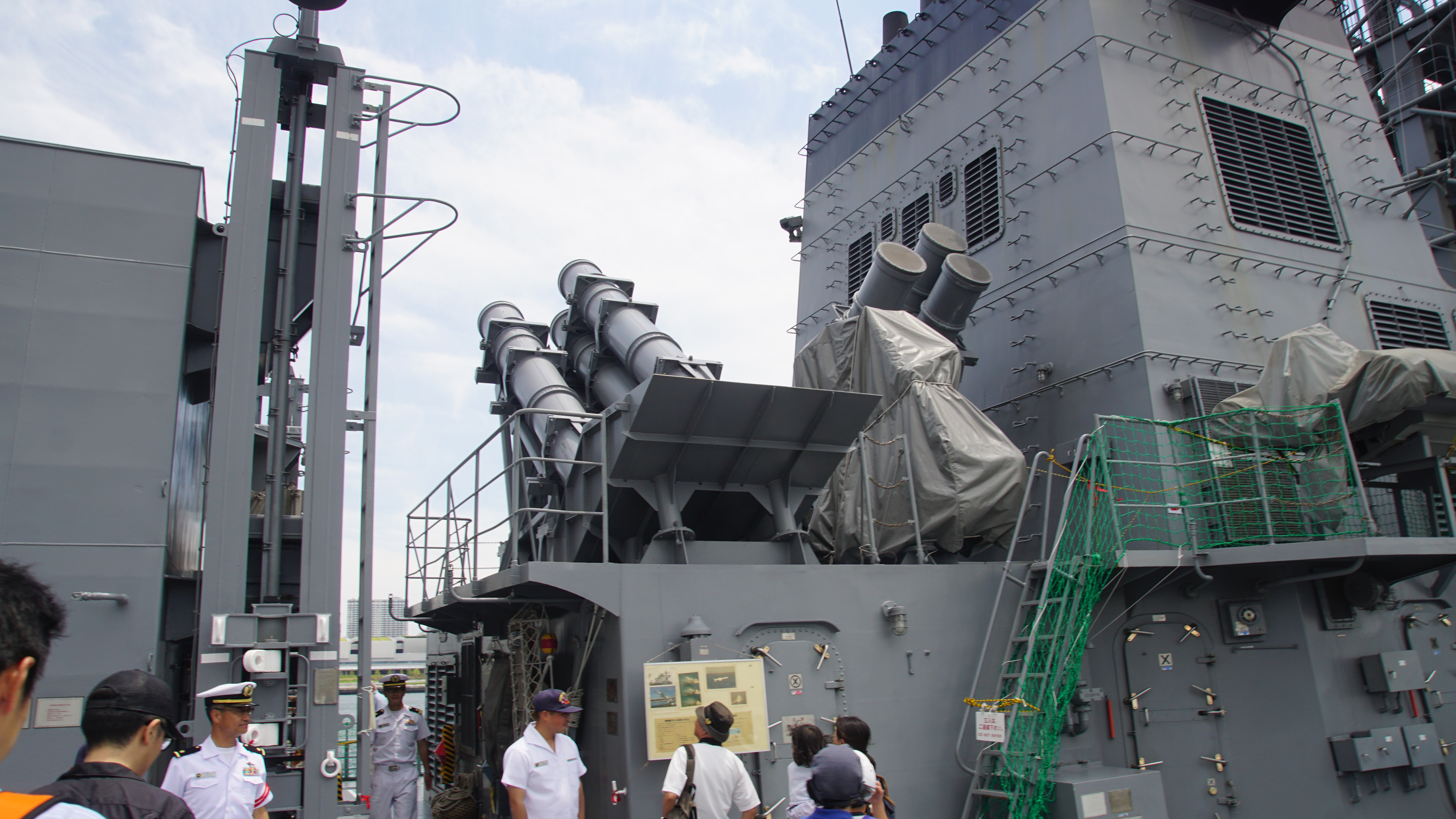
Type 90 (SSM-1B) launcher of Murasame class

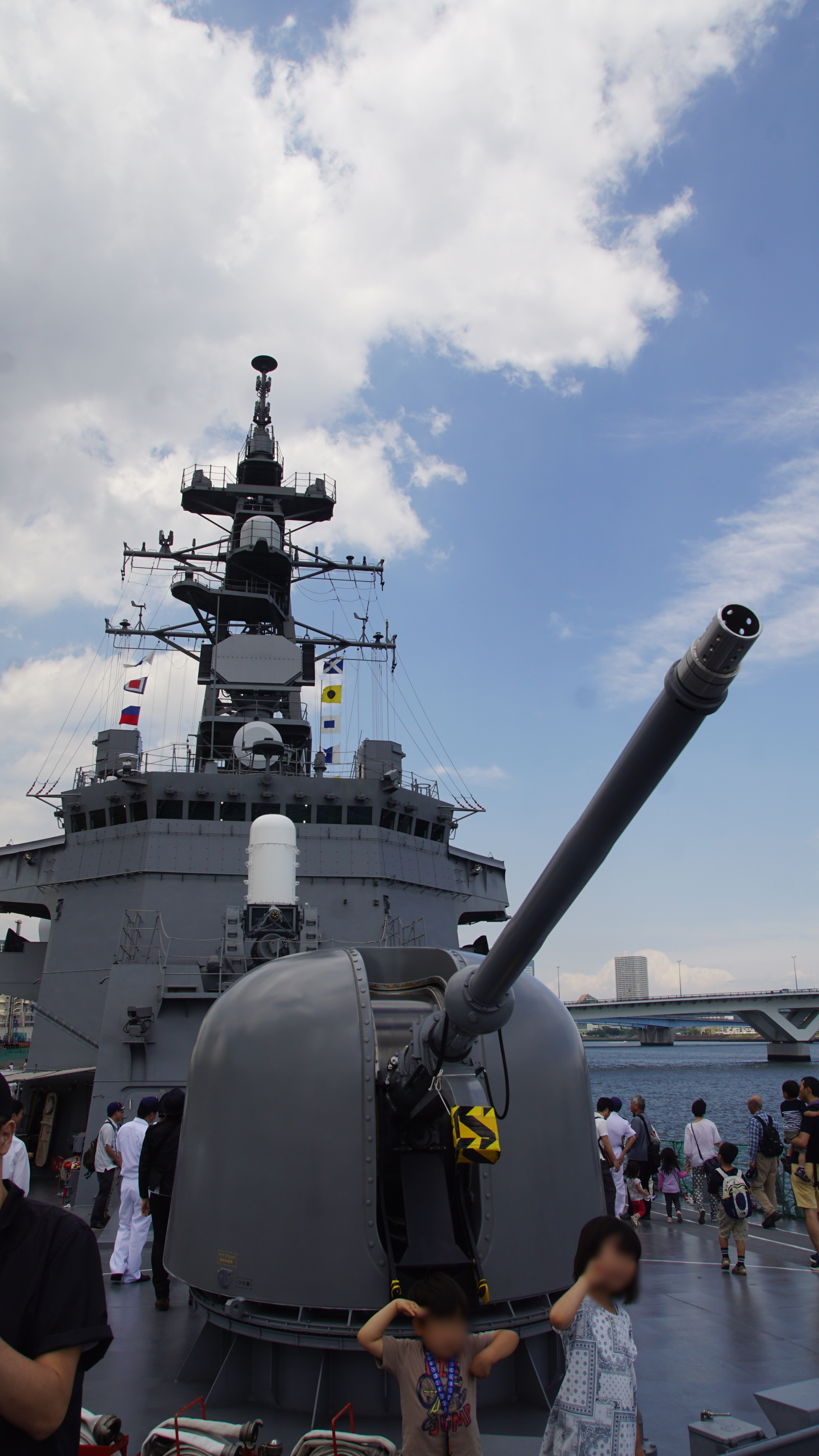
76 mm 62 cal compact gun

== See also ==
- List of destroyer classes in service

Equivalent destroyers of the same era

- Delhi class
- Gwanggaeto the Great class
- Type 051B
