= OPS-24 =

Shipborne 3D air search AESA radar

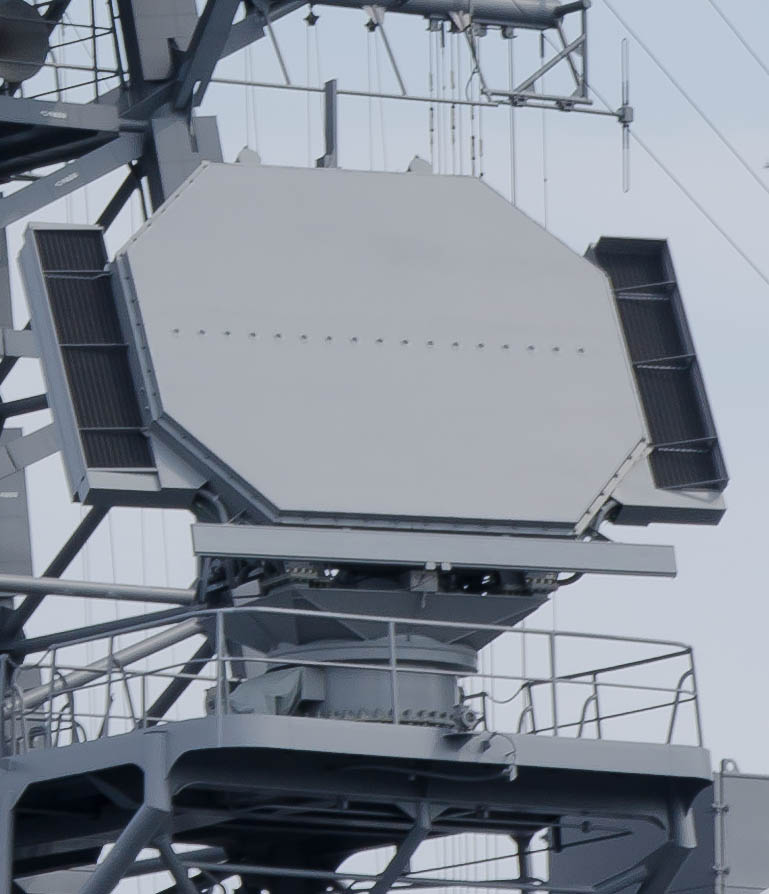
- OPS-24 on JS Ariake (DD-109)
- Country of origin: Japan
- Introduced: 1990
- Type: 3D Air-search
- Frequency: L band
- Azimuth: 0-360°

The OPS-24 is a shipborne three-dimensional air search radar adopting active electronically scanned array (AESA) technology.

OPS-24 was developed by the Technical Research and Development Institute (TRDI) of the Ministry of Defence, and manufactured by Mitsubishi Electric. It is the first AESA radar employed on an operational warship, introduced on the JDS Hamagiri (DD-155), the first ship of the latter batch of the Asagiri-class destroyer, launched in 1988. It is also being used on the Murasame and Takanami-class destroyers.
