= Oranda-zaka =

Scenic street in Nagasaki City, Japan

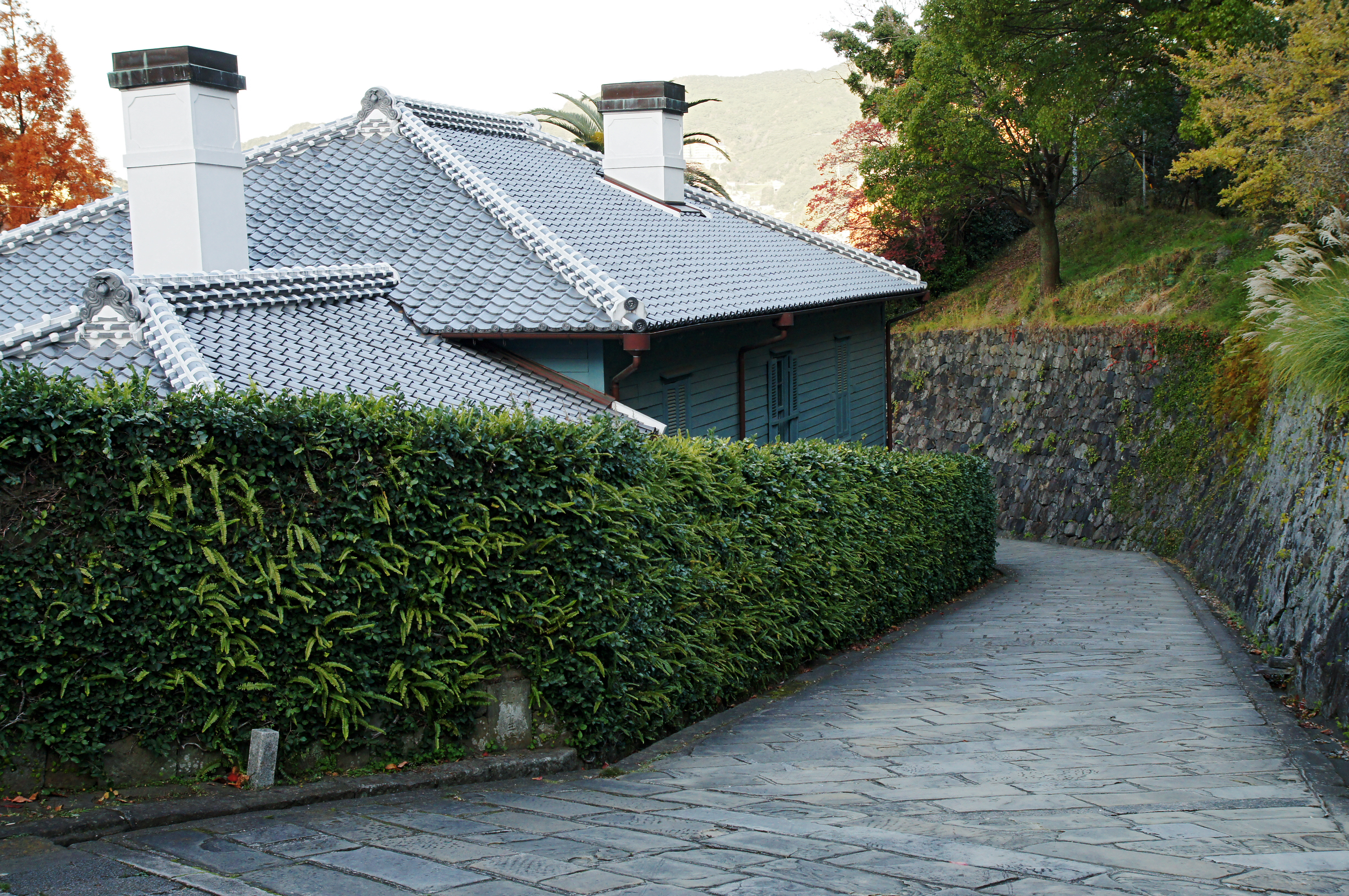
Oranda-zaka

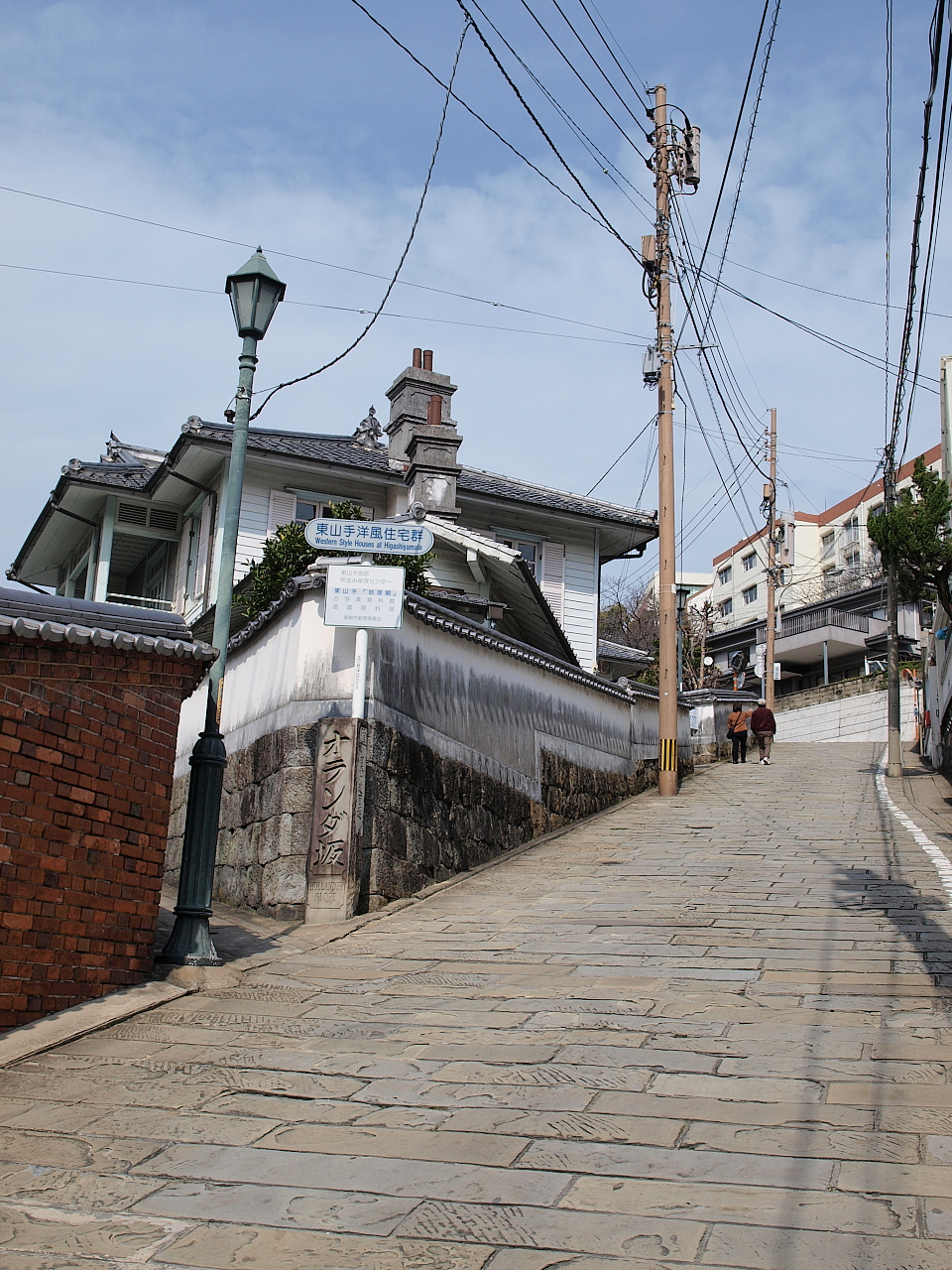
Western style houses at Higashiyamate

Oranda-zaka (オランダ坂), also known as the Dutch Slope or Hollander Slope, is a scenic sloping street in the Higashiyamate area of Nagasaki City, Nagasaki Prefecture, Japan. Its name is derived from the numerous western, notably Dutch merchants that settled in the area in the second half of the 19th century.
