= List of ship launches in 2001 =

The list of ship launches in 2001 includes a chronological list of all ships launched in 2001.

Date	Ship	Class / type	Builder	Location	Country	Notes
5 January	Frankfurt am Main	Berlin-class replenishment ship	Flensburger Schiffbau-Gesellschaft	Flensburg	Germany	For German Navy
5 January	Adventure of the Seas	Voyager-class cruise ship	Kvaerner Masa-Yards Turku New Shipyard	Turku	Finland	For Royal Caribbean International
13 January	Bendahara Sakam	Nakhoda-Ragam-class corvette	BAE Systems Marine	Scotstoun	United Kingdom	For Royal Brunei Navy
13 January	Oceanus	Ferry	Geoje	Samsung Heavy Industries	South Korea	For Minoan Lines
27 January	Malita	Ferry	Malta Shipbuilding	Valletta	Malta	For Gozo Ferries Co.
27 January	Gaudos	Ferry	Malta Shipbuilding	Valletta	Malta	For Gozo Ferries Co.
20 January	Sachsen	Sachsen-class frigate	Blohm + Voss	Hamburg	Germany	
10 February	Niamh	Róisín-class patrol vessel	Appledore Shipbuilders Ltd.	Appledore	United Kingdom	For Irish Naval Service.
17 February	APL Scotland	Samsung 5500-class container ship	Samsung Heavy Industries	Goeje	South Korea	
18 February	E.R. Paris	Samsung 5500-class container ship	Samsung Heavy Industries	Goeje	South Korea	
4 March	Ronald Reagan	Nimitz-class aircraft carrier	Northrop Grumman Newport News	Newport News, Virginia	United States	
9 March	Albion	Albion-class landing platform dock	BAE Systems	Barrow-in-Furness	United Kingdom	
10 March	E.R. Kobe	Samsung 5500-class container ship	Samsung Heavy Industries	Goeje	South Korea	
10 March	Pomeroy	Watson-class vehicle cargo ship	National Steel and Shipbuilding Company	San Diego, California	United States	
23 March	Jan	Sietas type 178 container ship	Schiffswerft J.J. Sietas	Hamburg-Neuenfelde	Germany	For Reederei Drevin
25 March	Iwo Jima	Wasp-class amphibious assault ship	Ingalls Shipbuilding	Pascagoula, Mississippi	United States	
31 March	E.R. Los Angeles	Samsung 5500-class container ship	Samsung Heavy Industries	Goeje	South Korea	
7 April	Tromp	De Zeven Provinciën-class frigate	Koninklijke Schelde Groep	Flushing	Netherlands	
7 April	Elisabeth Schulte	Type Hyundai 2530 TEU container ship	Hyundai			
8 April	Toisa Conqueror	Offshore supply vessel	Appledore Shipbuilders Ltd.	Appledore	United Kingdom	For Toisa Ltd.
12 April	232M Container Carrier	Charleston-Express-class container ship	China Shipbuilding Corporation	Kaohsiung	Taiwan	For Transportacion Maritima Mexicana
28 April	E.R. Los Angeles	Samsung 5500-class container ship	Samsung Heavy Industries	Goeje	South Korea	
10 May	Star Princess	Grand-class cruise ship	Fincantieri	Monfalcone	Italy	For Princess Cruises
11 May	Neuenfelde	Sietas type 178 container ship	Schiffswerft J.J. Sietas	Hamburg-Neuenfelde	Germany	For Bernd Bartels
25 May	Tabar	Talwar-class frigate	Baltic Shipyard	St. Petersburg	Russia	For Indian Navy
26 May	MSC Flaminia	Post-Panamax container ship	Daewoo Shipbuilding & Marine Engineering	Okpo-dong	South Korea	For Mediterranean Shipping Company
1 June	Preble	Arleigh Burke-class destroyer	Ingalls Shipbuilding	Pascagoula, Mississippi	United States	
5 June	Cap San Augustin	Cap-San-class container ship	Samsung Heavy Industries	Geoje	South Korea	For Hamburg Süd
14 June	Olympia Palace	ferry	Genoa	Fincantieri Sestri Cantieri Navale	Italy	For Minoan Lines
23 June	Mason	Arleigh Burke-class destroyer	Bath Iron Works	Bath, Maine	United States	
23 June	Nakhoda Ragam	Nakhoda-Ragam-class corvette	BAE Systems Marine	Scotstoun	United Kingdom	For Royal Brunei Navy
28 June	Finncarrier	Finnbreeze-class RoRo-ferry	Jinling Shipyard	Nanjing	China	For Norbulk Shipping
17 July	Cap San Antonio	Cap-San-class container ship	Samsung Heavy Industries	Geoje	South Korea	For Hamburg Süd
26 July	Takanami	Takanami-class destroyer			Japan	
11 August	Benavidez	Bob Hope-class vehicle cargo ship	Northrop Grumman Ship Systems	Avondale, Louisiana	United States	
18 August	Donata Schulte	Type Hyundai 2530 TEU container ship	Hyundai			
18 August	Hamburg Express	Hamburg Express-class container ship	Hyundai Heavy Industries	Ulsan	South Korea	For Hapag Lloyd
18 August	Ariadne Palace	Ferry	Geoje	Samsung Heavy Industries	South Korea	For Minoan Lines
20 August	Rickmers Hamburg	Type Superflex Heavy MPC container ship	Nanjing Jinling Shipyard	Nanjing	China	For Rickmers Group
23 August	Finnmill	Finnbreeze-class RoRo-ferry	Jinling Shipyard	Nanjing	China	For Nordic Forest Terminals
1 September	E.R. Canada	Samsung 5500-class container ship	Samsung Heavy Industries	Goeje	South Korea	
7 September	Meta	Type Stocznia Gdynia 8184-container ship	Stocznia Gdynia	Gdynia	Poland	
8 September	Anna-Sophie Dede	Sietas type 178 container ship	Schiffswerft J.J. Sietas	Hamburg-Neuenfelde	Germany	For Reederei Friedhelm Dede
19 September	Murillo	RoRo-Ferry	Astilleros Espanoles SA	Sevilla	Spain	For Cia. Trasmediterránea
20 September	Ōnami	Takanami-class destroyer			Japan	
30 September	Norwegian Star	Dawn-class cruise ship	Meyer Werft	Papenburg	Germany	For Norwegian Cruise Lines
30 November	MSC Melissa	Sealand-New-York-type container ship	Ulsan	Hyundai Heavy Industries	South Korea	For Costamare Shipping
4 October	Narushio	Oyashio-class submarine			Japan	
6 October	APL Belgium	Samsung 5500-class container ship	Samsung Heavy Industries	Goeje	South Korea	
26 October	Europa Palace	Ferry	Genoa	Fincantieri Sestri Cantieri Navale	Italy	For Minoan Lines
31 October	Constellation	Millennium-class cruise ship	Chantiers de l'Atlantique	St. Nazaire	France	For Celebrity Cruises
7 November	Rankin	Collins-class submarine	Australian Submarine Corporation	Osborne, South Australia	Australia	
10 November	Esther Schulte	Type Hyundai 2530 TEU container ship		Hyundai		IMO 9222118
11 November	P&O Nedlloyd Remuera	Santa-R-class container ship	Samsung Heavy Industries	Geoje	South Korea	For Offen Group
15 November	Bulwark	Albion-class landing platform dock	BAE Systems	Barrow-in-Furness	United Kingdom	
26 November	Liwia	Type Stocznia Gdynia 8184-container ship	Stocznia Gdynia	Gdynia	Poland	
12 December	Mustin	Arleigh Burke-class destroyer	Ingalls Shipbuilding	Pascagoula, Mississippi	United States	
14 December	Zuiderdam	Vista-class cruise ship	Fincantieri	Marghera	Italy	For Holland America Line
14 December	Romantika	Cruiseferry	Aker Finnyards	Rauma	Finland	For Tallink
14 December	Laura Ann	Sietas type 178 container ship	Schiffswerft J.J. Sietas	Hamburg-Neuenfelde	Germany	For Reederei Winfrid Eicke,
28 December	Berlin Express	Hamburg Express-class container ship	Hyundai Heavy Industries	Ulsan	South Korea	For Hapag Lloyd
December	Hanjin Cairo	Container ship	Hyundai Heavy Industries	Ulsan	South Korea	AKA COSCO Busan
Unknown date	Beauchamp	Electric boat	David Abels Boatbuilders Ltd.	Bristol	United Kingdom	For Beauchamp Lodge Settlement.
Unknown date	Deepwater Horizon	Oil rig	Hyundai Heavy Industries	Ulsan	South Korea	
Unknown date	Neptun Baroness	Brig	Schiffs. u. Yachtwerft Abeking & Rasmussen.	Lemwerder	Germany	Became Prince William for Tall Ships Youth Trust.
Unknown date	Spirit of Gosport	Ferry	David Abels Boatbuilders Ltd.	Bristol	United Kingdom	For Gosport Ferry Ltd.
