= Japanese destroyer Sazanami =

Japanese destroyers have been named Sazanami (漣 / さざなみ, "small wave" or "ripples"):

- Japanese destroyer Sazanami (1899) an Ikazuchi-class destroyer launched in 1899 and expended as a target in 1917
- Japanese destroyer Sazanami (1931), a Fubuki-class destroyer of the Imperial Japanese Navy during World War II
- JS Sazanami (DD-113), a Takanami-class destroyer the Japanese Maritime Self-Defense Force fleet

== See also ==
- Sazanami (disambiguation)
