= JS Izumo =

Japanese helicopter carrier

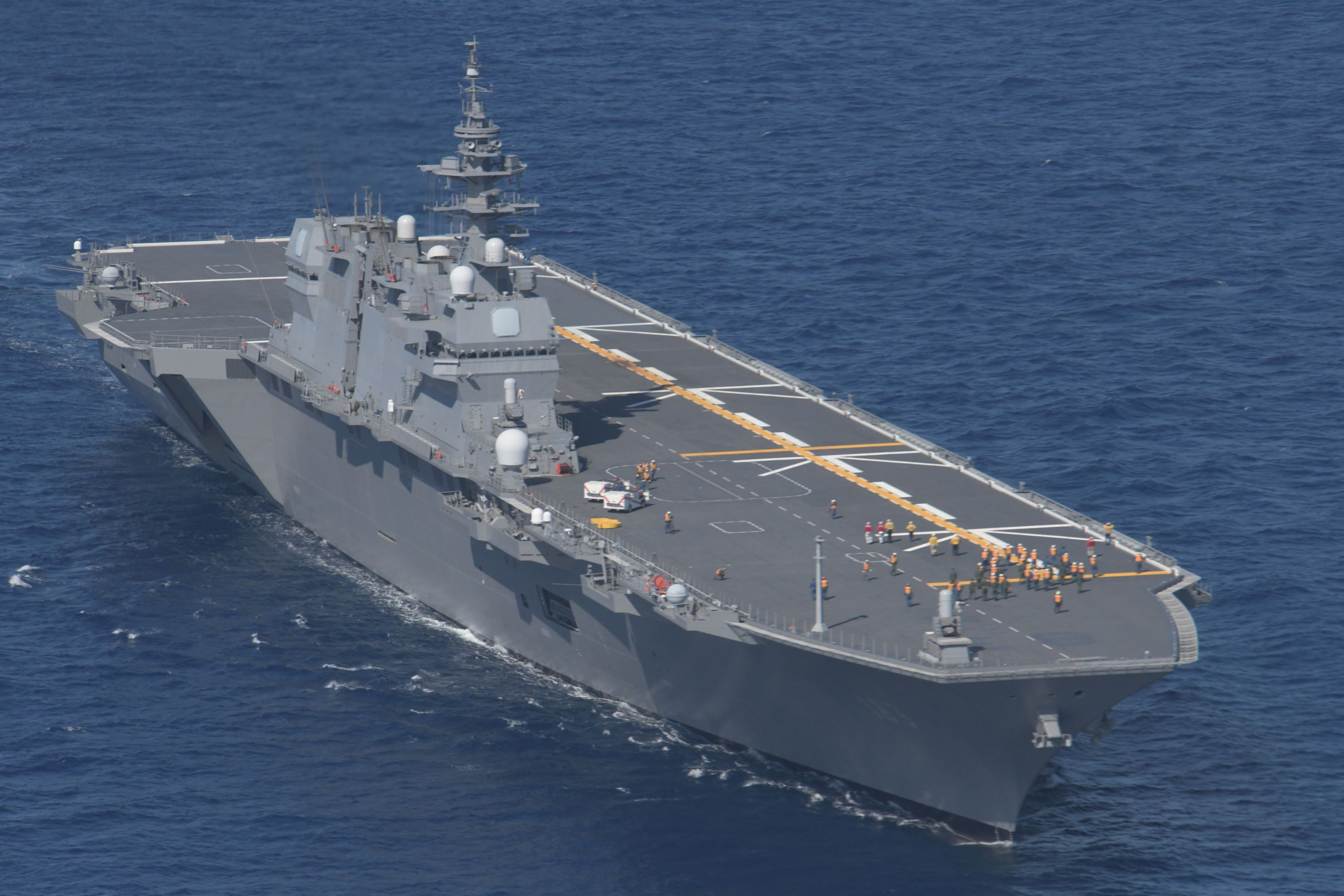
- JS Izumo (DDH/CVM-183) with new markings and heat resistance coating on the flight deck, 3 October 2021

History

Japan
- Name: Izumo; (いずも)
- Namesake: Izumo Province
- Ordered: 2010
- Builder: IHI Marine United
- Laid down: 27 January 2012
- Launched: 6 August 2013
- Commissioned: 25 March 2015
- Identification: Hull number: DDH/CVM-183; MMSI number: 431999556; Callsign: JSUM
- Status: In active service
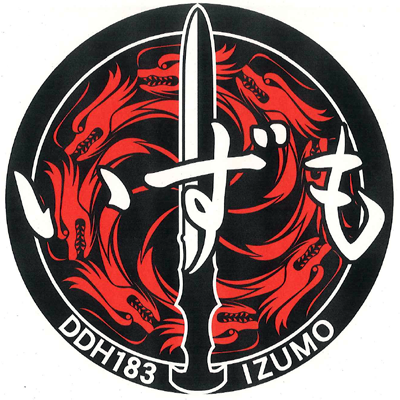
- Badge

General characteristics
- Class & type: Izumo-class aircraft-carrying multi-role cruiser
- Displacement: 19,950 t (19,630 long tons) empty; 26,000 t (26,000 long tons) full load
- Length: 248 m (813 ft 8 in)
- Beam: 38 m (124 ft 8 in)
- Height: 23.5 m (77 ft 1 in)
- Draft: 7.5 m (24 ft 7 in)
- Propulsion: COGAG, two shafts; 4 × GE/IHI LM2500IEC gas turbine
- Speed: More than 30 knots (35 mph; 56 km/h)
- Complement: 970 including crew and troops
- Sensors & processing systems: OYQ-12 combat direction system; FCS-3 fire control system; OPS-50 AESA radar; OPS-28 surface-search radar; OQQ-23 bow sonar
- Electronic warfare & decoys: NOLQ-3D-1 EW suite; Mark 36 SRBOC; Anti-torpedo mobile decoy (MOD); Floating acoustic jammer (FAJ)
- Armament: 2 × Phalanx CIWS; 2 × SeaRAM CIWS
- Aircraft carried: 7 ASW helicopters and 2 SAR helicopters; 28 aircraft maximum

JS Izumo (DDH-183) is a aircraft-carrying multi-role cruiser, which was previously classified as a multi-purpose operation destroyer. She is the lead ship in the Izumo class of the Japan Maritime Self-Defense Force (JMSDF), and the second warship to be named for Izumo Province, with the previous ship being the armored cruiser Izumo (1898).

The ruling Liberal Democratic Party announced in May 2018 that it favours converting Izumo to operate fixed-wing aircraft. The conversion was confirmed in December 2018 when Japan announced the change of its defense guidelines. Upon the completion of the process, Izumo will be the first Japanese naval vessel to operate fixed-wing aircraft since World War II.

== Design and construction ==
The construction of the first ship of the Izumo class began in 2011 at an IHI Marine United shipyard in Yokohama, with funding totalling 113.9 billion yen ($1.5 billion) being set aside in the fiscal 2010 budget for this purpose. The destroyers of this class were initially intended to replace the two ships of the Shirane class, which were originally scheduled to begin decommissioning in FY2014.

Izumo, the largest Japanese naval vessel since World War II, was laid down on 27 January 2012 and launched on 6 August 2013. The ship began sea trials on 29 September 2014. The ship was commissioned on 25 March 2015.

The ship is as large as a Japanese carrier of Second World War-era.

Izumo used to be called a destroyer because all large combat ships, except for submarines, were classified as destroyers according to the regulations of the JMSDF. However, as of October 28, 2024, the official classification of these ships has been changed to CVM (aircraft-carrying multi-role cruiser).

This vessel allows Japan to project military power well beyond its territorial waters.

== Characteristics ==
=== Aircraft carried ===
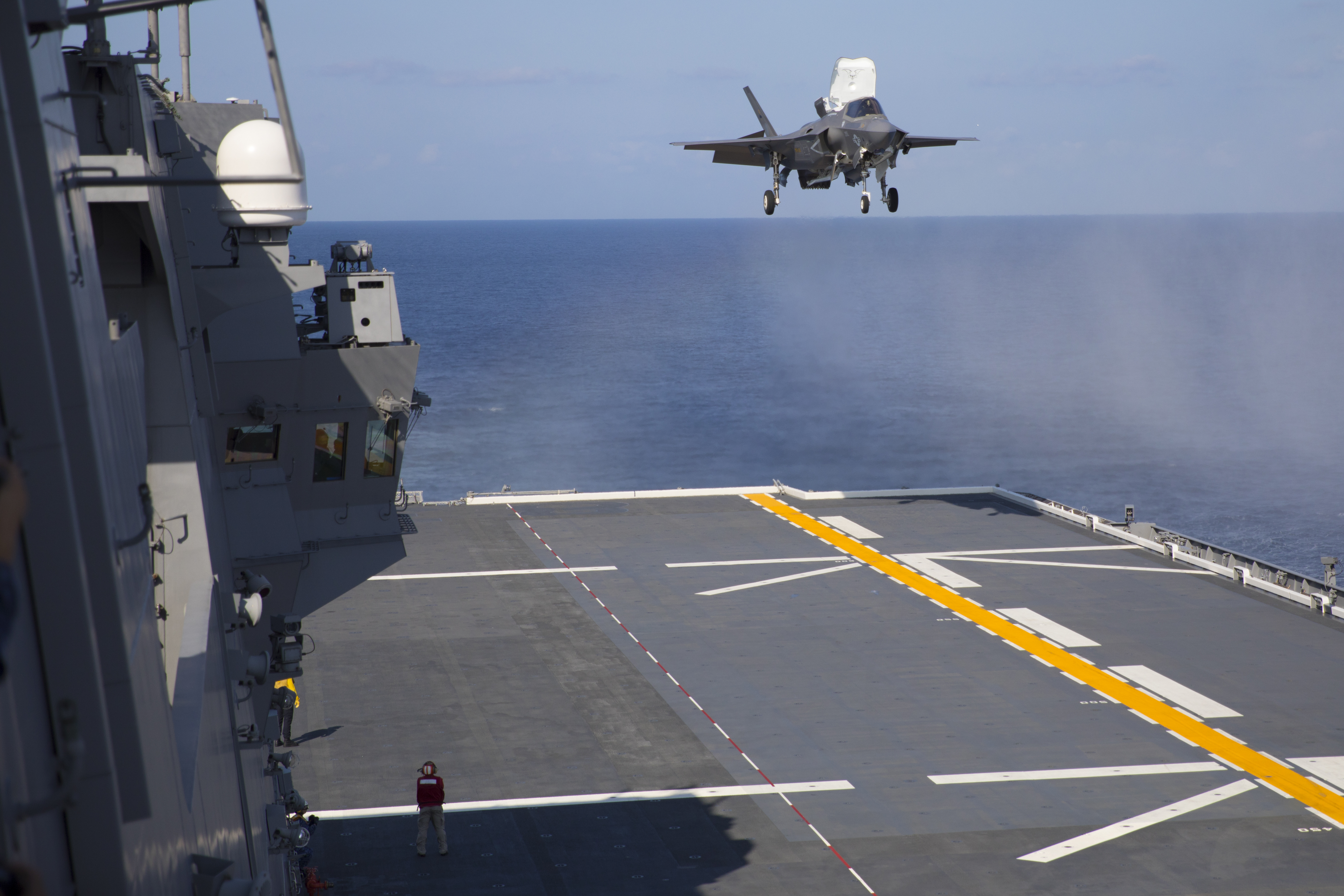
In support of the first ever F-35B Lightning II operations aboard a Japanese vessel, a U.S. Marine Corps F-35B Lightning II aircraft with Marine Fighter Attack Squadron (VMFA) 242 conducts a vertical landing aboard Izumo off the coast of Japan, on 3 October 2021.

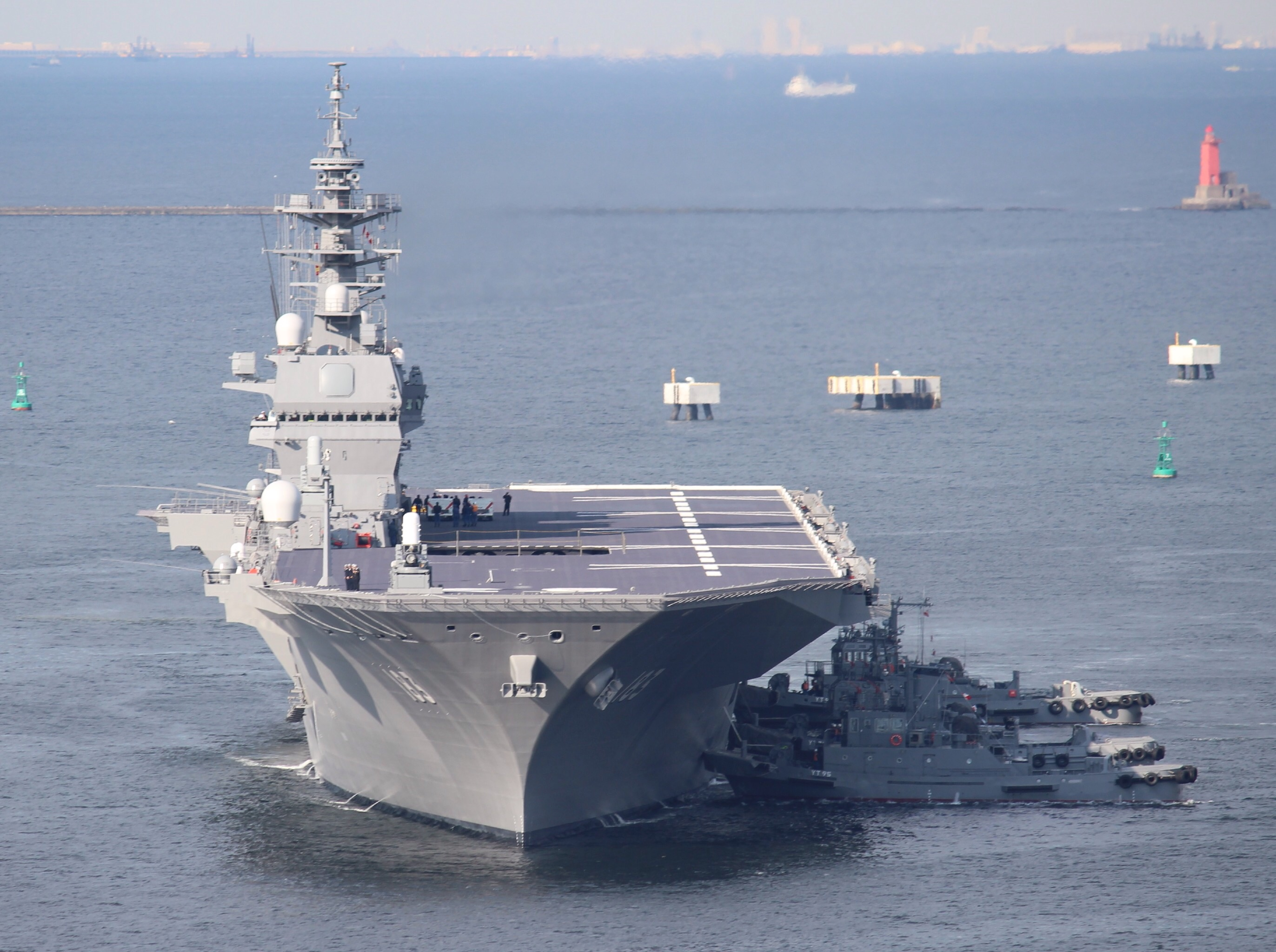
JS Izumo

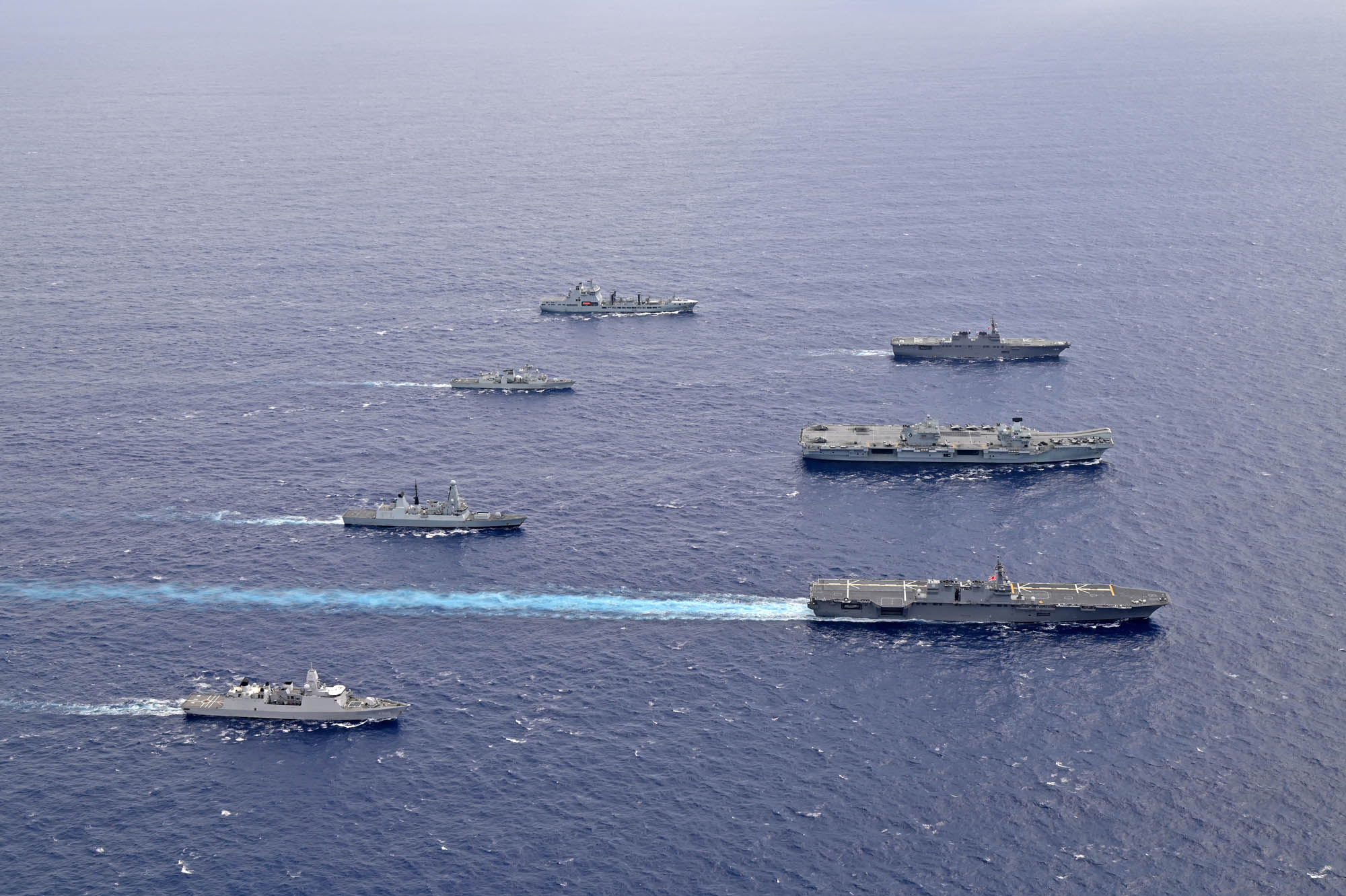
HMS Queen Elizabeth (middle right) and Izumo (front right) during joint training (September 2021)

The ship can carry up to 28 aircraft, or 14 larger aircraft. Only seven ASW helicopters and two SAR helicopters are planned for the initial aircraft complement. For other operations, 400 troops and 50 3.5-ton trucks (or equivalent equipment) can also be carried. The flight deck has five helicopter landing spots that allow simultaneous landings and take-offs.

In 2010, Forecast International reported that some design features were intended to support fixed-wing aircraft such as the Bell-Boeing V-22 Osprey and Lockheed Martin F-35 Lightning II; although neither the Ministry of Defense nor the JMSDF have mentioned the possibility of introducing fixed-wing aircraft. The ship has neither a "ski-jump" nor a catapult, typical features for launching fixed-wing aircraft. If Izumo-class ships were to operate fixed-wing aircraft, they would be limited to STOVL (short take-off, vertical landing) aircraft. Japan has purchased the conventional version of the Lightning II (the F-35A) but may buy the STOVL version (the F-35B) which could be operated from a modified Izumo-class ship. In December 2018, it was announced that the Japanese government would change its defense guidelines and purchase 42 F-35B fighters to operate them from both Izumo and her sister ship Kaga.

=== Air defense ===
The ship is equipped with two Phalanx CIWS and two SeaRAM for her defense.

== Operational history ==
Commissioned at Yokosuka port in Japan in March 2015, Izumo became operational in time to take part in a major August 2015 disaster drill conducted in Tokyo, alongside the Japan Coast Guard's large patrol vessel Izu. The two vessels acted as casualty receiving and triage stations during the exercise.

In May 2017 Izumo was deployed to escort USNS Richard E. Byrd, a US supply vessel, to the area off Shikoku. Richard E. Byrd's mission was to refuel another US warship that was defending against North Korean missiles. This was the first time a Japanese vessel was deployed to escort a US ship since security legislation was enacted in March 2016. A small protest took place at Yokosuka after Izumo's departure, under the belief that the deployment of an aircraft carrier was a violation of Japan's defense-only policy. The destroyer Sazanami also joined the mission.

In 2020, Izumo began the conversion to operate F-35B fighter aircraft. Conversion works were to proceed in two stages, with the first to strengthen the heat resistance of the deck and install power supply equipment to enable the departure and arrival of the F-35B. The renovation work to change the bow shape to a quadrangle for the safe operation of the F-35B and the maintenance of the interior compartments are scheduled to be carried out in the second stage, starting from the end of 2024. No plans exist to install a catapult or a sloping runway.

In September 2021, Izumo joined the British aircraft carrier HMS Queen Elizabeth and other vessels for exercises in the Pacific. In early October of that year, United States Marine Corps F-35B fighters operated off Izumo for the first time.

On 31 May 2022, the JMSDF announced that Izumo, JS Takanami and JS Kirisame will be deployed to RIMPAC 2022.

In June 2023, Izumo participated in the Indo-Pacific Deployment 2023. It carried out military exercise with Royal Australian Navy frigate HMAS Anzac and a Royal Australian Air Force P-8A Poseidon maritime patrol aircraft in the South China Sea. The exercise focused on tactical operations, including anti-surface and anti-air warfare.

In August 2024, Izumo participated in a military exercise near Okinawa with navies from Australia, Italy, Germany, and France. The Italian aircraft carrier Cavour also participated in the exercise. The exercise was intended to strength military cooperation with European countries.
