= JS Takanami =

Destroyer of the Japan Maritime Self-Defense Force

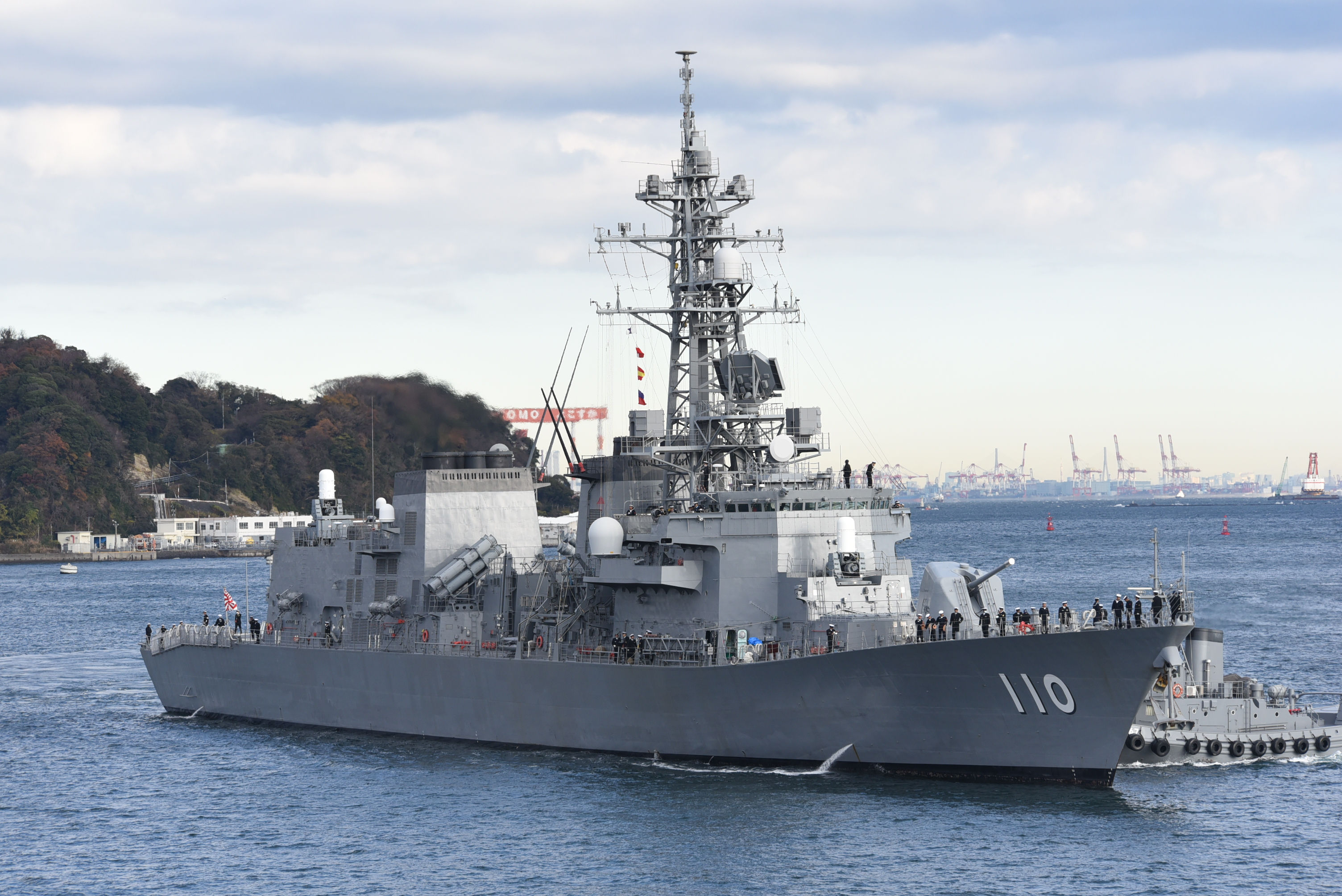
- JS Takanami in December 2016

History

Japan
- Name: Takanami; (たかなみ)
- Ordered: 1996
- Builder: IHI, Uraga
- Laid down: 25 April 2000
- Launched: 26 July 2001
- Commissioned: 12 March 2003
- Home port: Yokosuka
- Identification: MMSI number: 431999665; Callsign: JSTN; Pennant number: DD-110
- Status: Active

General characteristics
- Class & type: Takanami-class destroyer
- Displacement: 4,650 long tons (4,725 t) standard 6,300 long tons (6,401 t) full load
- Length: 151 m (495 ft)
- Beam: 17.4 m (57 ft)
- Height: 10.9 m (36 ft)
- Draft: 5.3 m (17 ft)
- Propulsion: 2 × Ishikawajima Harima LM-2500 gas turbines; 2 × Kawasaki Rolls-Royce Spey SM1C gas turbines; 60,000 shp (45 MW); 2 shafts
- Speed: 30 knots (56 km/h; 35 mph)
- Complement: 175
- Sensors & processing systems: OPS-25B Radar; OPS-28D Surface Search Radar; OPS-20 Navigational Radar; OQS-5 Sonar; UQR-2 Towed Sonar; Type 81 Fire Control System
- Electronic warfare & decoys: NOLQ-3 ECM system; 4 × Mk137 Chaff Dispensers
- Armament: 1 × Otobreda 127 mm/54 gun; 2 × missile canister up to 8 Type 90 (SSM-1B); 2 × 20 mm Phalanx CIWS; 2 × Type 68 triple torpedo tubes; VLS Mk 41 (32 cells); • Evolved Sea Sparrow SAM; • RUM-139 VL ASROC
- Aircraft carried: 1 × SH-60J(K) anti-submarine helicopter
- Aviation facilities: Hangar and helipad

JS Takanami (DD-110) (たかなみ) is the lead vessel of the Takanami-class destroyers of the Japan Maritime Self-Defense Force (JMSDF). Takanami translates to "high wave" in English.

== Design ==
The hull design is generally based on that of the Murasame class. However, as a part of the weaponry was changed, the internal structure was also changed accordingly. The Murasame class had a large lattice mast, which was claimed to degrade its stealthiness, leading to plans for two small masts for the Takanami - however the plans were not implemented. There was also no change made to the main engines, as there was little effect on the performance of the ship.

== Construction and career ==
Takanami was authorized under the Medium-term Defense Buildup Plan of 1996, and was built by IHI Marine United shipyards in Uraga, Kanagawa. She was laid down on 25 April 2000 and launched on 27 July 2001. She was commissioned into service on 12 March 2003, and was initially assigned to the JMSDF Escort Flotilla 1 based at Yokosuka.

Takanami, along with the destroyer Kirishima and supply ship Mashu was assigned to the Indian Ocean in August 2004 to provide assistance to anti-terrorist coalition forces in Afghanistan as part of Operation Enduring Freedom. On her return voyage to Japan in December 2004, the 2004 Indian Ocean earthquake and tsunami struck, and she was diverted to Thailand to participate in international rescue and recovery operations.

On 13 October 2009, Takanami, along with the destroyer Hamagiri, was dispatched to the coast of Somalia to participate in anti-piracy escort operations. From 7 November – 20 February 2010 she undertook 34 sorties, escorting 283 vessels safely. She returned to Japan on 18 March 2010.

Takanami was one of many in the JMSDF fleet participating in disaster relief after the 2011 Tōhoku earthquake and tsunami. She arrived at Ishinomaki, Miyagi the day after the disaster, rescuing 32 people.

On 11 October 2011 Takanami was dispatched to Aden, Yemen together with the destroyer Ōnami, to resume anti-piracy escort operations off the coast of Somalia. The context for this extended deployment off the Horn of Africa was the "Law on the Penalization of Acts of Piracy and Measures Against Acts of Piracy (Anti-Piracy Measures Law)". She returned to Yokosuka on 12 March 2012 and is currently assigned to the Sixth Squadron of the JMSDF Escort Flotilla 2.

On 16 November 2016, Takanami entered New Zealand waters to celebrate their Navy's 75th anniversary at the International Naval Review.

In February 2020, the ship was deployed to the Middle East to undertake, according to the Japanese government, an "intelligence-gathering deployment to protect vital oil shipments from the region". The vessel carried out its duties independently of the US-led International Maritime Security Construct.

On 31 May 2022, the JMSDF issued a press release on the Indo-Pacific Deployment (IPD) and ship deployments that announced the deployment of Takanami, the Izumo-class multi-purpose destroyer, JS Izumo and the Murasame-class destroyer JS Kirisame to RIMPAC 2022.

On 9 August 2022, as part of its IPD, the Takanami, along with the JS Izumo, conducted a trilateral exercise with the Royal Canadian Navy and the Royal New Zealand Navy, to demonstrate the solid ties between the three countries towards a realization of a "Free and Open Indo-Pacific."

On 8 July 2026, JS Takanami conducted joint naval activities with INS Surat (D69) of the Indian Navy after an operational turnaround during a port call in Mumbai on 5 July. The ship is on an operational deployment in the Western Indian Ocean.
