= JS Kirisame =

Japanese warship

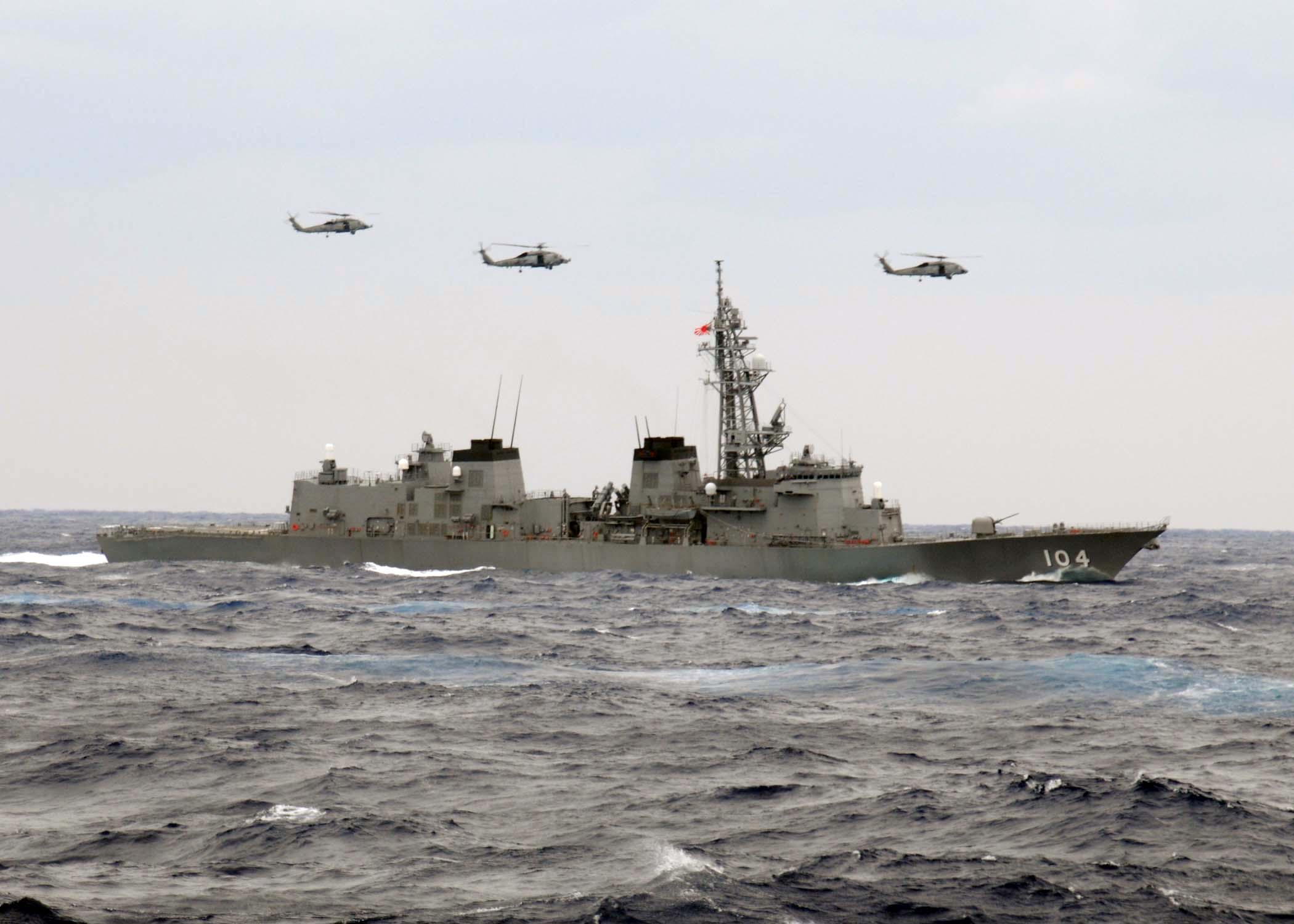
- JS Kirisame on 19 November 2008

History

Japan
- Name: Kirisame; (きりさめ)
- Namesake: Kirisame
- Ordered: 1994
- Builder: Mitsubishi, Nagasaki
- Laid down: 3 April 1996
- Launched: 21 August 1997
- Commissioned: 18 March 1999
- Home port: Sasebo
- Identification: MMSI number: 431999644; Pennant number:DD-104
- Status: Active

General characteristics
- Class & type: Murasame-class destroyer
- Displacement: 4,550 tons standard, 6,200 tons hull load
- Length: 151 m (495 ft 5 in)
- Beam: 17.4 m (57 ft 1 in)
- Draft: 5.2 m (17 ft 1 in)
- Propulsion: 2 × IHI-GE LM2500 gas turbines; 2 × KHI-RR SM1C gas turbines; 60,000 shp (45 MW); 2 shafts, cp props
- Speed: 30 knots (56 km/h; 35 mph)
- Complement: 165
- Sensors & processing systems: OYQ-9 CDS (w/ Link-11); OYQ-103 ASWCS; FCS-2-31 fire-control systems; OPS-24B air search radar; OPS-28 surface search radar; OQS-5 hull sonar; OQR-2 TASS
- Electronic warfare & decoys: NOLQ-3 suite; Mk. 36 SRBOC Chaff and Decoy Launching System; AN/SLQ-25 torpedo decoys
- Armament: 1 × OTO Melara 76 mm gun; 2 × 20 mm Phalanx CIWS; 8 × SSM-1B Anti-ship missile in quad canisters; 2 × triple 324 mm torpedo tubes; 16-cell Mk. 48 VLS with Evolved Sea Sparrow SAM; 16-cell Mk. 41 VLS with VL-ASROC
- Aircraft carried: 1 × SH-60J/K anti-submarine helicopter

JS Kirisame (DD-104) is the fourth ship of Murasame-class destroyers of the Japan Maritime Self-Defense Force (JMSDF). She was commissioned on 18 March 1999.

== Design ==
The hull design was completely renovated from first-generation destroyers. In addition to increasing the size, in order to reduce the underwater radiation noise, both the superstructure and hull were inclined to reduce the radar cross-section. However, there is no angled tripod mainmast like that of the American Arleigh Burke-class destroyer because of the heavy weather of the Sea of Japan in winter. The aft was designed like a "mini-Oranda-zaka", as with the Kongō class, to avoid interference between helicopters and mooring devices. Destroyers built under the First Defense Build-up Plan, including the former Murasame class, adopted a unique long-forecastle style called "Oranda-zaka".

The engine arrangement is COGAG, as in the Asagiri-class, but a pair of engines were updated to Spey SM1C. The remaining pair were replaced by LM2500, as in the Kongō-class.

== Construction and career ==
Kirisame was laid down on 3 April 1996 at Mitsubishi Heavy Industries, Nagasaki, as the 1994 plan, and launched on 21 August 1997. Commissioned on 18 March 1999, she was incorporated into the 6th Escort Corps of the 2nd Escort Corps and deployed to Sasebo.

On 10 May 2020, he departed from Sasebo base for the Middle East as the Second Dispatch Information-gathering Activity Water Squadron. On 9 June 2020, after arriving at the site, she took over the mission from JS Takanami and started information gathering activities. On 6 October 2020, she took over the mission of JS Murasame of the 3rd party. On 26 October 2020, she returned to Sasebo base. From 19-20 2020, Japan-US-Australia joint training was conducted with USS John S. McCain and HMAS Arunta in the South China Sea.

On 31 May 2022, the JMSDF issued a press release on the Indo-Pacific Deployment (IPD) and ship deployments, stating that Kirisame, the Takanami-class destroyer Takanami and the Izumo-class multi-purpose destroyer Izumo were deployed to RIMPAC 2022.

== Gallery ==
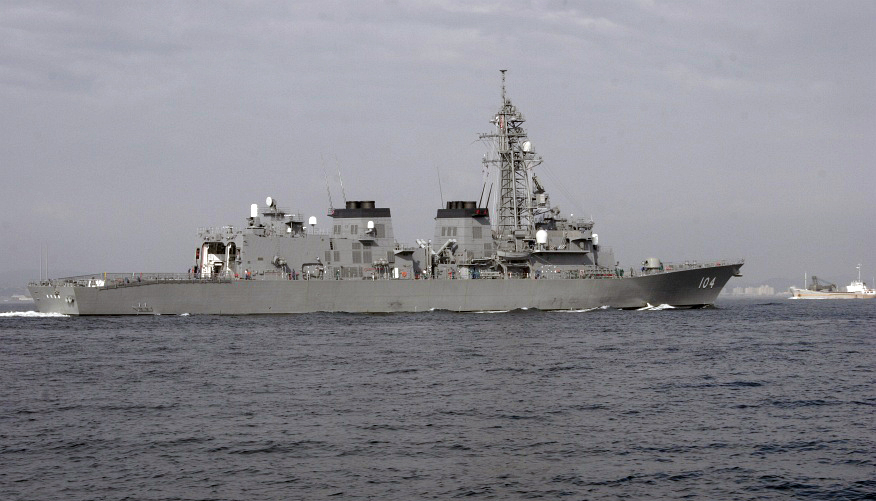
Kirisame underway, date unknown

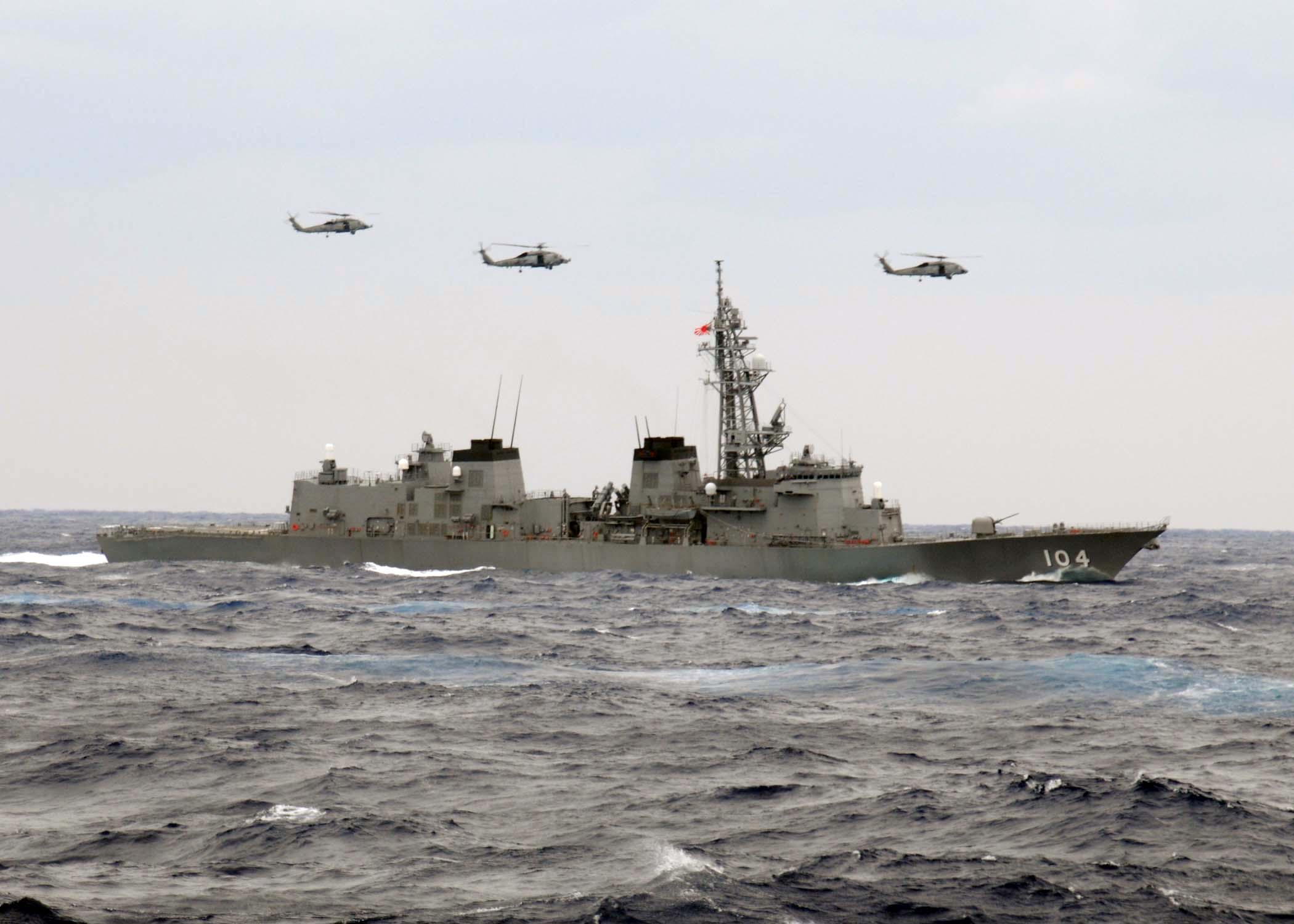
US Navy helicopters fly over Kirisame, 19 November 2008

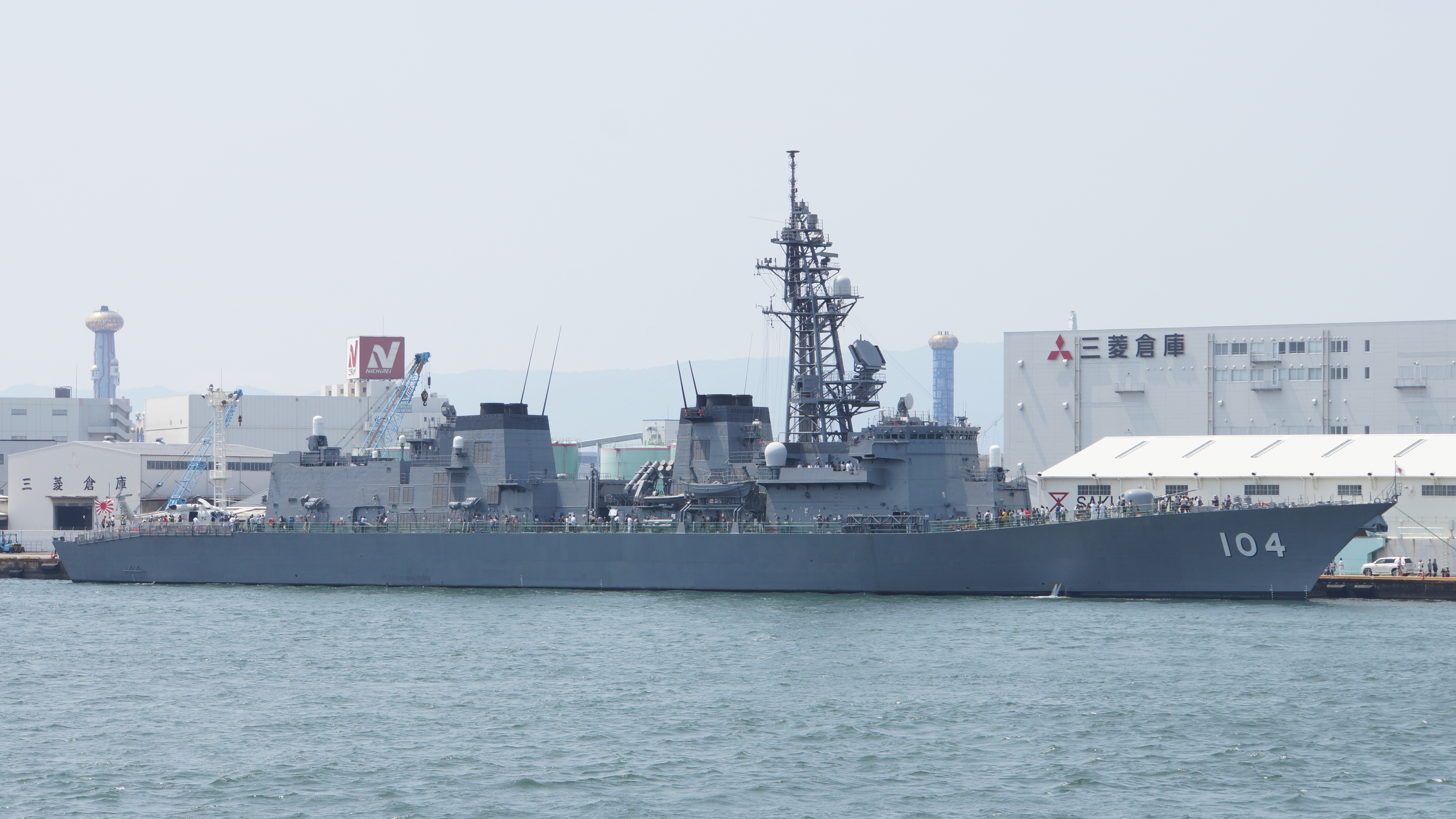
Kirisame at Osaka on 15 May 2016

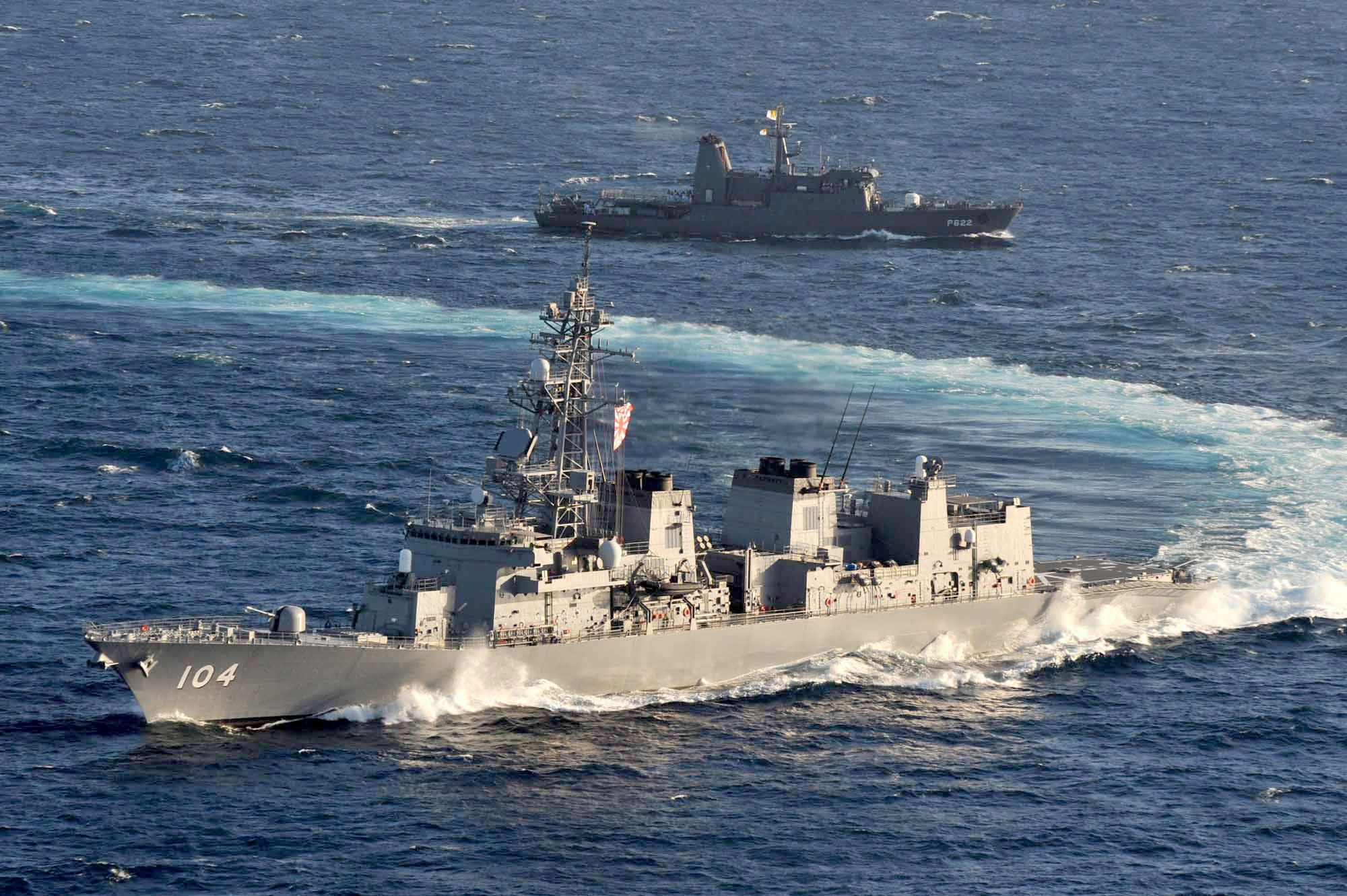
Kirisame maneuvering in December 2016

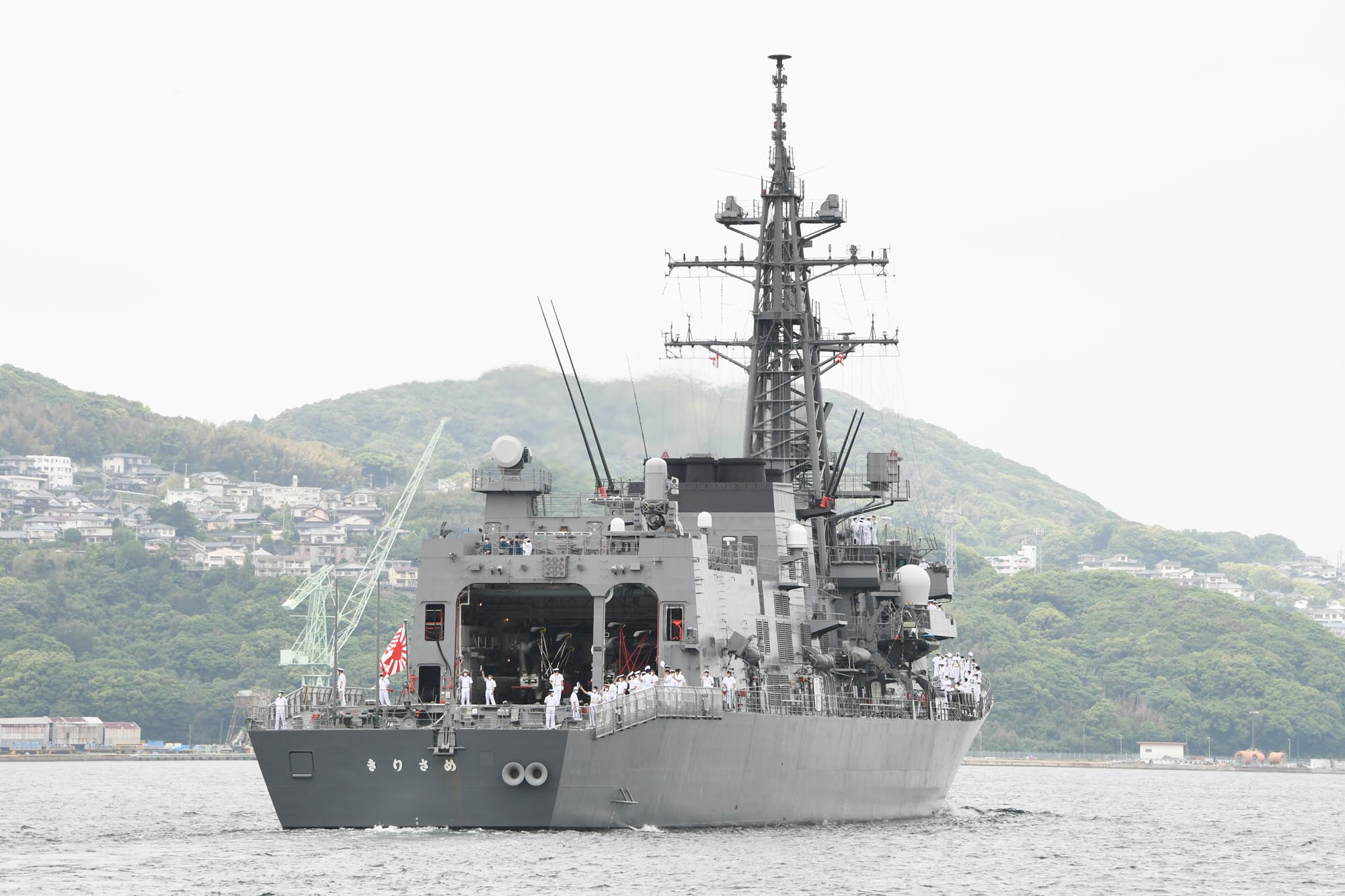
Kirisame on 10 May 2020

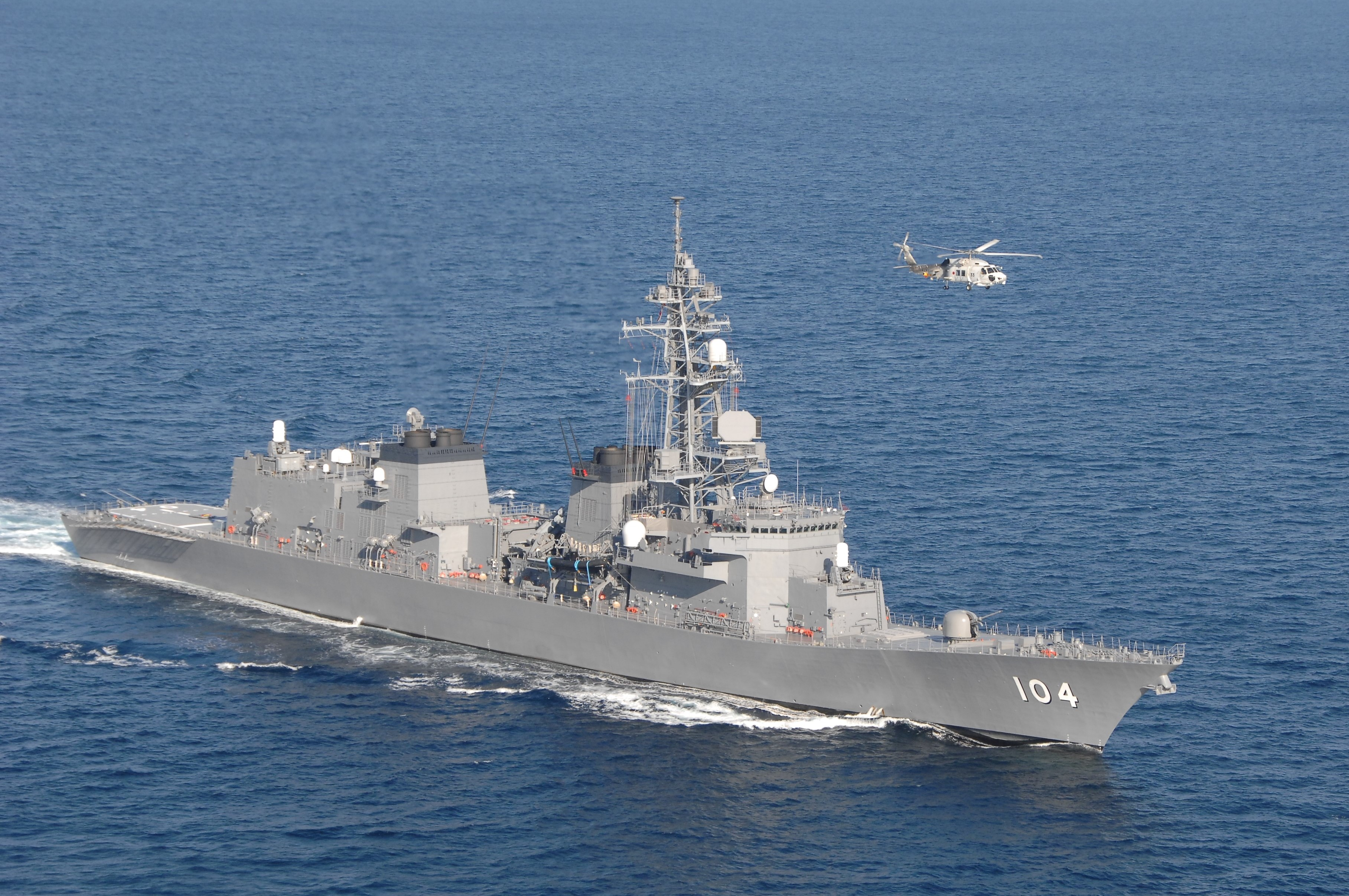
Kirisame in 18 April 2021

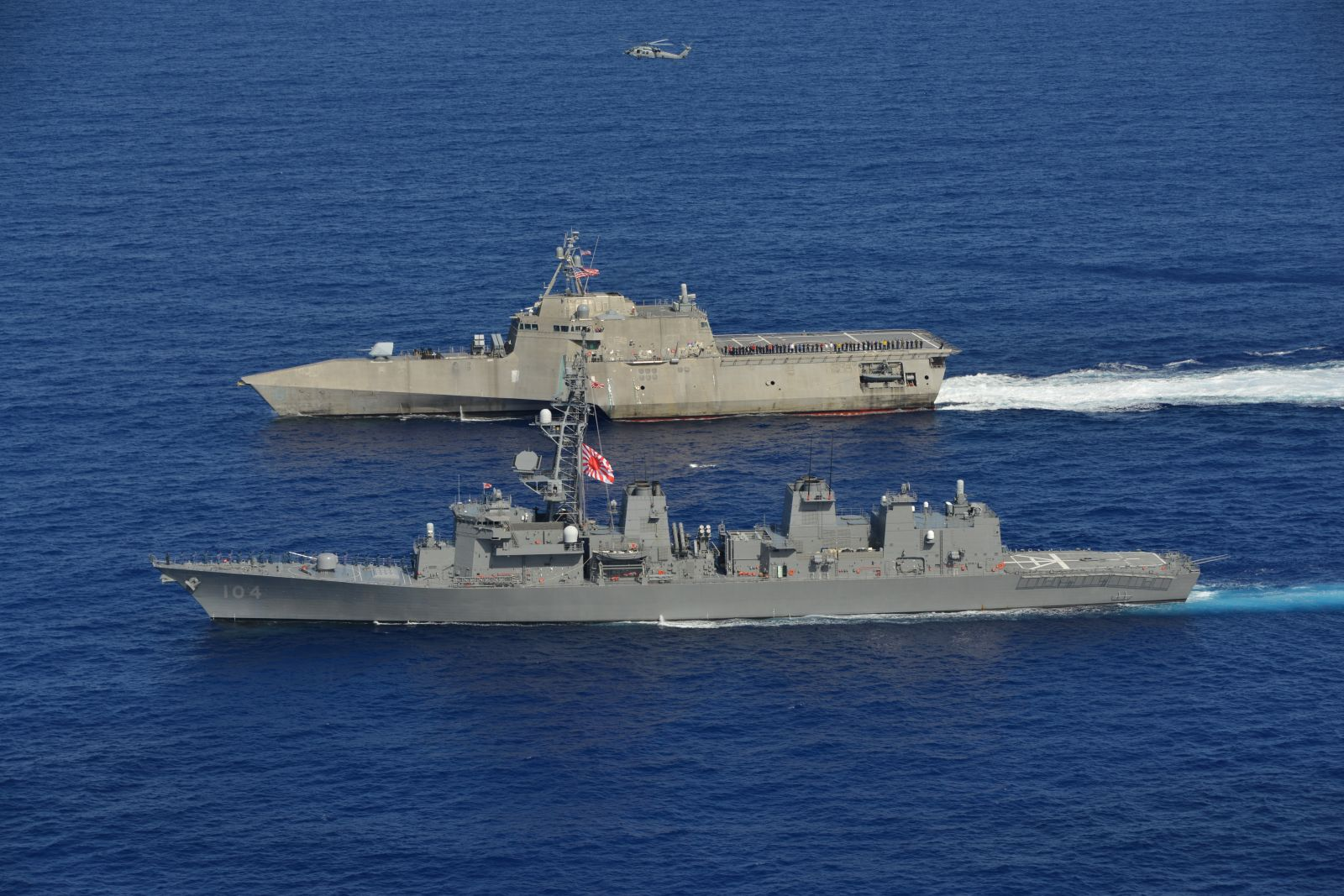
Kirisame sails alongside USS Jackson, 24 July 2022

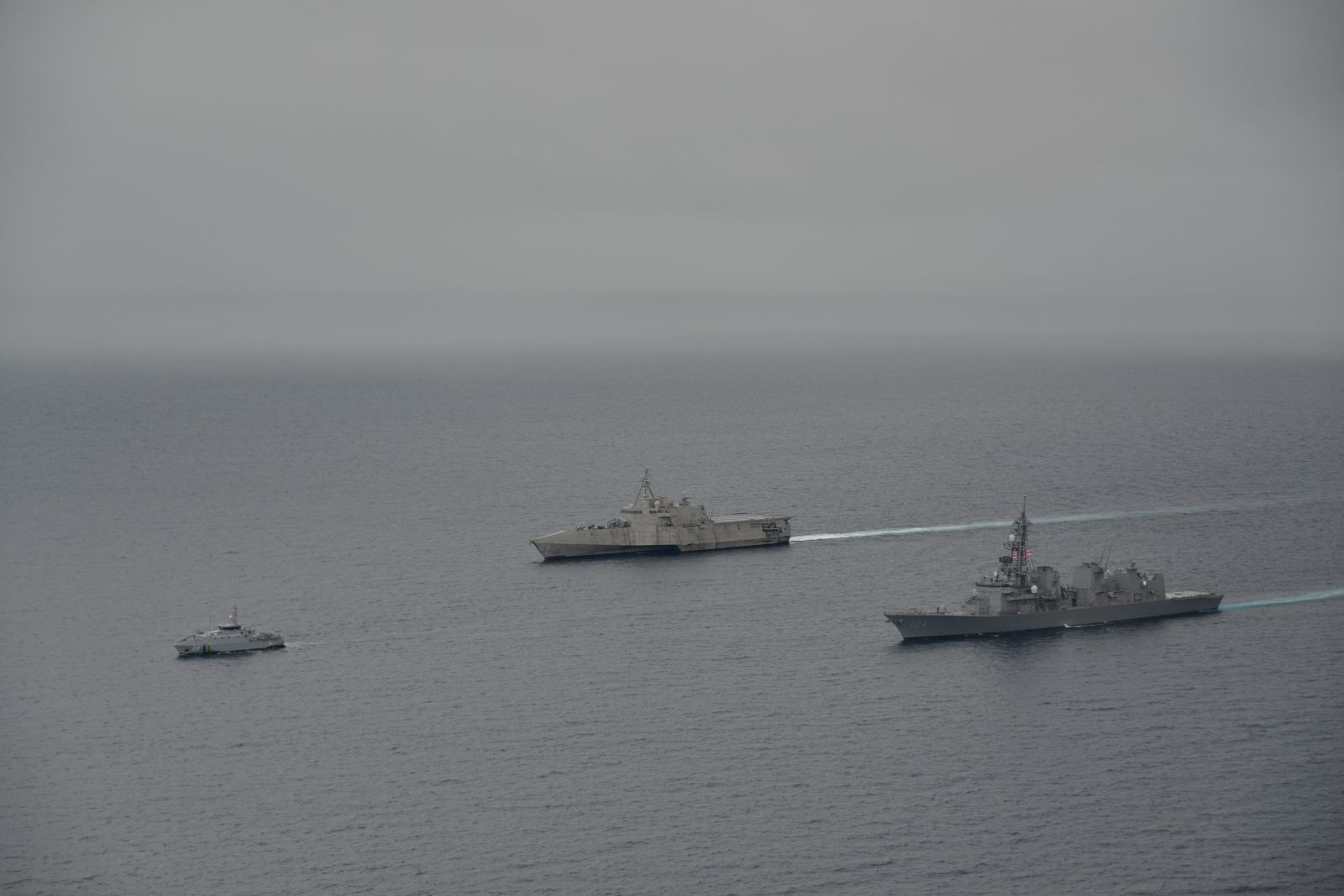
Kirisame alongside USS Oakland as they are led by RSIPV Taro, 8 August 2022
