= JS Ōnami =

Destroyer of the Japan Maritime Self-Defense Force

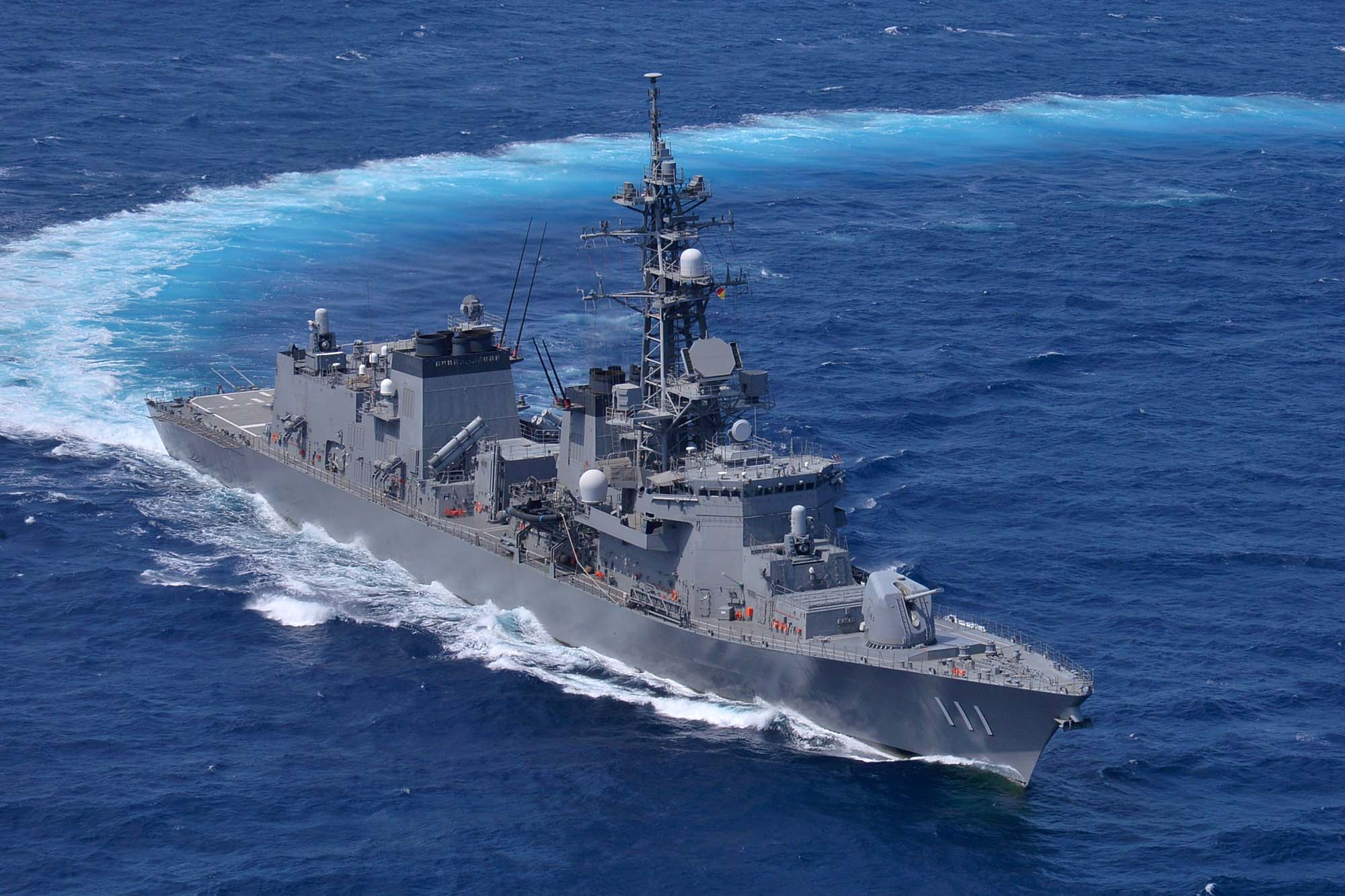
- JS Ōnami

History

Japan
- Name: Ōnami; (おおなみ)
- Namesake: Ōnami (1960)
- Ordered: 1998
- Builder: Mitsubishi, Nagasaki
- Laid down: 17 May 2000
- Launched: 20 September 2001
- Commissioned: 13 March 2003
- Home port: Yokosuka
- Identification: MMSI number: 431999666; Pennant number: DD-111
- Status: Active

General characteristics
- Class & type: Takanami-class destroyer
- Displacement: 4,650 long tons (4,725 t) standard 6,300 long tons (6,401 t) full load
- Length: 151 m (495 ft)
- Beam: 17.4 m (57 ft)
- Height: 10.9 m (36 ft)
- Draft: 5.3 m (17 ft)
- Propulsion: 2 × Ishikawajima Harima LM-2500 gas turbines; 2 × Kawasaki Rolls-Royce Spey SM1C gas turbines; 60,000 shp (45 MW); 2 shafts
- Speed: 30 knots (35 mph; 56 km/h)
- Complement: 175
- Sensors & processing systems: OPS-25B Radar; OPS-28D Surface Search Radar; OPS-20 Navigational Radar; OQS-5 Sonar; UQR-2 Towed Sonar; Type 81 Fire Control System
- Electronic warfare & decoys: NOLQ-3 ECM system; 4 × Mk137 Chaff Dispensers
- Armament: 1 × Otobreda 127 mm/54 gun; 2 × missile canister up to 8 Type 90 (SSM-1B); 2 × 20 mm Phalanx CIWS; 2 × Type 68 triple torpedo tubes; VLS Mk 41 (32 cells); • Evolved Sea Sparrow SAM; • RUM-139 VL ASROC
- Aircraft carried: 1 × SH-60J(K) anti-submarine helicopter
- Aviation facilities: Hangar and helipad

JS Ōnami (DD-111) (おおなみ, Oonami) is the second vessel of the Takanami-class destroyers of the Japan Maritime Self-Defense Force (JMSDF).

== Design ==
The hull design is generally based on that of the Murasame class. However, as a part of weapons was changed, the internal structure has also been changed. And it was said that the large lattice mast was degrading its stealthiness in the Murasame class, so in this class, it was considered to change to two small masts, but it was not implemented.

Although its displacement become slightly increased, there is no change in its main engines, as it is not a big difference that has little effect on the performance of the ship.

== Construction and career ==
Ōnami was authorized under the Medium-term Defense Buildup Plan of 1996, and was built by Mitsubishi Heavy Industries shipyards in Nagasaki. She was laid down on 17 May 2000, launched on 20 September 2001. She was commissioned into service on 13 March 2003. and was initially assigned to the JMSDF Escort Flotilla 1 based at Yokosuka.

Ōnami, along with the destroyer Chōkai and supply ship Hamana were assigned to the Indian Ocean in November 2004 to provide assistance to the Japanese Iraq Reconstruction and Support Group. She returned to Japan in March 2005.

Ōnami participated in the Malabar 2007 joint naval exercises in the Bay of Bengal in September 2007 together with the destroyer Yūdachi. In July 2009, she participated in joint naval exercises in the Sea of Japan together with a number of warships from the Republic of Korea Navy.

On 4 December 2009, Ōnami was involved in a collision with the destroyer Sawagiri off the coast of Kōchi Prefecture, but was able to return to port under her own power.

In January 2010, Ōnami, along with Sawagiri, was dispatched to Aden, Yemen to participate in anti-piracy escort operations off the coast of Somalia. Approximately 2,000 merchant ships with ties to Japan, Japan-flagged or operated by Japanese firms pass through the busy shipping zone each year. The destroyer was part of the fourth rotation of JMSDF vessels patrolling in this region. She undertook 32 sorties, escorting 283 commercial vessels, and returned to Japan on 2 July 2010.

This ship was one of several in the JMSDF fleet participating in disaster relief after the 2011 Tōhoku earthquake and tsunami.

On 11 October 2011 she was dispatched to Aden again, together with her sister ship Takanami, to resume anti-piracy escort operations off the coast of Somalia. The context for this extended deployment off the Horn of Africa was the "Law on the Penalization of Acts of Piracy and Measures Against Acts of Piracy (Anti-Piracy Measures Law)". She returned to Yokosuka on 12 March 2012

On 9 June 2012, Ōnami participated in JIMEX 12, the first naval exercise between the JMSDF and the Indian Navy, held in Sagami Bay, which commemorated 60 years of diplomatic relations between India and Japan.
