= Sazanami =

Sazanami (漣 / さざなみ; "small wave" or "ripples") may refer to:

- Sazanami (train), a limited express train service in Japan
- Japanese destroyer Sazanami, two destroyers of the Imperial Japanese Navy and one of the Japanese Maritime Self-Defense Force
- Kuina Sazanami, character in Tougen Anki
