= JS Sazanami =

Destroyer of the Japan Maritime Self-Defense Force

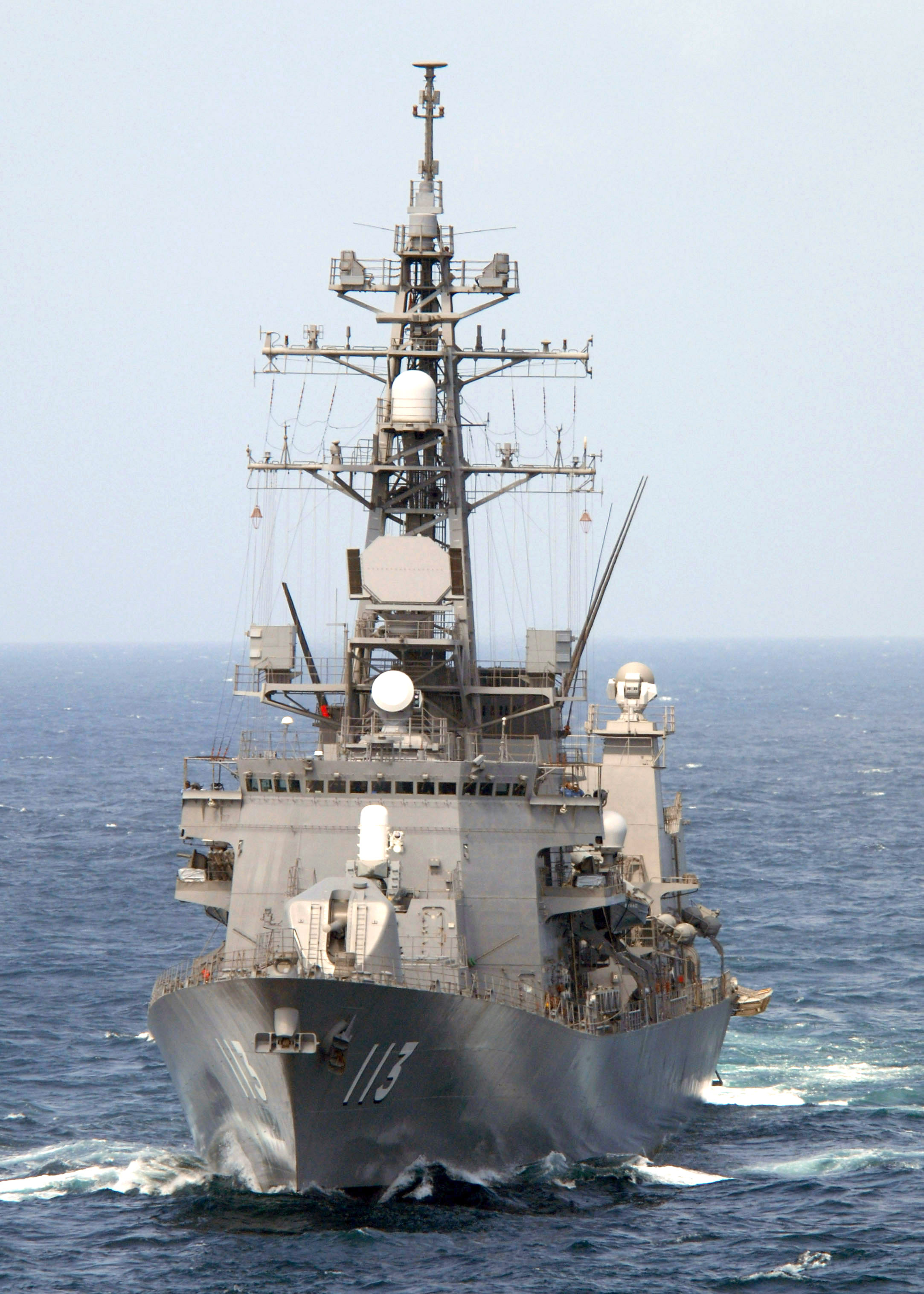

History

Japan
- Name: Sazanami; (さざなみ)
- Ordered: 2000
- Builder: Mitsubishi, Nagasaki
- Laid down: 4 April 2002
- Launched: 29 August 2003
- Commissioned: 16 February 2005
- Home port: Kure
- Identification: MMSI number: 431999679; Pennant number: DD-113
- Status: Active

General characteristics
- Class & type: Takanami-class destroyer
- Displacement: 4,650 long tons (4,725 t) standard 6,300 long tons (6,401 t) full load
- Length: 151 m (495 ft)
- Beam: 17.4 m (57 ft)
- Height: 10.9 m (36 ft)
- Draft: 5.3 m (17 ft)
- Propulsion: 2 × Ishikawajima Harima LM-2500 gas turbines; 2 × Kawasaki Rolls-Royce Spey SM1C gas turbines; 60,000 shp (45 MW); 2 shafts
- Speed: 30 knots (56 km/h; 35 mph)
- Complement: 175
- Sensors & processing systems: OPS-25B Radar; OPS-28D Surface Search Radar; OPS-20 Navigational Radar; OQS-5 Sonar; UQR-2 Towed Sonar; Type 81 Fire Control System
- Electronic warfare & decoys: NOLQ-3 ECM system; 4 × Mk137 Chaff Dispensers
- Armament: 1 × Otobreda 127 mm/54 gun; 2 × missile canister up to 8 Type 90 (SSM-1B); 2 × 20 mm Phalanx CIWS; 2 × Type 68 triple torpedo tubes; VLS Mk 41 (32 cells); • Evolved Sea Sparrow SAM; • RUM-139 VL ASROC
- Aircraft carried: 1 × SH-60J(K) anti-submarine helicopter
- Aviation facilities: Hangar and helipad

JS Sazanami (さざなみ) is the fourth vessel of the Takanami-class destroyers of the Japan Maritime Self-Defense Force (JMSDF).

== Design ==
The hull design is generally based on that of the Murasame class. However, some of the weapons and the internal structure have been changed. It was said that the large lattice mast was degrading its stealthiness in the Murasame class, so changing to two small masts was considered but not implemented.

Although her displacement become slightly increased, there is no change in her main engines, as it is not a big difference that has little effect on the performance of the ship.

== Construction and career ==
Sazanami was authorized under the Medium-term Defense Buildup Plan of 1996, and was built by Mitsubishi Heavy Industries shipyards in Nagasaki. She was laid down on 4 April 2002, launched on 29 August 2003. She was commissioned into service on 16 February 2005. and was initially assigned to the JMSDF Escort Flotilla 2 based at Sasebo.

Sazanami, along with the fleet oiler Maiyu were assigned to the Indian Ocean in June 2006 to provide assistance in refueling anti-terrorist coalition forces in Afghanistan as part of Operation Enduring Freedom. She returned to Japan in November 2006.

On 24 June 2008, Sazanami was the first JMSDF ship to bring disaster relief to the Chinese port of Zhanjiang following the 2008 Sichuan earthquake. According to China Daily, the Japanese media sent more than 60 reporters to cover the event.

From 14 March 2009, Sazanami, along with the destroyer Samidare, was sent to the Gulf of Aden to participate in anti-piracy escort operations and to provide humanitarian assistance. The destroyer was the first of a series of JMSDF vessels deployed in rotation to patrol this region. Approximately 2,000 merchant ships with ties to Japan, Japan-flagged or operated by Japanese firms pass through the busy shipping channel each year. On 5 April 2009, she responded to a distress call made by a Singaporean-registered tanker, using a LRAD to warn approaching pirates away. She returned to Japan on 16 August 2009.

On 15 March 2011, Sazanami, along with the destroyer Inazuma, was again dispatched to Aden, Yemen, to anti-piracy escort operations off the coast of Somalia. The destroyer was part of the eighth rotation of JMSDF vessels patrolling in this region. She undertook 28 sorties, returning to Japan on 16 August 2011. During this deployment, Sazanami also made a courtesy port call at Colombo, Sri Lanka.

Sazanami is currently assigned to the Eight Squadron of the JMSDF Escort Flotilla 4 based at Kure, Hiroshima.
