= OPS-28 =

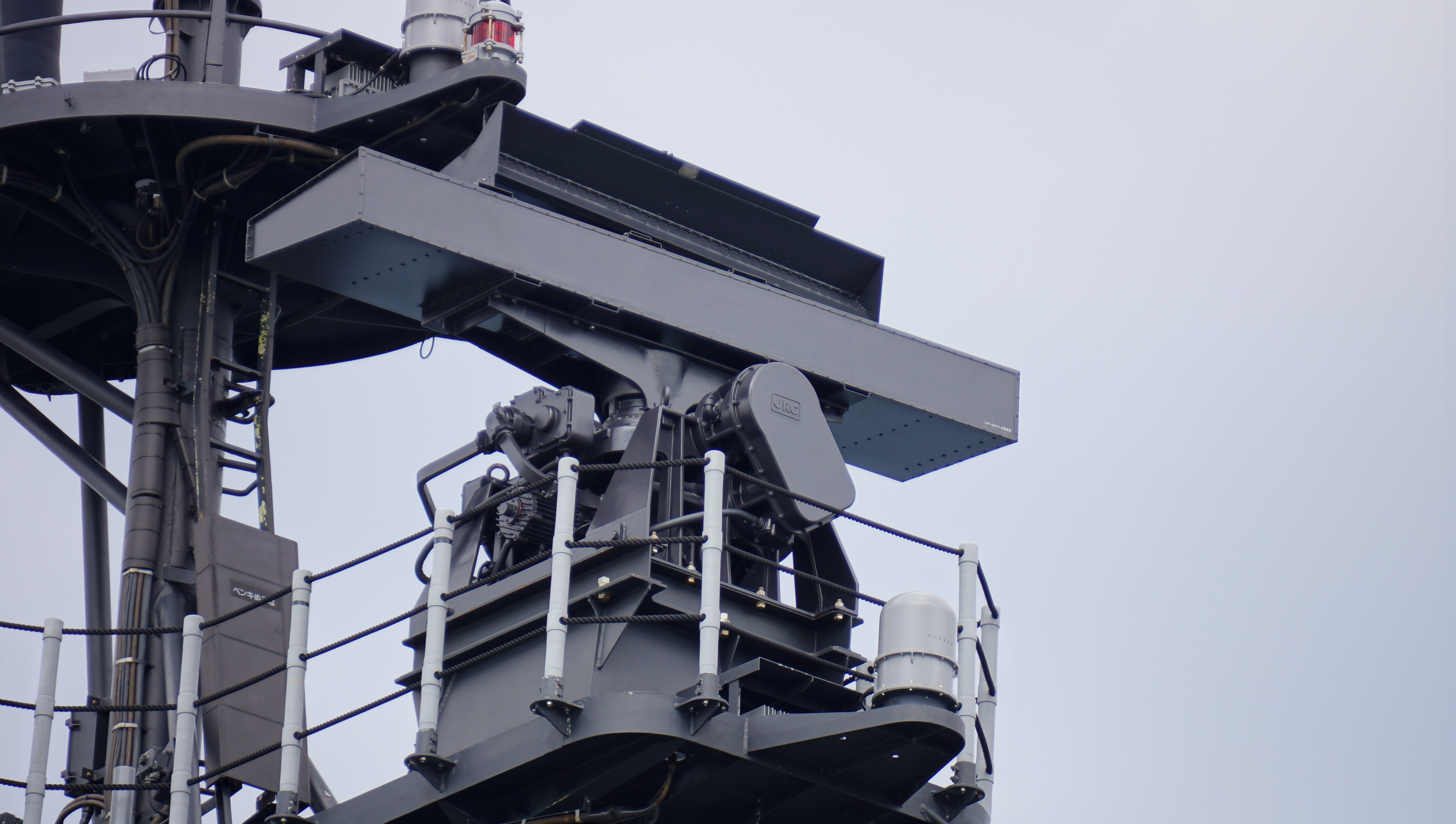
- OPS-28 aboard JS Kurama
- Country of origin: Japan
- Manufacturer: Japan Radio
- Introduced: 1980
- Frequency: C Band
- Azimuth: Unlimited

OPS-28 is a Pulse-Doppler radar manufactured by Japan Radio. It is installed as a low-altitude warning / anti-water search radar mainly on the Maritime Self-Defense Force's escort ship. Variations include OPS-28-1, OPS-28B, OPS-28C, OPS-28D, OPS-28E and OPS-28F.

The model numbers of the Maritime Self-Defense Force's electronic devices, including this machine, are generally based on the naming rules for military electronic devices of the U.S. military. It is for radar mounted on surface vessels, for detection / distance direction measurement / search.

== Overview ==
A traveling wave tube (TWT) and a crossed power amplifier tube (CFA) are used as radar transmitters, and when used for normal voyages, they are switched to another transmitter using a magnetron. The operating frequency is C Band, and pulse compression technology has been introduced. It has been continuously improved, and there are multiple models of OPS-28B, OPS-28C, and OPS-28D depending on the mounting method of the IFF antenna. It began to be installed on the JS Shirane, which was commissioned in 1980.

It can be used not only for surface targets but also for detecting low-flying anti-ship missiles (sea skimmers) as a low-altitude warning radar, and is said to be similar to the US Navy's TAS Mk.23. Conventional anti-water radar has almost doubled the detection distance from the front to the sea skimmer, which was about the line of sight of radio waves. In addition, the OPS-28-1 installed on the JS Ishikari and Yūbari-class destroyer escort has been given more full-scale anti-aircraft alert capability by changing the beam pattern.

However, with this aircraft, the emphasis on precision search at long distances reduces the search capability at short distances, and in order to compensate for this, OPS-19 / OPS-20 radar may also be installed on ships equipped with this aircraft.

=== On board ships ===
- Shirane-class destroyer
- Haruna-class destroyer
- Izumo-class helicopter destroyer
- Kongō-class destroyer
- Atago-class destroyer
- Hatsuyuki-class destroyer
- Asagiri-class destroyer
- Murasame-class destroyer
- Takanami-class destroyer
- JS Ishikari
- Yūbari-class destroyer escort
- Abukuma-class destroyer escort
- Ōsumi-class tank landing ship
- Towada-class replenishment ship
- Mashū-class replenishment ship

== Gallery ==
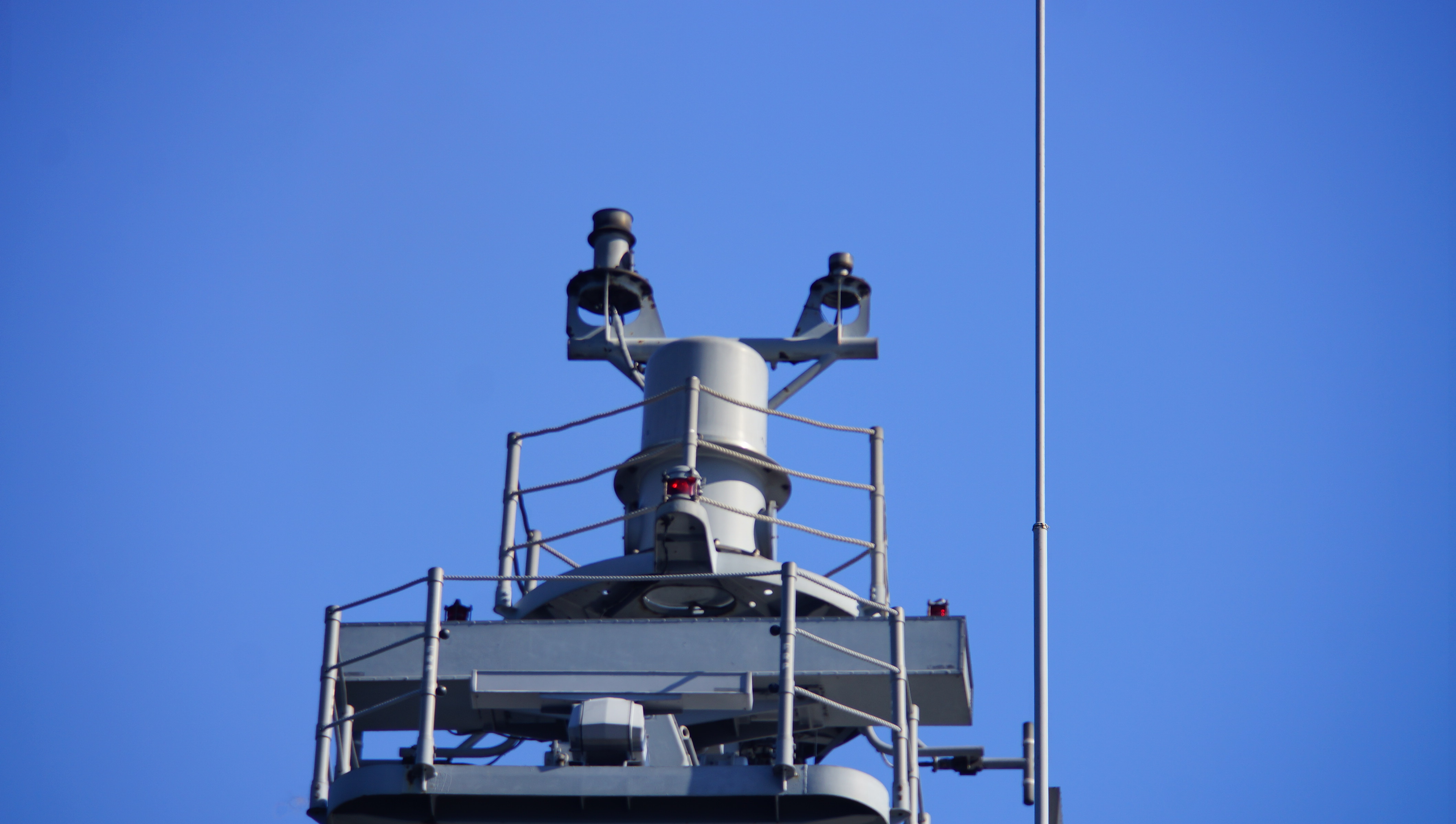
OPS-28B aboard JS Hatakaze

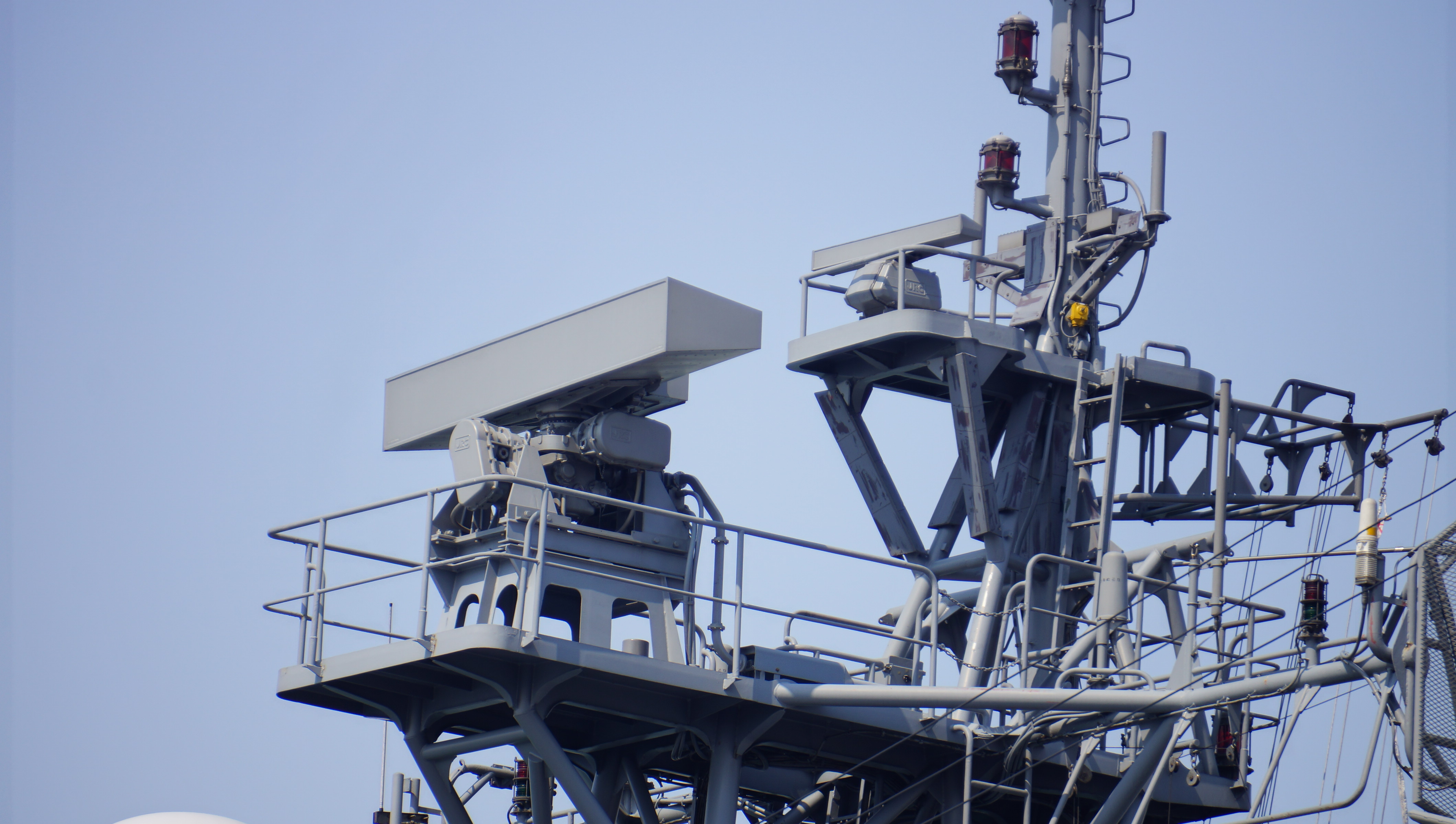
OPS-28C aboard JS Asagiri

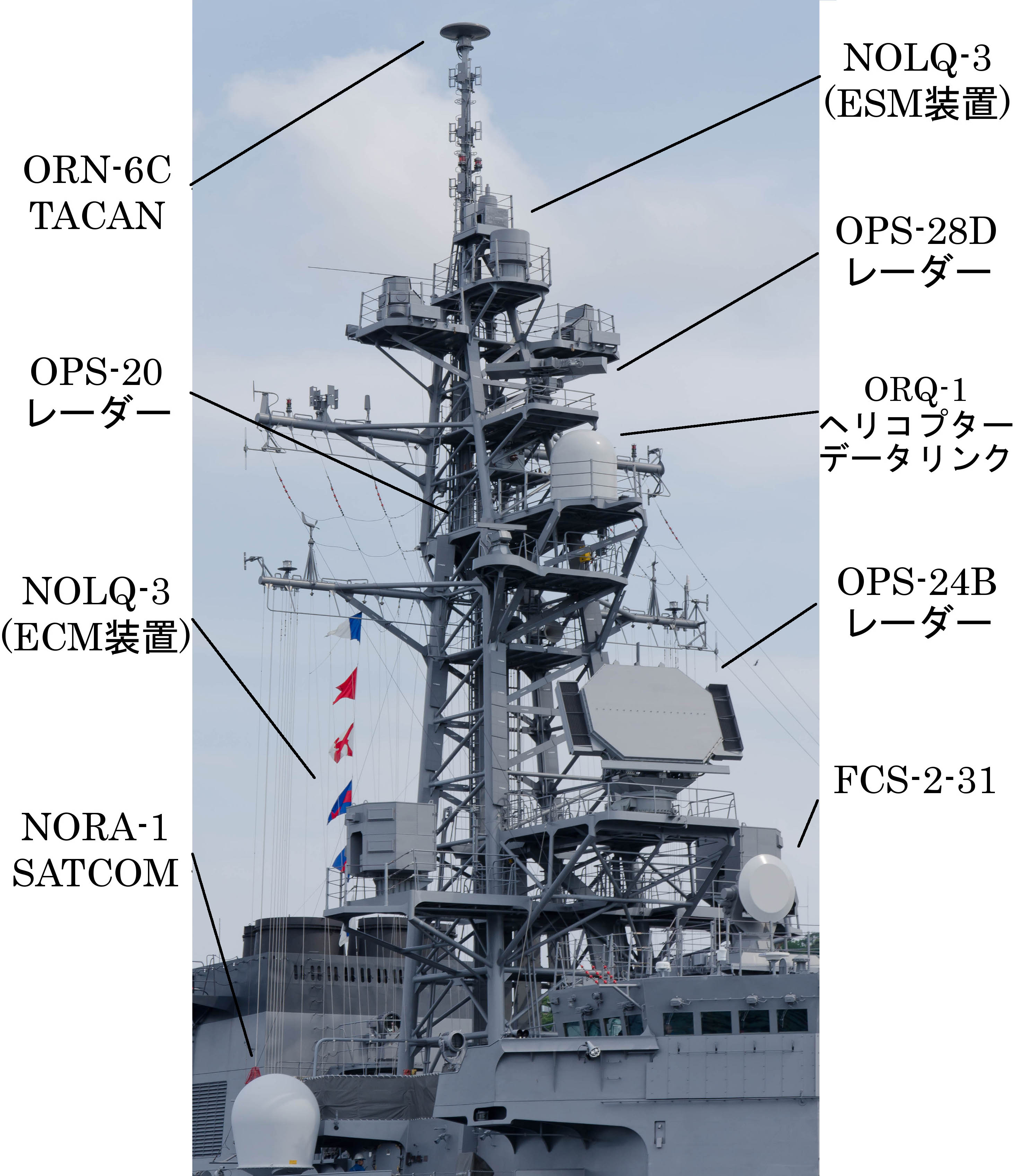
OPS-28D aboard JS Ariake

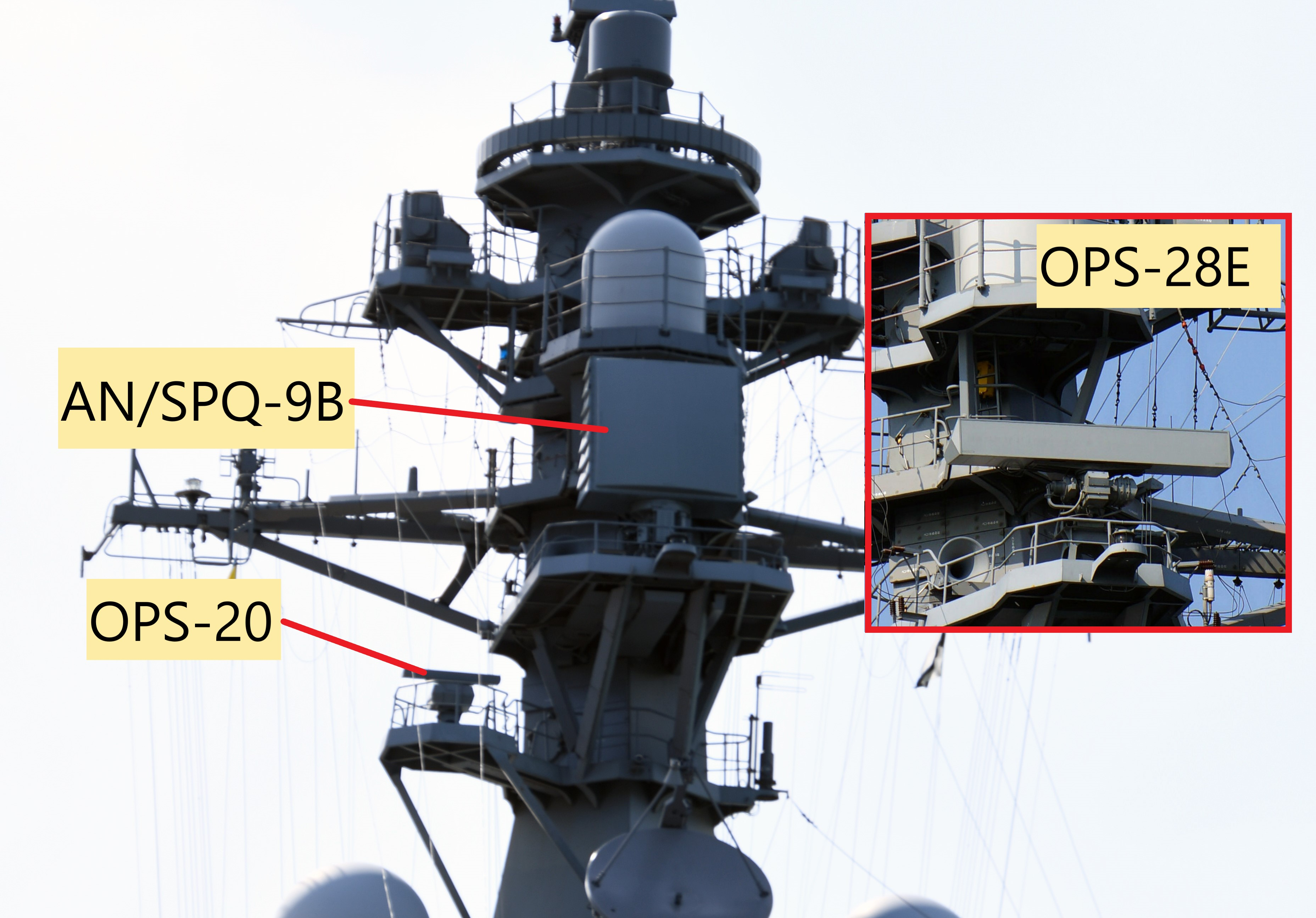
OPS-28E aboard JS Ataga

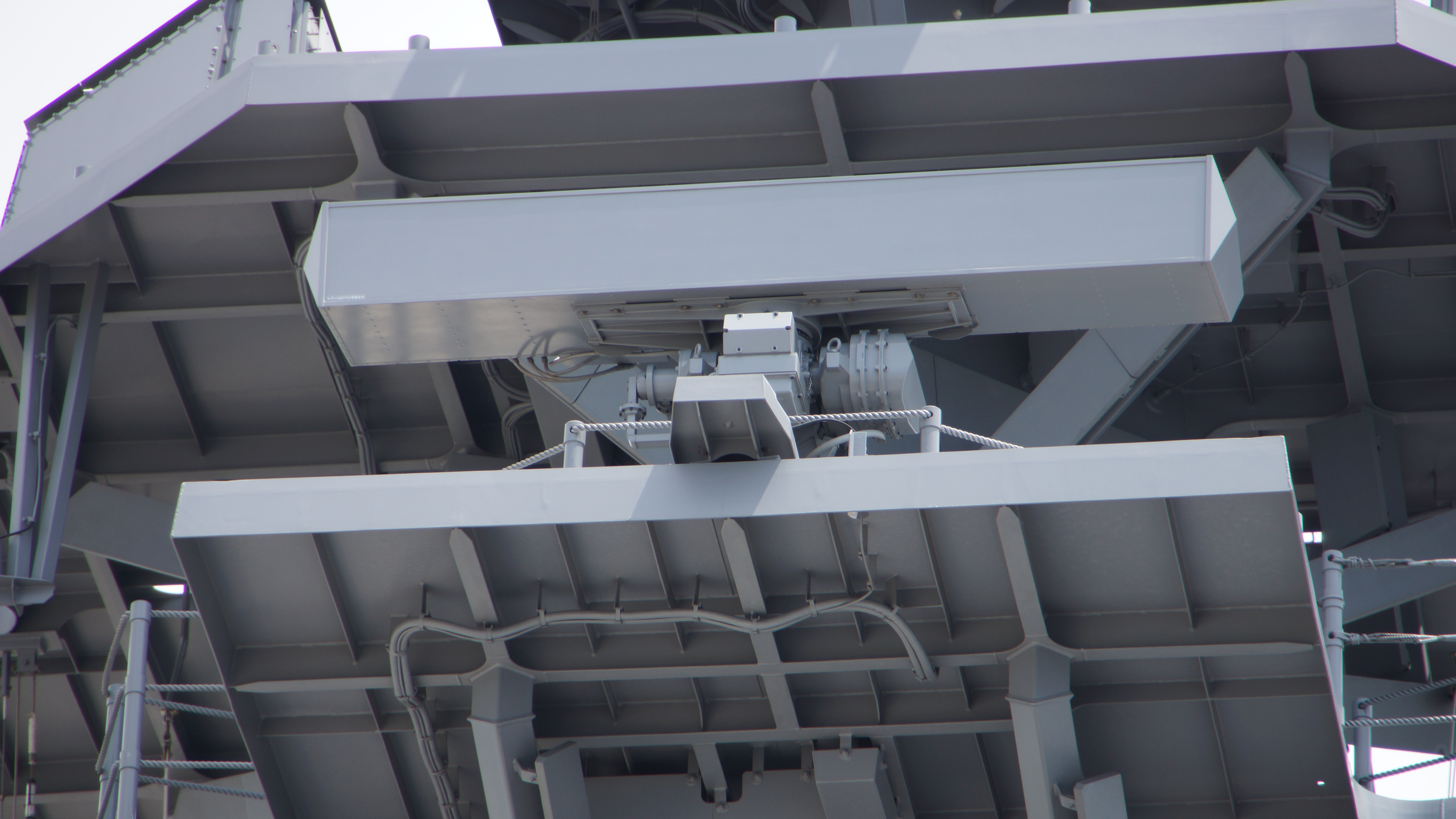
OPS-28F aboard JS Kaga
