= Japan Radio Company =

Japanese electronics firm founded 1915

Japan Radio Co., Ltd.

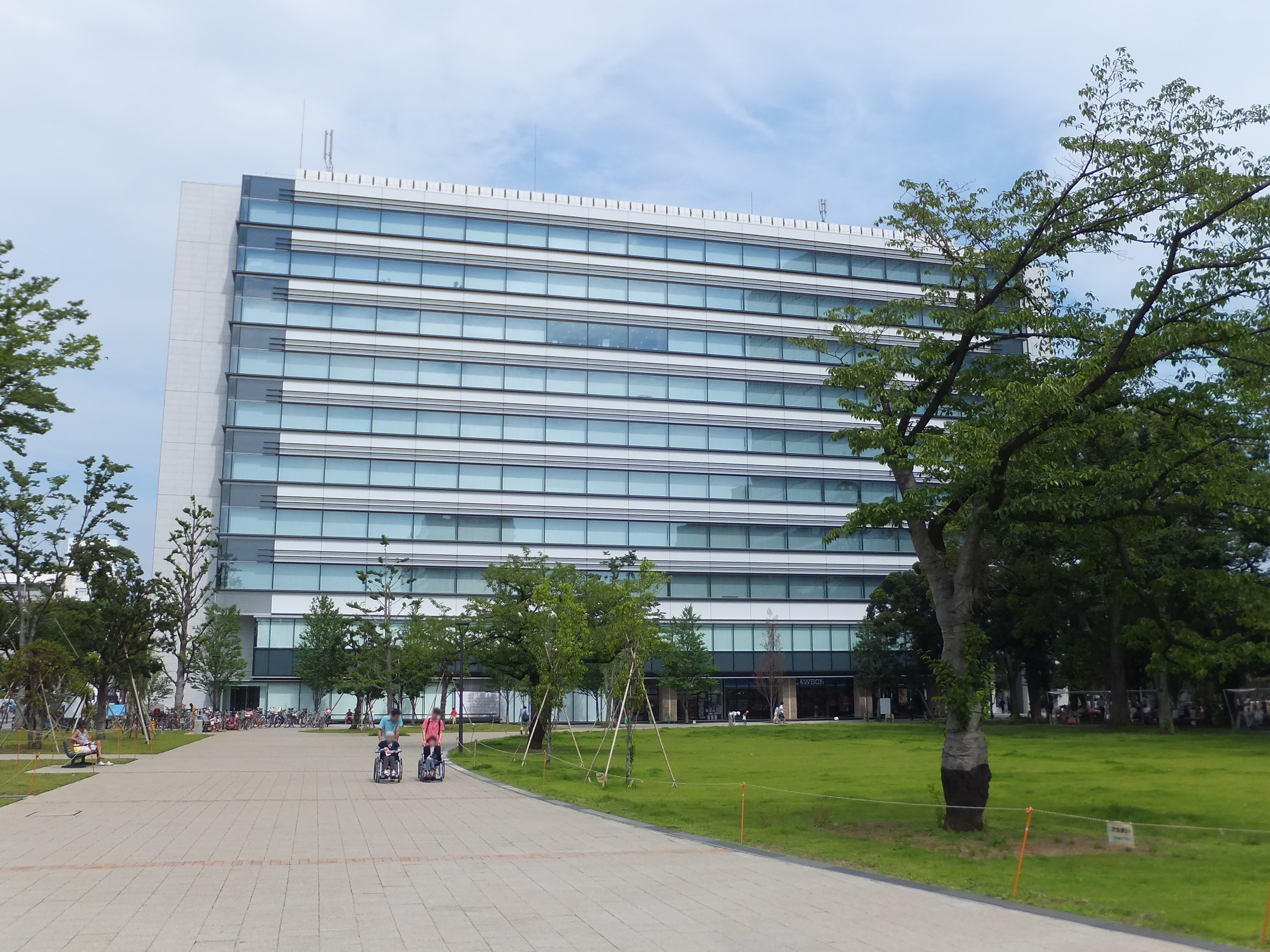
- The company's headquarters
- Native name: 日本無線株式会社
- Type: wholly owned subsidiary of Nisshinbo Holdings Inc.
- Traded as: TYO: 3105
- ISIN: JP3678000005
- Industry: Electronics
- Founded: (December 1915; 110 years ago)
- Headquarters: Nakano Central Park East, Nakano-ku, Tokyo 164-8570, Japan
- Area served: Worldwide
- Key people: Takayoshi Tsuchida (Chairman); Kenji Ara (President)
- Products: Communication systems; Navigation systems; Fishing systems; Broadcasting equipment; Aviation and meteorological systems; Disaster prevention systems; Landslide monitoring systems; Water and river management
- Revenue: JPY 125.1 billion (FY 2015) (US$ 1.1 billion) (FY 2015)
- Net income: JPY 1.6 billion (FY 2015) (US$ 14.7 million) (FY 2015)
- Number of employees: 5,575 (consolidated as of March 31, 2016)
- Website: Official website

Japan Radio Co., Ltd. (日本無線株式会社, Nihon Musen Kabushiki-gaisha) is a Japanese company specialising in the field of Wireless electronics for the communications industry.

== History ==
Established in 1915, the company has produced a wide variety of products including marine electronics, measuring equipment for telecommunication, radio broadcasting equipment, and amateur radio equipment, including the JST-145dx/JST-245dx HF transceivers, which were the last amateur radio transceivers produced by JRC, ending in 2002.

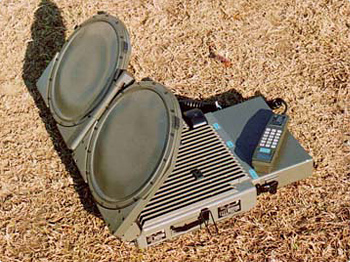
JGSDF JPRC-C1 SATCOM (Satellite Communications) terminal
