= OPS-20 =

Anti-water search radar by Japan Radio

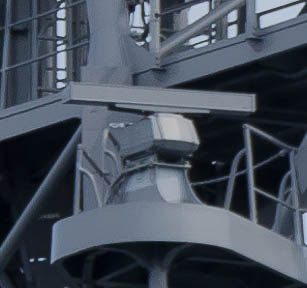
- OPS-20 aboard JS Ariake
- Country of origin: Japan
- Manufacturer: Japan Radio
- Introduced: 1969
- Type: 2D
- Frequency: X band
- Azimuth: Unlimited

OPS-20 is a two-dimensional radar manufactured by Japan Radio. It is compatible with the Global Maritime Distress and Safety System (GMDSS) and installed as an anti-water search radar on the Maritime Self-Defense Force's escort ship. Variations include OPS-20B, OPS-20C and OPS-20E.

The model numbers of the Maritime Self-Defense Force's electronic devices, including this machine, are generally based on the naming rules for military electronic devices of the U.S. military. It is for radar mounted on surface vessels, for detection / distance direction measurement / search.

== Overview ==
In addition, the OPS-20C is adopted by the Hyūga-class helicopter destroyer and Akizuki-class destroyer has been developed as an anti-water search radar, and is composed of two antennas, a main and a sub. Also, by changing the radar wave used from pulse wave to unmodulated continuous wave (CW), the discoverability is reduced.

=== On board ships ===
- Abukuma-class destroyer escort (JS Tone)
- Kongo-class destroyer
- Murasame-class destroyer
- Takanami-class destroyer
- Atago-class destroyer
- Hyūga-class helicopter destroyer
- Akizuki-class destroyer
- Izumo-class helicopter destroyer
- Ōsumi-class tank landing ship
- Uraga-class mine countermeasure vessel
- Hayabusa-class patrol boat
- JS Kashima
- JS Chihaya
- Towada-class replenishment ship
- Mashū-class replenishment ship
- JS Nichinan
- JS Tenryū

== Gallery ==
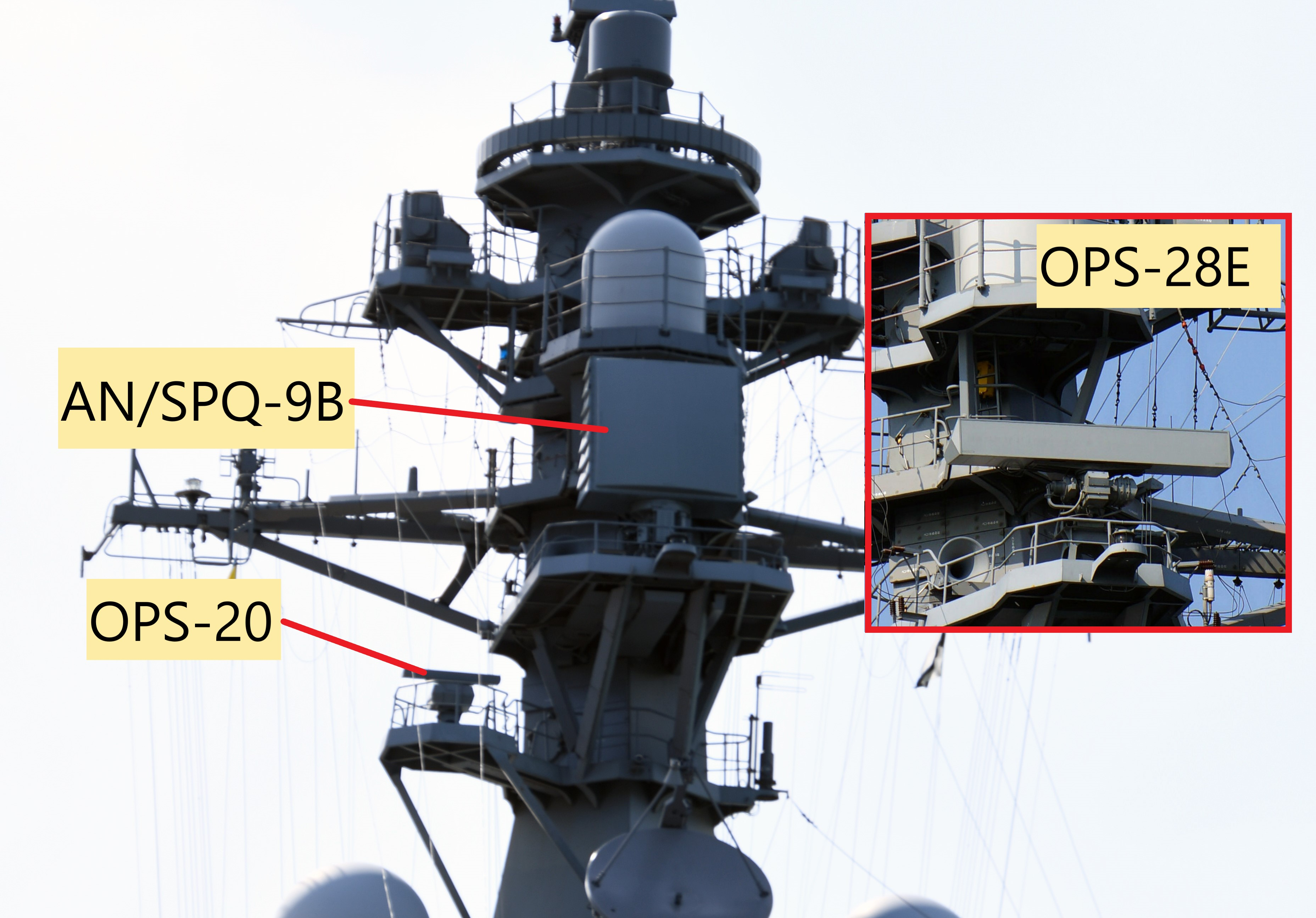
OPS-20 aboard JS Ataga

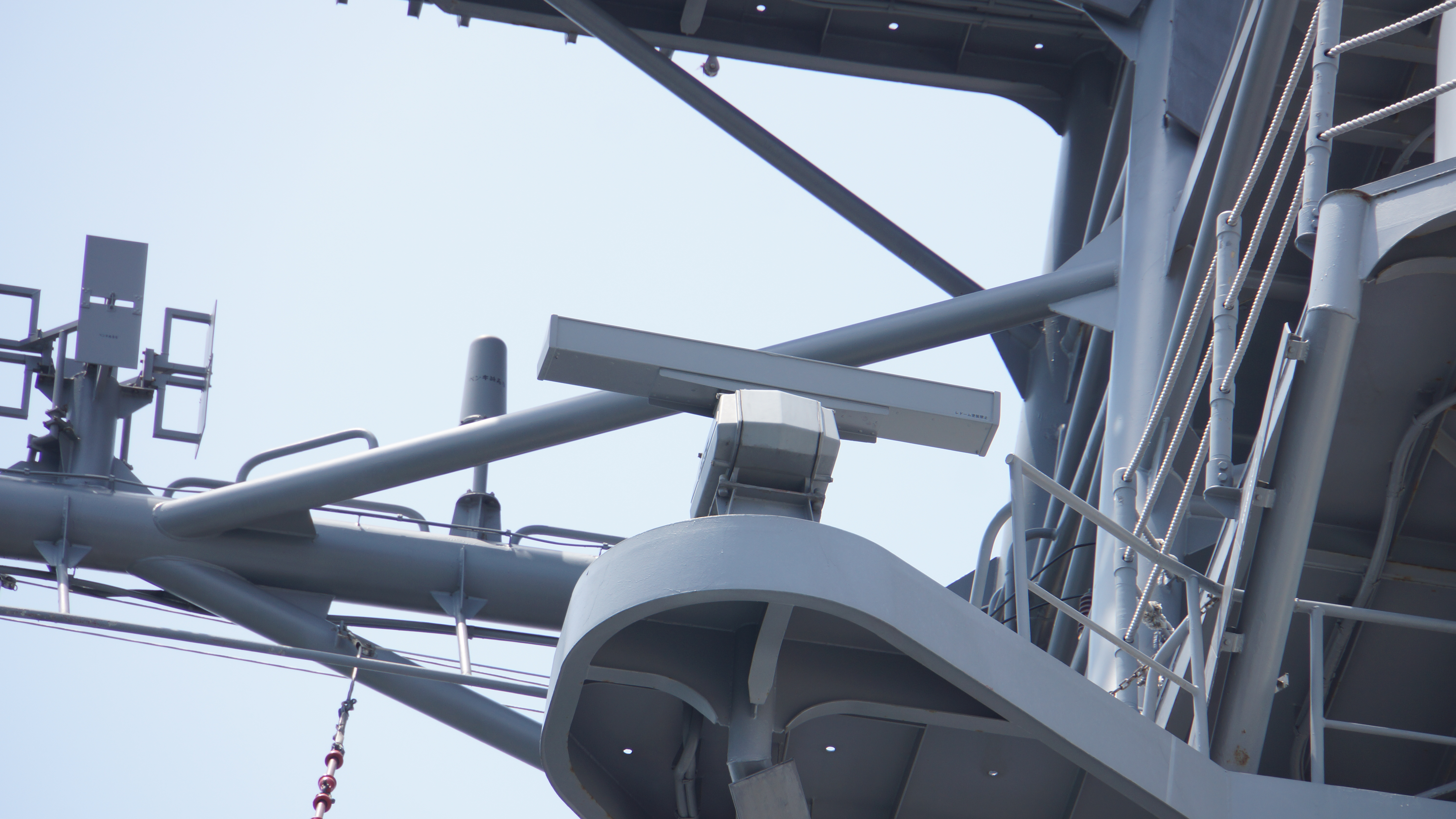
OPS-20B aboard JS Kirisame

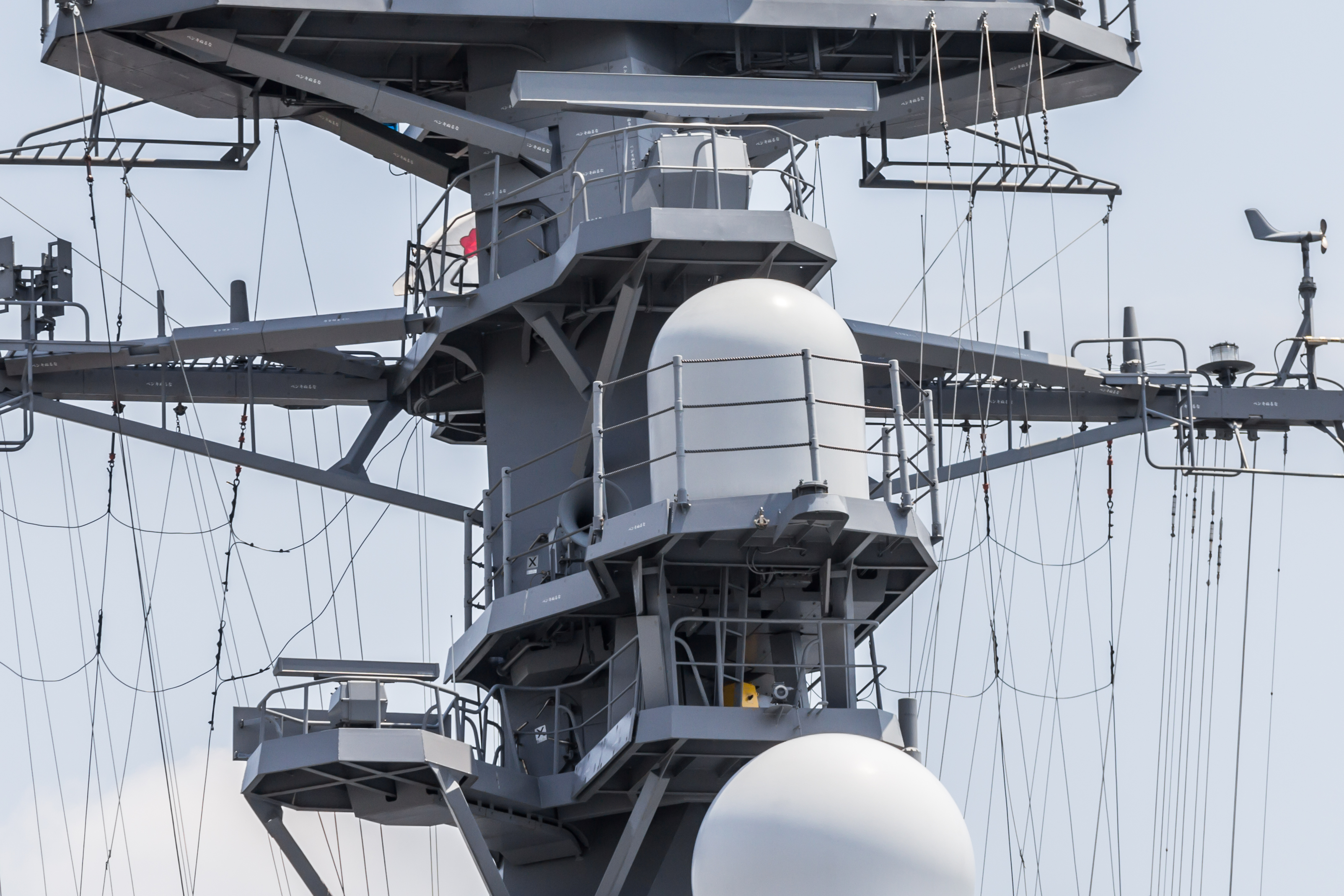
OPS-20C abaoard JS Akizuki

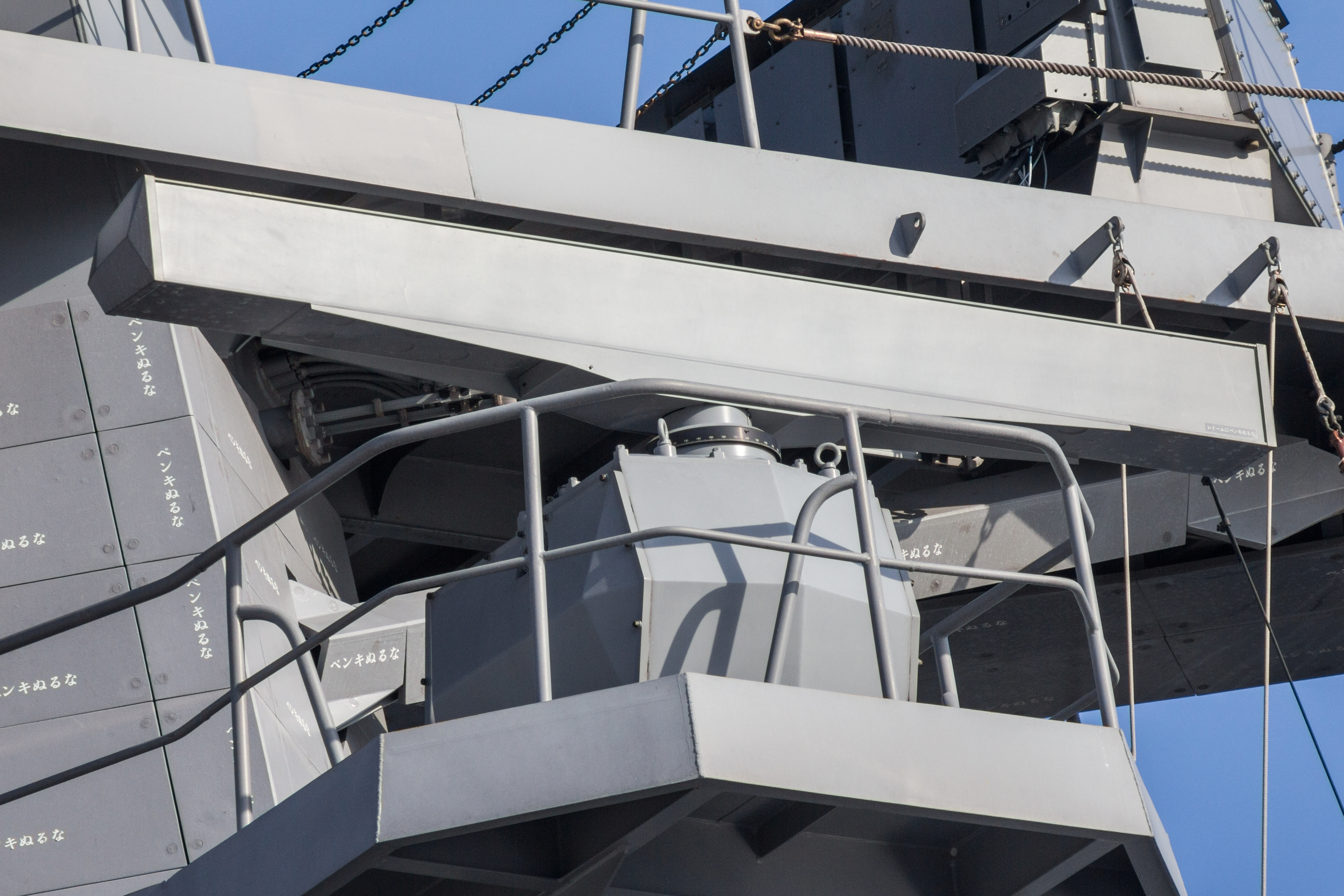
OPS-20C aboard JS Teruzuki
