= Takanami-class destroyer =

Destroyer class in the Japanese Maritime Self-Defense Forces

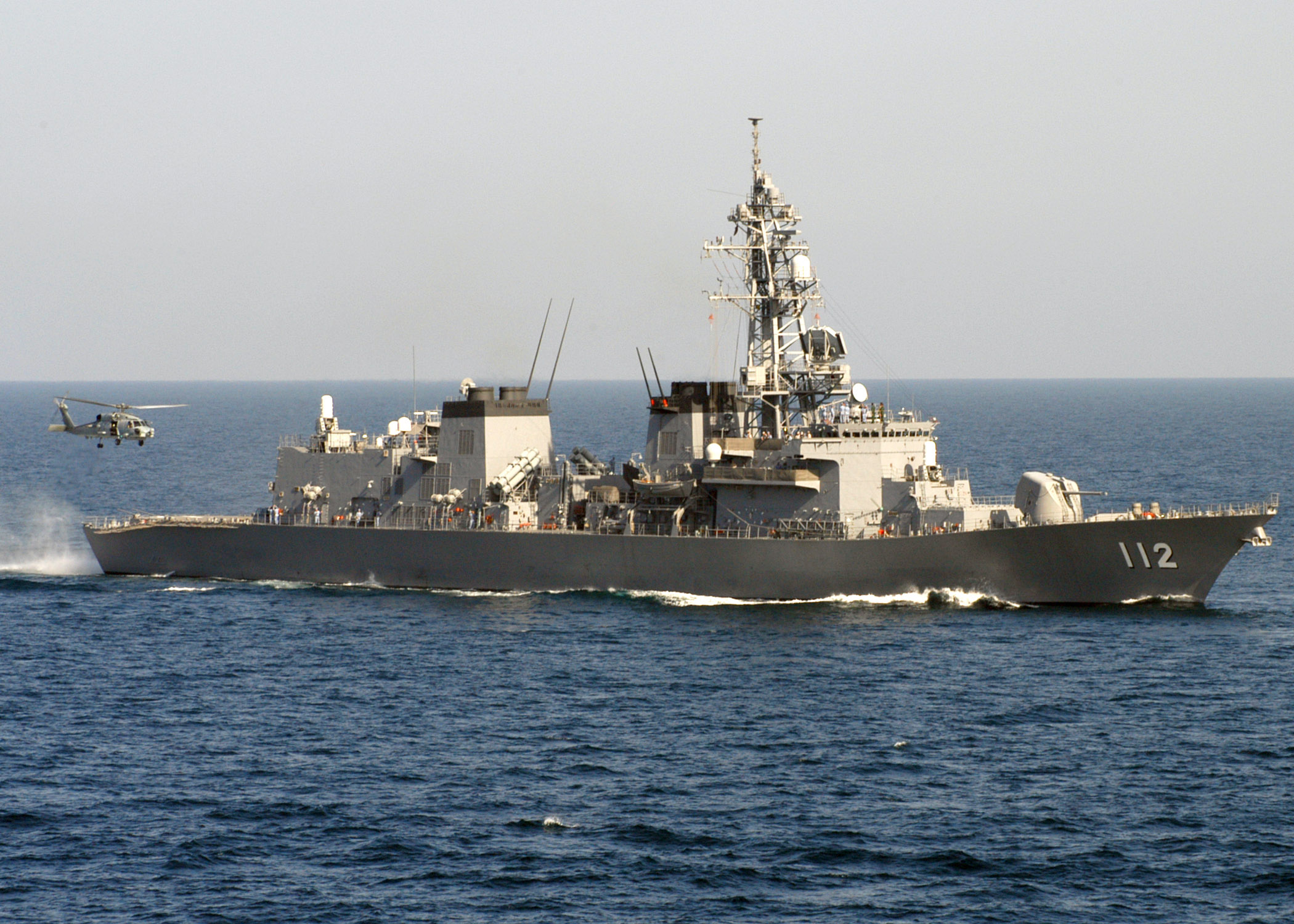
- JS Makinami

Class overview
- Name: Takanami-class destroyer
- Builders: Mitsubishi Heavy Industries; Nagasaki shipyard (2); IHI Marine United; Yokohama Shipyard (2); Uraga Shipyard (1)
- Operators: Japan Maritime Self-Defense Force
- Preceded by: Murasame class
- Succeeded by: Akizuki class
- Built: 2000–2004
- In commission: 2003–present
- Completed: 5
- Active: 5

General characteristics
- Type: General-purpose destroyer
- Displacement: 4,650 long tons (4,725 t) standard; 6,300 long tons (6,401 t) full load
- Length: 151 m (495 ft 5 in)
- Beam: 17.4 m (57 ft 1 in)
- Height: 10.9 m (35 ft 9 in)
- Draft: 5.3 m (17 ft 5 in)
- Propulsion: 2 × Ishikawajima Harima LM-2500 gas turbines; 2 × Kawasaki Rolls-Royce Spey SM1C gas turbines; 60,000 shp (45 MW); 2 shafts
- Speed: 30 knots (56 km/h; 35 mph)
- Complement: 175
- Sensors & processing systems: OPS-25B radar; OPS-28D surface-search radar; OPS-20 navigational radar; OQS-5 sonar; UQR-2 towed sonar; Type 81 fire-control system
- Electronic warfare & decoys: NOLQ-3 ECM system; 4 × Mk137 chaff dispensers
- Armament: 1 × Otobreda 127 mm/54 gun; 2 × missile canister up to 8 Type 90 (SSM-1B); 2 × 20 mm Phalanx CIWS; 2 × Type 68 triple torpedo tubes; VLS Mk 41 (32 cells); • Evolved Sea Sparrow SAM; • RUM-139 VL ASROC
- Aircraft carried: 1 × SH-60J(K) anti-submarine helicopter
- Aviation facilities: Hangar and helipad

The Takanami-class destroyer (たかなみ型護衛艦, Takanami-gata-goei-kan) is a class of destroyer serving with the Japan Maritime Self-Defense Force (JMSDF). This warship is the slightly modified class of second-generation, general-purpose destroyers of the JMSDF.

== Background ==
Since FY1991, the JMSDF started construction of the second-generation, general-purpose destroyers (汎用護衛艦, Hanyou-goei-kan), Murasame class. These destroyers are generally satisfactory for the fleet, but there is some discontent. From FY1998 onwards, a slightly modified version that corrected these dissatisfaction points was to be built: Takanami class.

== Design ==
The hull design is generally based on that of the Murasame class. However, the weapons mounted are different, and as a result, the internal structure has also been changed. The large lattice mast affected the stealthiness of the Murasame class, so in Takanami class, it was planned to change to two small masts, but that was not implemented.

Although their displacement become slightly increased, there was no change to their main engines, as it was not a big difference so it had little effect on the performance of the ship.

== Equipment ==
The combat system was slightly improved. The combat direction system is similar to the Murasame class in the first three ships, but in the fourth ship, workstations were changed to AN/UYQ-70, and in the fifth ship, it corresponded to the communication in Link 16. Radars are the same as those of Murasame class, sonars are also small revision type.

In terms of weaponry, instead of the 3-inch gun that has been adopted by conventional destroyers, a larger Oto Melara 127 mm gun was introduced. Although vertical launching systems were divided into two places in the Murasame class, 16-cell Mk 41 for VL-ASROC on the bow deck and 16-cell Mk 48 for Sea Sparrow (later replaced with Evolved Sea Sparrow) on the middle deck, they are compiled in one place, 32-cell Mk 41 on the bow deck in this class.

== Ships in the class ==
Pennant no.	Name	Laid down	Launched	Commissioned	Builder	Homeport
DD-110	Takanami (Tall Waves)	25 April 2000	26 July 2001	12 March 2003	IHI, Uraga, Kanagawa	Yokosuka
DD-111	Ōnami (Large Wave)	17 May 2000	20 September 2001	13 March 2003	Mitsubishi, Nagasaki	Yokosuka
DD-112	Makinami (Rolling Waves)	17 July 2001	8 August 2002	18 March 2004	IHI, Uraga, Kanagawa	Ōminato
DD-113	Sazanami (Ripples on the Water)	4 April 2002	29 August 2003	16 February 2005	Mitsubishi, Nagasaki	Kure
DD-114	Suzunami (Breaking Waves)	24 September 2003	26 August 2004	16 February 2006	IHI, Uraga, Kanagawa	Ōminato

== See also ==
- List of destroyer classes in service

Equivalent destroyers of the same era

- Type 052B
- Chungmugong Yi Sun-sin class
