= CVS =

CVS or CVs may refer to:

== Organizations ==
- CVS Health, a U.S. pharmacy chain
  - CVS Pharmacy, a subsidiary of CVS Health (originally named the Consumer Value Stores from 1963–1969)
  - CVS Caremark, a prescription benefit management subsidiary
- Council for Voluntary Service, England
- Cable Video Store, a former U.S. pay-per-view service
- CVS Ferrari, an Italian mobile handling equipment manufacturer
- Chicago Vocational High School, United States

== Science ==
- Cardiovascular system
- Cyclic vomiting syndrome
- Chorionic villus sampling, a form of prenatal testing
- Computer vision syndrome, from excessive computer display use
- CVS (enzyme), the enzyme responsible for the biosynthesis of valencene
- Coversine, in mathematics

== Technology ==
- Computer-controlled Vehicle System, a personal rapid transit system developed in Japan
- Concurrent Versions System, a revision control system for software development
- Crankcase ventilation system, a system for allowing engine blow-by gases to escape

== Other uses ==
- Anti-submarine warfare carrier, U.S. hull classification symbol CVS
- C. V. S. Rao (1918–1993), a senior officer in the Indian police
- Curriculum vitae
