= Japanese ship Hyūga =

At least two warships of Japan have borne the name Hyūga:

- Japanese battleship Hyūga, was an Ise-class battleship launched in 1917 and sunk in 1945
- JS Hyūga, is a Hyūga-class helicopter destroyer launched in 2007
