= Ferrari Belotti =

Ferrari Belotti S.p.A.
- Type: Subsidiary
- Industry: Heavy equipment
- Founded: 1947
- Founder: Giovanni Belotti
- Headquarters: Italy
- Products: Machinery
- Parent: CVS Ferrari

Ferrari Belotti SpA is an Italian company that manufactures materials handling equipment.

The company was founded in 1947 as Belotti Handling SpA and was the first company to build mobile handling equipment specifically designed for ports. This originated from their manufacturing facility on Ponte Canepa wharf, Genoa. In 1952 Belotti manufactured the first crane able to lift and transport military aircraft. In 1967 Belotti introduced the first container handling straddle carrier with side lifting capability. The first 100 tonne capacity aircraft transporter was supplied in 1967. Belotti has since then delivered machines to armed forces worldwide.

After going into receivership, Belotti was bought by C.V.S. (another Italian company) in July 2002 and the company was renamed Ferrari Belotti S.p.A.
