= JS Hyūga =

Japanese helicopter destroyer

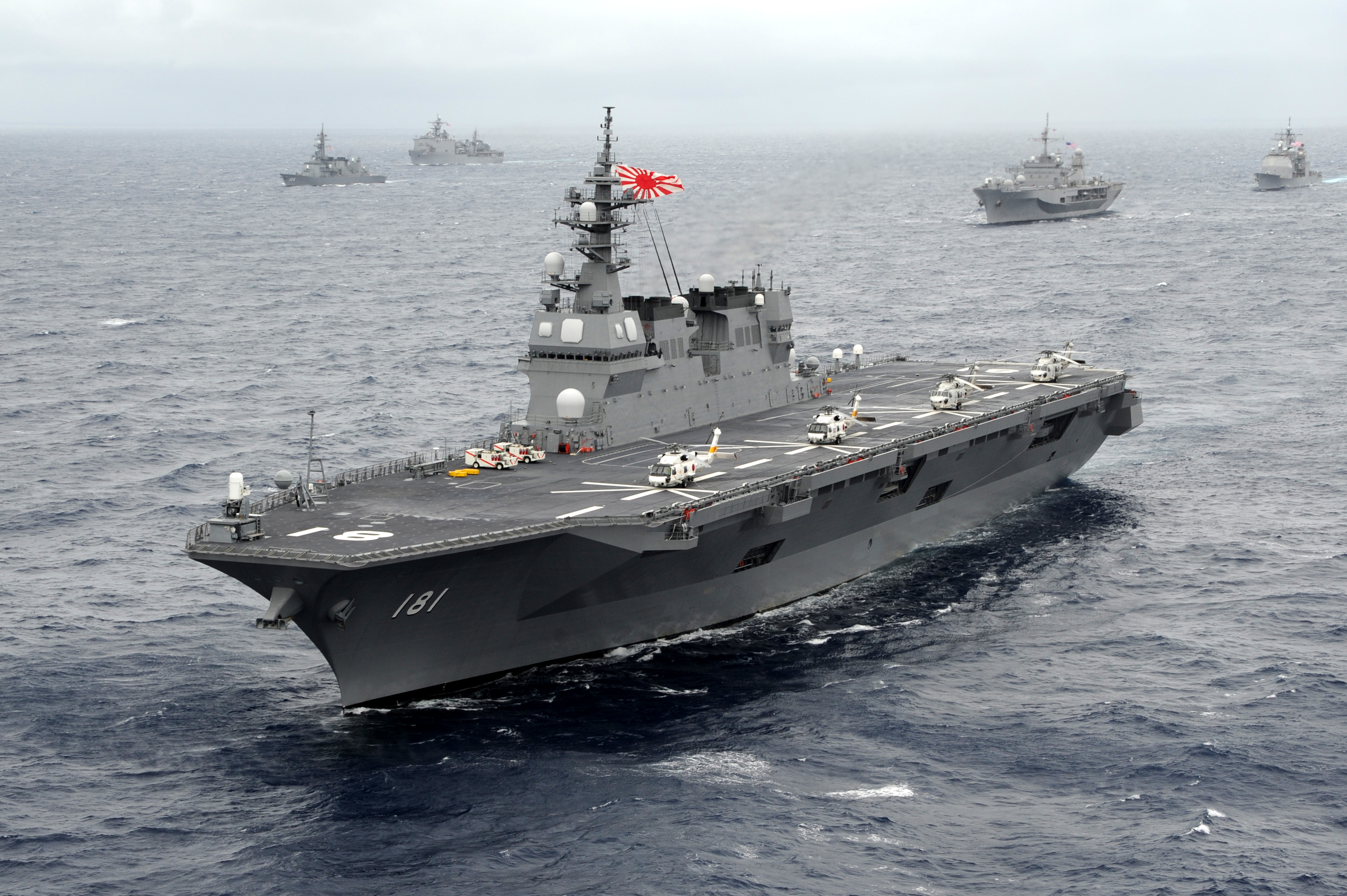
- JS Hyūga

History

Japan
- Name: Hyūga; (ひゅうが)
- Namesake: Hyūga Province
- Ordered: 2004
- Builder: IHI, Yokohama
- Laid down: 11 May 2006
- Launched: 23 August 2007
- Commissioned: 18 March 2009
- Home port: Maizuru
- Identification: MMSI number: 431999693; Callsign: JSNI; Pennant number: DDH-181
- Status: Active

General characteristics
- Class & type: Hyūga-class helicopter destroyer
- Displacement: 13,950 long tons (14,170 t) standard; 19,000 long tons (19,000 t) full load
- Length: 197 m (646 ft 4 in)
- Beam: 33 m (108 ft 3 in)
- Propulsion: COGAG, two shafts, 100,000 hp (75,000 kW)
- Speed: more than 30 knots (56 km/h; 35 mph)
- Sensors & processing systems: ATECS (advanced technology command system); OYQ-10 advanced combat direction system; FCS-3 AAW system; OQQ-21 ASW system; NOLQ-3C EW system; OPS-20C surface search radar
- Armament: 16 cells Mk 41 VLS; 16 ESSM; 12 RUM-139 VL ASROC; 2 × 20 mm Phalanx CIWS; 2 × triple 324 mm torpedo tubes; 12.7 mm machine guns
- Aircraft carried: 3 × SH-60K, 1 × MCH-101; 18 aircraft maximum
- Aviation facilities: Flight deck, hangar deck

JS Hyūga (DDH-181) is the lead ship of the Hyūga-class helicopter destroyers of the Japan Maritime Self-Defense Force (JMSDF).

== Development and design ==
They are sometimes referred to as an aircraft carrier (helicopter carrier) from the ship's type of flight deck, but officially follows the predecessor Haruna-class destroyer, and as they are also a helicopter destroyer. In addition to advanced command and control capabilities, the ship itself has powerful anti-submarine and anti-aircraft combat capabilities due to the vertical launch system that can launch anti-submarine and anti-aircraft missiles and the newly developed C4ISTAR system. Instead, the function as an escort ship that can perform anti-submarine warfare with its own equipment is also emphasized. This point is one of the features that is significantly different from the Izumo-class helicopter destroyer, which specializes in on-board helicopter operation, with only the minimum weapons for self-defense (two each for close-range air defense missiles and high-performance 20 mm machine guns).

They have the ability to operate a large number of helicopters at the same time due to its vast full deck and large hull volume. As a result, it has superior zone anti-submarine warfare capability than conventional helicopter-equipped destroyers, and can also handle transport helicopters and rescue helicopters. Respond to various missions such as support.

Since the hull size is larger than some conventional light aircraft carriers and amphibious assault ships, it may be compared with light aircraft carriers that operate STOVL aircraft such as the F-35 and Harrier, but the Ministry of Defense says The operation of the fixed-wing aircraft in the model has not been officially announced, and Yoji Koda, a former self-defense fleet commander, states that the ship is completely different in nature from the aircraft carrier.

== Construction and career ==
The ship was laid down on 11 May 2006 and launched on 23 August 2007 by IHI Marine United and commissioned into military service on 18 March 2009.

On 5 September 2009, medical verification was conducted at the port of Yokohama using helicopters from local governments, police, fire departments, the Ground Self-Defense Force, and the Japan Coast Guard. In October of the same year, she participated in the Maritime Self-Defense Force observing ceremony for the first time as a censored ship. She participated in the Annualex 21G Exercise (2009 Maritime Self-Defense Force Exercise), a bilateral exercise with the US Navy from 10 to 18 November of the same year.

This ship delivered supplies and undertook disaster relief operations after the 2011 Tōhoku earthquake and tsunami.

Around 17:00 on 10 February 2012, four Chinese Navy Type 054A and Type 053H2G frigates, Changzhou, Tongling, Jiaxing, and Lianyungang, which were sailing about 110 kilometres (68 mi) northeast of Miyakojima, were discovered by Hyūga.

She became the first Japanese vessel to have an American MV-22 Osprey land aboard the ship during exercise Dawn Blitz in San Diego, California on 14 June 2013. On 25 March 2015, the vessel's home port was transferred to Maizuru after being transferred to the 3rd Escort Corps of the 3rd Escort Corps by reorganization. Hyūga participated in the integrated training Dawn Blitz 15 held in the United States from 18 August to 9 September 2015 with Ashigara and Kunisaki under the command of the Mine Warfare Force.

Hyūga was deployed in the Yatsushiro Sea to support the areas affected by the Kumamoto earthquake that occurred in April 2016, and served as a base for accumulating supplies and operating bases for helicopters. On 19 April, the US Marine Corps vertical takeoff and landing transport aircraft MV-22 Osprey, which supports transportation, landed on board, loaded with relief supplies such as water, food, and simple toilets, and airlifted to Minamiaso Village. Hyūga participated in the Japan-US-India joint training (MALABAR 2016) held in the waters east of Okinawa from 10 to 17 June 2016, and then sailed to Hawaii with JS Chōkai until 23 August. After that she participated in the US dispatch training (RIMPAC 2016) conducted in the sea and airspace around the west coast of the United States. In June 2017, Hyūga, alongside JS Ashigara joined the US Navy's Carrier Strike Group 1 and Carrier Strike Group 5 off the Korean Peninsula in response to increased tensions over North Korea's nuclear weapons program.

From 8 to 24 May 2018, she participated in the Amphibious Rapid Deployment Brigade Exercise in the waters west of Kyushu, Tanegashima, Kagoshima Prefecture, and the surrounding waters with the JS Shimokita. From the Ground Self-Defense Force, the Amphibious Rapid Deployment Brigade, the 1st Helicopter Corps, the Western Air Corps, etc. On 14 October of the same year, assuming a huge Nankai Trough earthquake, a Japan-US joint disaster prevention drill was held in Shirahama Town, Wakayama Prefecture. From 27 November to 5 December of the same year, Japan-US joint cruising training was conducted with the aircraft carrier USS Ronald Reagan and several other ships in the sea and airspace from around the Bashi Channel to the south of the Kantō region. From 15 to 17 December 2020, Japan-US-France joint training was conducted with the USS John S. McCain, P-8A, and the French Navy submarine Émeraude in the sea and airspace around Okinotorishima.

Between 4-8 November 2023, Hyūga participated in a Multi-Large Deck Event, with Carl Vinson and Ronald Reagan and their task force ships, in the Philippine Sea.

Between 10 and 18 November, Hyūga participated in the 2025 edition of Exercise Malabar along with INS Sahyadri, HMAS Ballarat and USS Fitzgerald of the Indian Navy, Australian Navy and US Navy. The formation of ships was supported by a P-8A Poseidon aircraft of the Australian Air Force which was deployed from the Andersen Air Force Base.The exercise included complex drills in anti-submarine warfare, air defence and replenishment at sea. The harbour phase was conducted on 10–12 November at Naval Base Guam followed by the Sea Phase on 13–17 November in the west Pacific training area.

Currently, she is assigned to the 3rd Escort Group, 3rd Escort Corps, and the home port is Maizuru.

== Gallery ==
JS Hyūga

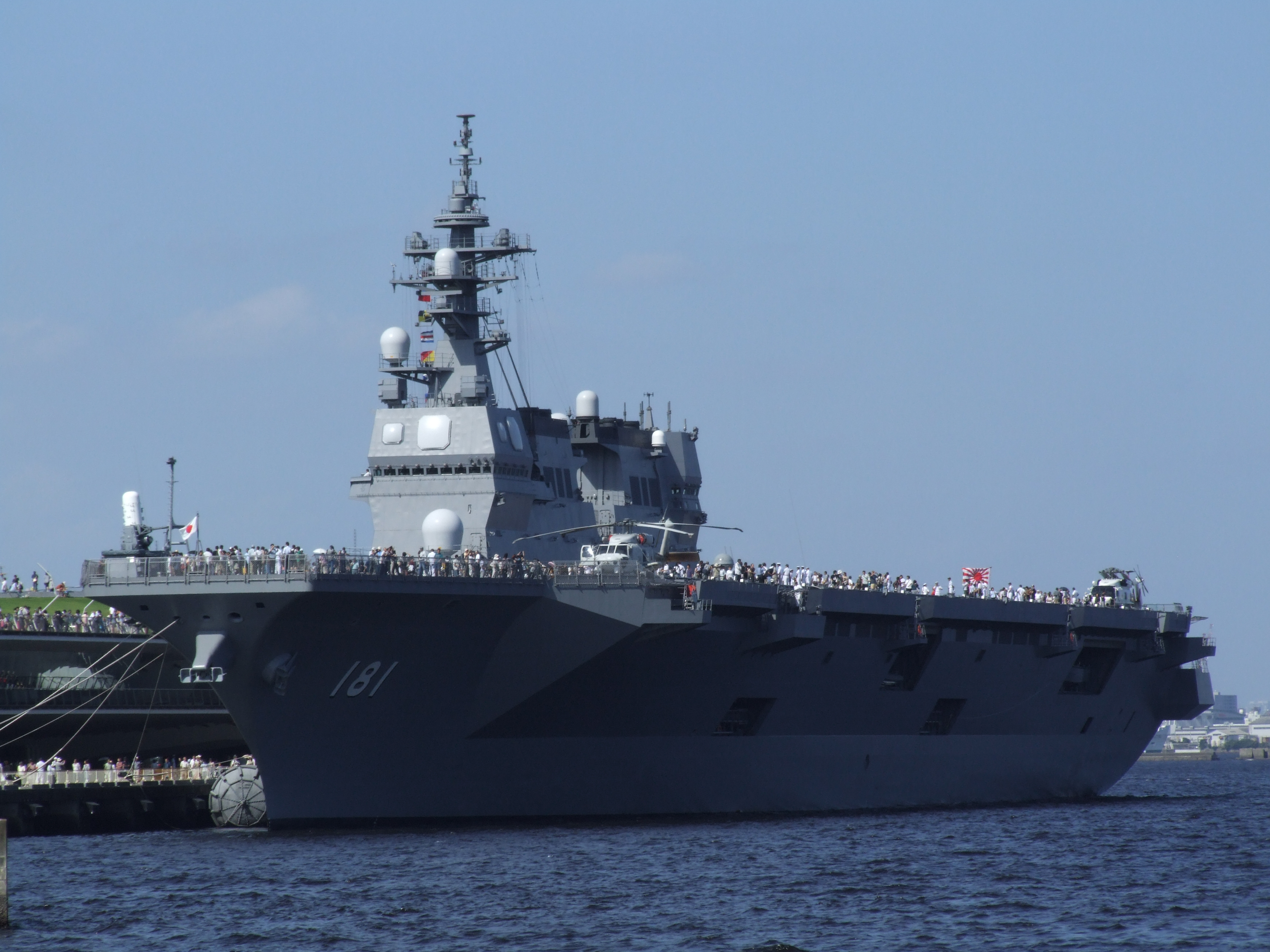
JS Hyūga docked at Yokohama on 6 September 2009.

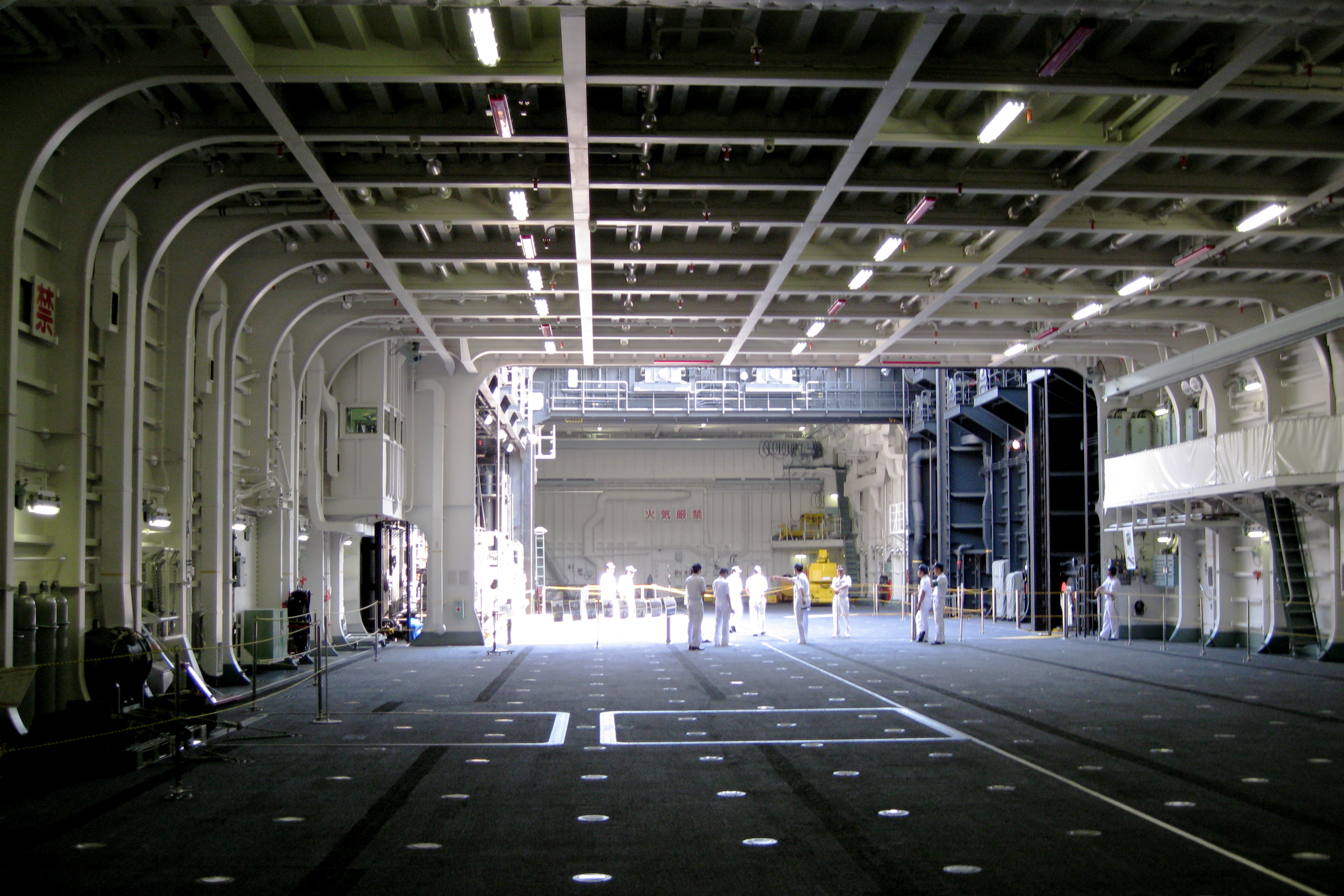
JS Hyūga's elevator on 6 September 2009.

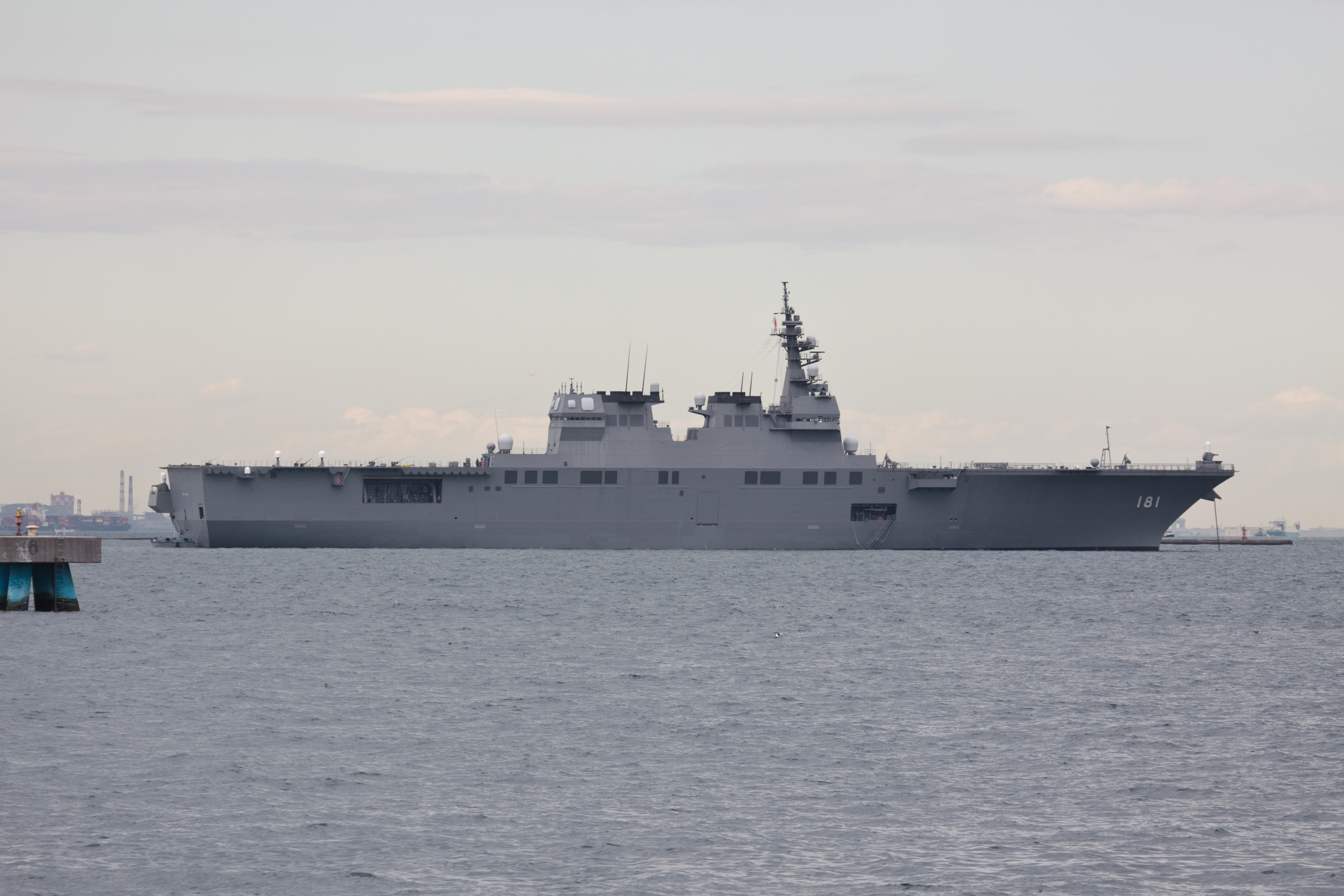
JS Hyūga on 9 October 2009.

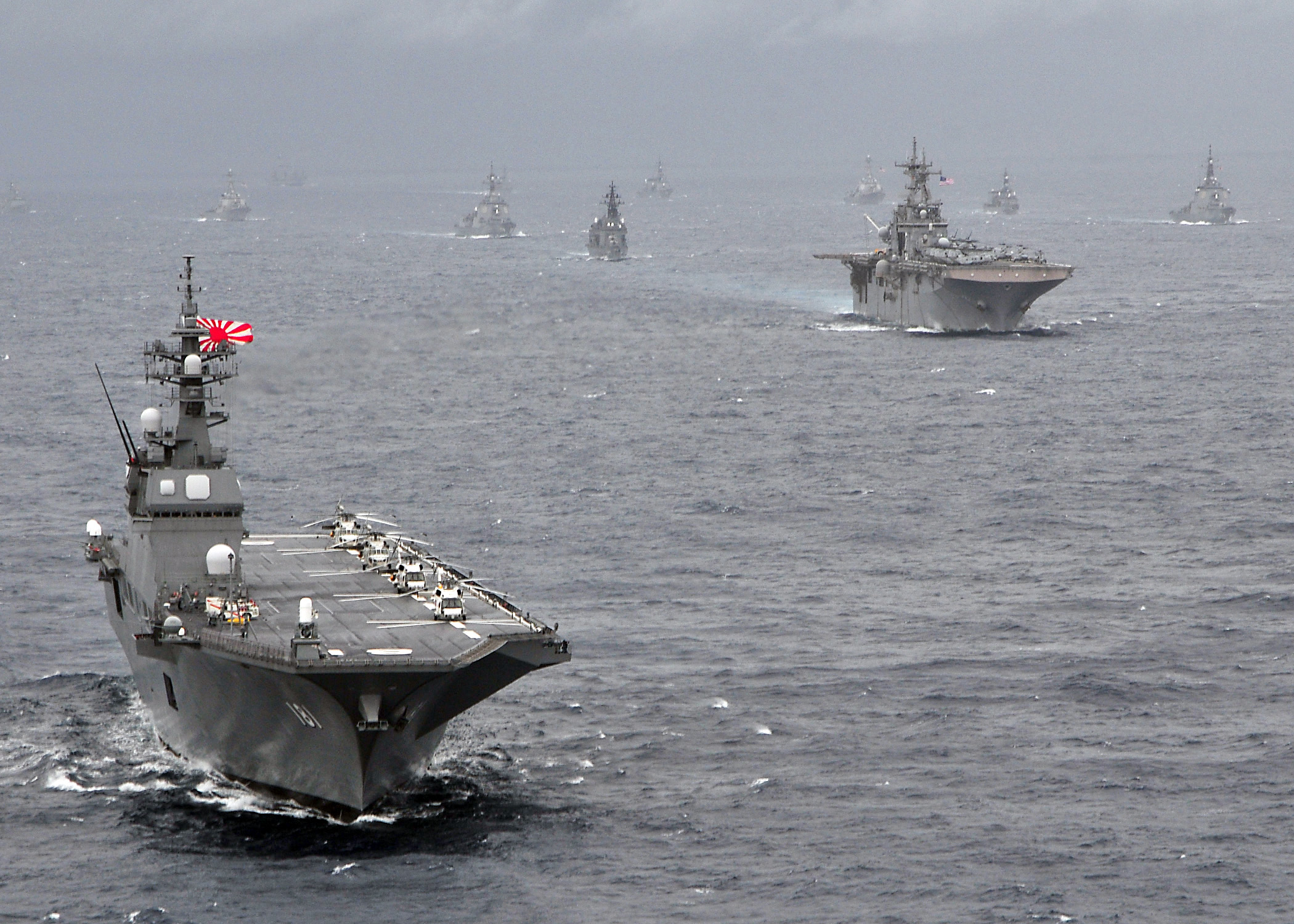
JS Hyūga on 17 November 2009.

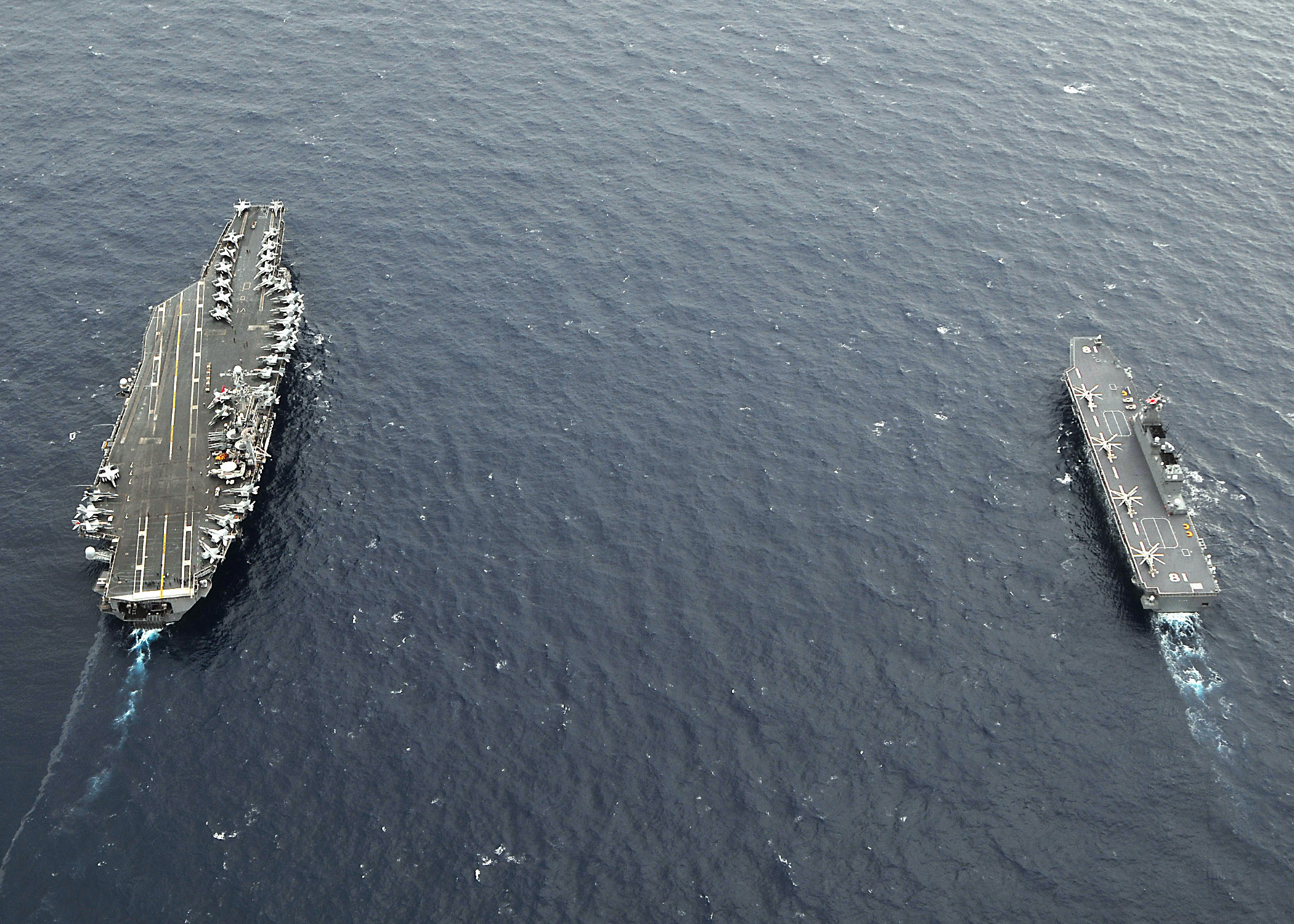
JS Hyūga and USS George Washington on 17 November 2009.

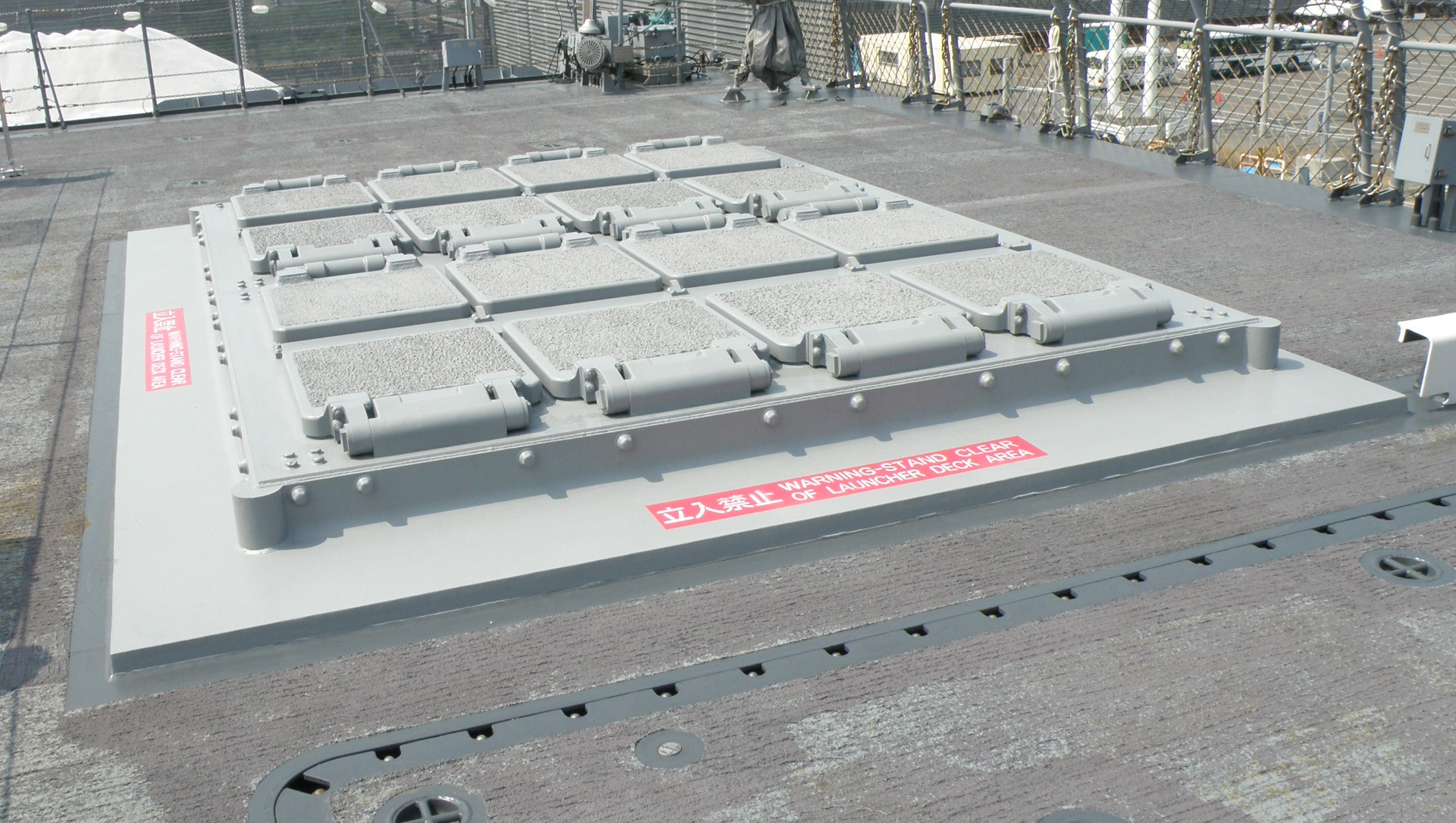
JS Hyūga's Mk.41 VLS on 22 August 2010.

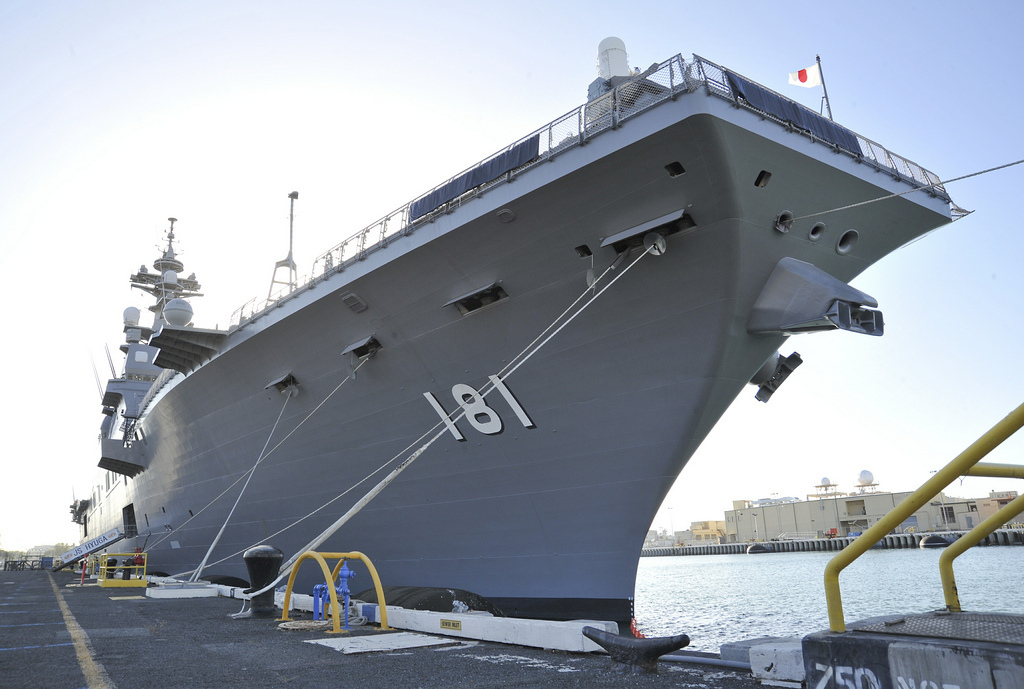
JS Hyūga in Pearl Harbor on 16 May 2013.

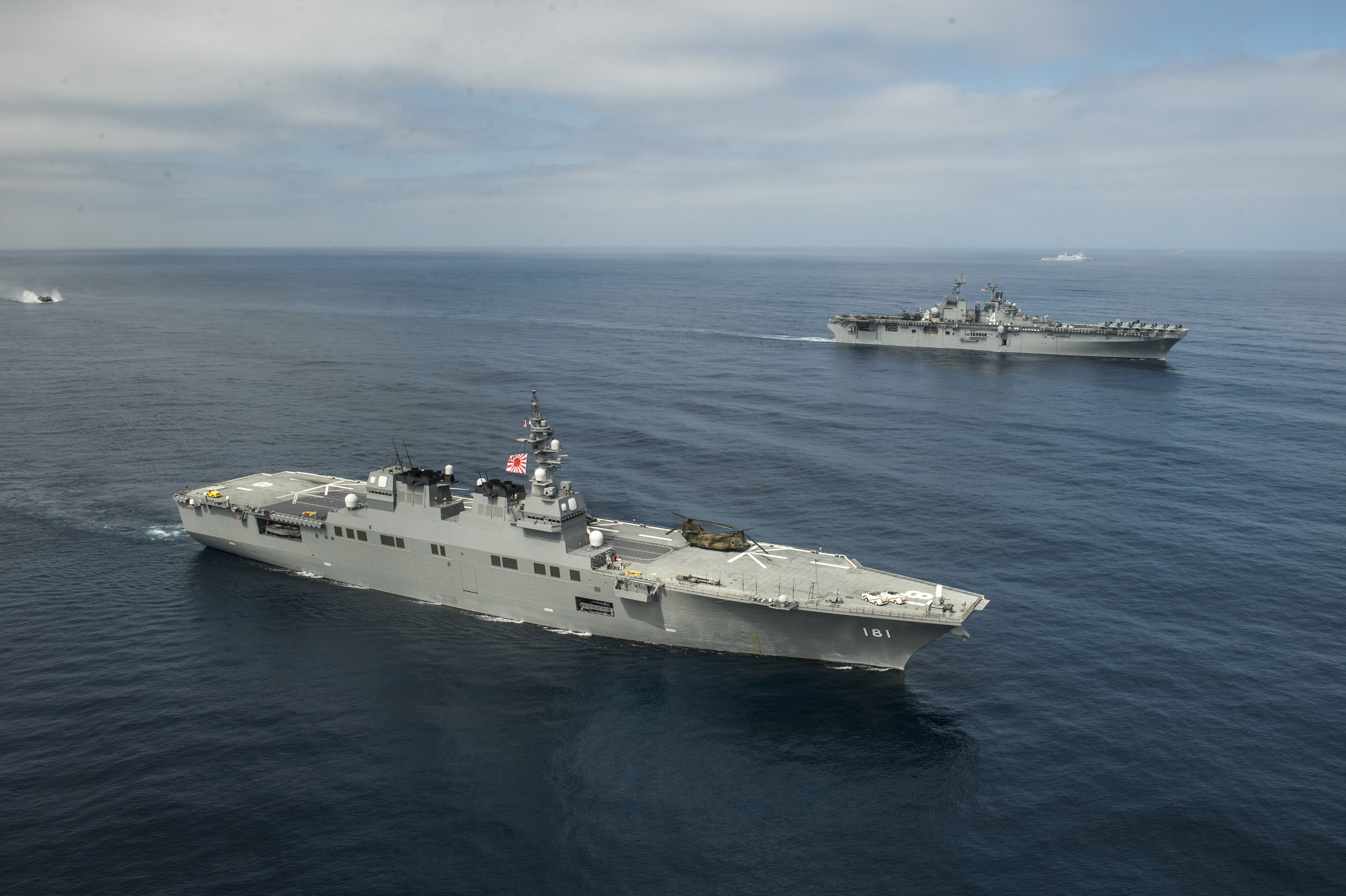
JS Hyūga sails with USS Boxer, 12 June 2013

USMC MV-22B Osprey aboard JS Hyūga on 13 June 2013.

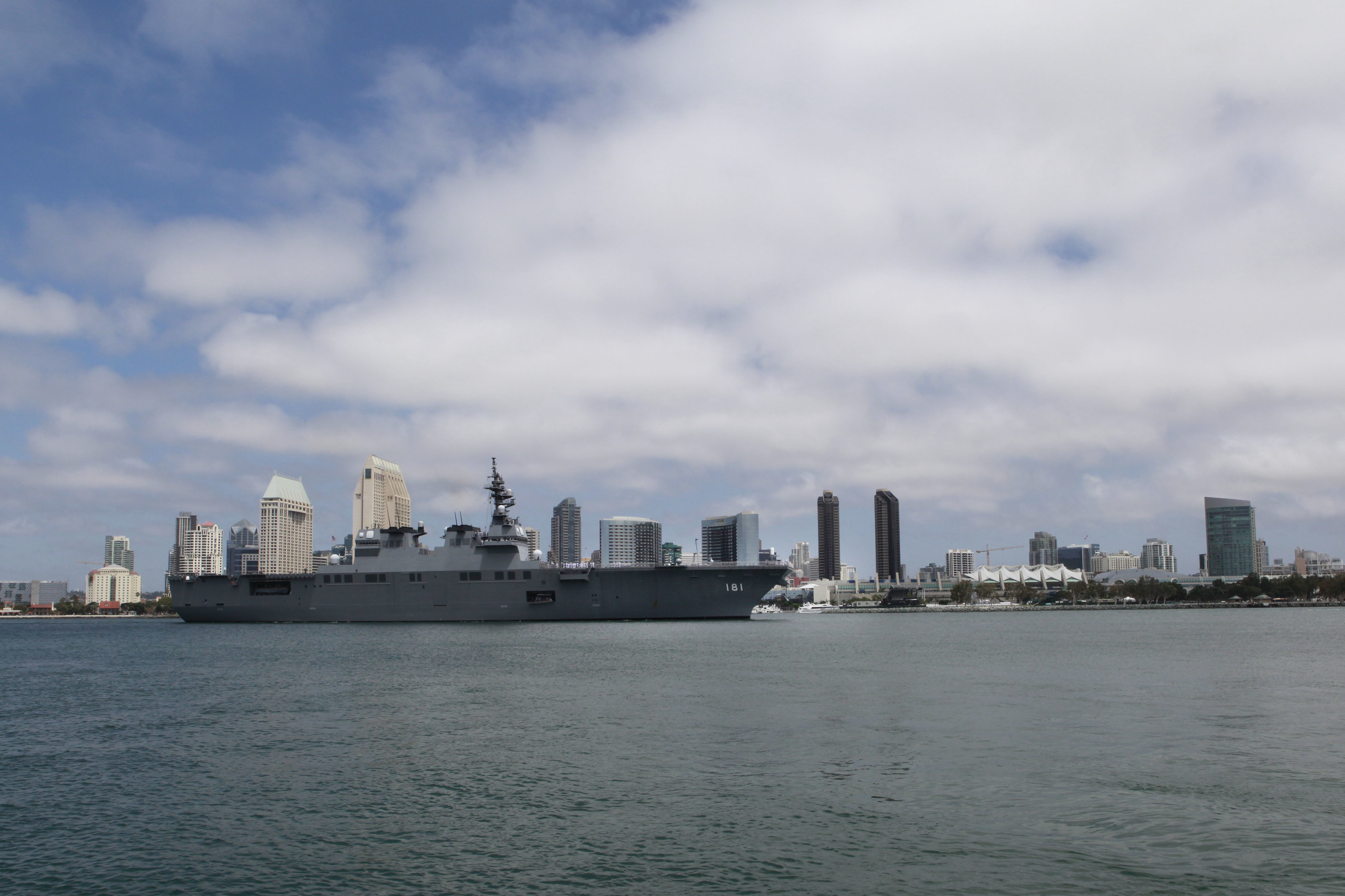
JS Hyūga enters San Diego, 17 August 2015.

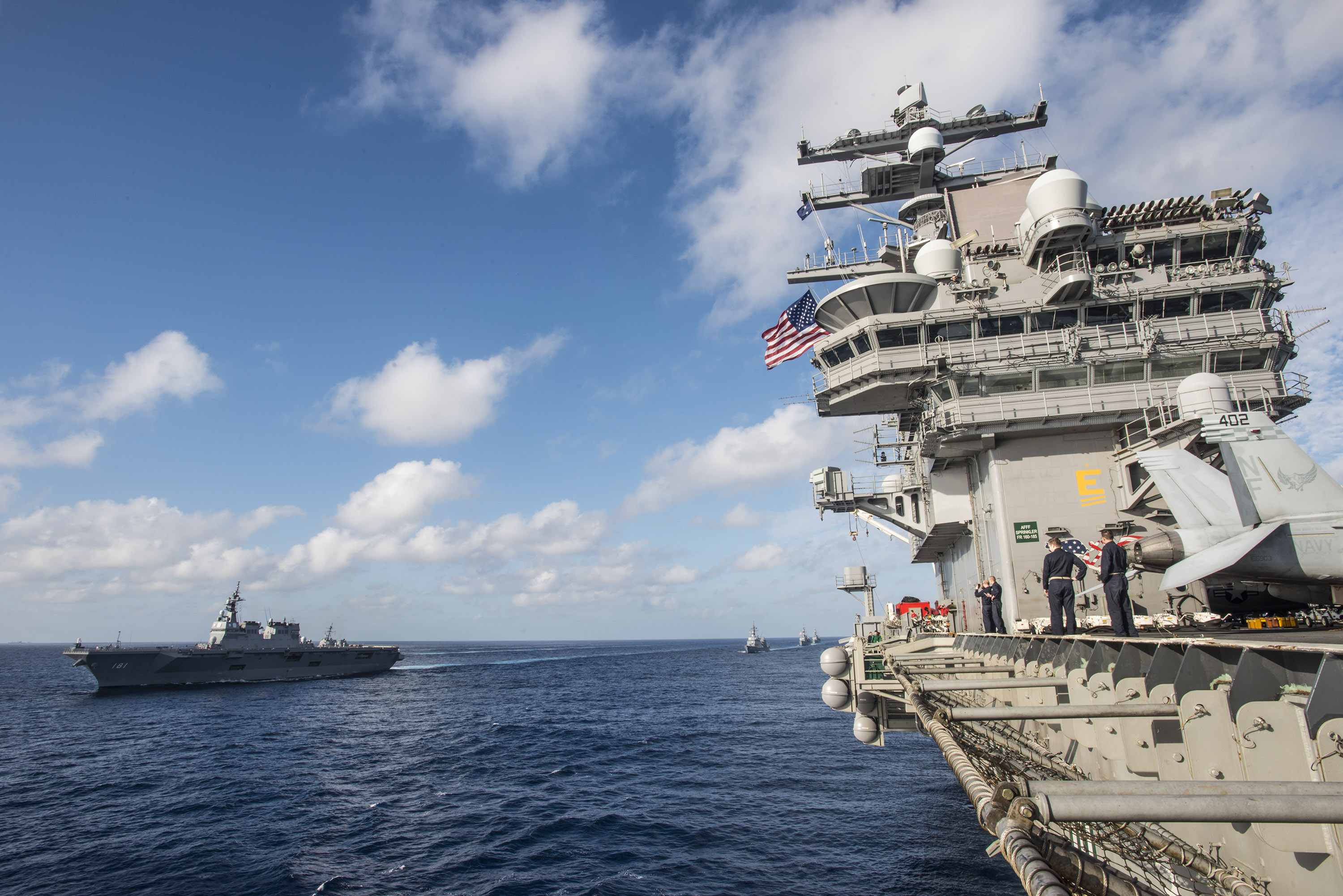
JS Hyūga and USS Ronald Reagan on 23 November 2015.

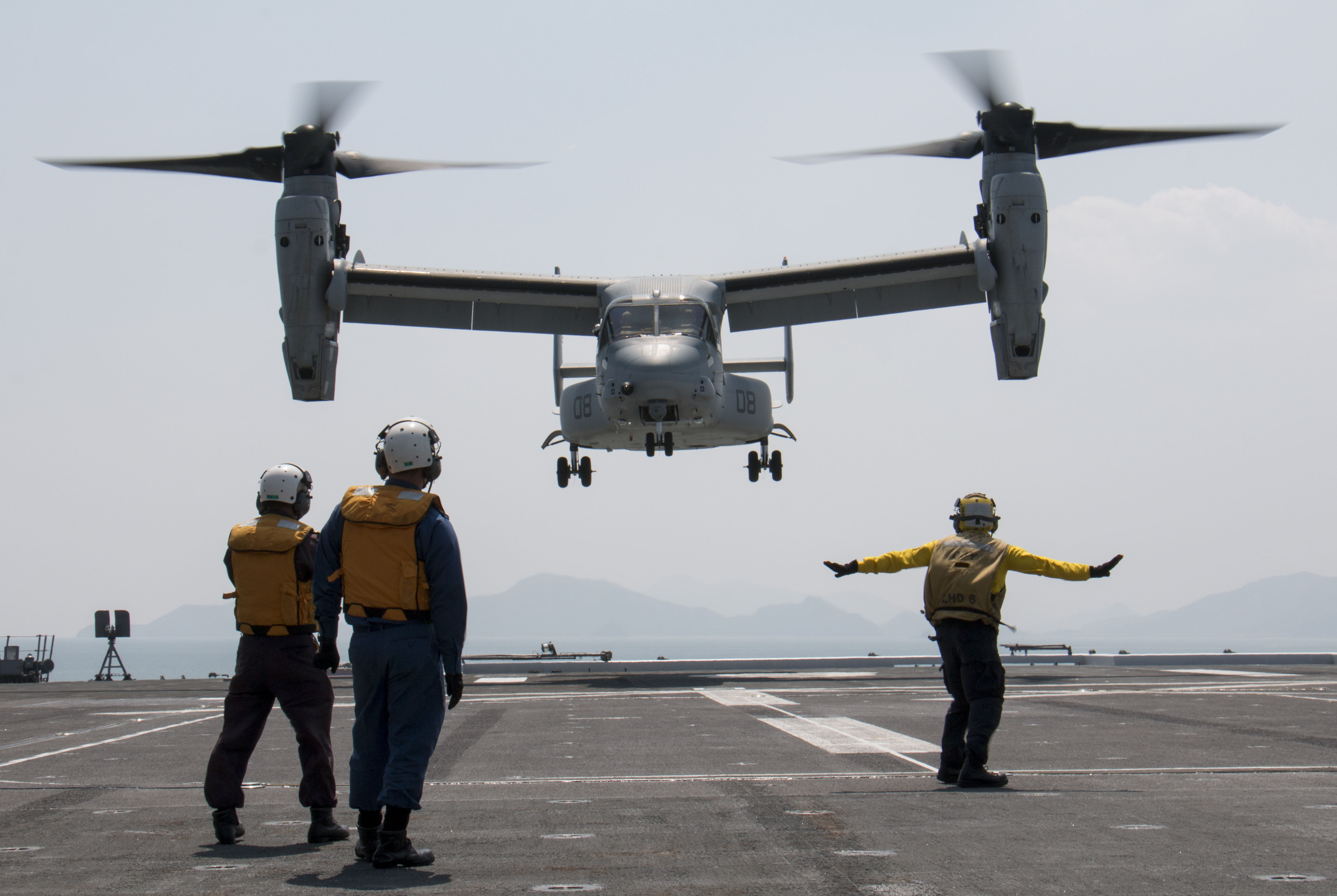
USMC MV-22B Osprey aboard JS Hyūga on 19 April 2016.

JS Hyūga arriving at Pearl Harbor on 3 August 2016.

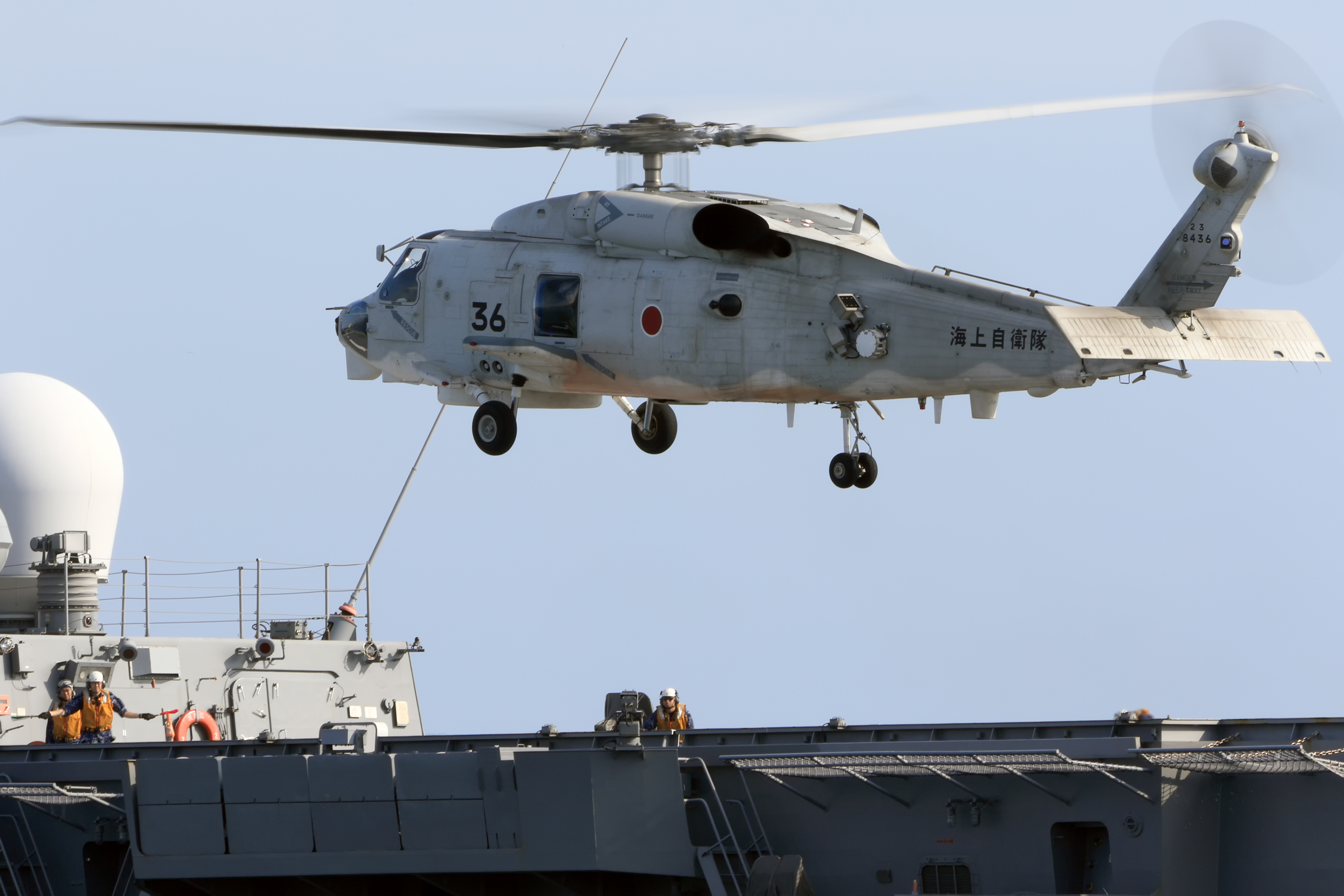
An SH-60K taking off from JS Hyūga on 25 September 2016.

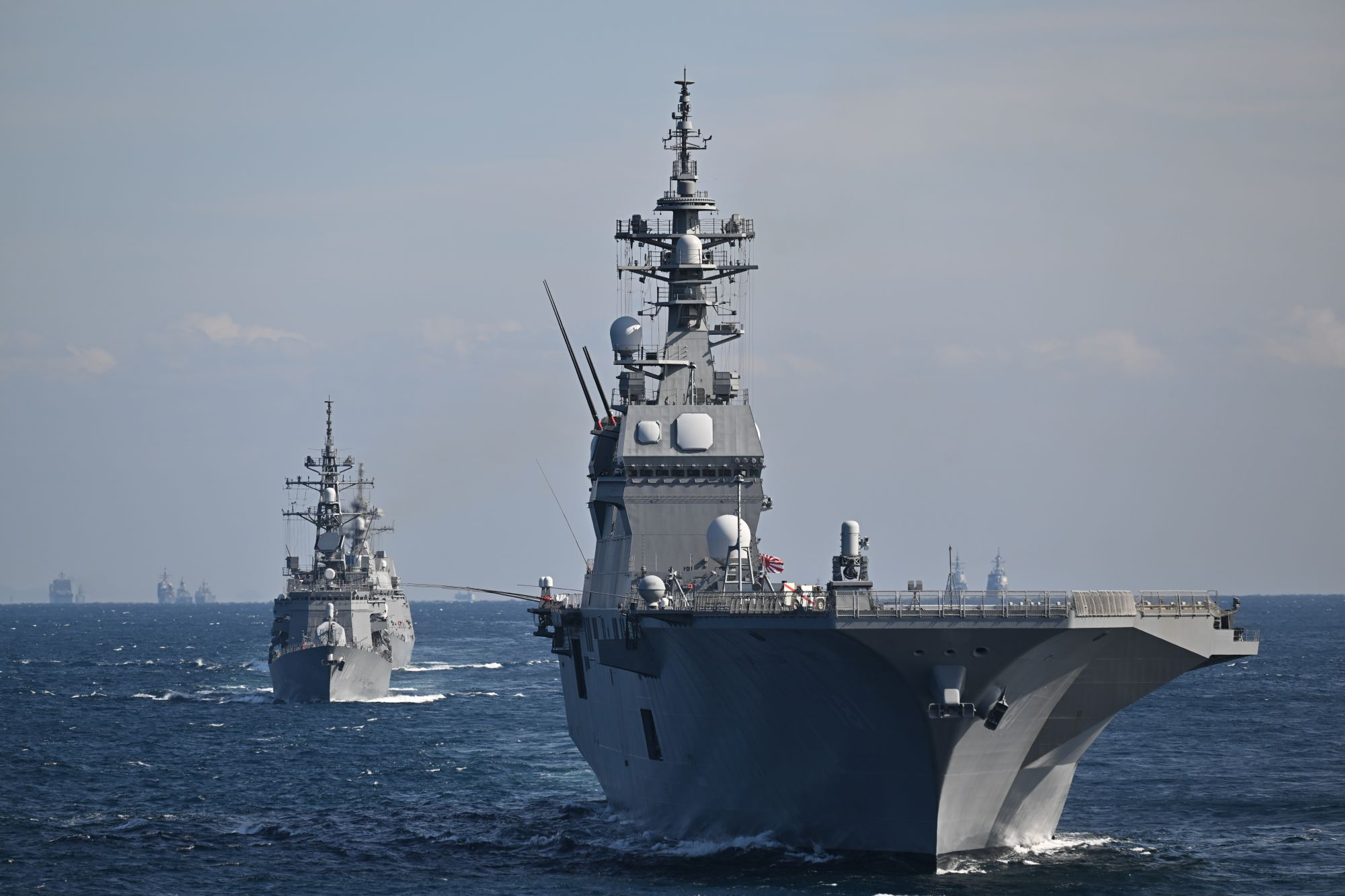
JS Hyūga, accompanied by JS Takanami during International Fleet Review, 6 November 2022

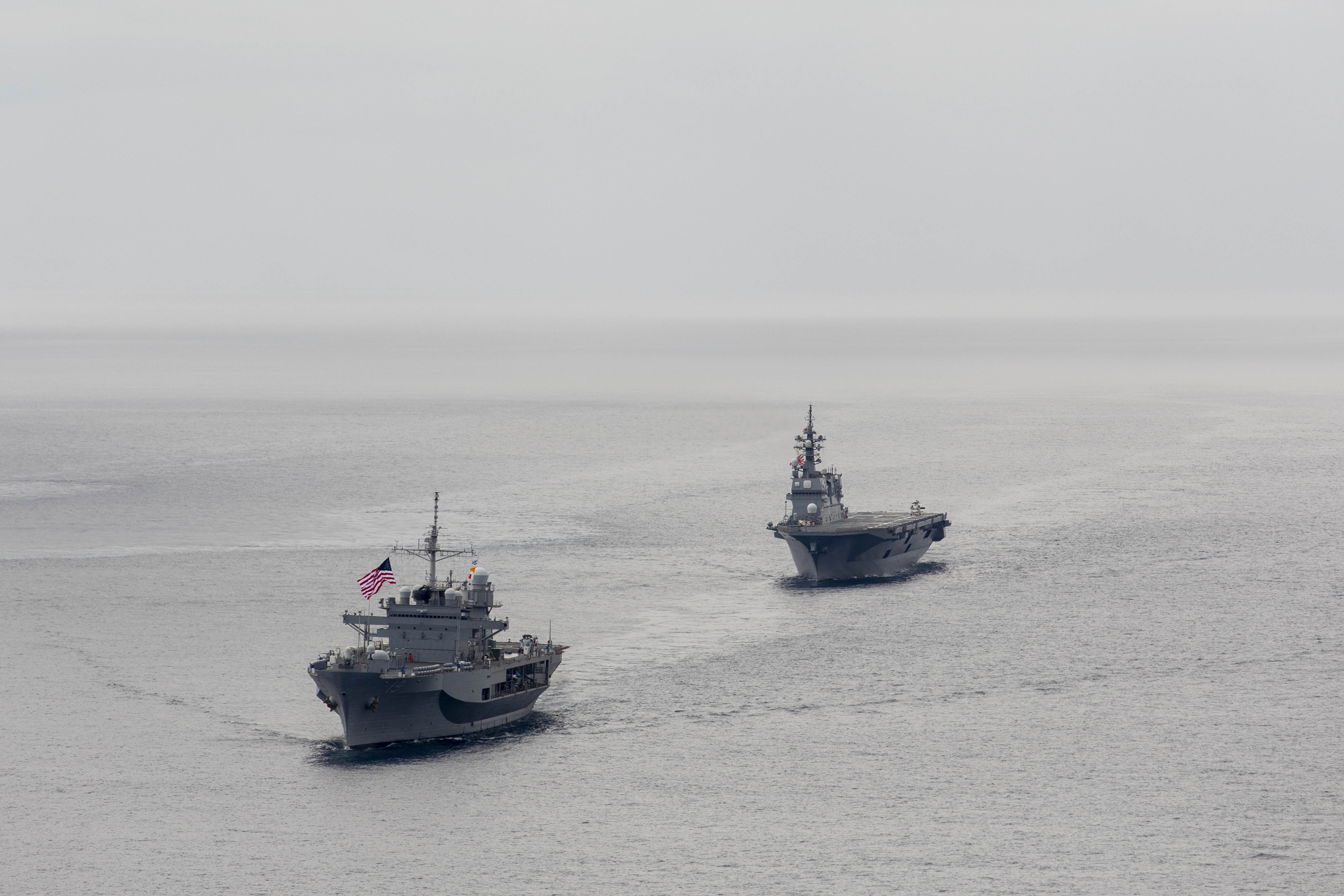
JS Hyūga sails with USS Blue Ridge during Exercise Freedom Edge, 16 September 2025
