= Hyūga-class helicopter destroyer =

Japanese helicopter carrier class

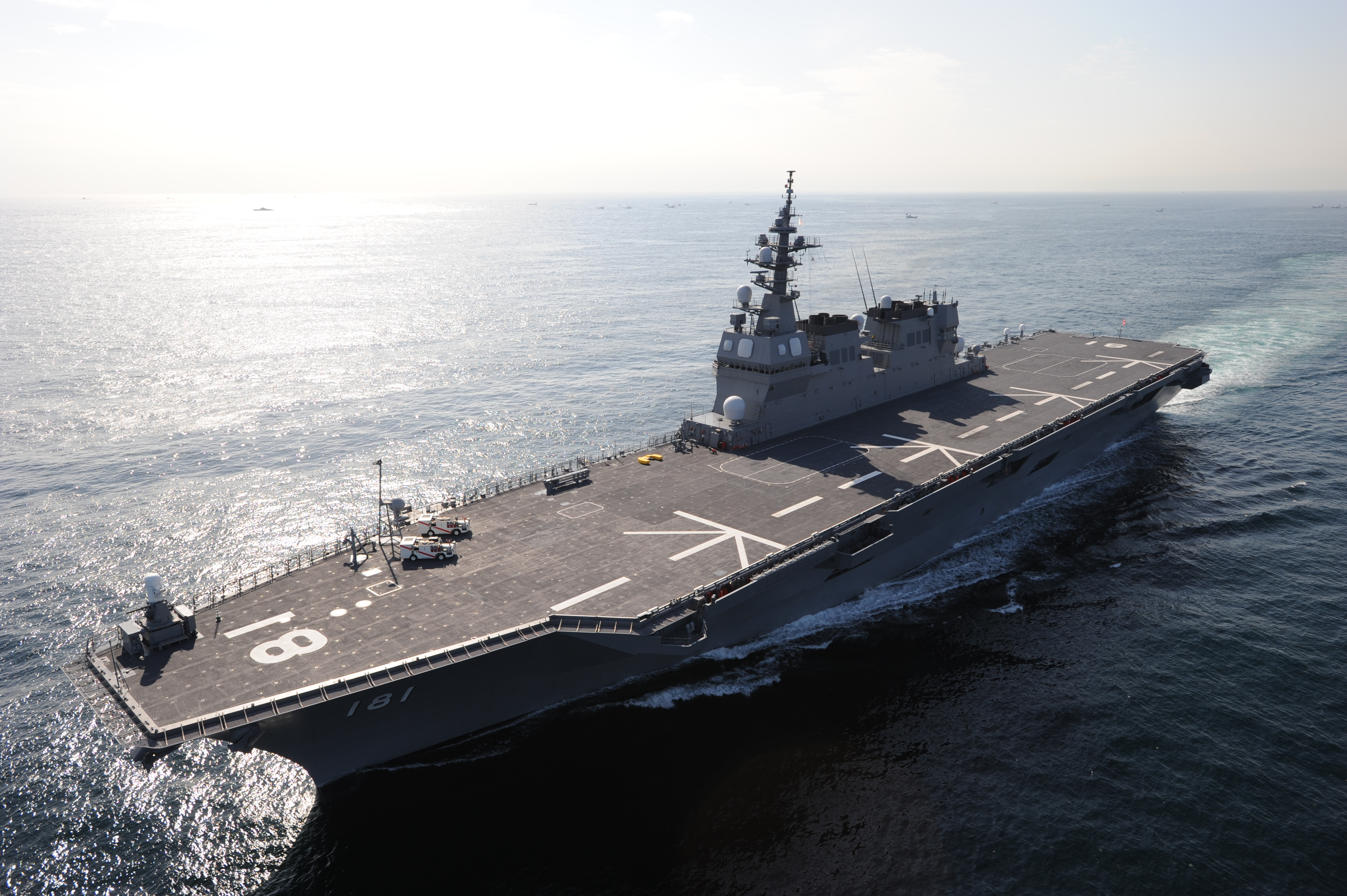
- Hyūga at sea

Class overview
- Name: Hyūga class
- Builders: IHI Marine United
- Operators: Japan Maritime Self-Defense Force
- Preceded by: Shirane class
- Succeeded by: Izumo class
- Built: 2006–2011
- In commission: 2009–present
- Completed: 2
- Active: 2

General characteristics
- Type: ASW carrier
- Displacement: 13,950 tons standard; 19,000 tons full load
- Length: 197 m (646 ft)
- Beam: 33 m (108 ft)
- Draft: 7 m (23 ft)
- Propulsion: COGAG, 4 Ishikawajima Harima/General Electric LM2500-30 gas turbines; Two shafts 5-bladed CP props; 100,000 shaft horsepower (75 MW)
- Speed: Over 30 knots (56 km/h; 35 mph)
- Complement: 360 (Hyūga); 371 (Ise)
- Sensors & processing systems: ATECS (advanced technology command system); OYQ-10 advanced combat direction system; FCS-3 AAW system; OQQ-21 ASW system; NOLQ-3C EW system; OPS-20C surface search radar
- Armament: 16 cells Mk 41 VLS; 16 ESSM; 12 RUM-139 VL ASROC; 2 × 20 mm Phalanx CIWS; 2 × triple 324 mm torpedo tubes; 12.7mm MG
- Aircraft carried: 3 × SH-60K, 1 × MCH-101; 18 aircraft maximum
- Aviation facilities: Flight deck and enclosed hangar

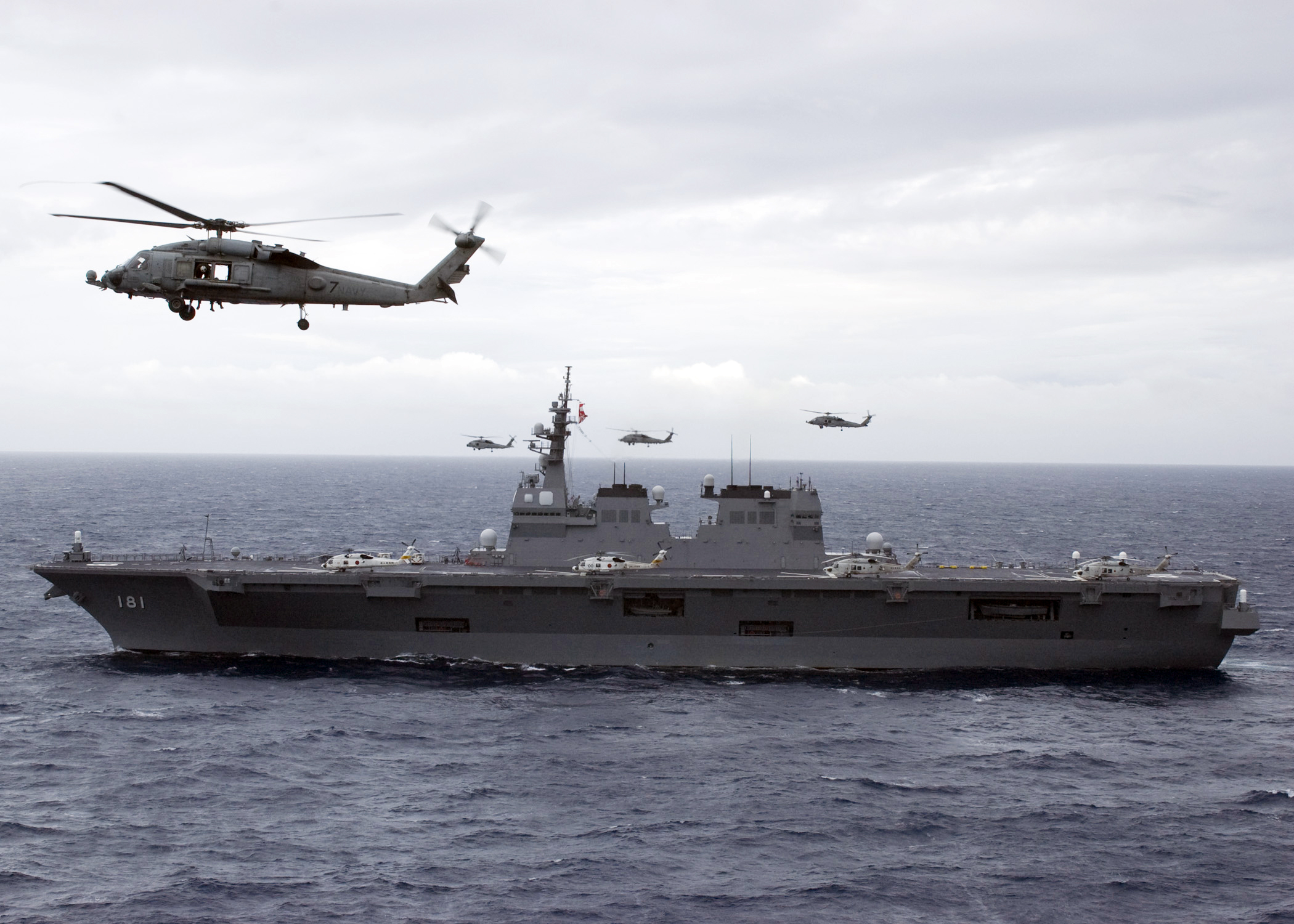
JS Hyūga with helicopters in operation

The Hyūga-class helicopter destroyer (ひゅうが型護衛艦, Hyūga-gata-goei-kan) is a class of helicopter carrier built for the Japan Maritime Self-Defense Force (JMSDF). Two — Hyūga and Ise — were built; upon completion the class were the largest ships built for the Japanese navy since the Second World War. Hyūga was described in a PBS documentary as the "first Japanese aircraft carrier built since WWII".

The Hyūgas were followed by the larger Izumo class, the first being commissioned in March 2015. The Izumos replaced the Shirane-class helicopter destroyers; the Hyūgas were originally meant to replace the Shiranes.

The specifications of the Hyūga class are comparable to light aircraft carriers, such as the Italian Giuseppe Garibaldi and Spanish Príncipe de Asturias. Under the JMSDF's naming conventions, the ships are called goei-kan (護衛艦, lit. "escort ship") in Japanese and destroyer in English, as same as all the other combatant ships of JMSDF.

During development, Hyūga and Ise were provisionally named "16DDH" and "18DDH" respectively. The numbers derived from the Japanese calendar, specifically the 16th year and 18th year of the Heisei reign (2004 and 2006), when the provisional name were given.

== Design and specifications ==
The Hyūgas are primarily anti-submarine warfare carriers operating SH-60K anti-submarine helicopters. They also have enhanced command-and-control capabilities to serve as flagships. During peacetime, Hyūgas and Ōsumi-class ships could operate together to conduct military operations other than war, peacekeeping and relief operations.

The ships are armed with a 16-cell VLS carrying the Evolved Sea Sparrow Missile surface-to-air missile, and Phalanx close in weapon system for self-defense. They are also equipped with the ATECS command system and FCS-3 fire control with active electronically scanned array radar system.

Globalsecurity.org suggests a maximum capacity of 18-24 H-60 class helicopters, or a smaller number of larger helicopters, even though the official complement was reported as three Mitsubishi H-60 and one AgustaWestland AW101 helicopters, or three Mitsubishi H-60 and one Sikorsky CH-53 Sea Stallion helicopters. The ships have also operated JGSDF Fuji AH-64D Apache attack helicopters during joint amphibious exercises with the United States. It is speculated that future modifications may allow the operation of VTOL/STOVL fixed-wing aircraft, such as Harriers or F-35 Lightning II.

In 2013, the USMC operated V-22 Ospreys on Hyūga during joint amphibious exercises.

In 2016, MV-22 Ospreys operated off Hyūga in the participation of relief efforts following the Kumamoto earthquake.

== Ships in the class ==
Construction of the first ship, JS Hyūga, was started in 2006 and it was launched on 23 August 2007. The second was launched and named JS Ise on 21 August 2009.

Name	Pennant no.	Builder	Laid down	Launched	Commissioned	Status
Hyūga	DDH-181	IHI Marine United, Yokohama	11 May 2006	23 August 2007	18 March 2009	Active in service
Ise	DDH-182	IHI Marine United, Yokohama	30 May 2008	21 August 2009	16 March 2011	Active in service

Hyūga was named after Hyūga Province (日向国, Hyūga no kuni) (present-day Miyazaki Prefecture) on the east coast of Kyūshū, and Ise after Ise Province (伊勢国, Ise no kuni) (present-day Mie Prefecture). They inherited the names of the Ise-class battleships Hyūga and Ise of the Imperial Japanese Navy. These two ships had been built during World War I and served in World War II. Following the Battle of Midway, Hyūga and Ise were converted into a hybrid battleship/aircraft carriers in 1943 with the replacement of the aft gun turrets and barbettes by a small aircraft handling deck and hangar deck with which they could launch a squadron of Yokosuka D4Y dive-bombers and Aichi E16A seaplanes.

In November 2009, Hyūga participated in "Annualex 21G" joint naval exercise with the US aircraft carrier USS George Washington and other USN and JMSDF ships to maintain the interoperability between the two navies.

On 11 March 2011, the 2011 Tōhoku earthquake and tsunami struck the northeast part of Japan. Hyūga immediately moved to off the coast of Miyagi prefecture and started search and rescue operations. Ise, which went into service on 16 March, also will join aid delivery operation for refuge shelters.

On 8 November 2013, Super-Typhoon Haiyan crossed the Visayas, Philippines. Ise joined the relief operation, using its helicopters to provide relief supplies to remote areas cut off by the storm.

== Gallery ==
Hyūga-class

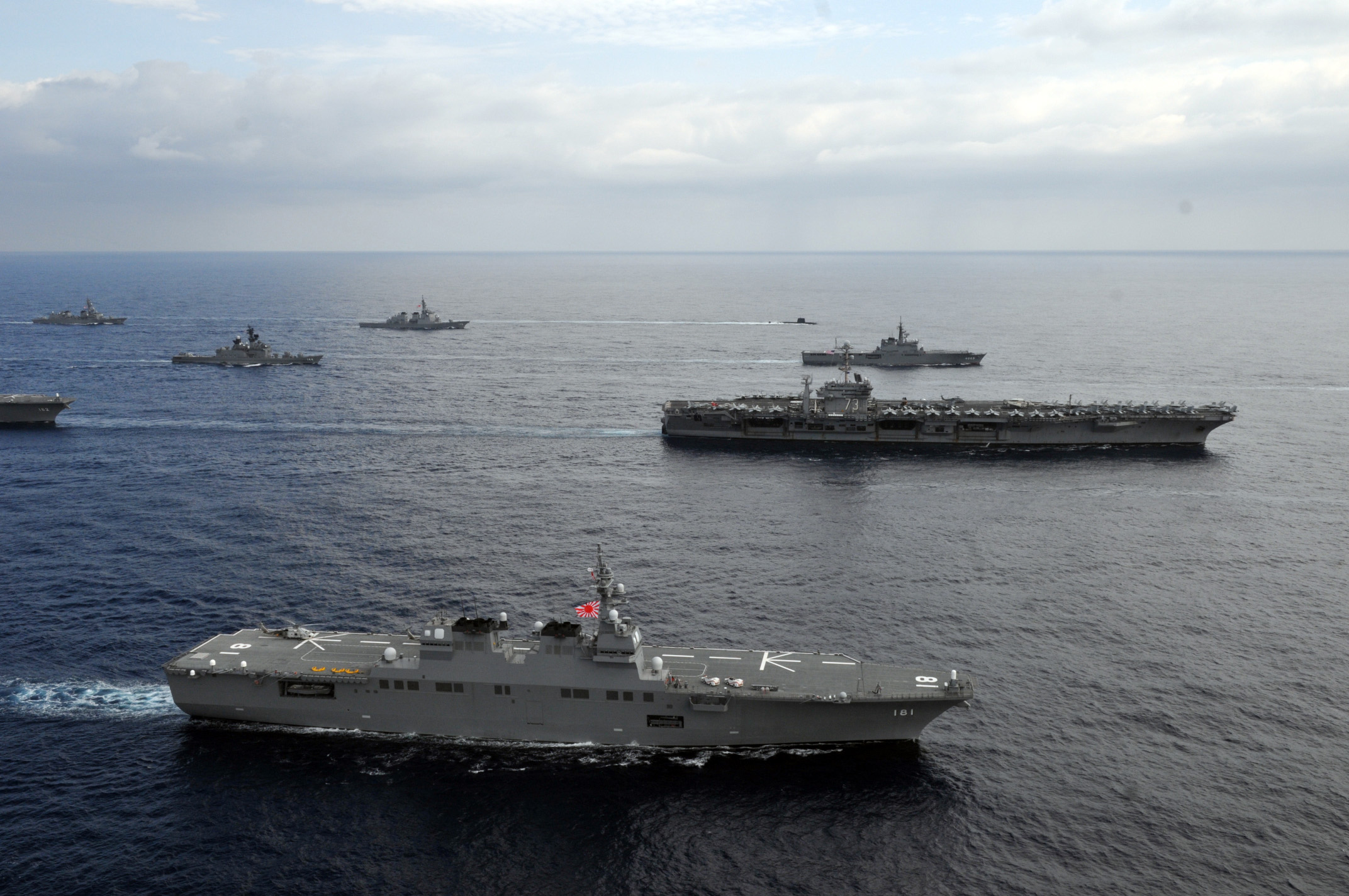
USS George Washington and JS Hyūga

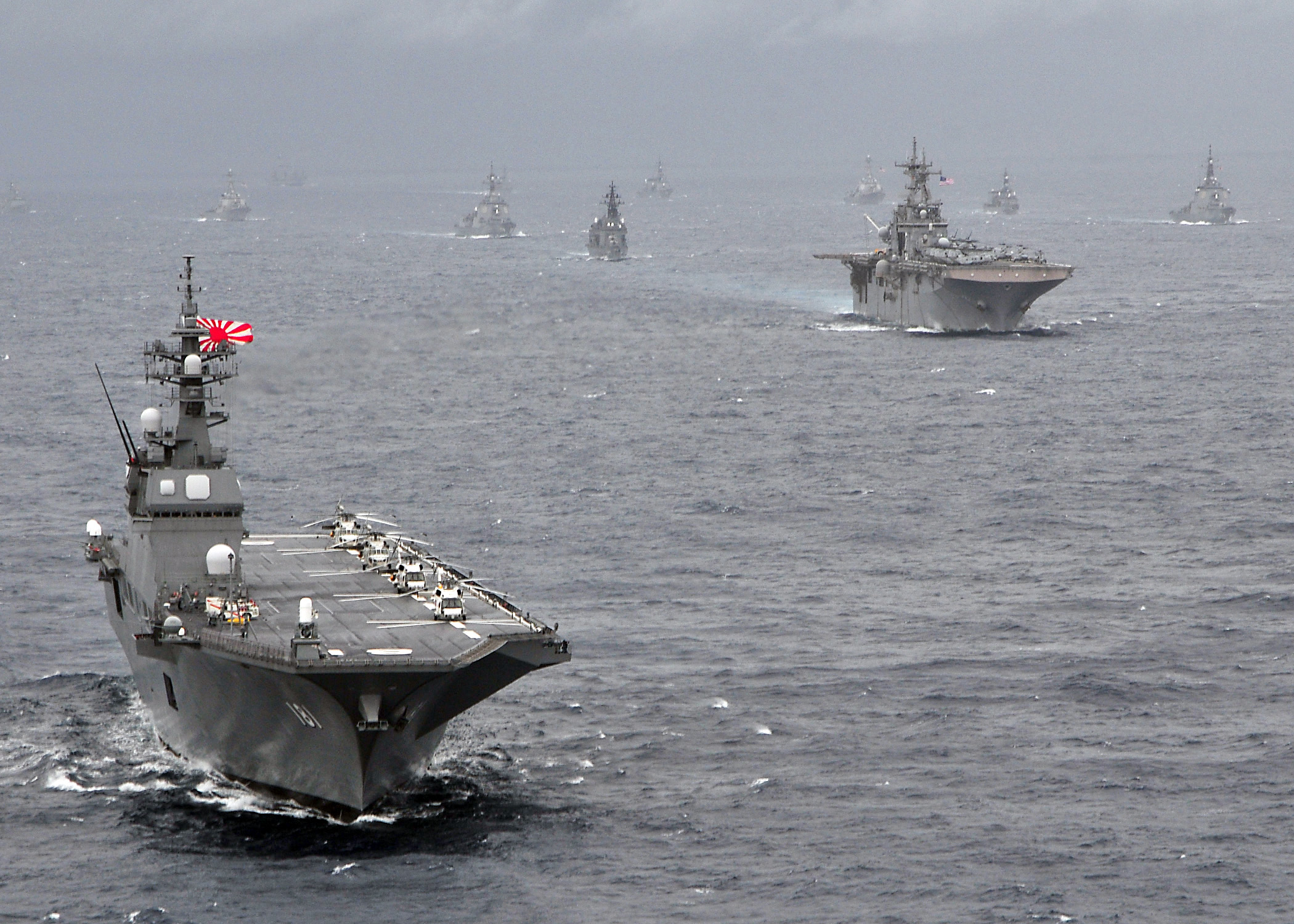
On exercise with a US Navy Wasp-class amphibious assault ship

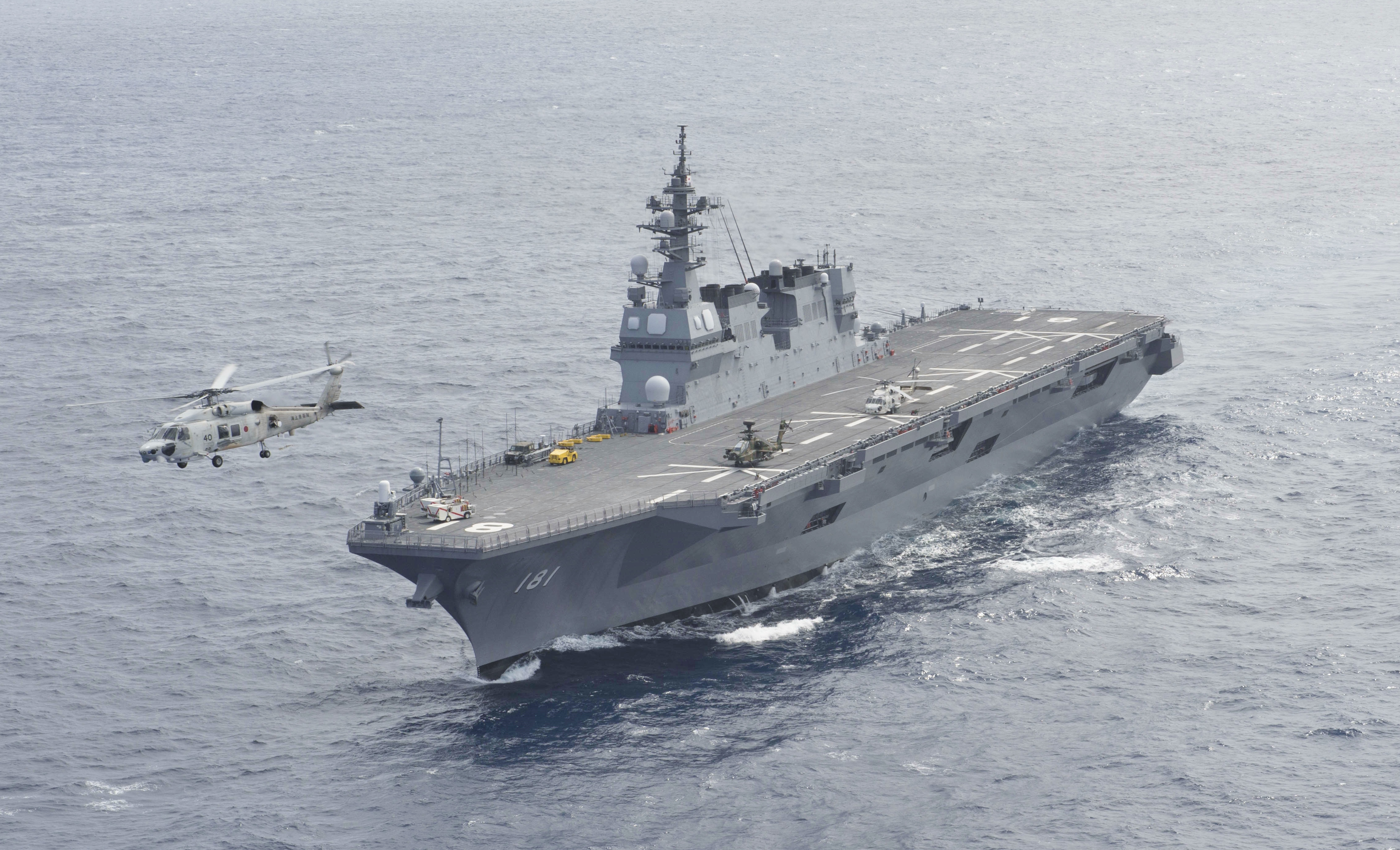
JS Hyūga operating AH-64D and SH-60K helicopters

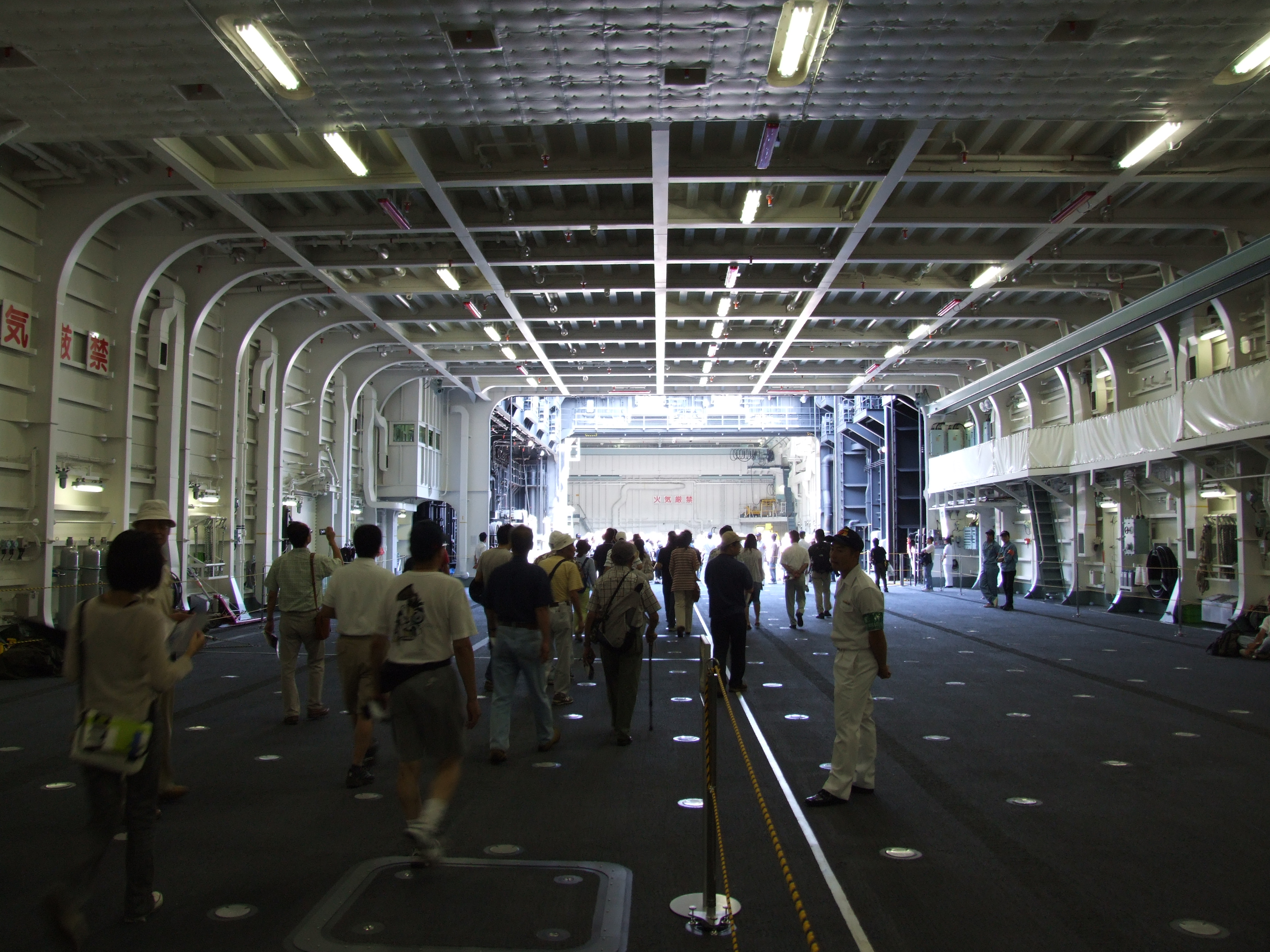
Hyūga aircraft hangar

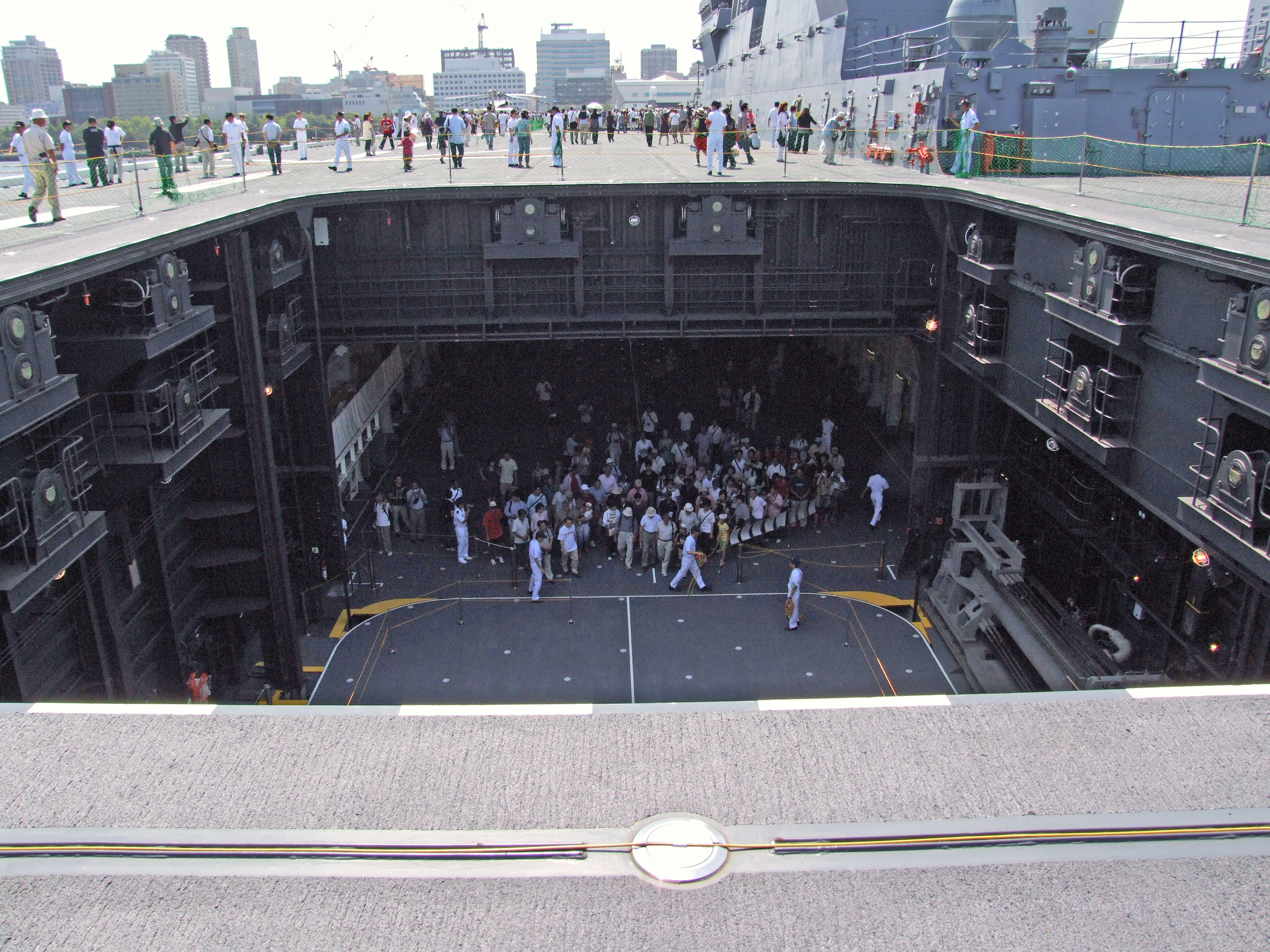
Aircraft elevator

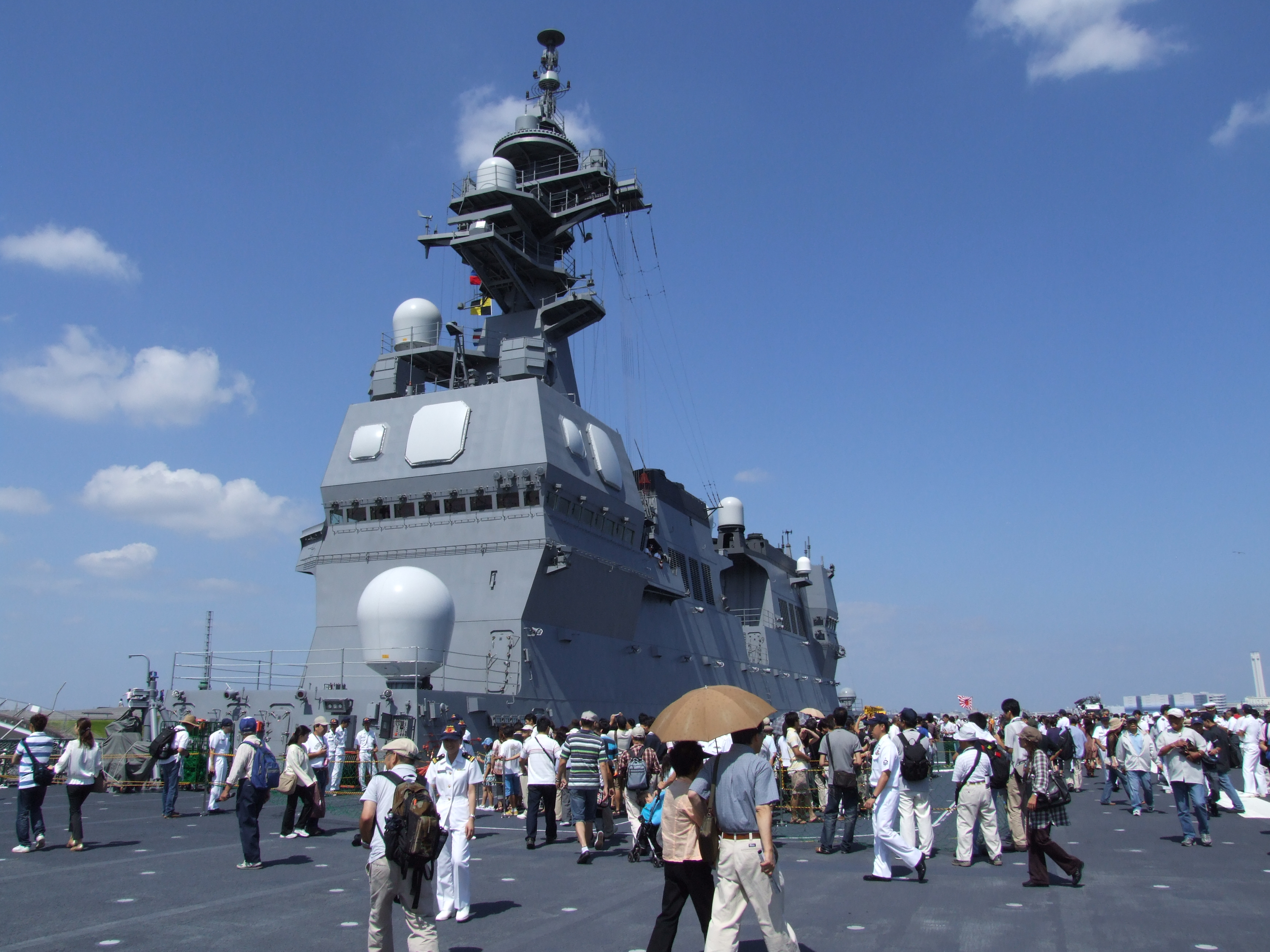
Flight deck

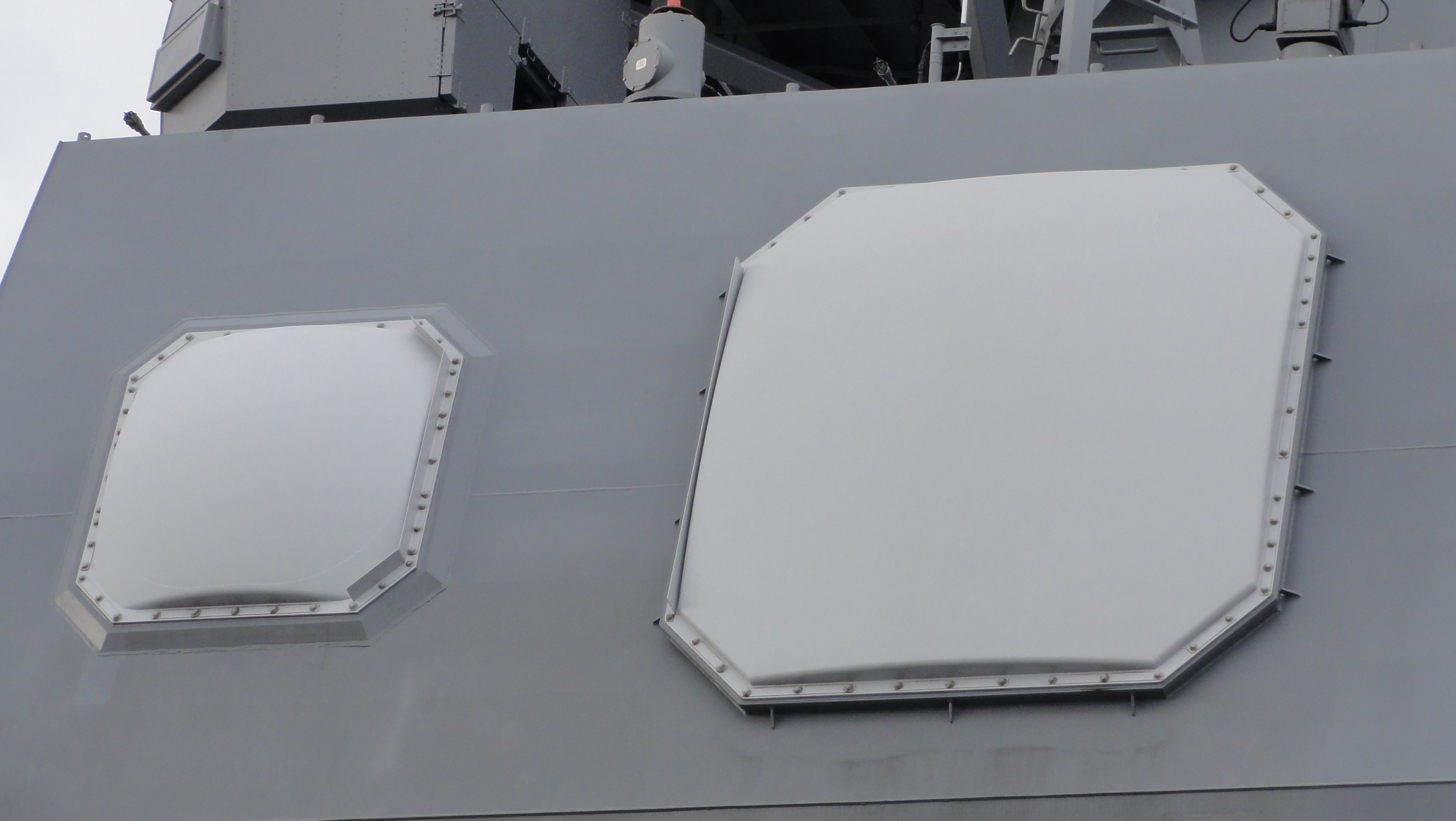
FCS-3

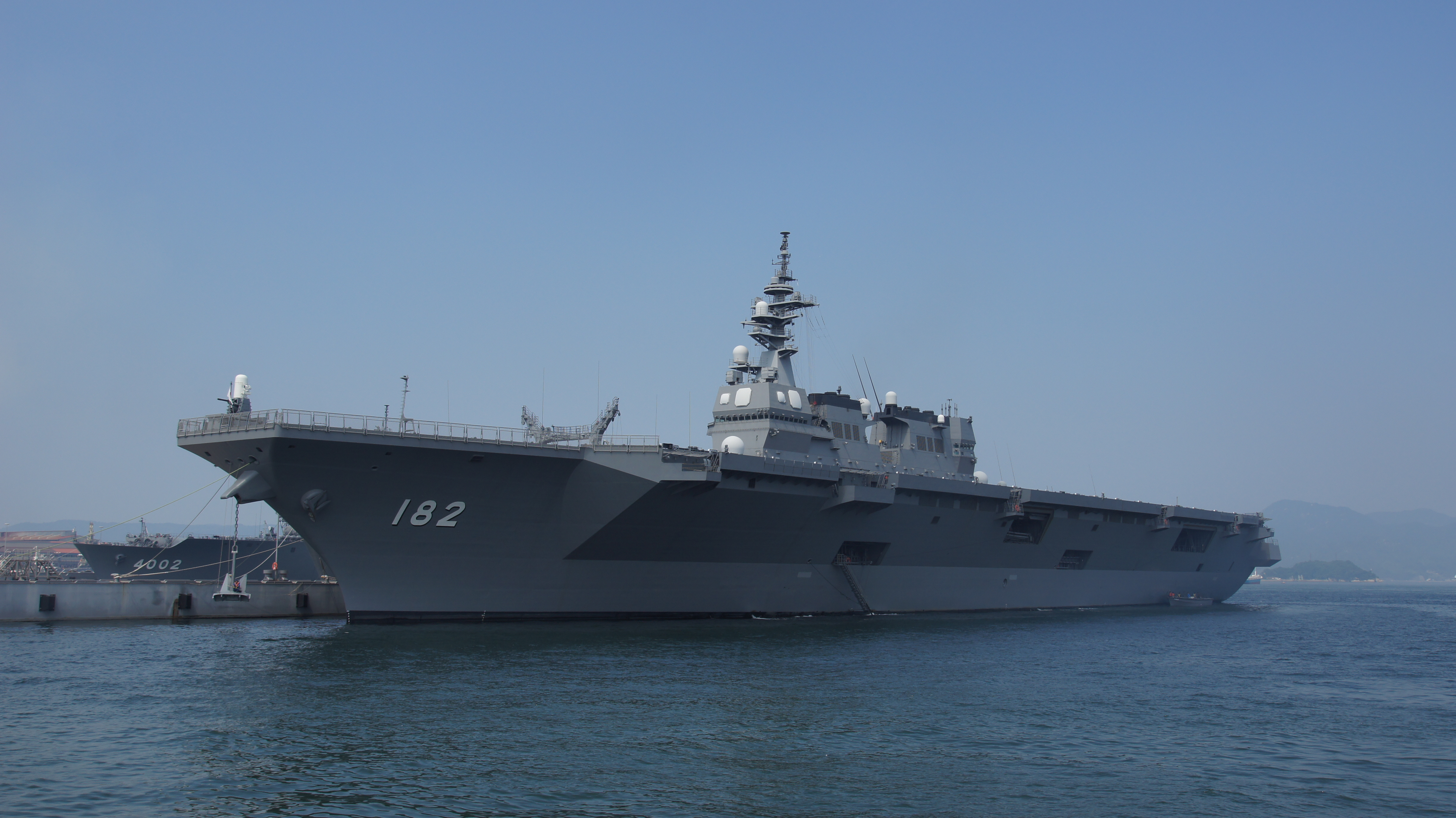
Ise in Kure

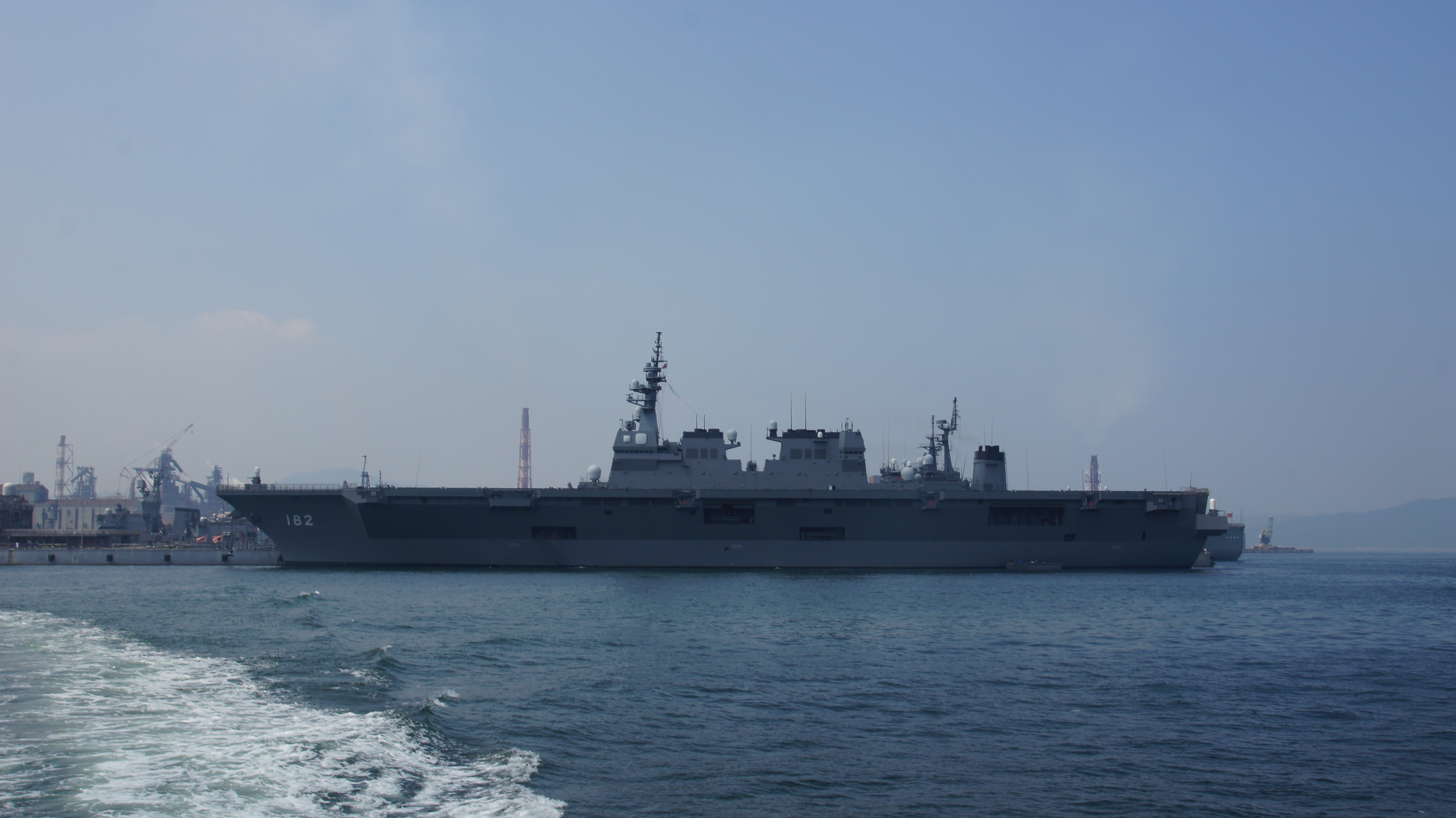
Ise port side view

U.S. Marine Corps MV-22B Osprey
