= C. V. S. Rao =

Indian Police Officer

C.V.S. Rao
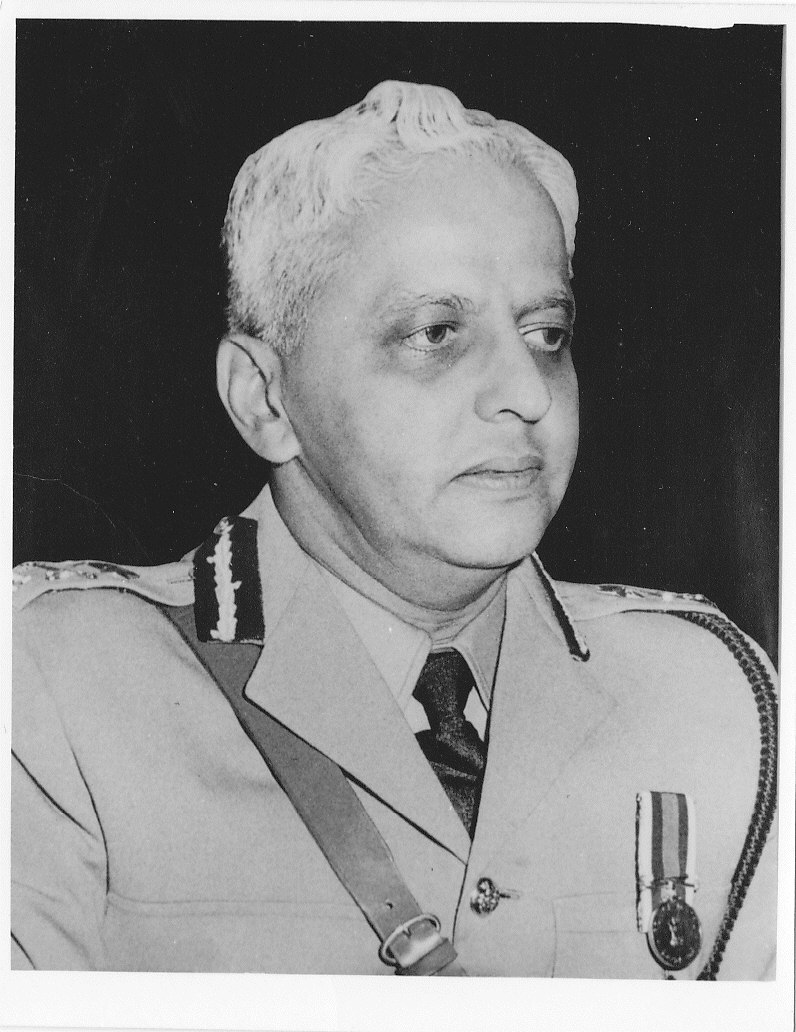
- CVS Rao IGP Karnataka 1972–76
- Born: 9 October 1918; Mysore, Karnataka
- Died: 8 October 1993 (aged 74); Bangalore
- Police career
- Country: India
- Department: Indian Police Service
- Service years: 24
- Rank: Inspector General of Police
- Awards: President's Police Medal for Distinguished Service, Police Medal for Meritorious Service

C.V.S. Rao IPS (9 October 1918 – 8 October 1993) was a senior police officer in the Indian Police Service. Chitradurga Vasudeva Sreenivasa Rao was born in Mysore, India. His notable accomplishments in his 24 years of service included the computerisation of criminal records at a time when computer technology was in its infant stages, the design and implementation of the Police Memorial and the observance of Police Commemoration Day in the state on 21 October, setting up of the Police Benevolent Fund and the first Accident Relief Unit (ambulance vans and police officers trained in first-aid) in Bangalore.

Before CVS Rao took office, the uniforms worn by police constables were outdated and cumbersome, making them less responsive and unattractive. Rao implemented new, better looking and better fitting uniforms and higher uniform allowances for both men and women of the Karnataka Police.

CVS set up the Corps of Detectives in 1974 to ensure serious crimes received the focus they needed. Homicide, vice, fraud and other squads were set up to significantly reduce crimes such as the abduction of girls, maiming of children, homicides and white-collar crimes. He also set up the Civil Rights Enforcement Cell to help eradicate harassment and atrocities against certain minorities.

== Early life ==
CVS started school at Government Middle School in Mysore and completed his high school at King George English School in Bombay (Mumbai). He received his bachelor's degree from Elphinston College and his Bachelor of Commerce from Sydenhane College, both in Bombay (Mumbai).

He started his career at Hindustan Aeronautics Limited in Bangalore.

== Police career ==
In 1952, CVS Rao joined the Indian Police Service under the Emergency Recruitment Scheme and started his police training at the Central Police Training (CPT) College in Mount Abu. He received his practical training at North Arcot District in Chennai and at Madira Circle of Khammampet District in Hyderabad.

His first position was Assistant Superintendent of Police for the Mahaboob Sub-Division in Khammampet District in Hyderabad. A year later CVS was appointed as [Superintendent of Police] in Raichur and two months later moved to Hyderabad as Assistant Inspector General of Police.

After two years, CVS was promoted to the position of Superintendent of Police in charge of the Anti-Corruption department in Bangalore. During his tenure in Bangalore he was also in charge of revising the Karnataka Police Manual. During this time, the new Mysore State was formed and Rao played a large role in several re-organisation schemes including the drafting of the common Police Act, the common Police Manual and other measures to bring about uniformity in Police administration of the New State.

In 1965, CVS Rao was deputised to the Government of India starting as Superintendent of Police at Gulbarga and then to New Delhi as Deputy Inspector General of Police in the Indo-Tibetan Border Police. After New Delhi, he was posted in Ranikhet for a number of years.

In 1972, CVS returned to Bangalore as Inspector General of Police of Karnataka, the highest position in the state's police department.

=== Accomplishments as IGP ===
CVS Rao was Inspector General of Police of Karnataka between 1972 and 1976. In these four years, he accomplished a great deal for the Karnataka State Police as detailed in the 37 pages of the Karnataka State Police Growth in a Century book.

In addition to the accomplishments noted in the introduction above, he was responsible for the following:

- Installation of the first Police Printing Press in Karnataka which was used to print and circulate all Laws, Bulletins, Circulars, Guidelines and Standing Orders of the Police department since 1975
- Expansion and strengthening of the Women police force
- Setup of the first State Industrial Security Force to help secure the large industrial complexes in the state
- Development of a fully staffed Police Research Center
- Grant of a uniform allowance to officers and men below the rank of Police Inspectors
- Revision of Uniforms of Head Constables and Police Constables and a 33% increase in free uniforms
- Organized and hosted the XI All India Police Science Congress
- For the first time, paychecks were computerised in 1974 under Rao's leadership

During the building and operation (it was launched from Russia) of the first Indian Scientific Satellite, Aryabhata, the Police played a key role which was recognised by the Director of the Satellite project in a letter to C.V.S. Rao. "Our efforts could not have come true, but for the unstinted support and cooperation that we have received from you"

== Personal life ==
He married Ahalya Seetharamachar, the daughter of a well known attorney in Bangalore. CVS was the oldest of six children and Ahalya was the second youngest of eight children. They had three children, six grandchildren and many close nephews and nieces. They both loved Carnatic music and playing Gin rummy with their friends and relatives. CVS died in October 1993 from colon cancer. After his passing, Ahalya learned computer skills and working with University Women's Association, helped set up a computer lab and training center for impoverished women. Ahalya joined CVS in heaven on 11 November 2020, after suffering from a heart attack.

CVS and Ahalya were like a Banyan tree with roots that spread around the world and gave solace and shelter to many.
