= Anti-submarine warfare carrier =

Type of small aircraft carrier

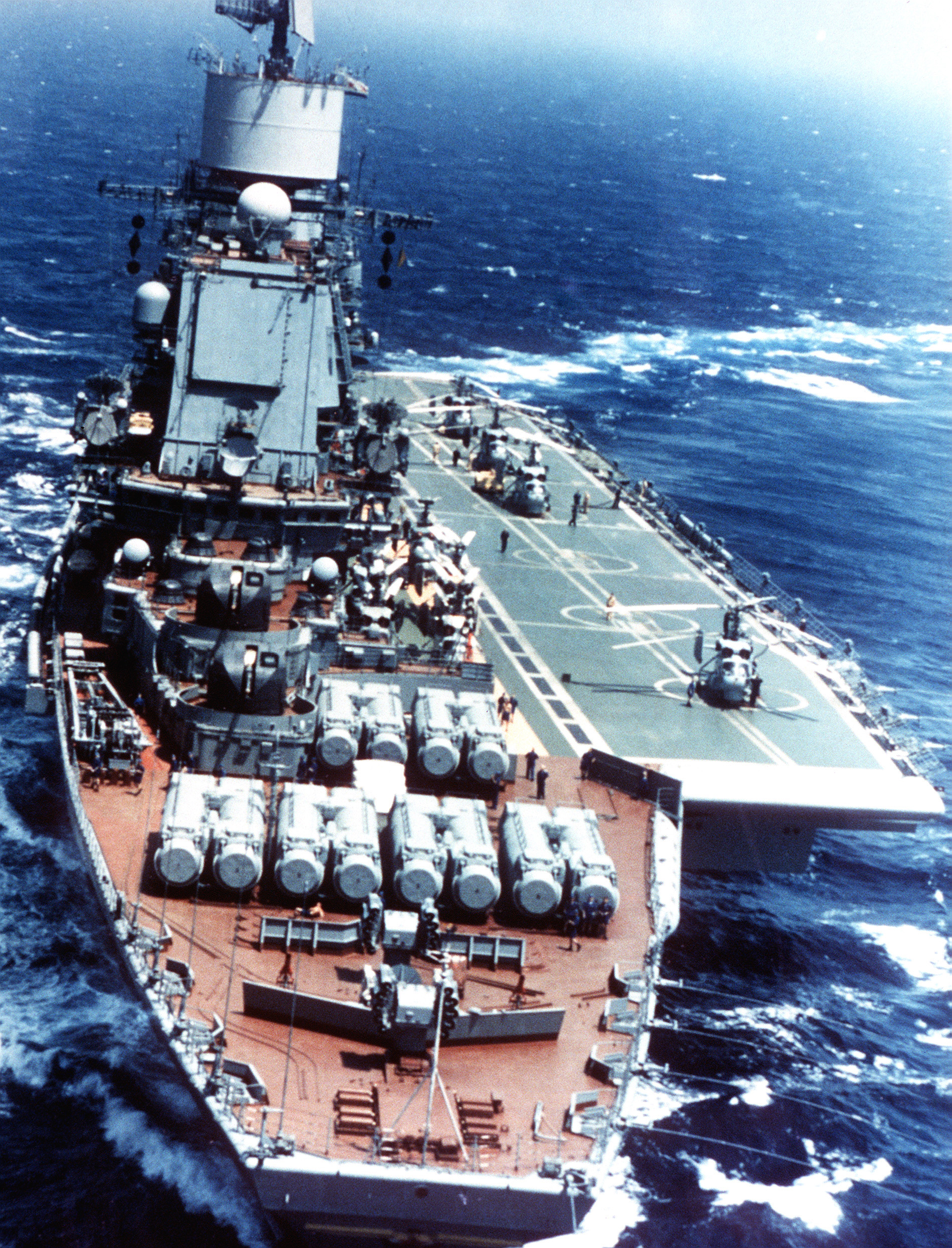
Soviet Navy ASW carrier Baku

An anti-submarine warfare carrier (ASW carrier) (US hull classification symbol CVS) is a type of small aircraft carrier whose primary role is as the nucleus of an anti-submarine warfare hunter-killer group. This type of ship came into existence during the Cold War as a development of the escort carriers used in the ASW role in the North Atlantic during World War II.

== Role ==
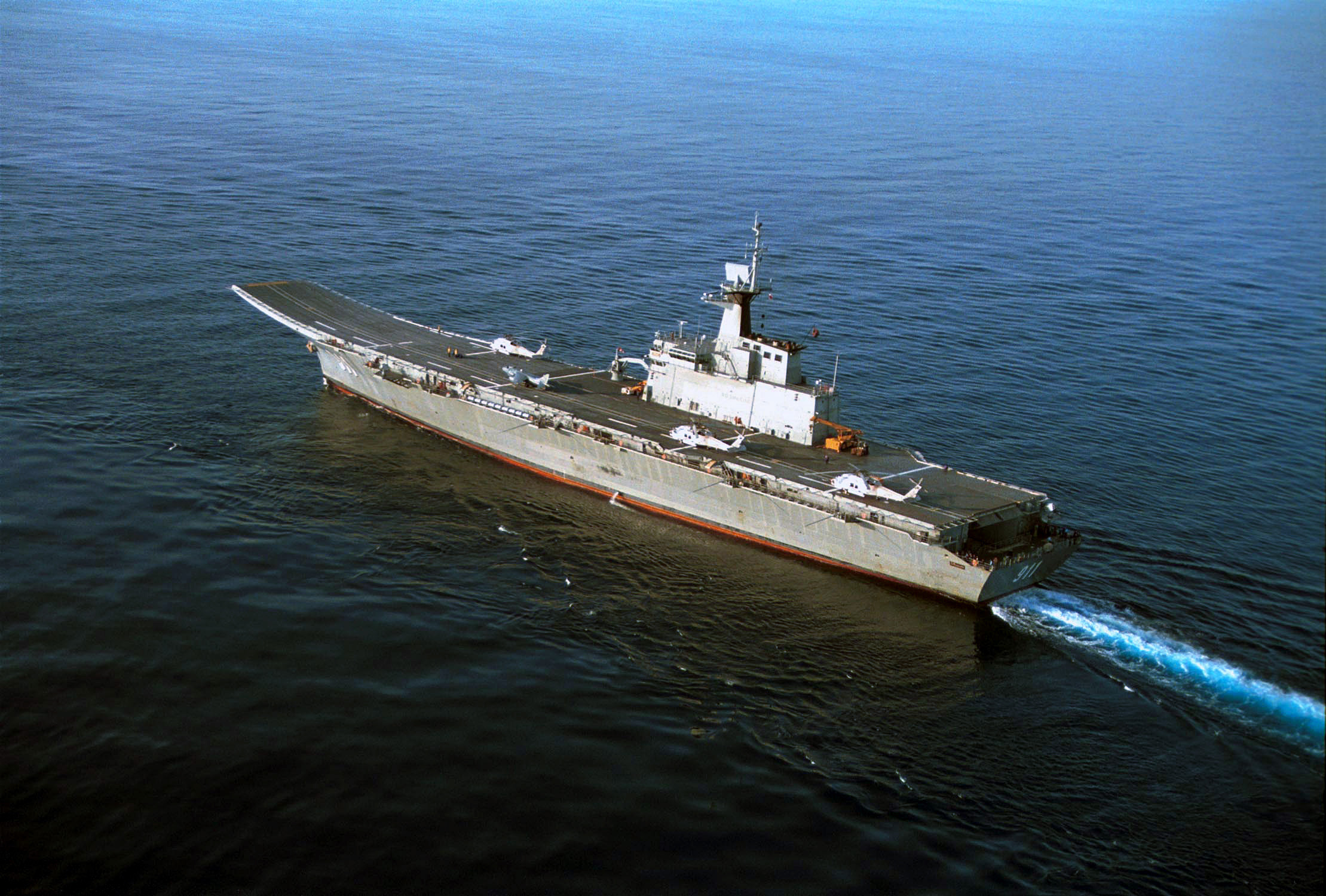
The Royal Thai Navy's HTMS Chakri Naruebet

After World War II, the main naval threat to most Western nations was confrontation with the Soviet Union. The Soviets ended the war with a small navy and took the route of asymmetric confrontation against Western surface ship superiority by investing heavily in submarines both for attack and later fielding submarine-launched missiles. Several nations who purchased British and US surplus light carriers were most easily able to accommodate slow-moving, less expensive, and easy-to-land anti-submarine aircraft from the 1960s forward, such as the S-2 Tracker, which flew from the decks of US, Canadian, Australian, Dutch, Argentine, and Brazilian carriers, or Alizé, which flew from French and Indian ships, allowing these ships to still remain useful especially in the framework of NATO even as newer fighter and strike aircraft were becoming too heavy for the equipment designed for World War II aircraft.

Improvement in long-range shore-based patrol and conventional ship-based ASW helicopter capability combined with the increasing difficulty maintaining surplus WWII carriers led to most of these ships being retired or docked by smaller nations from the 1970s to the mid-1980s. This trend in ASW force draw-down only accelerated with the massive reduction in the operational Soviet/Russian submarine fleet, which rarely went to sea in large numbers in the 1990s. Ships that could be called dedicated ASW carriers are now only found within the Japan MSDF, which operates helicopters and no fixed-wing carrier-based aircraft of any kind. Even the United States Navy, the last nation to regularly operate a dedicated fixed-wing carrier-based ASW aircraft, the S-3 Viking, on its mixed-role super carriers had already removed most ASW equipment in the 1990s from this aircraft and has now removed this type from service as of January 2009 without replacement. The Argentine Navy, currently without much hope of a replacement CATOBAR carrier of its own, trained several times a year landings and takeoffs of their S-2 Turbo Trackers aboard the São Paulo until this carrier was also retired.

Much easier to operate from small decks than fixed-wing aircraft were ASW helicopters, which flew from the decks of nearly all allied conventional carriers to this day and most landing platform helicopter or STOVL carriers operated by the Soviet, Spanish, Italian, Japanese, British, and Thai navies.

== List of ASW carriers ==
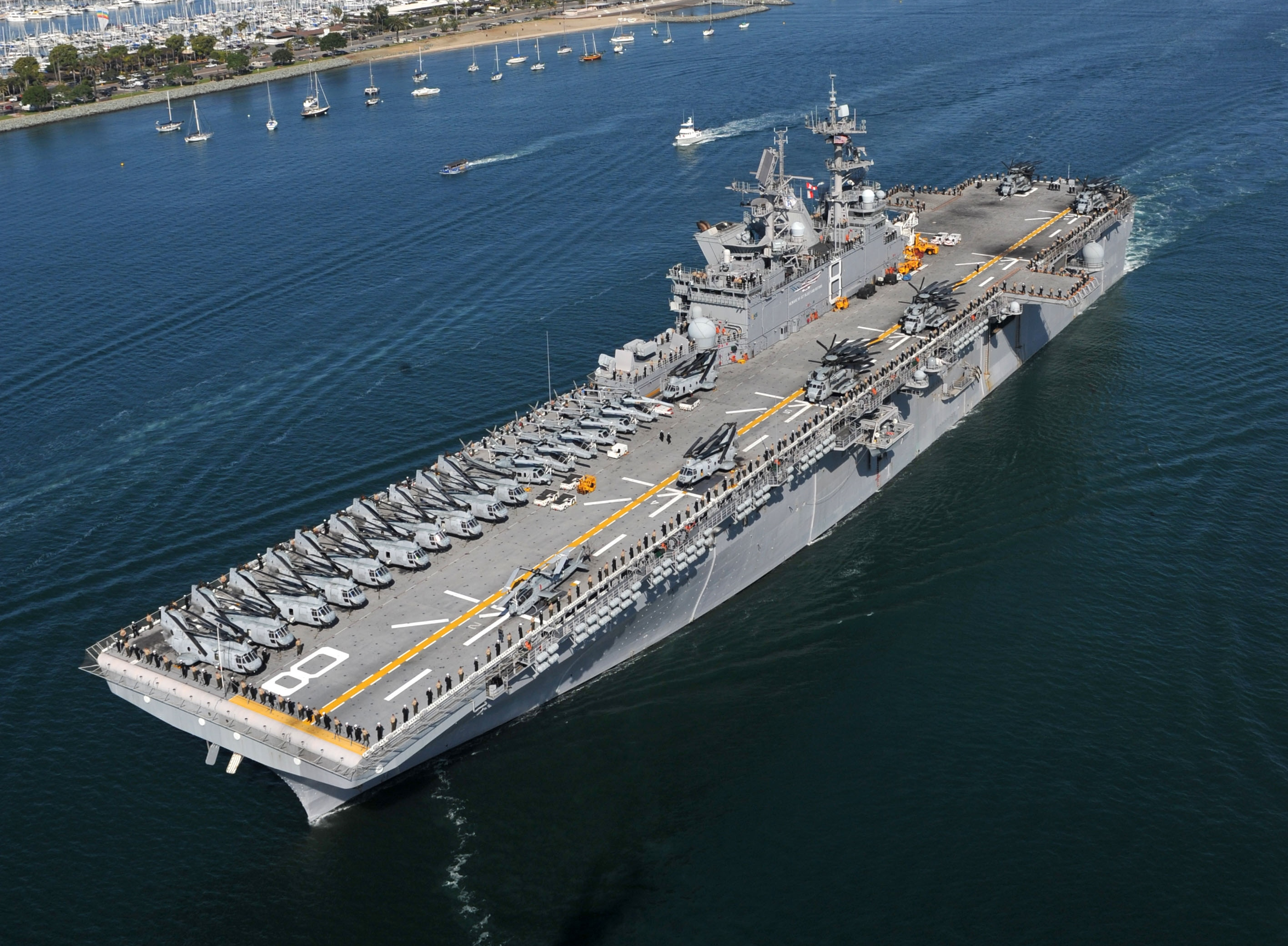
US Navy amphibious assault ship USS Makin Island

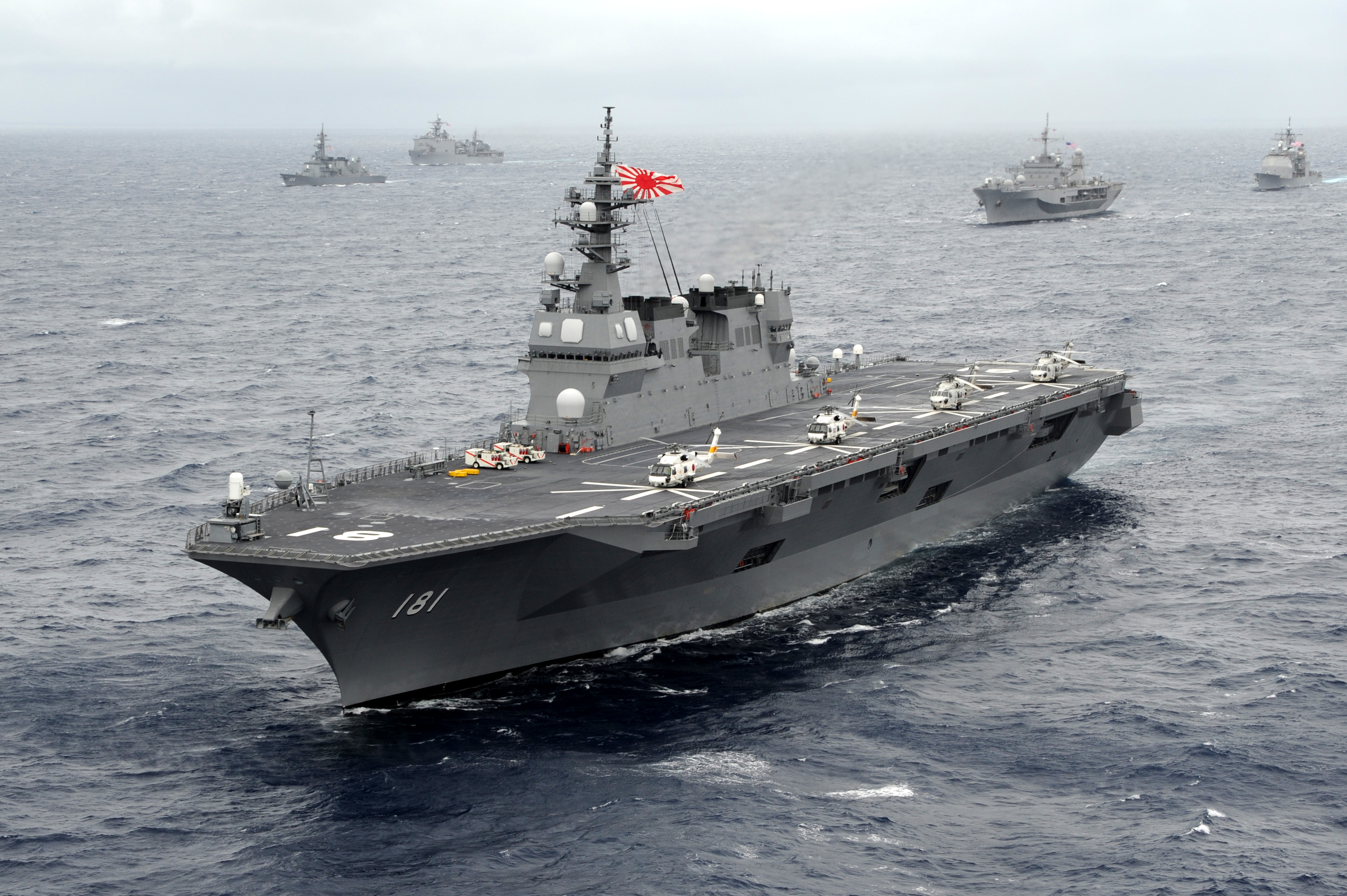
Hyūga-class ASW helicopter carrier

=== Active ===
Japan Maritime Self-Defense Force

- Hyūga class (2009–). ASW, utility, and sea mine clearing helicopters
- Izumo class (2013–). ASW, utility, and sea mine clearing helicopters

Thailand

- HTMS Chakri Naruebet

United States Navy

- Wasp class

== Converted ==
Soviet/Russian Navy

- Kiev class Baku cruiser/carrier; guided missile cruiser/limited air defense/ASW STOVL and helicopters (Sold to India, renamed and reactivated as Vikramaditya.)

Italian Navy

- Giuseppe Garibaldi one ship, ASW helicopter carrier 1985–1988, STOVL fighters and ASW helicopters carrier 1988–2024, planned conversion to KRI Gajah Mada.

=== Retired and scrapped ===
Argentine Navy

- ARA Independencia – (ex-Colossus class) ASW fixed-wing CATOBAR S-2 and helicopters
- ARA Veinticinco de Mayo – (ex-Colossus class) ASW fixed-wing CATOBAR S-2 and helicopters

Brazilian Navy

- Minas Gerais – (ex-Colossus class) ASW fixed-wing CATOBAR and helicopters

French Navy

- Arromanches – (ex-Colossus class) ASW fixed-wing CATOBAR and helicopters

Royal Navy

- HMS Bulwark; Centaur-class aircraft carrier recommissioned in 1979 from reserve as a helicopter ASW carrier.
- HMS Hermes; Centaur-class aircraft carrier converted to helicopter ASW in 1976. (Sold to India, renamed Viraat, then scrapped 2021.)
- Invincible class – three ships Strike/ASW/Amphibious Assault STOVL and helicopters. These ships were originally designed as "through-deck cruisers" for the ASW role and command, but ended up also equipped with Harrier STOVL fighters for fleet defence against Soviet reconnaissance aircraft. After the Falklands War they were used as conventional, albeit light, fleet aircraft carriers in the power projection role. HMS Invincible and HMS Ark Royal retired/scrapped, HMS Illustrious converted to amphibious assault ship, then scrapped 2016.

Royal Australian Navy

- HMAS Melbourne – (Majestic class) strike/ASW fixed-wing CATOBAR and helicopters

Royal Canadian Navy

- HMCS Bonaventure – (ex-Majestic class) ASW fixed-wing CATOBAR and helicopters

Royal Netherlands Navy

- HNLMS Karel Doorman – (ex-Colossus class) ASW (sold to Argentina as , scrapped) fixed-wing CATOBAR and helicopters

Soviet/Russian Navy

- Moskva class; ASW helicopter support ship, large rear deck landing pad and hangar for 18 helicopters Helicopters only

Spanish Navy

- Dédalo – (ex-Independence class) ASW helicopter carrier 1967–1976, STOVL carrier 1976–1989. Strike/ASW STOVL and helicopters
- Príncipe de Asturias one ship STOVL fighters and helicopters 1988–2013

United States Navy

- Essex class – ASW carriers with fixed-wing and helicopter anti-submarine aircraft and AEW aircraft, although occasionally carried an A-4 Skyhawk detachment (4 aircraft) for daytime combat air patrol fixed-Wing CATOBAR and helicopters
- Tarawa class – the landing platform helicopter amphibious assault ships were given secondary roles of sea control meaning they would deploy with a modified air complement consisting of ASW helicopters and a STOVL fighter group for air defense.

== See also ==
- Escort carrier
- Helicopter carrier
- Light aircraft carrier
