= CVS Ferrari =

Italian mobile handling equipment manufacturer

CVS Ferrari S.P.A
- Type: Subsidiary
- Industry: Heavy equipment
- Headquarters: Italy
- Products: Machinery
- Parent: Pagani Holding s.r.l
- Website: CVS Ferrari

CVS Ferrari dates back to the 1940's, when it was previously known as THE FERRARI BELOTTI S.p.A. Belotti was the first company to design and build mobile handling equipment specifically for ports from their manufacturing facility on "Ponte Canepa" wharf.

In July 2002 CVS had acquired Belotti.

== The Belotti days ==
In 1952 Belotti manufactured the first crane, which was able to lift and transport military aircraft. In 1967 Belotti introduced the first container handling straddle carrier with side lifting capability.

The first 100-tonne capacity aircraft transporter was supplied in 1967. Later, Belotti delivered machines to armed forces worldwide which lead the factory to supplied over 1,200 machines worldwide.

== History ==
1973 – The company was founded by Lorenzo, Giuseppe & Luciano Ferrari as manufacturer of crane carriers and special vehicles.

1982 – Terminal and ro-ro tractors were manufactured.

1990 – The company entered in container handling manufacturing with its first Top Loader.

1993 – First family of reachstacker model Ferrari 100 was launched.

1997 – The second generation of reachstackers model Ferrari 200 was introduced in the Market.

2001 – Alliances with Taylor and Komatsu were signed with the aim of becoming global manufacturer of reachstackers.

2002 – Acquisition of the Belotti.

2004 – Acquisition of the Papalini company (ex Kalmar dealer for Italy) to create CVS Service.

2016 – The CVS Ferrari group was split by the Italian group that includes the financial holding company Finint Partners SpA and the industrial group Battioni & Pagani SpA.

2024 - Taylor Group of Louisville, Mississippi acquires 85% of the shares of CVS Ferrari.

== The CVS Ferrari range ==
CVS Ferrari and Ferrari Belotti supply materials handling equipment including yard, terminal and ro-ro tractors, trailers, fork trucks (from 10-45 tonnes), fork trucks for laden/empty container handling, reachstackers for laden/empty container handling, cont-runners, straddle carriers, coil handlers, military aircraft transporters, dumpers for mines, mobile crane carriers, rough terrain container handlers.

== C.V.S. Service ==
=== Activities ===
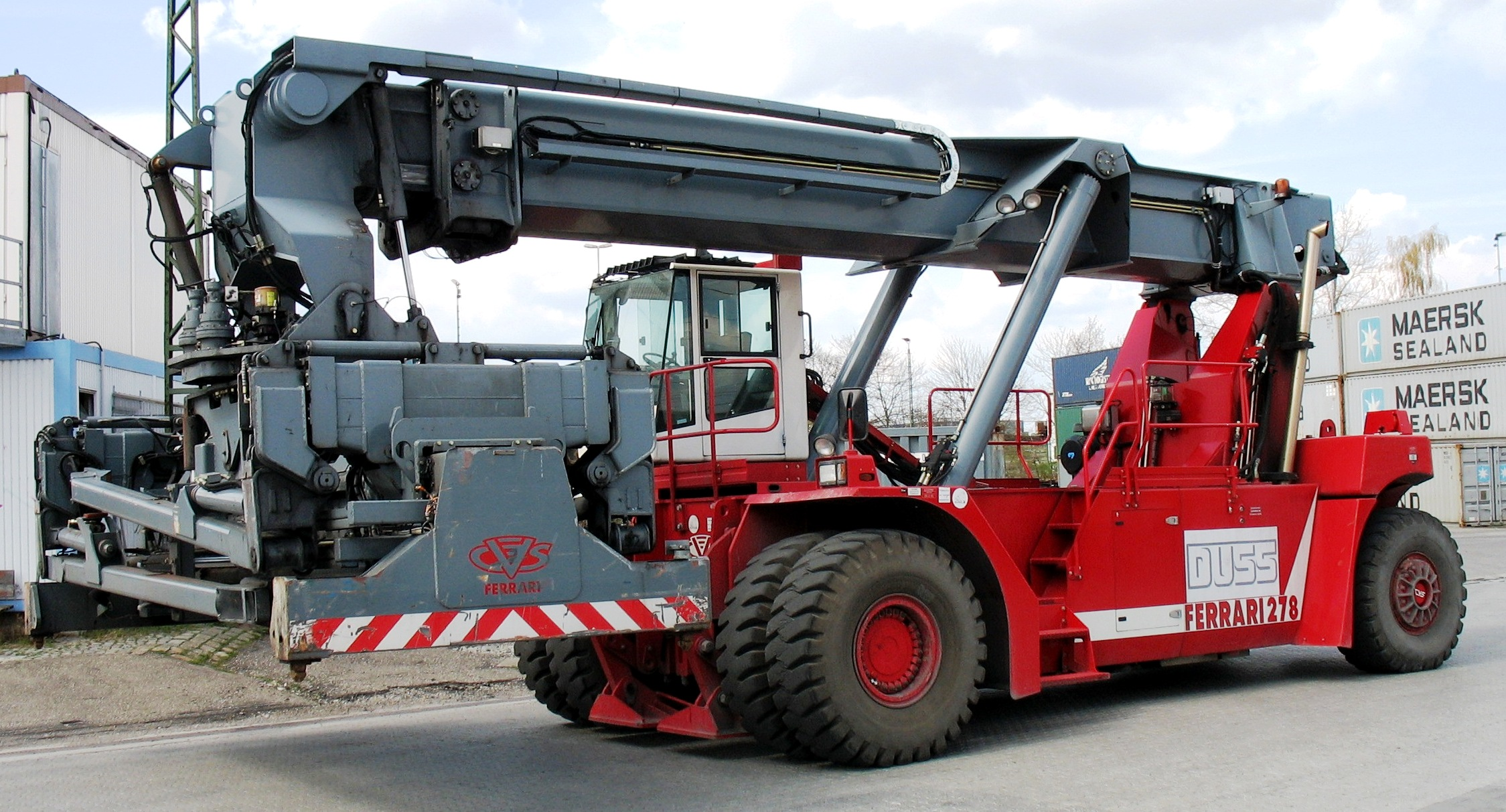
Reach-Stacker

CVS Ferrari acquired CVS Service in 2004. Its headquarters are in Prato, near Florence (Tuscany). Its main activities are:

• Research, development, assembly, installation, selling and hiring of forklift trucks, special vehicles, machines, technological systems for load lifting and moving. All these activities are handled by CVS Service both on its own and upon third parts request;

• Organization of the logistic and integrated management system related to the above-mentioned machines and equipment;

• Service activities such as repairing, maintenance, overhauling, technical and legal advice concerning the above-mentioned machines.

=== Service ===
CVS Service is authorized to operate all around Italy and worldwide on CVS, Ferrari-Belotti and Kalmar machines and to provide assistance to Still forklifts in Tuscany.

=== Internal organization ===
CVS Service employs 33 technicians in four departments, light line, heavy line, internal workshop and external workshop. Technicians are trained on emergency tasks, and are able to work alone or in teams. Each technician is provided with a van supplied with tools. There are 30 vans: 12 for heavy line, 10 for light line, 4 for miscellaneous purposes, 3 for the warehouse and 1 for forklift transport. Service operations conform with norm ISO 9001:2000 (Vision 2000) according to the corporate quality system certified by R.I.N.A.

== Research and development ==
The Technical Department employs 14% of the work force, and develops the Ferrari range of products. It has its own internal Research & Development department.

== See also ==
- List of Italian companies
- Ferrari Belotti
