= List of lighthouses in France =

This is a list of lighthouses in France. It includes the French overseas territories.

== Metropolitan France ==
Name	Image	Water body	Département	Location & coordinates	Year built	Notes
Phare du Cap Leucate		Gulf of Lion	Aude	Cap Leucate; 42°54′5″N 003°03′3″E	1950	
Planier Light		Gulf of Lion	Bouches-du-Rhône	Île du Planier (Planier island); 43°11′54.83″N 5°13′51.29″E	1959	The first tower was built in this location in 1320 by Robert d'Anjou.
Giraglia		Ligurian Sea	Haute-Corse	Giraglia Island, north off Cap Corse	1848	
Héaux de Bréhat Lighthouse		Atlantic Ocean	Côtes-d'Armor	Île-de-Bréhat; 48°54′30″N 3°5′15″W	1840	
Ploumanac'h Lighthouse		Atlantic Ocean	Côtes-d'Armor	Perros-Guirec; 48°50′15″N 3°29′0″W	1946	An older lighthouse dating from 1860 was destroyed in 1944 and replaced by the current structure.
Roches-Douvres Light		Atlantic Ocean	Côtes-d'Armor	Roches-Douvre reef between Île-de-Bréhat and Guernsey; 49°6′18″N 2°48′50″W	1954	At a height of 213 feet (65 m) it is the eleventh-tallest "traditional lighthouse" in the world.
Sept-Îles Lighthouse		Atlantic Ocean	Côtes-d'Armor	Perros-Guirec; 48°52′43″N 3°29′24″W	1854	The first lighthouse, a round tower, was illuminated in May 1835, and then replaced in 1854 by a square tower 16 ft (5 m) taller. Destroyed 4 August 1944, it was rebuilt in 1949 and relit in July 1952.
Triagoz Lighthouse		Atlantic Ocean	Côtes-d'Armor	Triagoz archipelago 48°52′17″N 3°38′47″W	1864	
Ar Men		Atlantic Ocean	Finistère	West of Île de Sein; 48°3′0″N 4°59′54″W	1881	
Phare d'Eckmühl		Atlantic Ocean	Finistère	Penmarc'h; 47°47′19.55″N 4°22′22.23″W	1897	The current tower replaced an older lighthouse constructed in 1835.
La Vieille		Atlantic Ocean	Finistère	Raz de Sein; 48°02′26″N 4°45′23″W	1887	
Phare du Créac'h		Atlantic Ocean	Finistère	Ushant island 48°27′34.23″N 5°7′45.4″W	1863	
Saint-Mathieu Lighthouse		Atlantic Ocean	Finistère	Pointe Saint-Mathieu; 48°19′48″N 4°46′15″W	1835	The lighthouse was classified as a monument historique on 23 May 2011.
Île Vierge Lighthouse		Atlantic Ocean	Finistère	Île Vierge; 48°38′19.9″N 4°34′03.0″W	1902	The current tower replaced an older lighthouse from 1845. The island is open to the public from April to September, as is the lighthouse, by appointment.
La Jument		Atlantic Ocean	Finistère	Off Ushant island 48°25′0″N 5°7′59″W	1911	Jean Guichard's 1989 dramatic storm photo shots of the Jument Lighthouse became an instant hit and earned him the 2nd place in the 1991 World Press Photo award.
Petit Minou Lighthouse		Atlantic Ocean	Finistère	Roadstead of Brest; 48°20′12″N 4°36′51″W	1848	Together with the Phare du Portzic, Petit Minou Lighthouse forms a range of lights into the roadstead.
Phare du Portzic		Atlantic Ocean	Finistère	Roadstead of Brest; 48°21′30″N 4°32′03″W	1848	Together with the Petit Minou Lighthouse, Portzic Lighthouse forms a range of lights into the roadstead.
Tourelle de la Plate		Atlantic Ocean	Finistère	Raz de Sein; 48°2′21″N 4°45′35″W	1910	
Phare de Tévennec		Atlantic Ocean	Finistère	Raz de Sein	1875	
Phare de Nividic		Atlantic Ocean	Finistère	Ouessant; 48°26′44″N 5°09′03″W	1936	At a longitude of 5°09.1' W, this is France's westernmost lighthouse.
Phare de l'île aux Moutons		Atlantic Ocean	Finistère	On an islet 11 kilometres (6.8 mi) southeast of Bénodet	1879	
Phare de l'île Tristan		Atlantic Ocean	Finistère	Tristan Island off Douarnenez	1865	
Phare du Millier		Atlantic Ocean	Finistère	On a headland in the southern part of the Baie de Douarnenez	1881	
Phare des Pierres Noires		Atlantic Ocean	Finistère	On an islet 9 kilometres (5.6 mi) west off Pointe Saint-Mathieu	1872	
Phare de Penfret		Atlantic Ocean	Finistère	Penfret, Glénan islands	1837	
Phare de Roscoff		Atlantic Ocean	Finistère	Roscoff	1917	
Phare de l'île de Batz		Atlantic Ocean	Finistère	Île de Batz	1836	The lighthouse replaced an earlier building from 1705.
Phare de Pontusval		Atlantic Ocean	Finistère	2 kilometres (1.2 mi) northwest of Brignogan-Plages	1869	
Phare du Four		Atlantic Ocean	Finistère	At the northern entrance to the Chenal du Four	1874	
Phare de Kéréon		Atlantic Ocean	Finistère	Situated on a rock called Men Tensel NW of Ile de Bannec; 48°26'30"N 05°01'46"W	1916	The most beautiful lighthouse in France; nicknamed "The Palace" by its Light Keepers. The last manned offshore station in France, automated in 2004.
Phare de l'Espiguette		Gulf of Lion	Gard	Pointe de l'Espiguette; 43°29′16″N 4°8′31″E	1869	
Cordouan Lighthouse		Bay of Biscay	Gironde	Gironde estuary 45°35′10.84″N 1°10′24.48″W	1611	The original tower was raised to 68 metres (223 ft) in the late 18th century.
Phare de Gatteville		English Channel	Manche	Barfleur; 49°41′47.12″N 1°15′57.29″W	1774	At a height of 75 metres (246 ft) it is the third tallest "traditional lighthouse" in the world.
Goulphar Lighthouse		Bay of Biscay	Morbihan	Belle-Île-en-Mer; 47°18′40″N 3°13′39″W	1836	
Phare de La Teignouse		Bay of Biscay	Morbihan	Quiberon; 47°27′27″N 3°2′45″W	1845	
Cap d'Antifer Lighthouse		English Channel	Seine-Maritime	La Poterie-Cap-d'Antifer; 49.6835°N 0.1654°E	1955	
Dunkirk Lighthouse		English Channel	Nord	Near Dunkirk; 51°02′56″N 02°21′51″E	1843	
Phare de Sainte Marie		Gulf of Lion	Provence-Alpes-Côte d'Azur	Marseille harbour	1855	The lighthouse is now inactive.
Île d'Yeu Lighthouse		Bay of Biscay	Vendée	Île d'Yeu; 46°43′03″N 2°22′56″W	1950	The structure, designed by Maurice Durand, is the third serving the site; the original tower, constructed in 1830, was destroyed by German troops near the close of World War II.
L'Armendèche Lighthouse		Bay of Biscay	Vendée	Les Sables-d'Olonne; 46°29′23″N 01°48′17″W	1968	The lighthouse was designed by Maurice Durand.
Pointe des Corbeaux Lighthouse		Bay of Biscay	Vendée	Île d'Yeu; 46°41′24″N 2°17′06″W	1950	The lighthouse was designed by Maurice Durand.
Pointe du Grouin du Cou Lighthouse		Bay of Biscay	Vendée	Pointe du Grouin du Cou; 46°20′40″N 1°27′49″W	1953	The lighthouse was designed by Maurice Durand.

== French overseas departments and territories ==
- List of lighthouses in Guadeloupe
- List of lighthouses in French Guiana
- List of lighthouses in Mayotte
- List of lighthouses in Martinique
- List of lighthouses in New Caledonia
- List of lighthouses in French Polynesia
- List of lighthouses in Réunion
- List of lighthouses in Saint Barthélemy
- List of lighthouses in the Collectivity of Saint Martin
- List of lighthouses in Saint Pierre and Miquelon
- List of lighthouses in the French Southern and Antarctic Lands
- List of lighthouses in Wallis and Futuna

== See also ==
- Lists of lighthouses
