= Nividic Lighthouse =

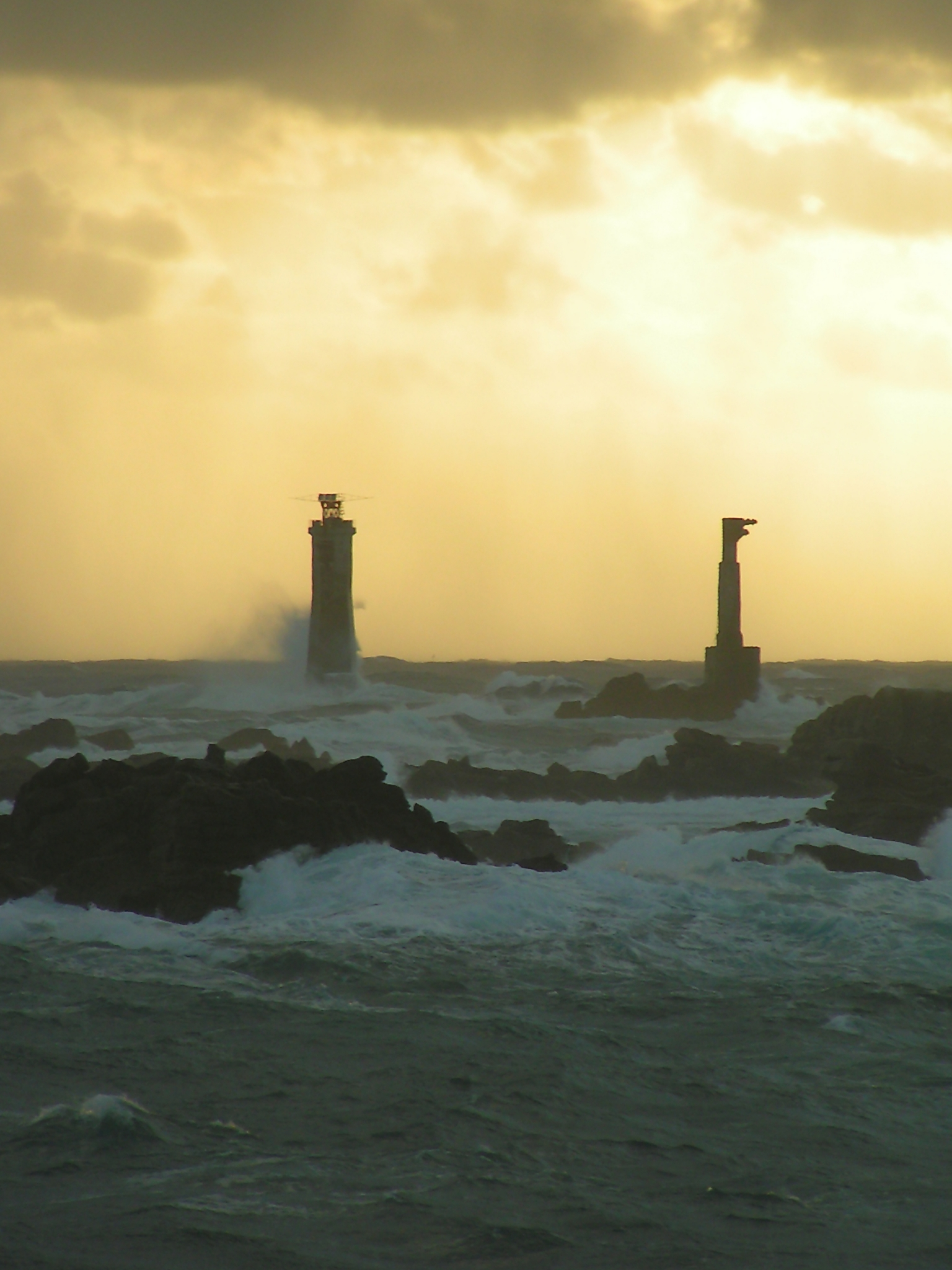
- Nividic Lighthouses
- Location: Ushant, Brittany; France
- Coordinates: 48.445757°N 5.150893°W

Tower
- Constructed: 1912
- Construction: stone tower
- Automated: 1936
- Height: 36 metres (118 ft)
- Shape: octagonal tower with balcony and lantern
- Markings: unpainted tower
- Power source: solar power
- Heritage: classified historical monument

Light
- Focal height: 28 metres (92 ft)
- Range: 10 nmi (19 km; 12 mi)
- Characteristic: Q (9) W 10s.

Nividic Lighthouse (Phare de Nividic; Breton: Tour-tan Nividic) is one of five major lighthouses on Ushant in Brittany. The others are the Phare du Créac'h, the Stiff lighthouse (from Breton Stiv), Kéréon and La Jument. Built in 1912, the Phare de Nividic was the first automatic lighthouse in the world. It has been a listed monument since 2017.

== History ==
The lighthouse was built from 1912 to 1936, but only operated for 4 years. Abandoned when German troops occupied the Ushant, it was returned to service in the early 1950s. On a proposal from the National Commission for Historical Monuments, the Minister of Culture and Communication classified it as a historical monument on April 20, 2017.

=== Planning ===
The decision to build the Nividic Lighthouse was signed on January 5, 1910. The Lighthouses service wanted at the time to reuse the construction team of the La Jument Lighthouse, located less than 3km further south, and whose construction was to be completed in 1911. The initial cost was estimated at 160,000 gold francs, which is little compared to the (estimated) cost of La Jument (850,000 francs at the time).

The work was placed under the direction of Messrs. Pigeaud and Montigny, respectively chief engineer and ordinary engineer from Brest. Chief Engineer Heurté, from the Ouessant subdivision, would be superintendent of the construction site.

=== Construction ===
On March 9, 1912, a preliminary design was unveiled, indicating the general shape, materials, and construction techniques to be used. At the time, the illuminating equipment had not been selected, as the lighthouse was designed to be fully automated and controlled from facilities at La Créac'h.

Masonry work began in the summer of 1912, a year after the commissioning of La Jument. Due to the violent currents and reefs in the Iroise Sea, site access was difficult, and the construction process was extremely dangerous. For this reason, the construction team who had just completed La Jument was chosen for this mission.

Hazardous conditions only made it possible to erect about fifty cubic meters of masonry per year between 1913 and 1916. The First World War had no impact on the progress of the work. On the other hand, the discovery of foundation damage at La Jument in 1917-18 forced the construction team to slow down its work to undertake consolidation work on the damaged foundation. Nevertheless, by 1926, the tower at Nividic had risen 26 meters above the level of the rock.

The tower reached its final height in 1929. A concrete belt strengthening the base of the lighthouse was added due to fears expressed by engineer Cône. The structural work of the lighthouse was completed in 1933.

The illuminating equipment was selected on March 19, 1928, by the supervising ministry, which proposed the construction of first three, then finally two concrete pylons, an overhead power line and a small cable car. An intermediate solution, to pass an underwater cable, was at the time too expensive and too little sustainable.

Lighting and foghorn installations were installed between 1929 and 1936. The gas emergency light was operational from October 1931, and the station was tested beginning in the early summer of 1933, before being commissioned in 1936.

=== Operational history ===
For four years following its commissioning, the lighthouse operated without any particular problems. The beginning of the Second World War marked the end of this period. The fire was extinguished following the arrival of German troops on the island of Ouessant in 1940. For strategic reasons, the German command decided to extinguish all the lighthouses on the coast, including Nividic. In 1943, after 3 years of abandonment, the cable system succumbed to corrosion, rendering access to the lighthouse impossible by land.

Between 1945 and 1952, the lighthouse was abandoned for lack of access and power. While the cable car system was never rebuilt, attempts were made to return the light to service using the gas-powered emergency beacon. The difficulty of access nevertheless prevented the proper maintenance of the beacon, which regularly went out.

In 1953, a new electrical cable was installed, but the light was still plagued by reliability problems. Due to bad weather, no visit could occur until August 1955. Following advancements in technology, in 1958 a temporary wooden helipad, 5 meters square, was built atop the lantern room. This was the first French lighthouse to be made accessible by helicopter, and allowed a much more extensive renovation of the installation. Renovation began in May 1959 and required 206 flights to complete.

During 1971, the wooden platform was replaced by lighter and more weather resistant metal platform. At this time the cable power supply was definitively abandoned, replaced by a gas supply. The new helipad allowed regular refuelling, finally making the operation of the lighthouse more reliable.

In 1996, the light was re-electrified and solarized with the installation of 9 photovoltaic panels and a battery bank.

== See also ==
- List of lighthouses in France
