= Guichard =

Guichard is a French surname, and may refer to:

- Claire Guichard (born 1967), French politician
- Éric Guichard (born 1953), French cinematographer
- Jean Guichard (born 1952), French photographer
- Joseph Guichard (1806-1880), French impressionist painter
- Karl Gottlieb Guichard (1724-1775), German soldier and military writer
- Louis Pierre Guichard (1889–1986), French member of the resistance, mayor of the French city of Gargilesse-Dampierre.
- Mickaël Guichard (born 1993), French cyclist
- Olivier Guichard (1920–2004), French politician
- Xavier Guichard (1870-1947), French police detective and writer. He appears as a fictional character in works by Georges Simenon
