= Amédée Lighthouse =

Lighthouse in New Caledonia

Amédée lighthouse
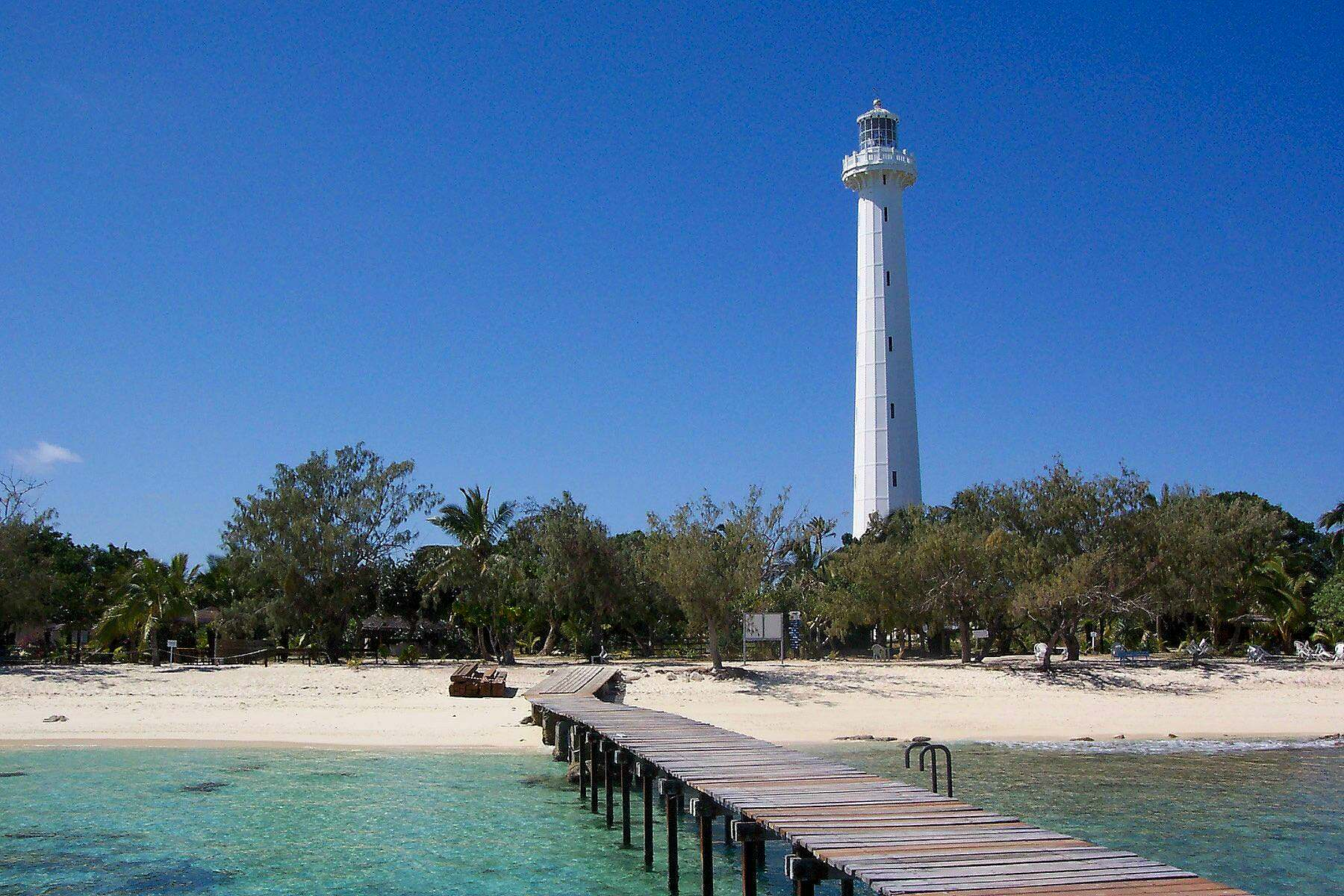
- Location: Nouméa, New Caledonia
- Coordinates: 22.477330°S 166.467952°E

Tower
- Constructed: 1865
- Construction: cast iron tower
- Automated: 1985
- Height: 56 metres (184 ft)
- Shape: 16-side tapered tower with balcony and lantern
- Markings: white tower and lantern
- Power source: solar power
- Operator: French lighthouses and sea-marks service

Light
- Focal height: 52 metres (171 ft)
- Lens: 250 mm lens
- Intensity: 30,000 candela
- Range: 20 nautical miles (37 km; 23 mi)
- Characteristic: Fl (2) W 15s.

The Amédée Lighthouse (French: Phare Amédée) is an iron lighthouse located on Amédée Island in New Caledonia, 24 kilometres (15 mi; 13 nmi) from Nouméa on Grande Terre.

The metal components were made by Rigolet in North-East Paris in 1862 and the tower was constructed in Paris as a demonstration. It was then disassembled into pieces weighing a total of 387,953 kilograms (855,290 lb) and transported along the River Seine to the port of Le Havre for its voyage to New Caledonia. At 56 metres (184 ft) tall, with 247 steps, it is one of the tallest lighthouses in the world and it was the first metallic lighthouse constructed in France. Its foundation stone was laid on 18 January 1865 and it was first lit on 15 November 1865, the saint day of the Empress Eugénie, wife of Napoleon III. Its light signals the entrance to the passage of Boulari, one of only three natural passages in the reef surrounding New Caledonia. On the other side of the world, the original Roches-Douvres Light in the English Channel was the twin of the Amédée Lighthouse. It is now a very popular tourist attraction.

== History ==
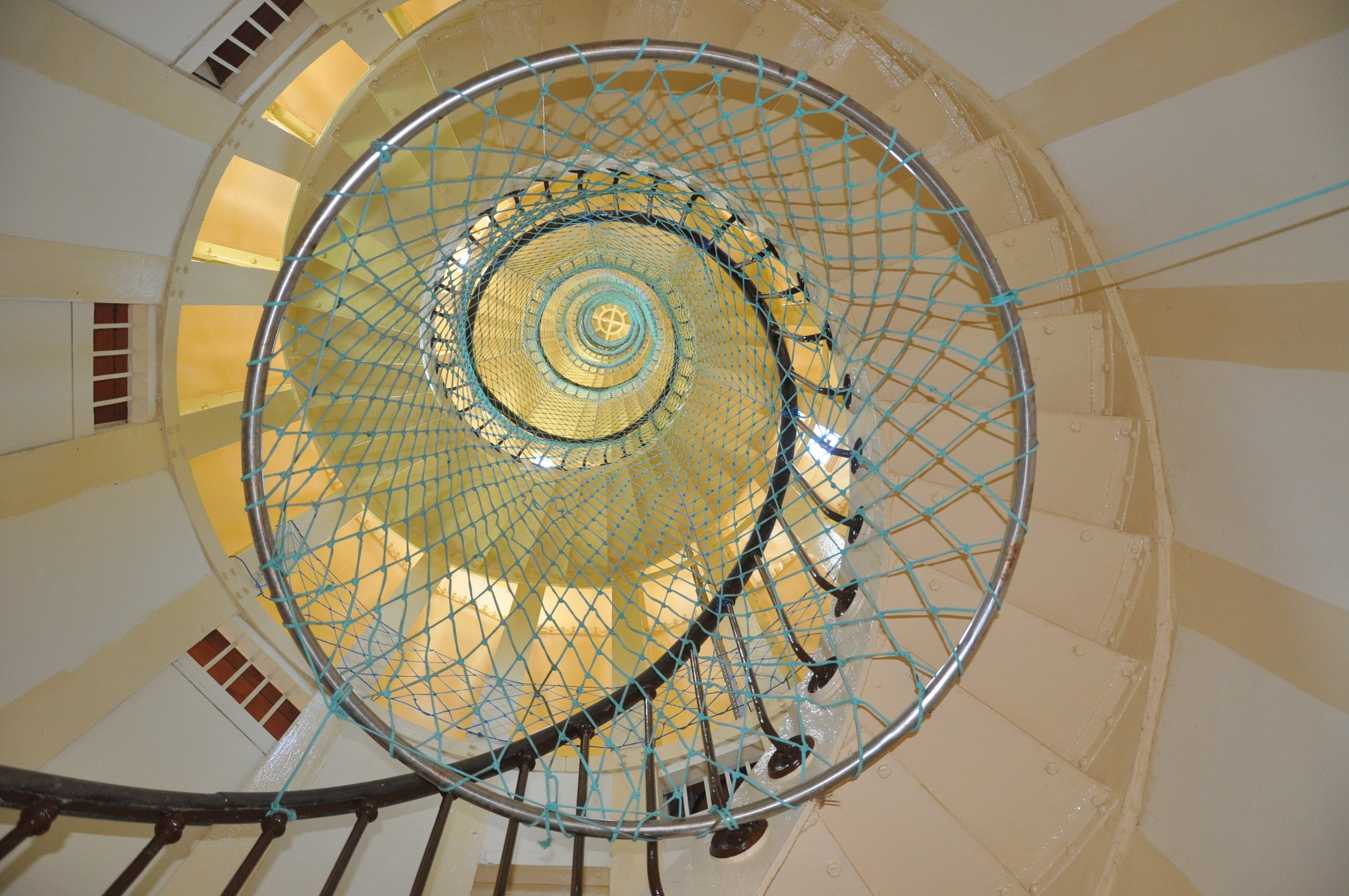
Spiral stairway in Amédée lighthouse

In 1859, the acting Commandant of New Caledonia, Jean-Marie Saisset, asked the government in Paris to build a lighthouse to help ships navigating into the port of Nouméa (then Fort-de-France), particularly as the colony had been chosen as a new destination for French convicts.

Taking into account the lack of stonemasons and other skilled workers in the colony, the French lighthouse commission proposed a pre-fabricated iron design, a relatively new method first used in 1841 by the British consulting engineer Alexander Gordon for the Morant Point Lighthouse in Jamaica. The French Minister for the Navy and the Colonies, Prosper de Chasseloup-Laubat, approved the project and appointed Léonce Reynaud, who had already designed many lighthouses and who had also designed the original Gare du Nord in Paris, to oversee it.

Reynaud followed Gordon in making the pieces out of puddled iron, and in keeping the lighthouse narrow enough to be constructed without scaffolding. He innovated by keeping the internal structure independent of the external envelope: this was intended as protection against corrosion in the humid tropical environment for which he was designing the lighthouse. The plans were exhibited at the 1862 International Exhibition in London.

The metalwork was fabricated in four months by Rigolet, who were then required to construct the tower near their works in the 19th arrondissement of Paris as a demonstration of its stability. The lighthouse remained in Paris from July 1862 to June 1864 and became a popular destination for Parisians' walks. The pieces, packed in 1,200 crates and weighing 388 tonnes (382 long tons; 428 short tons), were transported to Le Havre by barge and then shipped to New Caledonia, arriving in November 1864.

The lighthouse was constructed on Amédée island by a mixed team of French soldiers and local workers under the direction of Louis-Émile Bertin, later to be a major naval architect both for France and for Japan. It was lit for the first time on 15 November 1865, the saint's day of the Empress Eugénie, wife of Napoléon III.

== Important Bird Area ==
The 4-hectare (9.9-acre) Amédée Island has been recognised as an Important Bird Area (IBA) by BirdLife International because it supports a breeding colony of some 240 fairy terns, as estimated in 2012.

== See also ==
- List of lighthouses in New Caledonia
- List of lighthouses in France
