= Île d'Yeu Lighthouse =

Lighthouse in Vendée, France

Île d'Yeu lighthouse Grand Phare de l'Île d'Yeu
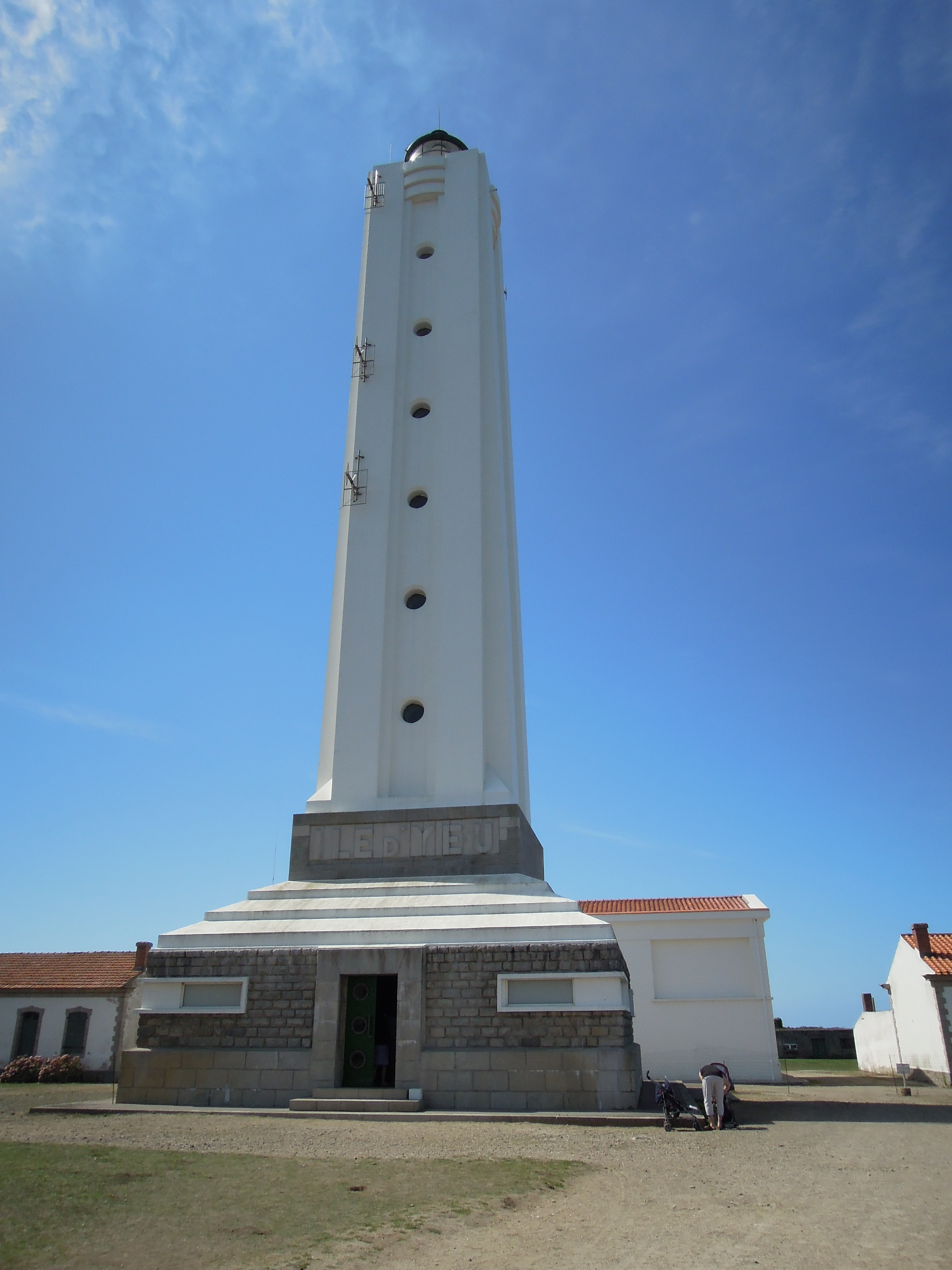
- The tower in 2011
- Location: Île d'Yeu, L'Île-d'Yeu, France
- Coordinates: 46°43′03″N 2°22′56″W

Tower
- Constructed: 1950
- Designed by: Maurice Durand
- Construction: concrete
- Automated: 1980, 1990
- Height: 37.5 m (123 ft)
- Shape: square
- Markings: White (tower), green (lantern)
- Power source: mains electricity
- Heritage: monument historique inscrit,

Light
- First lit: 1 May 1950
- Focal height: 56 m (184 ft)
- Intensity: 440,000 candela
- Range: 25.5 nmi (47.2 km; 29.3 mi)
- Characteristic: Fl W 5s
- Original tower
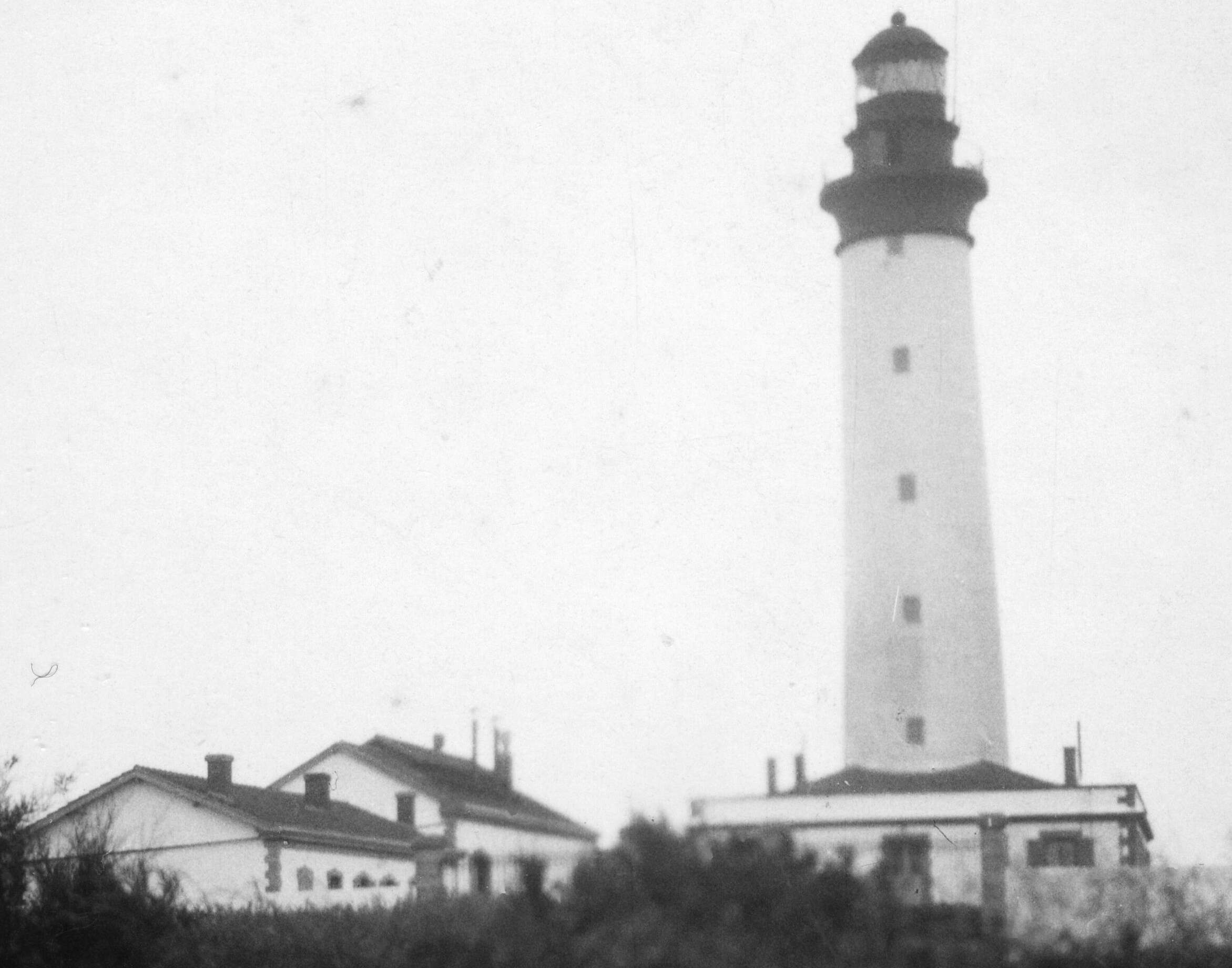
- The first lighthouse in 1935
- Height: 108 ft (33 m)
- Shape: cylinder
- First lit: 15 October 1830
- Lens: first order Fresnel lens
- Characteristic: F W (–1895), Fl W 5s (1895–)

The Île d'Yeu Lighthouse, sometimes called the Grand Phare (Great Lighthouse) or La Petite Foule, is a French lighthouse constructed on the Île d'Yeu in 1950. The current structure, is the third serving the site.

The first lighthouse at the site, a masonry building 108 feet tall constructed in 1830, was destroyed by German troops near the close of World War II. It was replaced by a temporary tower while work was completed on a third light. This, the current tower, is a little taller, 125 feet tall, and was designed in the Art Deco style by Maurice Durand. Made of concrete and painted white, its lantern is black, while the base is built of grey stone. Several one-storey keeper's dwellings and other outbuildings serve the station.

== Before the lighthouse ==
For many years, sailors from Gascony had been clamoring for some sort of signal light to mark the Île d'Yeu. The site was between the ranges of two lighthouses, those at La Baleine and at La Chaume, both of which showed a fixed light. In 1765, an engineer named Barbier attempted to place a lantern on the belfry of the Church of Saint-Sauveur; this attempt was unsuccessful, as was a later plan by the Chevalier des Isles, suggested in 1788, that called for the construction of a light tower at Petite-Foule on the island. Legend holds that the bell tower had at one time shown a light, but this is false. A new tower, 65 feet tall, was built on top of the church in 1774. Construction was supported by the state, according to the demands of the chambers of commerce of Nantes and Bordeaux, and the tower was to be used both as a landmark and as a watchtower. As it happened, the new tower was soon to be put to good use, and local sailors used it to watch British ship movements between 1776 and 1778. In 1811 the War Department isolated the tower from the rest of the church with the construction of an exterior staircase.

Military use of the bell tower continued between 1804 and 1828; in the latter year the structure was returned to control of the commune, who refused to maintain it. In 1833, important repairs were carried out on the tower. Nevertheless, a pronouncement of 18 April 1836 found that it was not fair to force the commune to maintain the bell tower in its then-current state, given that it could be either removed or shortened without doing damage to the church itself. As it was eventually decided that the tower was of essential importance to the island, the state agreed to subsidize repairs, allotting 3000 gold francs for the purpose in 1837. Ten years later the same issue arose, and was dealt with in the same fashion. The old tower stood, being badly damaged in a 1952 storm, before being destroyed in a fire the following year; it was rebuilt in its former form in 1954.

== First lighthouse ==
The first lighthouse on the site was formally opened on 15 October 1830; it showed a fixed white light from a first-order Fresnel lens. The tower was 108 feet tall, and cylindrical in shape. The lighthouse was electrified in 1895, at which time its characteristic was changed to show a white flash every five seconds. It was reinforced and fitted with a new lighting apparatus in 1912. This tower was destroyed by retreating German soldiers on 25 August 1944; it was quickly replaced with a temporary tower.

== Present lighthouse ==
The current lighthouse stands on the heights of the island, just above its airport, and was first lit on 1 May 1950. Just like its predecessor, it shows a single flash every five seconds. This tower was automated in 1980. It is one of two lighthouses on the island designed by Durand; the other is that at the Pointe des Corbeaux, which was constructed in the same year.

On 29 September 2025, the lighthouse went dark. This is part of a pre-planned upgrade effort to replace the current lantern tank with a new generation oil-bath system. Whilst this is ongoing, it can only run its low-range backup light. Nautical information notices have been shared to inform mariners, and the works should conclude by the 10th October 2025. The lighthouse remains closed to the public during this period and plans to re-open in April 2026.

== See also ==
- List of lighthouses in France
