= Créac'h Lighthouse =

Lighthouse in Finistère, France

Phare du Creach
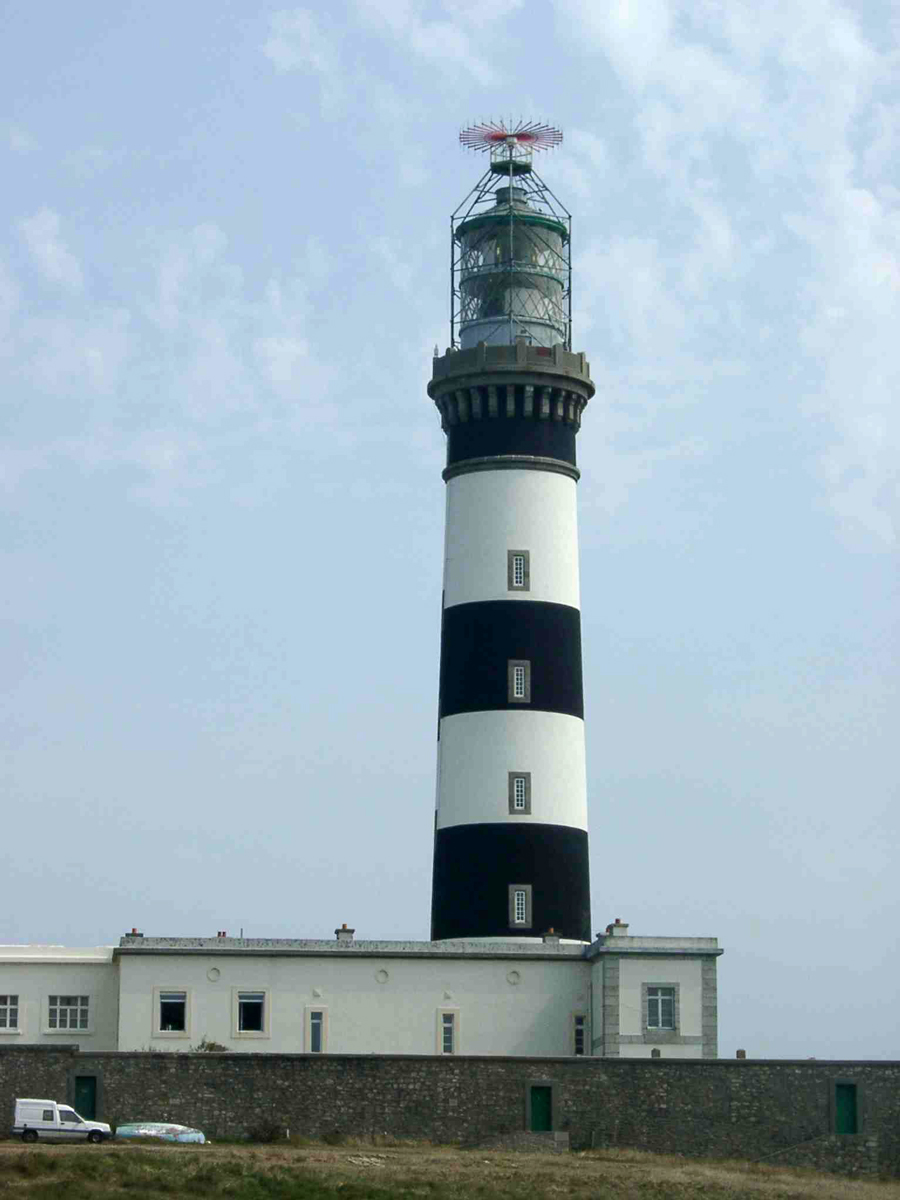
- The lighthouse as seen from the island of Ushant.
- Location: Ushant, France (offshore)
- Coordinates: 48.459241°N 5.128983°W

Tower
- Constructed: 1863
- Construction: stone tower
- Automated: 1988
- Height: 54.85 metres (180.0 ft)
- Shape: cylindrical tower with balcony and lantern rising from 2-story keeper's house
- Markings: white and black horizontal bands
- Power source: mains electricity
- Operator: Service des phares et balises
- Heritage: classified historical monument

Light
- First lit: 19 December 1863
- Focal height: 70 metres (230 ft)
- Lens: 1st order Fresnel lens
- Range: 37.5 nautical miles (69.5 km; 43.2 mi)
- Characteristic: Fl (2) W 10s.

Phare du Créac'h or Kreac'h lighthouse or Créac'h lighthouse (Breton: Tour-tan ar C'hreac'h pronounced [tur.ˈtãːn ar xrɛːx]) is a lighthouse in Ushant, France. It is the most powerful in Europe and one of the most powerful in the world. It stands close to La Jument Lighthouse and the Nividic Lighthouse. It has been a listed monument since 2011.

== See also ==
- List of lighthouses in France

== Gallery ==
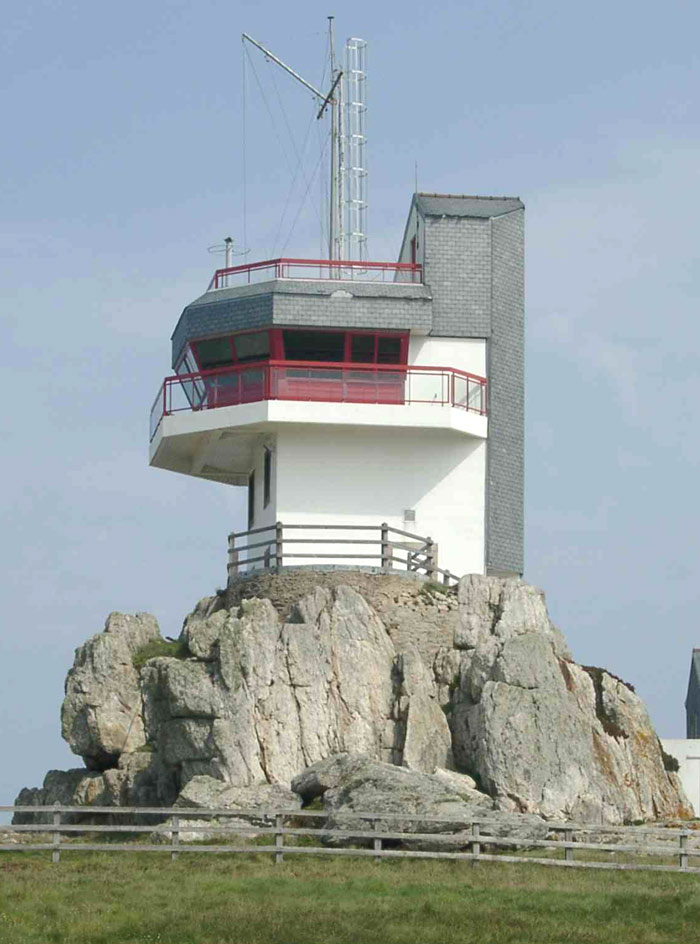
Semaphore

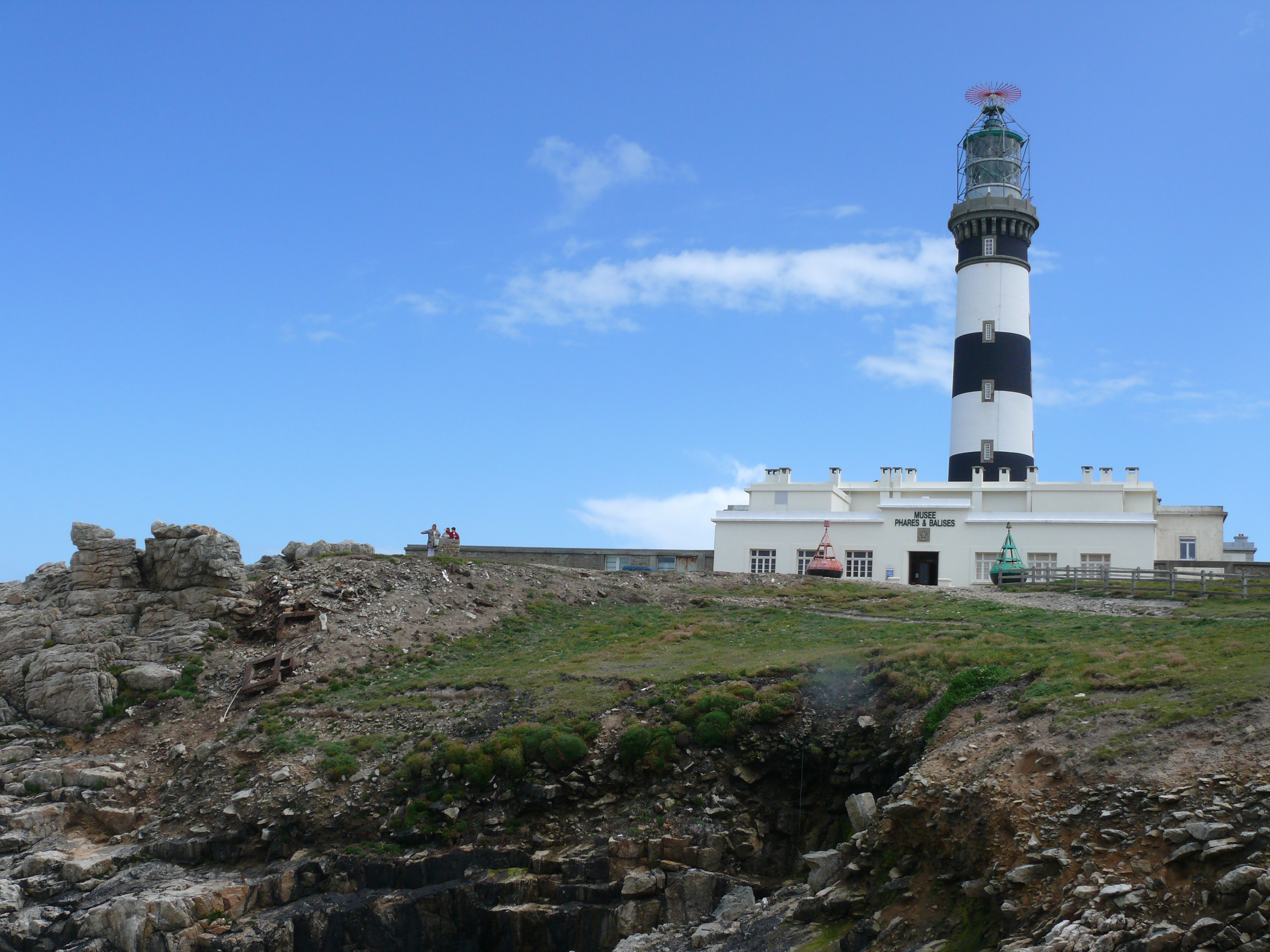
Kreac'h lighthouse

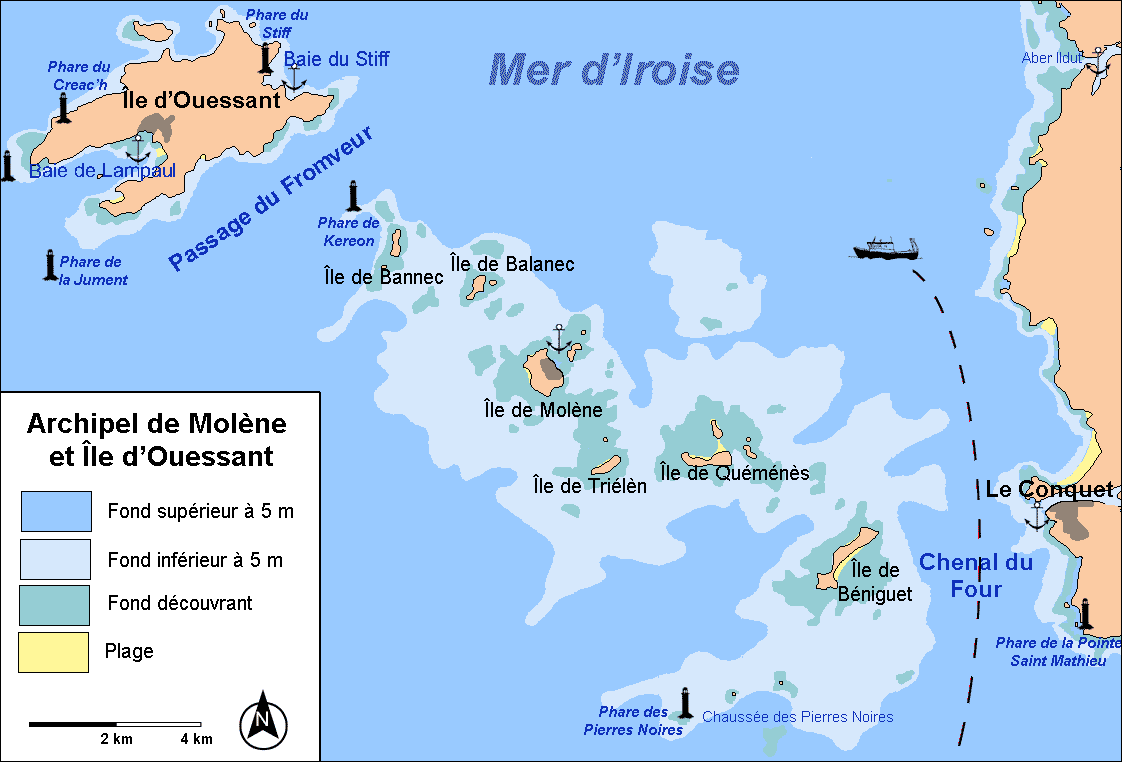
