= Île de Batz Lighthouse =

Lighthouse in France

Île de Batz Lighthouse Phare de l'île de Batz
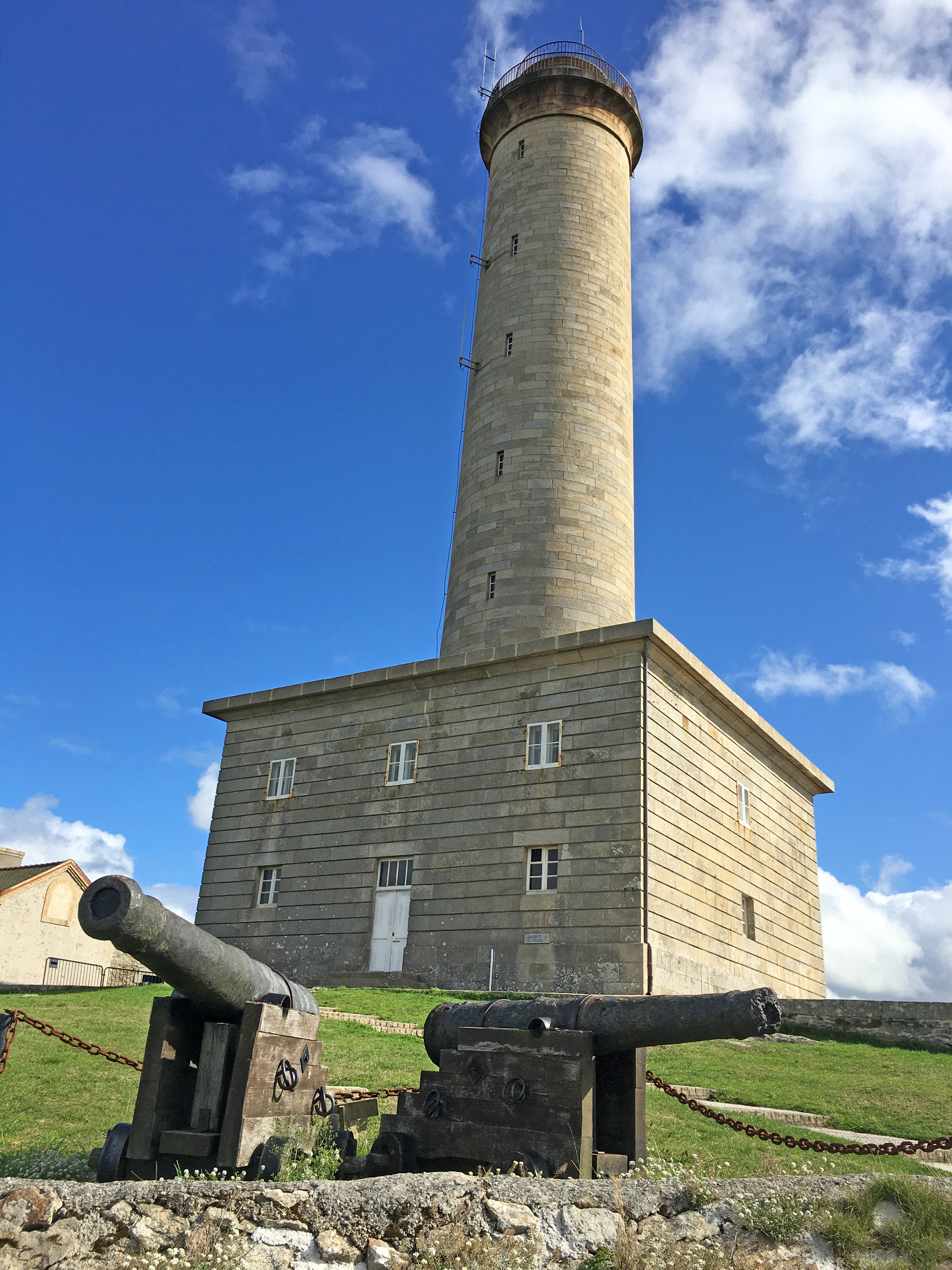
- Location: Île-de-Batz, Finistère, France
- Coordinates: 48.745283°N 4.026917°W

Tower
- Constructed: 1836
- Construction: 1834-1836
- Automated: 1995
- Height: 42.6 m (140 ft)
- Heritage: classified historical monument

Light
- Focal height: 69 m (226 ft) (white), 65 m (213 ft) (red)
- Range: 23 nmi (43 km; 26 mi) (white), 7 nmi (13 km; 8.1 mi) (red)
- Characteristic: Fl(4) W 25s, F R

The Île de Batz Lighthouse (French: Phare de l'île de Batz), formerly called the Phare de l'ile de Bas, is a first-order French lighthouse built on a high point in the western part of the island of Île de Batz in France.

== History ==
From the beginning of the 18th century, a lighthouse was considered for this location.

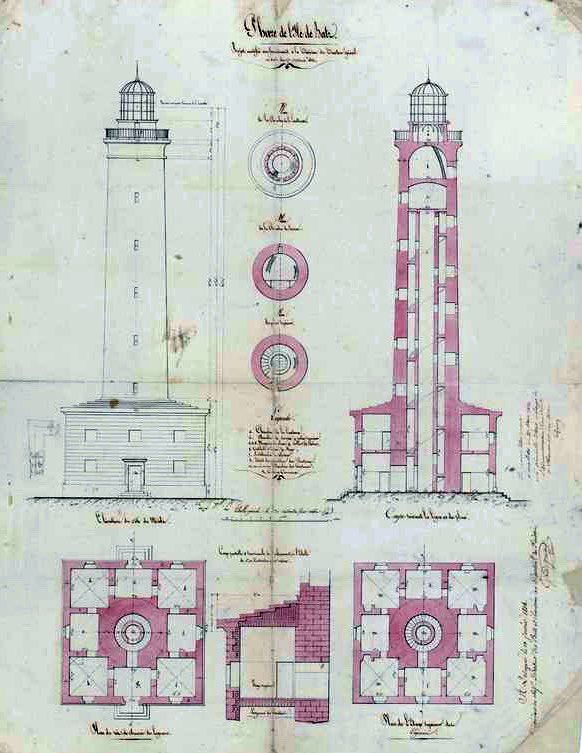
Plans for the lighthouse, 1834.

The construction contract was awarded on December 6, 1833, for a cost of 86,854.93 francs. It was won by Brest-based company Martin. Construction began in 1834. During this first phase, it fell behind schedule because engineers imposed partial demolitions due to construction defects.

== Monument historique ==
It was listed as a monument historique on 31 December 2015. On the recommendation of the National Commission for Historic Monuments, the Minister of Culture and Communication classified the lighthouse as a historic monument on April 20, 2017.

== See also ==
- List of lighthouses in France
- Île-de-Batz
- Jardin Georges Delaselle
