= Roches-Douvres Light =

Lighthouse in Côtes-d'Armor, France

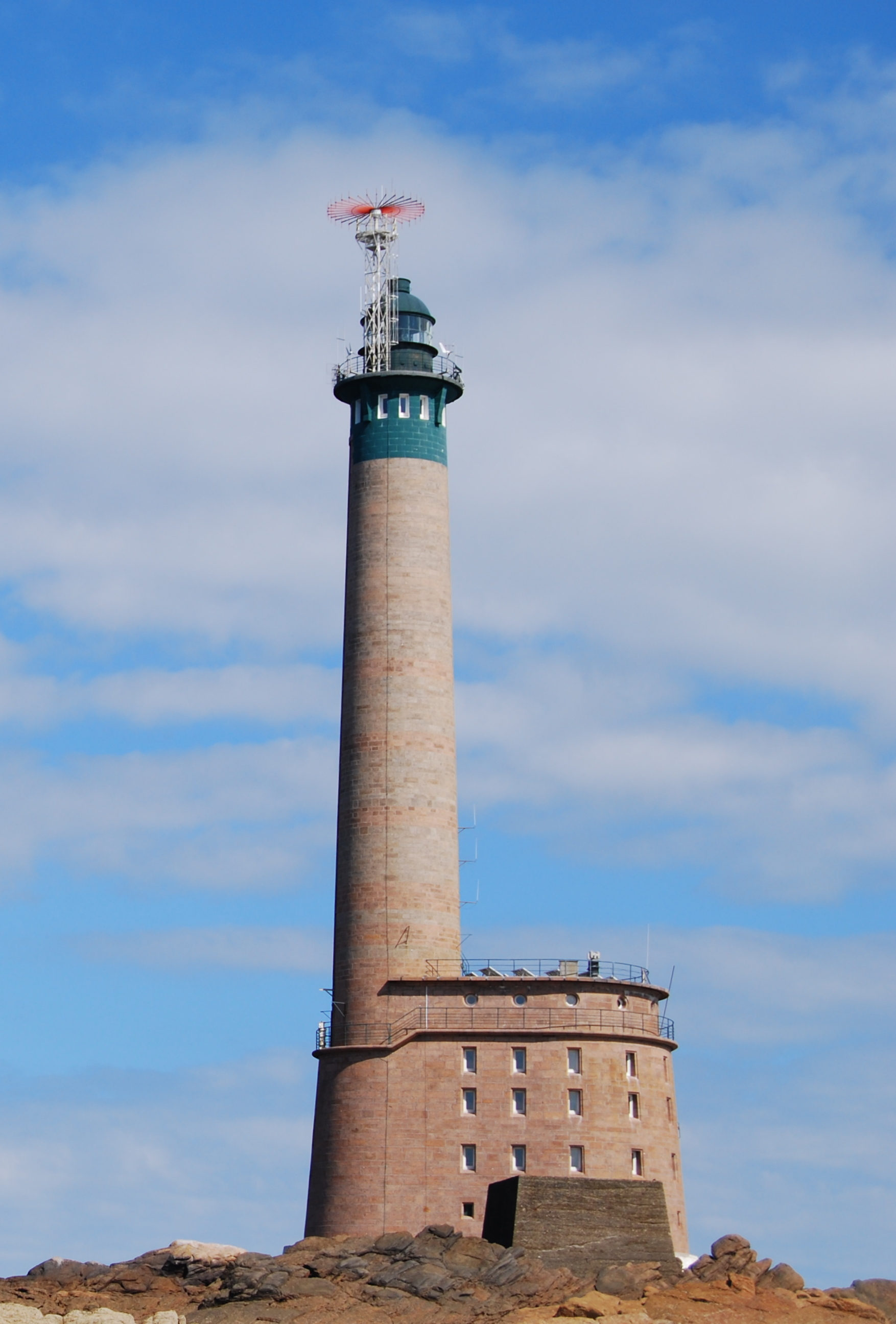
- Roches-Douvres Light, 2009
- Location: Plateau des Roches-Douvres, Île-de-Bréhat, France
- Coordinates: 49°06′18″N 2°48′50″W

Tower
- Constructed: 1954
- Construction: stone
- Automated: 2000
- Height: 64.2 m (211 ft)
- Shape: cylinder
- Markings: unpainted (tower), green (lantern)
- Operator: French lighthouses and sea-marks service
- Heritage: classified historical monument

Light
- First lit: 19 June 1954
- Focal height: 60 m (200 ft)
- Range: 24 nmi (44 km; 28 mi)
- Characteristic: Fl W 5s
- Original light
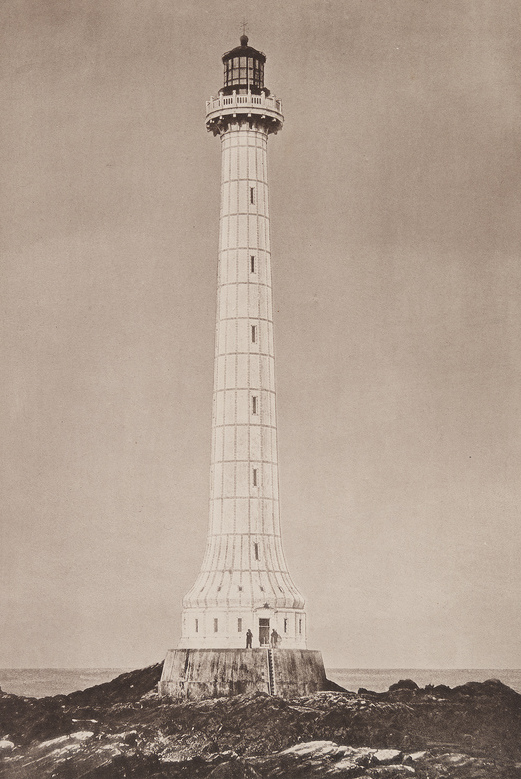
- Constructed: 1866, 1867, 6 August 1869
- Construction: cast iron, puddled iron
- Height: 58 m (190 ft)
- Operator: French lighthouses and sea-marks service
- First lit: 15 December 1868
- Deactivated: August 1944
- Characteristic: Fl W 4s

Roches-Douvres Light is an active lighthouse in Côtes-d'Armor, France built atop a 5-story elliptical stone dwelling. At a height of 213 feet (65 m) it is the eleventh-tallest "traditional lighthouse" in the world.

It is located on the Roches-Douvres, a very dangerous reef, completely covered at high tide but exposed at low tide, between the islands of Brehat and Guernsey in the English Channel. It is claimed to be the waveswept lighthouse farthest from mainland in Europe, about 30 kilometres (19 mi) off the French coast. The location is accessible only by boat in very rough seas. Both the site and the tower are closed to the public.

== History ==
The original 1868 lighthouse was a cast iron tower, 190 feet (58 m) tall, tapering to a mere 13 feet (4 m) in diameter at the top. It was a twin to Amédée Lighthouse. The tower was constructed from elements which were built by Rigolet in Paris. The tower was constructed for the first time in 1866 on Champ de Mars, Paris, for the Exposition Universelle of 1867. It was then disassembled and the parts were transferred to Brehat. The light was first lit on 15 December 1868 during the construction, with a characteristic of white flash every 4s. Actual construction was only completed in August 1869.

On 18 June 1903 the fuel was changed to petroleum.

The lighthouse was destroyed in 1944 during World War II by German troops.

In April 1950 a temporary light was mounted on a 17 metres (56 ft) pylon.

In April 1952 a light was mounted on the tower under construction. The construction was completed on 19 June 1954 and the light to the current specification. In July 1971 the light was electrified, where electricity comes from two wind turbines on towers of concrete and a generator. In October 2000 the lighthouse was automated.

== See also ==
- List of tallest lighthouses in the world
- List of lighthouses in France
