= Dunkirk Lighthouse =

Lighthouse in Nord, France

Dunkirk Lighthouse Phare du Fort Risban
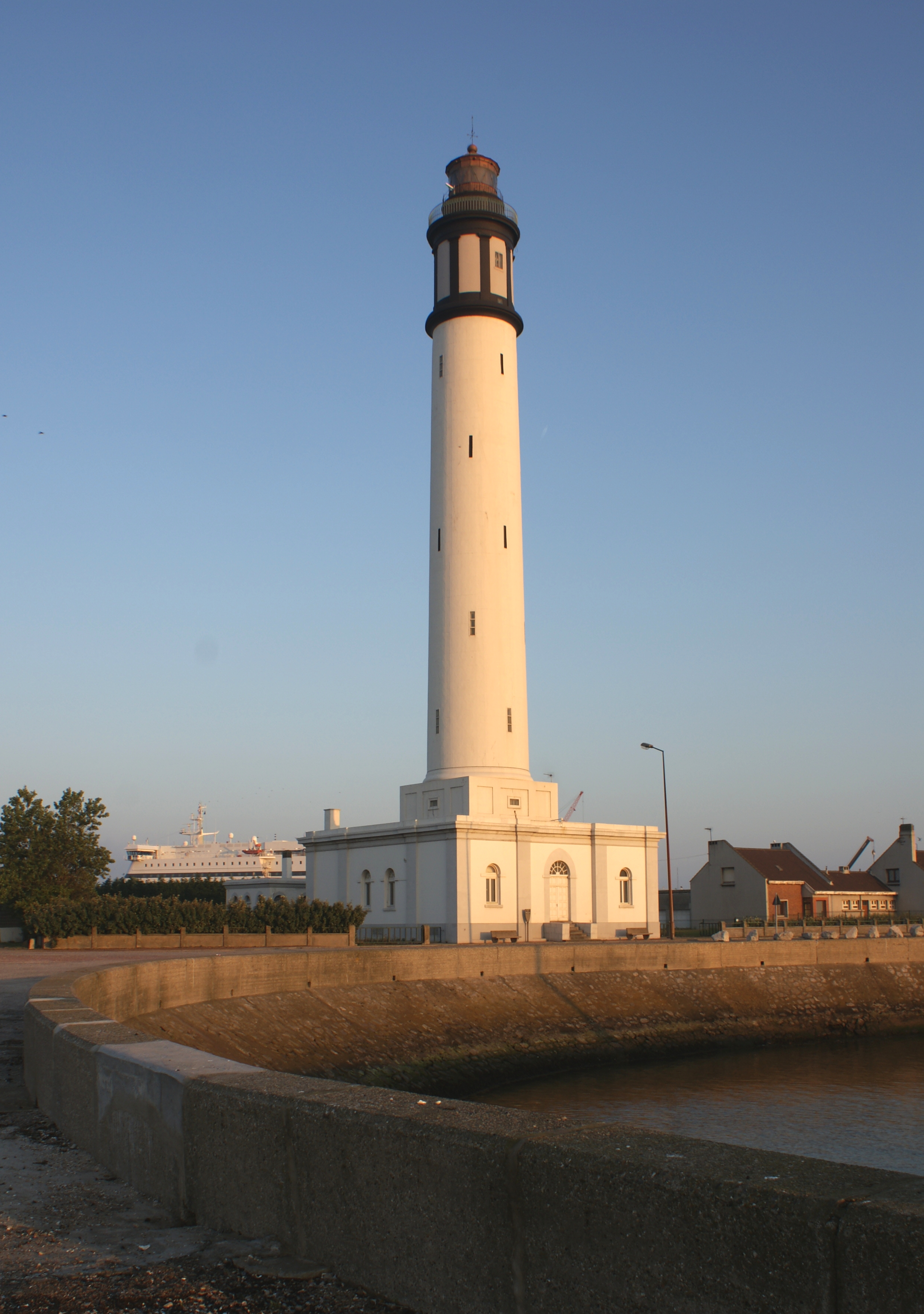
- Location: Dunkirk, France
- Coordinates: 51°02′56″N 2°21′52″E

Tower
- Constructed: 1683 (first)
- Construction: bricks tower
- Automated: 1985
- Height: 63 metres (207 ft)
- Shape: cylinder tower with balcony and lantern centered on 1-story building
- Markings: white tower, black balcony, brown lantern
- Heritage: classified historical monument

Light
- First lit: 1838
- Focal height: 60 metres (200 ft)
- Lens: first order Fresnel lens
- Range: 26 nmi (48 km; 30 mi)
- Characteristic: Fl (2) W 10s.

Dunkirk Lighthouse (French: Phare de Dunkerque or Phare de Risban) is an automated first order (i.e. 60 km beam or further) port lighthouse, the highest of this type in France. It is sited near Dunkirk. Construction of the lighthouse was completed in 1843.

== See also ==
- List of lighthouses in France
