= L'Armendèche Lighthouse =

Lighthouse in Vendée, France

L'Armendèche lighthouse
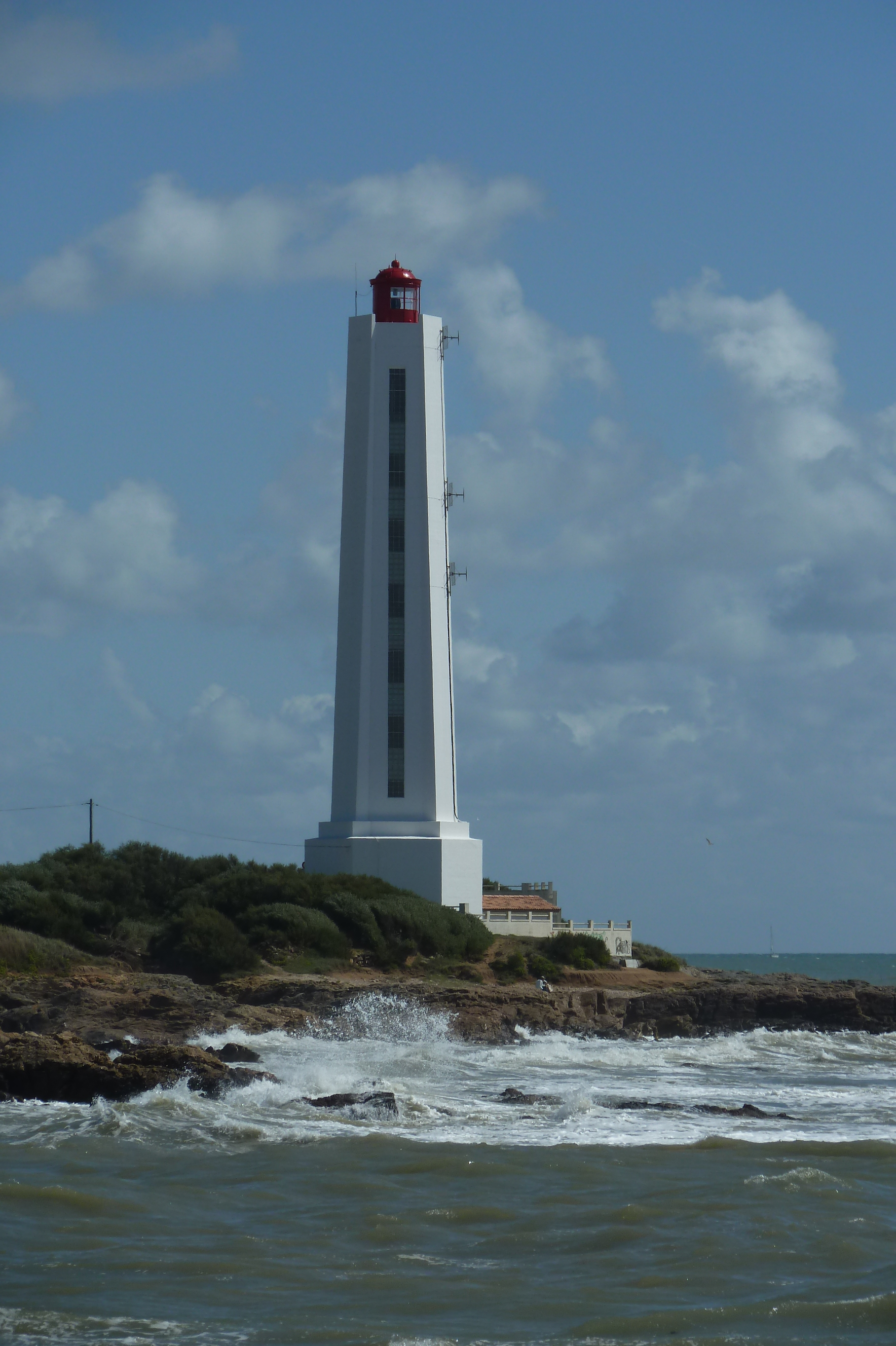
- The lighthouse in 2011
- Location: Les Sables-d'Olonne, Les Sables-d'Olonne, France
- Coordinates: 46°29′23″N 01°48′17″W

Tower
- Constructed: 1968
- Construction: concrete tower
- Automated: 1968
- Height: 38.96 metres (127.8 ft)
- Shape: hexagonal tower with balcony and lantern
- Markings: white tower, red lantern
- Heritage: classified historical monument

Light
- Focal height: 42 metres (138 ft)
- Intensity: 440,000 candela
- Range: 22.5 nautical miles (41.7 km; 25.9 mi)
- Characteristic: Fl (2+1) W 15s.

L'Armendèche Lighthouse is a French lighthouse located along the coast of the Vendée department; it is located in La Chaume, a district of Les Sables-d'Olonne. It was the last major lighthouse to be constructed on French territory, and takes its name from that of a place just down the coast.

The lighthouse was constructed in 1968 to a design by local architect Maurice Durand; unlike his other lighthouses, it was not meant to replace a tower which had been destroyed during World War II, but was instead built new as a landfall light. It was constructed in response to criticisms from local sailors, who said that due to development along the shoreline they could no longer see the harbor lights at the entrance to the town harbor.

The lighthouse is a hexagonal concrete tower, with lantern and gallery, designed in the Art Deco style. It is 38.96 metres (127.8 ft) tall, and is white; the lantern is painted red. The light shows three white flashes in a two-one pattern every fifteen seconds. It was automated at the time of its construction, and is controlled from Les Sables-d'Olonne; it is government property, and may not be visited. It is a listed monument since 2012.

== See also ==
- List of lighthouses in France
