= Pointe des Corbeaux Lighthouse =

Lighthouse in Vendée, France

Pointe des Corbeaux lighthouse
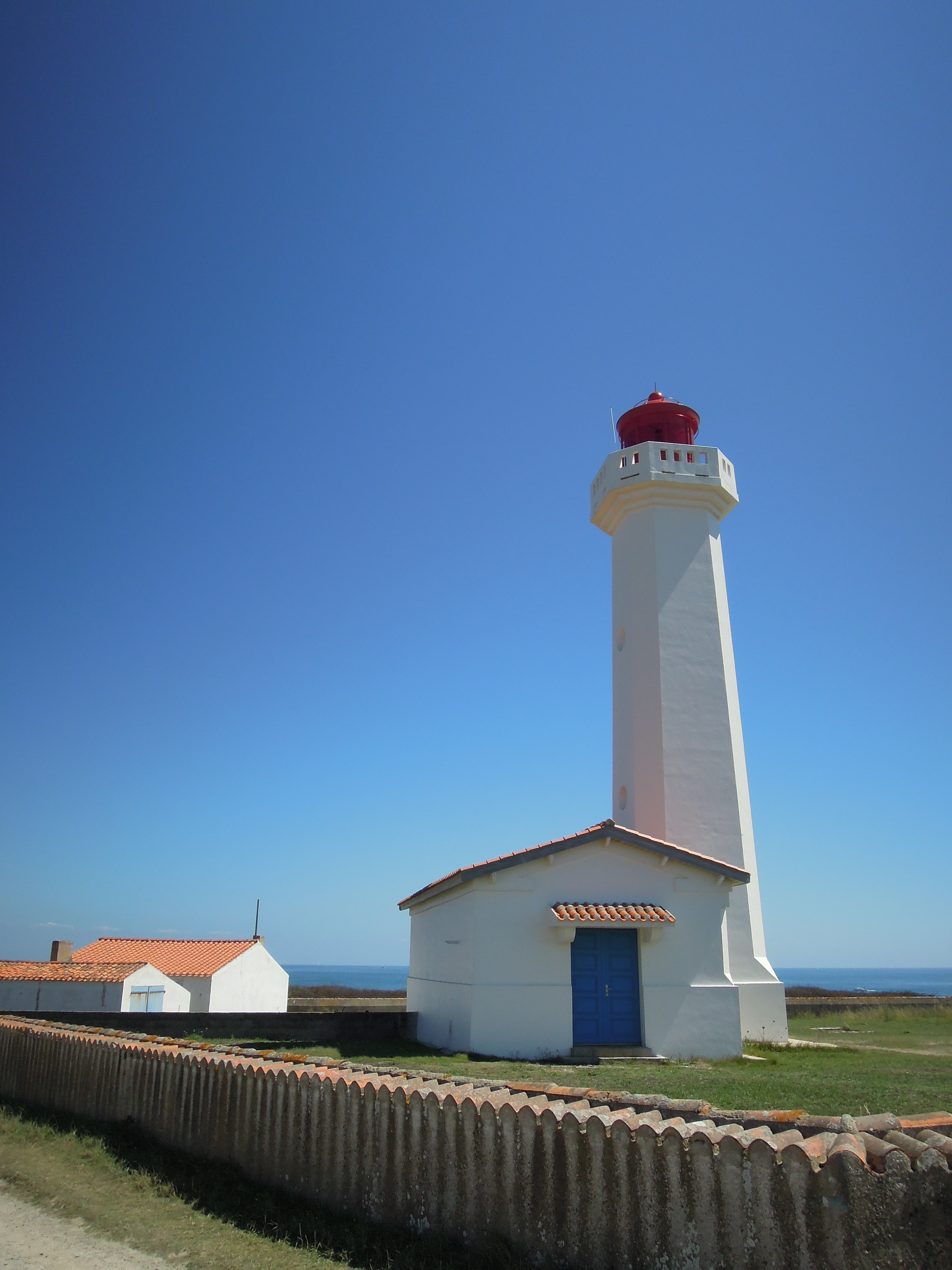
- The lighthouse in 2011
- Location: Île d'Yeu; Vendée; France
- Coordinates: 46°41′25″N 2°17′05″W

Tower
- Constructed: 1862 (first)
- Construction: concrete tower
- Automated: 1990
- Height: 19.2 metres (63 ft) (current); 11.6 metres (38 ft) (first)
- Shape: octagonal tower with balcony and lantern
- Markings: white tower, red lantern
- Heritage: monument historique inscrit

Light
- First lit: 1950 (current)
- Focal height: 25.9 metres (85 ft) (current)
- Range: 18.5 nautical miles (34.3 km; 21.3 mi)
- Characteristic: Fl (3) R 15s.

The Pointe des Corbeaux Lighthouse is a French lighthouse, located on the eponymous point on the Île d'Yeu. Located at the extreme southeastern end of the island, it was constructed in 1950 to replace an earlier tower destroyed during World War II. Along with the Île d'Yeu lighthouse, it is one of two lighthouses on the island to have been designed by Maurice Durand; construction of both was completed in the same year.

== Design ==
The Pointe des Corbeaux Lighthouse is 62 feet tall, and is an octagonal prism concrete structure with lantern and gallery attached to one-storey keeper's dwelling. The tower and gallery are white, while the lantern is red. The lighthouse shows a series of three red flashes, in a two-one pattern, every fifteen seconds. Attached to the tower is a keeper's dwelling, which with several other annexes completes the station.

== History ==
The first lighthouse on the point was lit on 1 September 1862. A small tourelle encased in masonry, it stood 38 feet tall, and was based on plans provided by the state. Its life was very uneventful; it was converted to different sorts of power on numerous occasions, at various times running on vegetable and mineral oil and petrol. This lighthouse lasted until being destroyed by retreating German troops on 25 August 1944. Reconstruction of the tower was completed in 1950 to Durand's design. This lighthouse was automated in 1990, and remains an active aid to navigation; it currently shows a halogen-powered signal.

Today the lighthouse is controlled from the station at the Île d'Yeu lighthouse; it can be seen both from land and from water, but cannot be visited by the public. Another, smaller aid to navigation, a post light attached to a short stone base, is also located on the point.

== See also ==
- List of lighthouses in France
