= Maurice Durand (architect) =

French architect (1884–1978)

- Born: December 6, 1884; Les Sables-d'Olonne, Vendée, France
- Died: February 1978 (aged 93); Les Sables-d'Olonne, Vendée, France
- Occupation: Architect
- Buildings: Île d'Yeu Lighthouse; L'Armendèche Lighthouse

Maurice Durand (December 6, 1884 – February, 1978) was a French architect. He was active in the Vendée department, primarily in the area around Les Sables-d'Olonne, and many of his buildings may still be seen in that area today.

Durand was born in Les Sables d'Olonne, and began his career there in 1913, when he designed a number of buildings in town, including the Villa Mirasol and the Villa Blanche. He was accepted into the architectural academy in Paris in 1920; the following year he was named city architect in his hometown. In 1930 he was made the Architect of Historic Monuments for the Vendée department. He was awarded the Légion d’Honneur in 1935, and became departmental architect in 1937.

Before World War II, Durand was active in designing buildings around Les Sables d'Olonne; among the most notable were the Rudelière casino, the church of Saint Peter, the "Notre-Dame de France" clinic, and a number of hotels. Some of his most important civic work was done after the war, in the aftermath of the Invasion of Normandy. German troops had destroyed many navigational aids along the French coast as part of their retreat in 1944, and many lighthouses had to be reconstructed in the decade after the war. Durand was charged with designing three:

- Île d'Yeu Lighthouse, completed in 1950
- Pointe des Corbeaux Lighthouse, completed in 1950
- Pointe du Grouin du Cou Lighthouse, completed in 1958

In addition, Durand was responsible for the design of L'Armendèche Lighthouse, completed in 1968 as a landfall light for Les Sables d'Olonne. The four were built in an Art Deco style; notably, each tower was designed as a unique building, different from the others in the series.

Durand was active throughout the 1950s and 1960s, continuing to design buildings for his hometown. He oversaw the renovation of the City Hall, the Grand Casino, the place du Tribunal, and the Caisse d’Épargne, and participated in the restoration of the Abbey of Sainte-Croix. At the start of the 1970s, he was involved in one more restoration project, the work on the church of Saint Nicholas in La Chaume.

Durand died in Les Sables-d’Olonne in February 1978. Today a pavilion in the town is named in his memory.
