= Île Vierge =

Islet in France

Aerial view of Île Vierge

Île Vierge (Breton language: Enez-Werc'h) is a 6-hectare (15-acre) islet lying 1.5 kilometres (3/4 nautical mile) off the north-west coast of Brittany, opposite the village of Lilia. It is in the commune of Plouguerneau, in the département of Finistère. It is the location of the tallest stone lighthouse in Europe, and the tallest "traditional lighthouse" in the world. The International Hydrographic Organization specifies Île Vierge as marking the south-western limit of the English Channel.

== History ==
About 1450, the Conventual Franciscans established an abbey on the island. The name "Île Vierge" probably comes from a chapel dedicated to the Blessed Virgin Mary. In 1507, the monks moved to Aber Wrac'h on the mainland. In 1844, the French state purchased the island from sieur Goyon de Coëpel for 6,000 francs.

== The lighthouses ==
Île Vierge lighthouse
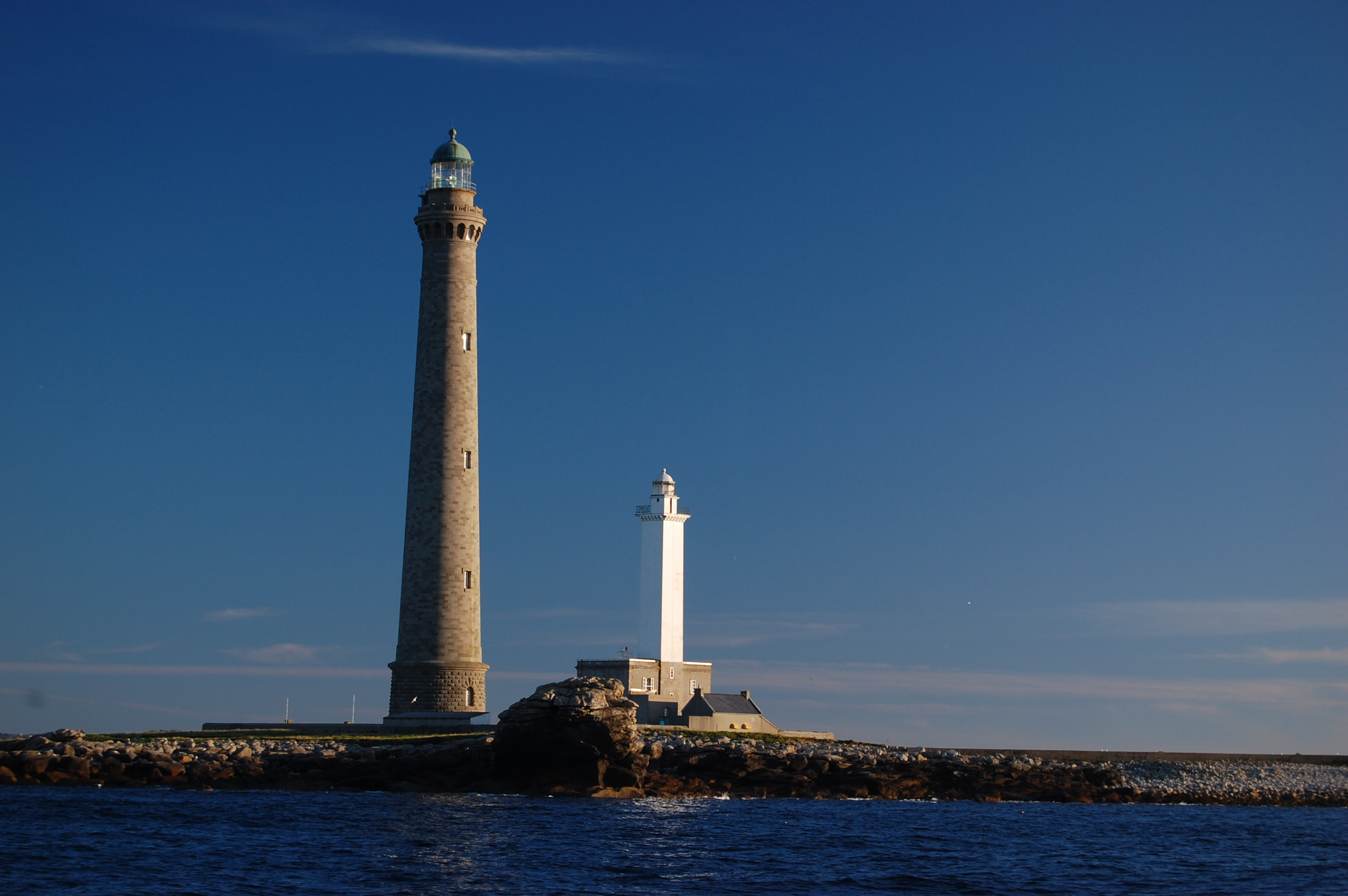
- Location: Île Vierge, Finistère; France
- Coordinates: 48.638888°N 4.567493°W

Tower
- Constructed: 1845 (first)
- Construction: stone tower (first) granite tower (current)
- Automated: 2010, 2002
- Height: 31 m (102 ft) (first); 82.5 m (271 ft) (current)
- Shape: square tower with balcony and lantern (first) tapered cylindrical tower with balcony and lantern (current)
- Markings: white tower and lantern (first) unpainted tower, green lantern dome (current)
- Heritage: classified historical monument

Light
- First lit: 1902 (current)
- Focal height: 77 m (253 ft) (current)
- Lens: 4 Fresnel lenses
- Range: 50 km (27 nmi)
- Characteristic: Fl W 5s.

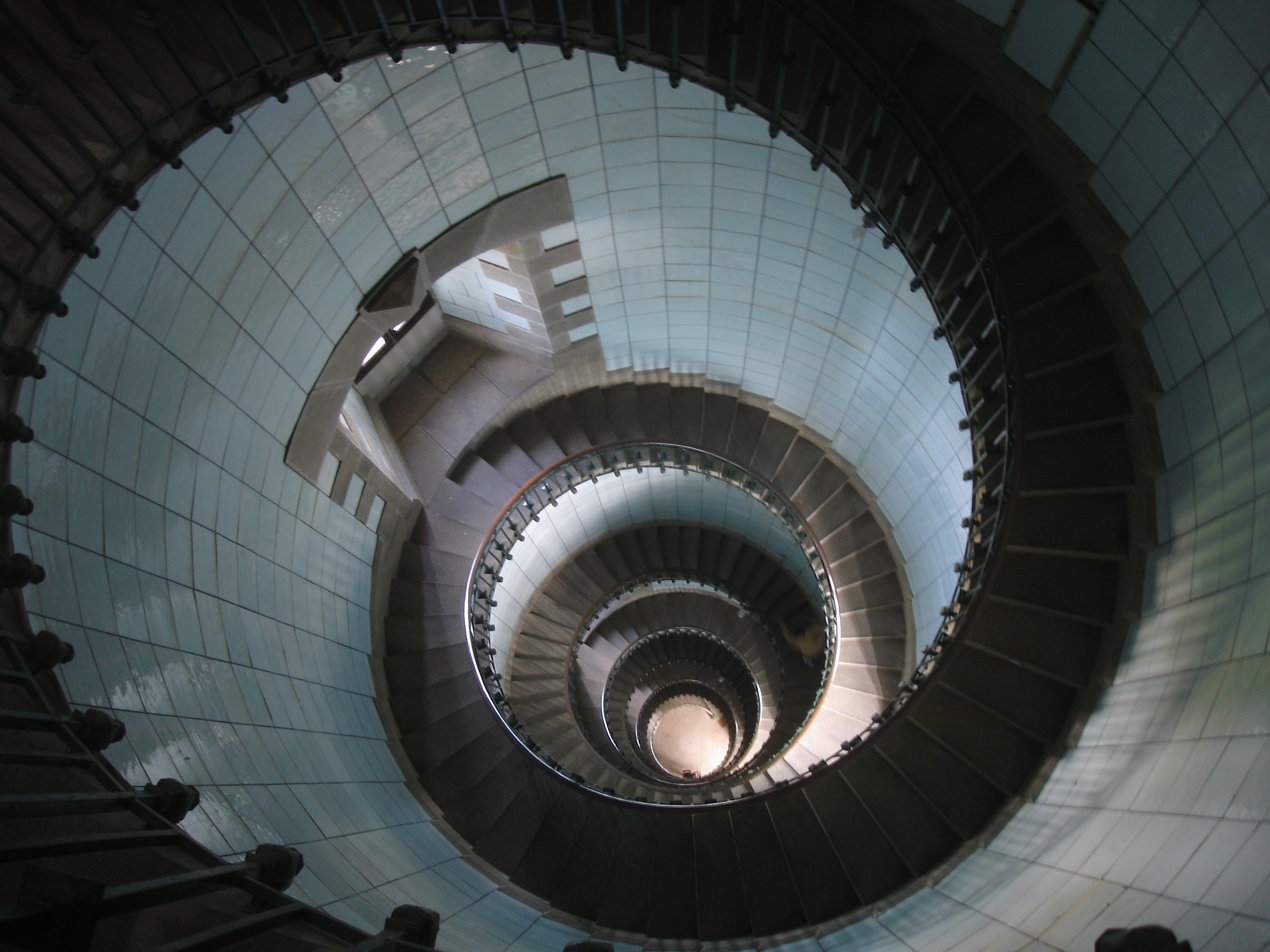
Inner staircase

The first lighthouse is a square tower 33 metres (108 ft) high, constructed in 1842–45. It started operation on 15 August 1845, feast day of the Assumption of the Virgin. It had a fixed white light visible for 14 nautical miles (26 kilometres). It remained in use while the second lighthouse was under construction in 1896–1902. A foghorn was installed in 1952, replaced in 1993 by a radio beacon.

The newer lighthouse is 82.5 metres (271 ft) tall, made of blocks of granite. The external face is a truncated cone; the interior face is cylindrical, lined with 12,500 opaline glass tiles made by Saint-Gobain. There are five steps to the front door; inside, 360 steps of stone and 32 of iron lead to the lamp platform. The electric lamp was installed in 1952 on the original mechanical turning plate, sitting in a bath of mercury. The plate was replaced with an electric motor in 1983. The lamp has four lenses with a focal length of 0.5m. The twin beam gives a white flash every 5 seconds, visible for 27 nmi (50 km). Electrical generators were installed in 1959, supplemented in 1967–1994 by two wind turbines. The light and rotation are activated automatically by a photoelectric sensor. Although the lighthouse is automated, the site is still staffed.

The island is open to the public from April to September, as is the lighthouse, by appointment. The number of visitors was 5,944 in 2003, 5,974 in 2004, and 7,371 in 2005. Both lighthouses have been a listed monument since 2011.

== See also ==
- List of lighthouses in France
- List of tallest lighthouses in the world
