= Pointe du Grouin du Cou Lighthouse =

Lighthouse in Vendée, France

Pointe du Grouin du Cou lighthouse
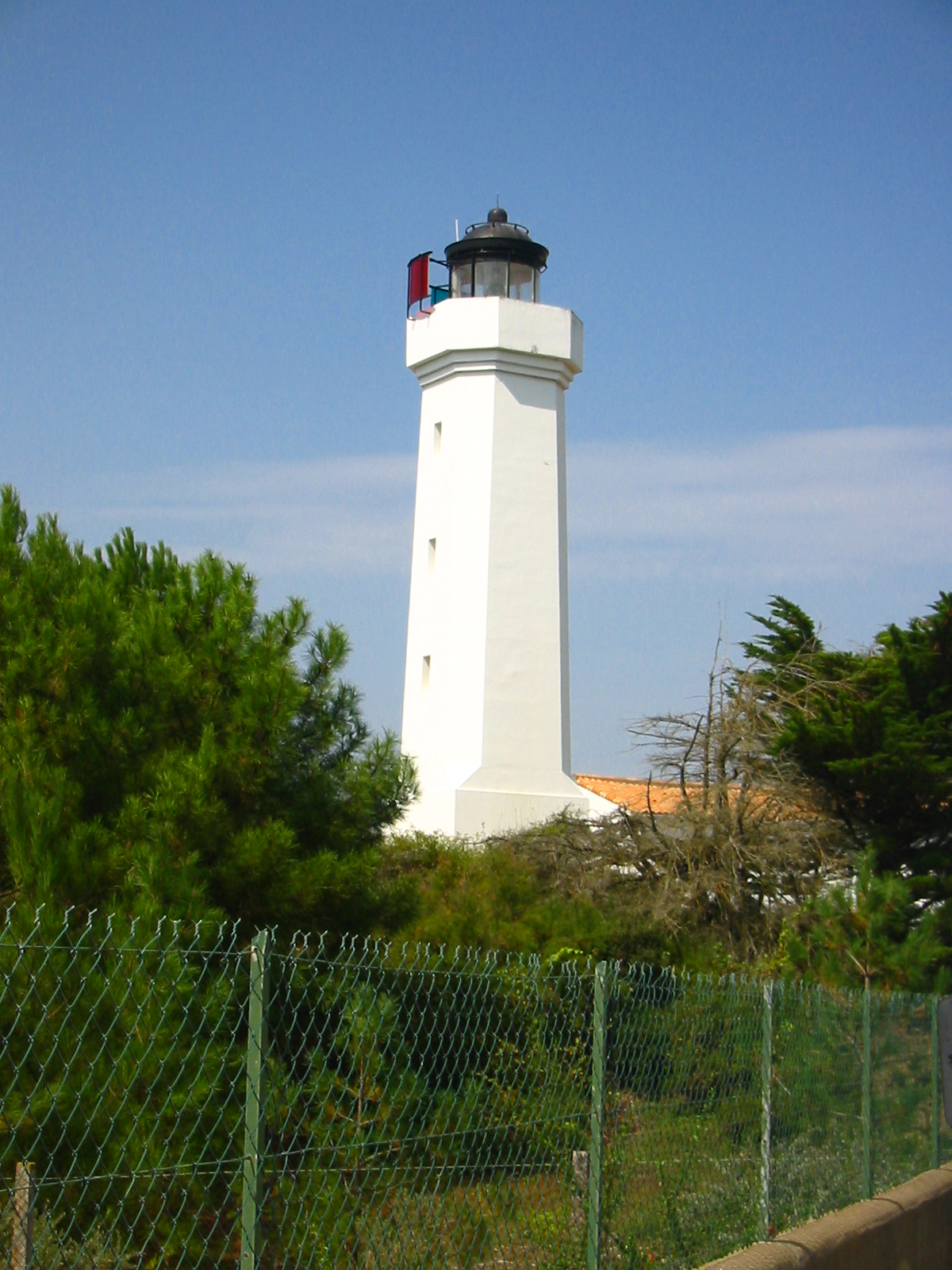
- The lighthouse in 2007
- Location: Pointe du Grouin du Cou; Bay of Biscay; France
- Coordinates: 46°20′40″N 1°27′49″W

Tower
- Constructed: 1831 (first); 1867 (second)
- Construction: concrete tower
- Height: 16.33 metres (53.6 ft) (current); 9 metres (30 ft) (first); 14 metres (46 ft) (second)
- Shape: octagonal tower with balcony and lantern
- Markings: white tower, black lantern
- Heritage: listed in the general inventory of cultural heritage

Light
- First lit: 1953 (current)
- Focal height: 30 metres (98 ft) (current); 18 metres (59 ft) (first); 28 metres (92 ft) (second)
- Light source: Halogen lamp
- Characteristic: Fl WRG 5s (depending on direction)

The Pointe du Grouin du Cou Lighthouse (sometimes called the La Tranche-sur-Mer Lighthouse) is a French lighthouse, located on the eponymous point in the southern part of the Vendée department; it guards the entrance to the Pertuis Breton on the Île de Ré, on the west side of La Tranche-sur-Mer. The lighthouse, constructed in 1953 to a design by Maurice Durand, replaces an earlier tower that was destroyed by retreating German troops during World War II.

== Description ==
The lighthouse at Pointe du Grouin du Cou is a 52-foot-tall (16 m) Art Deco tower built in concrete; it is octagonal, and has a lantern and gallery as well. The tower is white, while the lantern is painted black. Its focal plane is 95 feet (29 m) above sea level, and it shows a flash of light every five seconds; depending on the direction, the light shown is either white, red, or green. The signal is currently halogen powered.

== History ==
The first lighthouse on the site was lit on 1 July 1831; it was a small cylindrical tourelle encased in masonry, and showed a fixed white light. A short tower, it stood only 27 feet (8.2 m) tall, and was intended to warn ships' captains off of the treacherous limestone rocks that could be found in the area. A taller light, 46 feet (14 m) tall, was installed in May 1867, and also showed a fixed white light. This was changed in 1893 to a light which flashed every five seconds, and which showed white and red sectors. In 1906 the signal was converted to a mercury-vapor lamp, and in 1931 it received a supplementary green sector. The lighthouse was powered by various means at various points in its career, notably vegetable oil (1831), mineral oil (around 1875), gas (1906) and finally electricity (1953).

The lighthouse at the point was completely demolished on the night of 24 July 1944 by German soldiers. A temporary wooden pylon was erected soon after, being lit on 10 October of the following year; the old lighthouse was not permanently replaced, however, until 1953. On 25 April of that year the new tower showed its light, an electric signal, for the first time; it was tended by a keeper until 1985, when it was automated. Today the lighthouse is controlled automatically from Les Sables-d'Olonne; its property is still owned by the government, and is off-limits to visitors.

== See also ==
- List of lighthouses in France
