= Villa Blanche =

Historic townhouse in Vendée, France

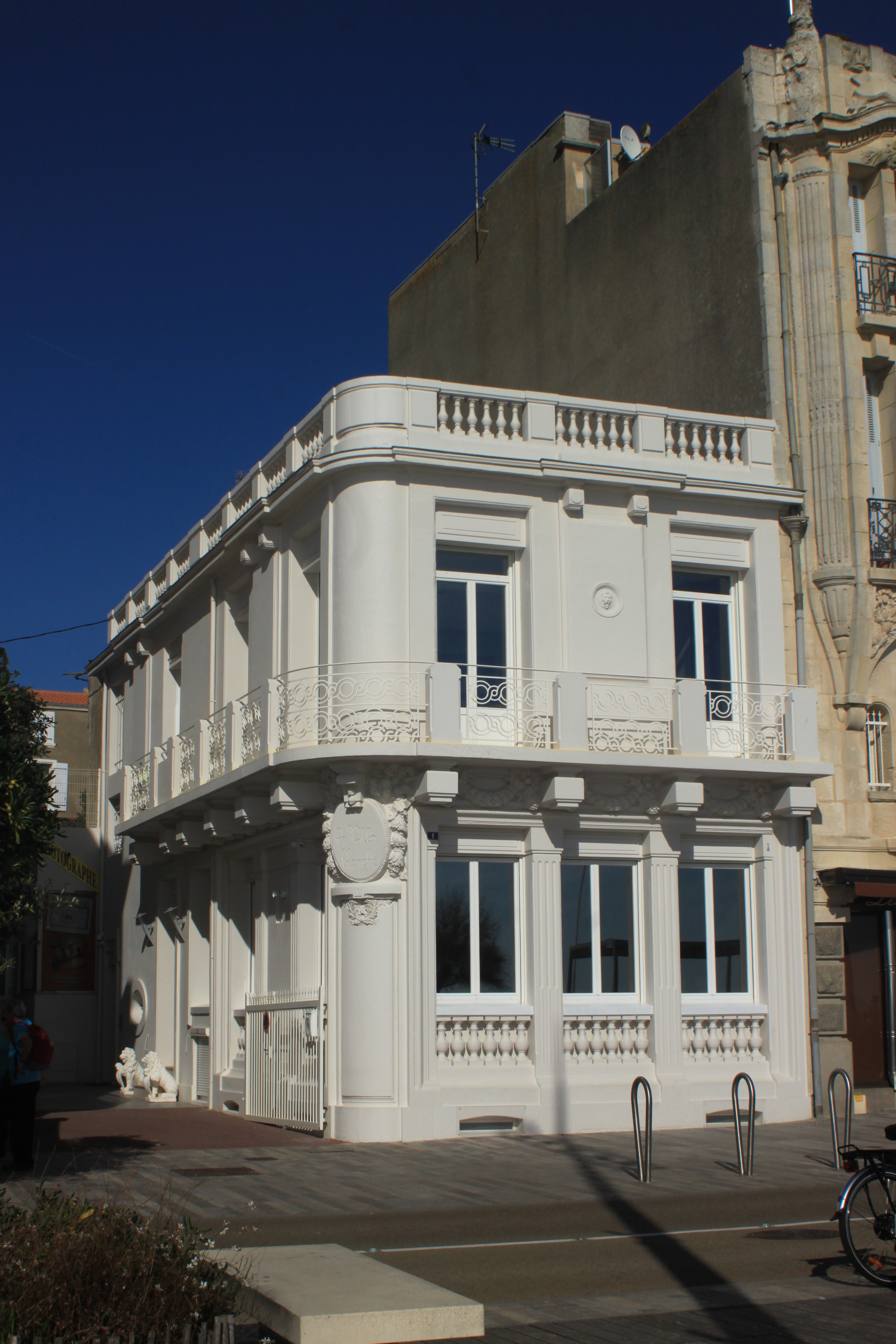
- Interactive map of the Villa Blanche area

General information
- Type: House
- Location: 1 promenade Amiral Lafargue, Les Sables-d'Olonne, France
- Coordinates: 46°29′42″N 1°47′04″W
- Completed: 1913

Design and construction
- Architect: Maurice Durand

The Villa Blanche is a historic townhouse in Les Sables-d'Olonne, Vendée, France. It was built in 1913, and designed by architect Maurice Durand. It was a tearoom until 1914, when it was used by an estate agent named Fraud. It became a private residence in 1925.
