= Le Four Lighthouse =

French lighthouse

Coordinates: 48°31′23″N 4°48′18″W

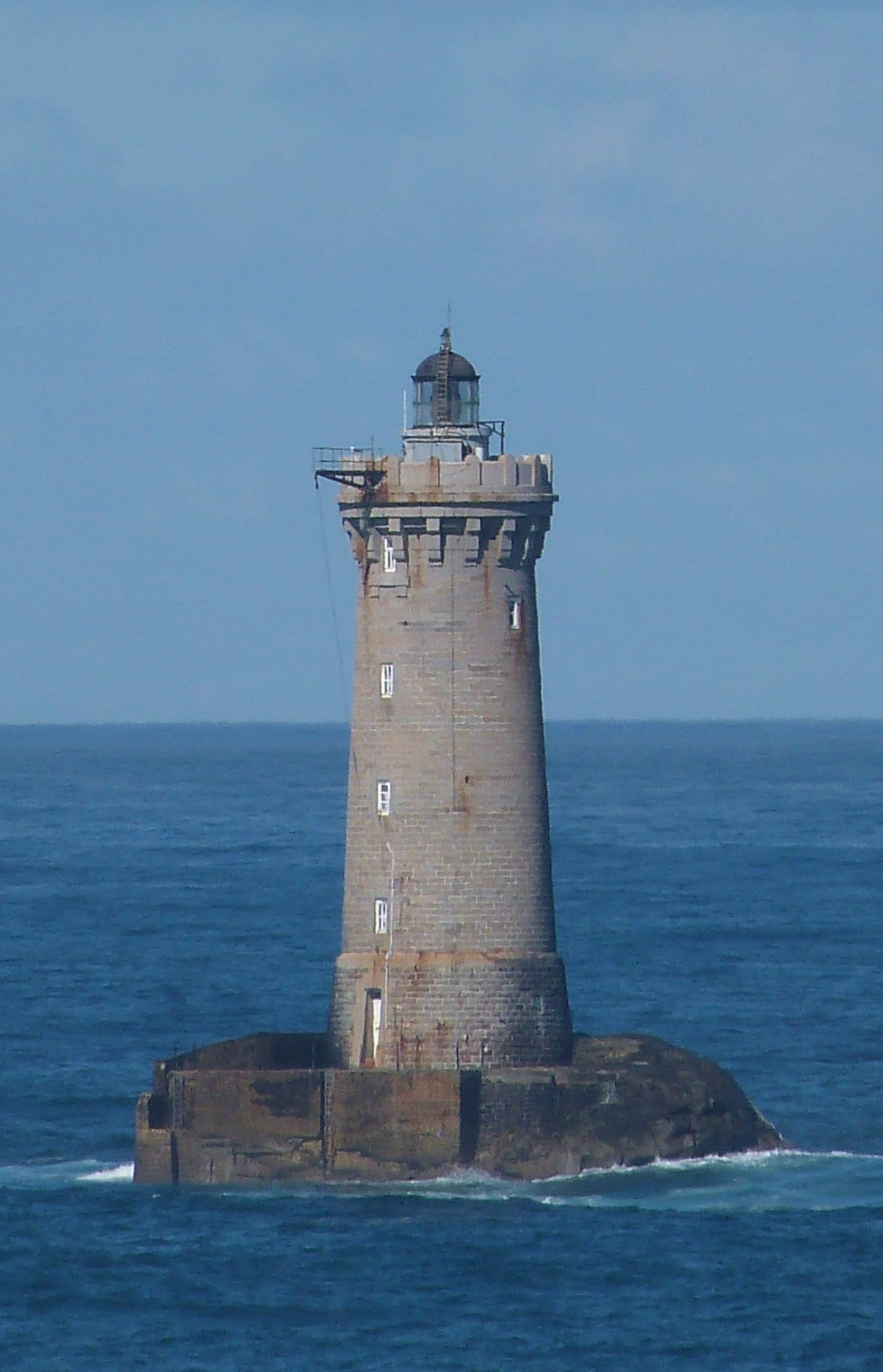
Le Four Lighthouse in 2015

The Le Four Lighthouse is a lighthouse located off the Saint-Laurent peninsula in France, between the west coast of the Pays de Léon and the Roches d'Argenton, in the municipality of Porspoder.

== History ==
On October 9, 1862, the position of the Four rock was recognized as interesting to build a lighthouse by the Nautical Commission. On December 8 of the same year, it was classified in the 3rd category (out of 5) and its orientation was defined Southeast/North West with the place in the South East. Construction, under the authority of engineers Blanchat, Léonce Raynaud and Fenoux, began in April 1869, and was significantly impeded by waves breaking over the rock. After six months, construction was suspended for the winter; the construction campaign of 1870 began with repairing the damage caused by winter storms.

During construction, three people- Hervé Jézéquel, François Leborgne, and foreman Le Brelivet, were killed when their supply ship struck a rock and sank. On the night of March 14 to 15, 1874, the lighthouse entered service.

On February 14, 1899, the lighthouse was struck by lightning.

Two other accidents mark its history. A keeper died on February 13, 1913, having breathed gas oil fumes. On December 9, 1978, a supply ship capsized near lighthouse, causing the drowning of Martin Perreaux and Jean-Yves Kernoas. In 1985, the compressed-air fog signal was replaced with a 1200-watt electromagnetic system. The lighthouse was automated on October 6, 1993.
