= Kéréon Lighthouse =

Coordinates: 48°26′15″N 5°01′33″W

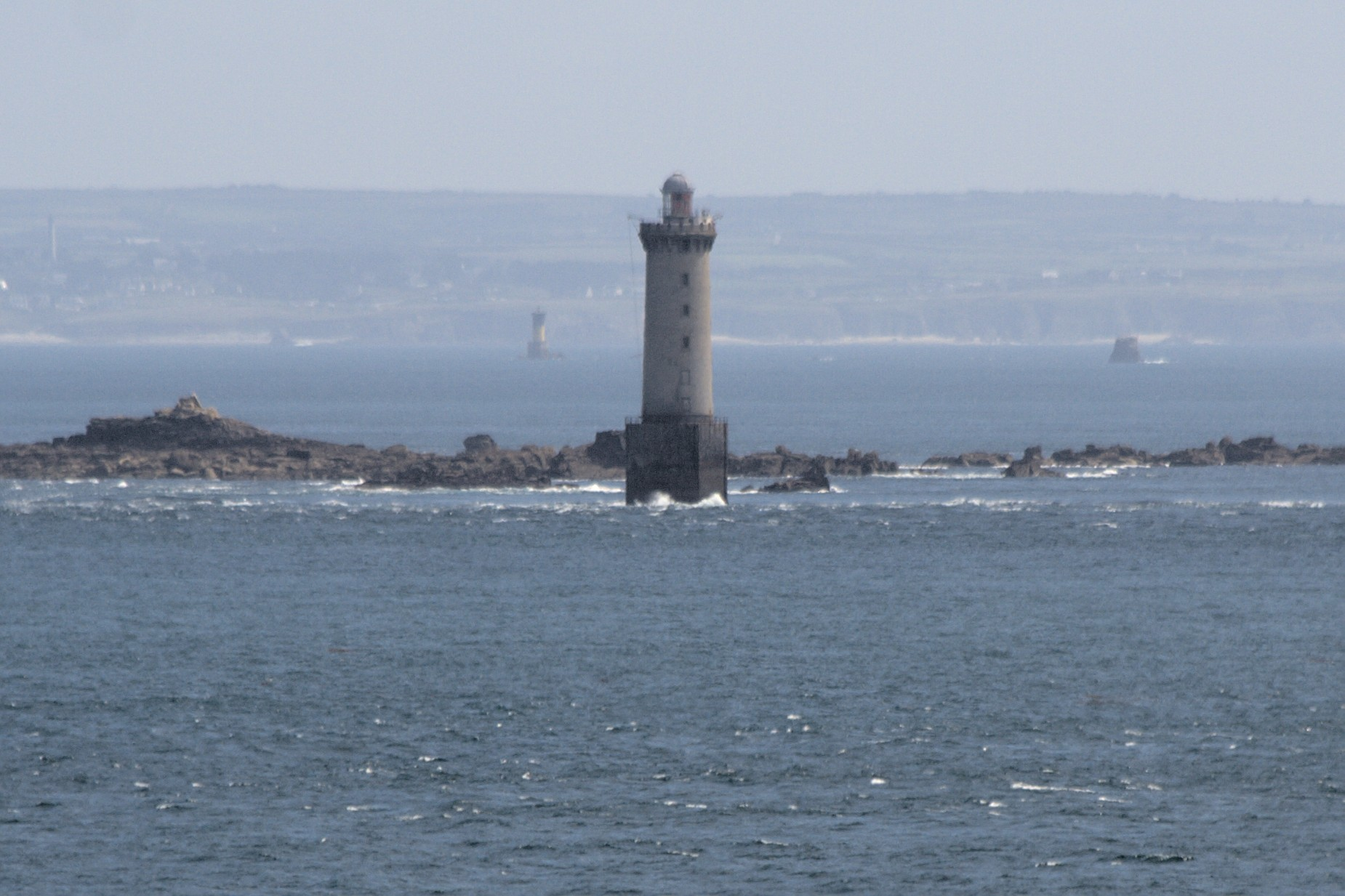
Kéréon lighthouse with Ushant Island in the background

The Kéréon Lighthouse (French: Phare de Kéréon) is a French lighthouse on the reef of Men Tensel between Ushant and Molène in the Fromveur Passage in the Iroise Sea, Brittany.

== History ==
Built from 1907 to 1916, it was financed in part by a donation of 585,000 francs from Amicie Lebaudy (compared to a total construction cost of 941,000 francs). It was named after her great-uncle, Charles-Marie Le Dall de Kéréon, a naval officer guillotined under the Terror. This donation also made it possible to make it the last phare-monument ("lighthouse-monument"): its interior is luxurious, with mosaic in the stairwell, oak parquet decorated with a wind rose inlaid in mahogany and ebony, as well as Hungarian oak panelling.

The lighthouse was commissioned in 1916, and was electrified in 1972. From this period, the light was controlled via photocell and powered by two generator sets and a wind turbine, but the keepers remained responsible for ensuring its proper functioning and maintaining it.

It was the last "hell" (i.e., a lighthouse isolated in the open sea) to be automated, on January 29, 2004, via remote control from the Créac'h Lighthouse. Since then, its inlaid floors and panelling are no longer maintained by the keepers, but it remains heated and dehumidified between maintenance visits that take place in good weather.
