= Pontusval Lighthouse =

Lighthouse in Brignogan-Plages, France

Pontusval Lighthouse Phare de Pontusval
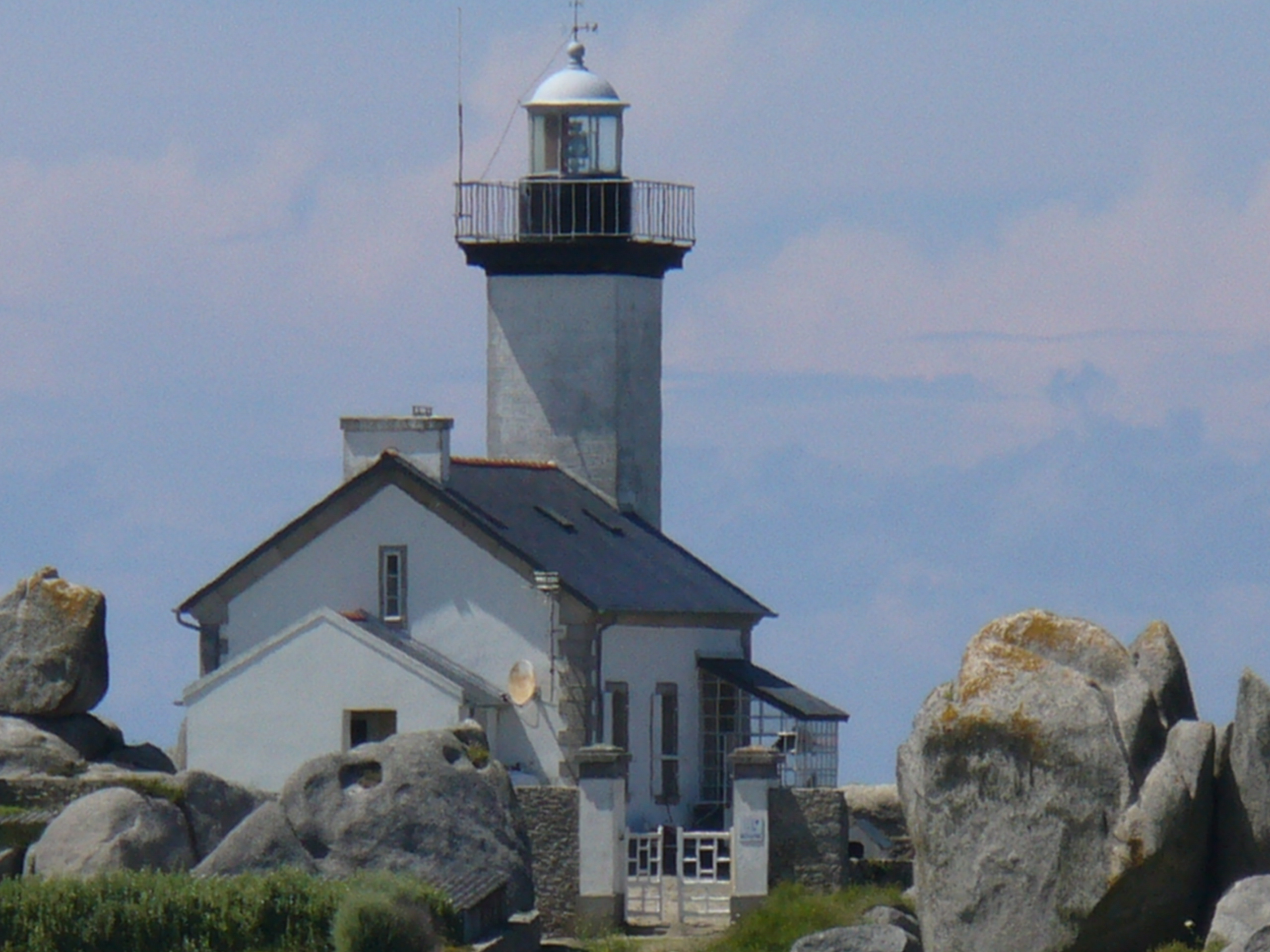
- Location: Brignogan-Plages, Finistère, France
- Coordinates: 48.677938°N 4.346478°W

Tower
- Constructed: 1869
- Construction: 1865-1869
- Automated: 2003
- Height: 14.5 m (48 ft)
- Heritage: classified historical monument

Light
- Focal height: 16 m (52 ft)
- Range: 10 nmi (19 km; 12 mi) (white), 7 nmi (13 km; 8.1 mi) (red)
- Characteristic: Oc(3) WR 12s

The Pontusval Lighthouse (French: Phare de Pontusval) is erected on the tip of Beg-Pol, in the commune of Brignogan-Plages in France.

It is marked at night by three occultations every twelve seconds. Fifty-two steps lead to the summit. It lost its last caretaker, Marie-Paule Le Guen, in 2003. However, she continued to live in the house until her death in November 2023.

The lighthouse, of the square turret type centered on the gable end (excluding the kitchen, veranda and garage), has been listed as a monument historique since 23 May 2011.

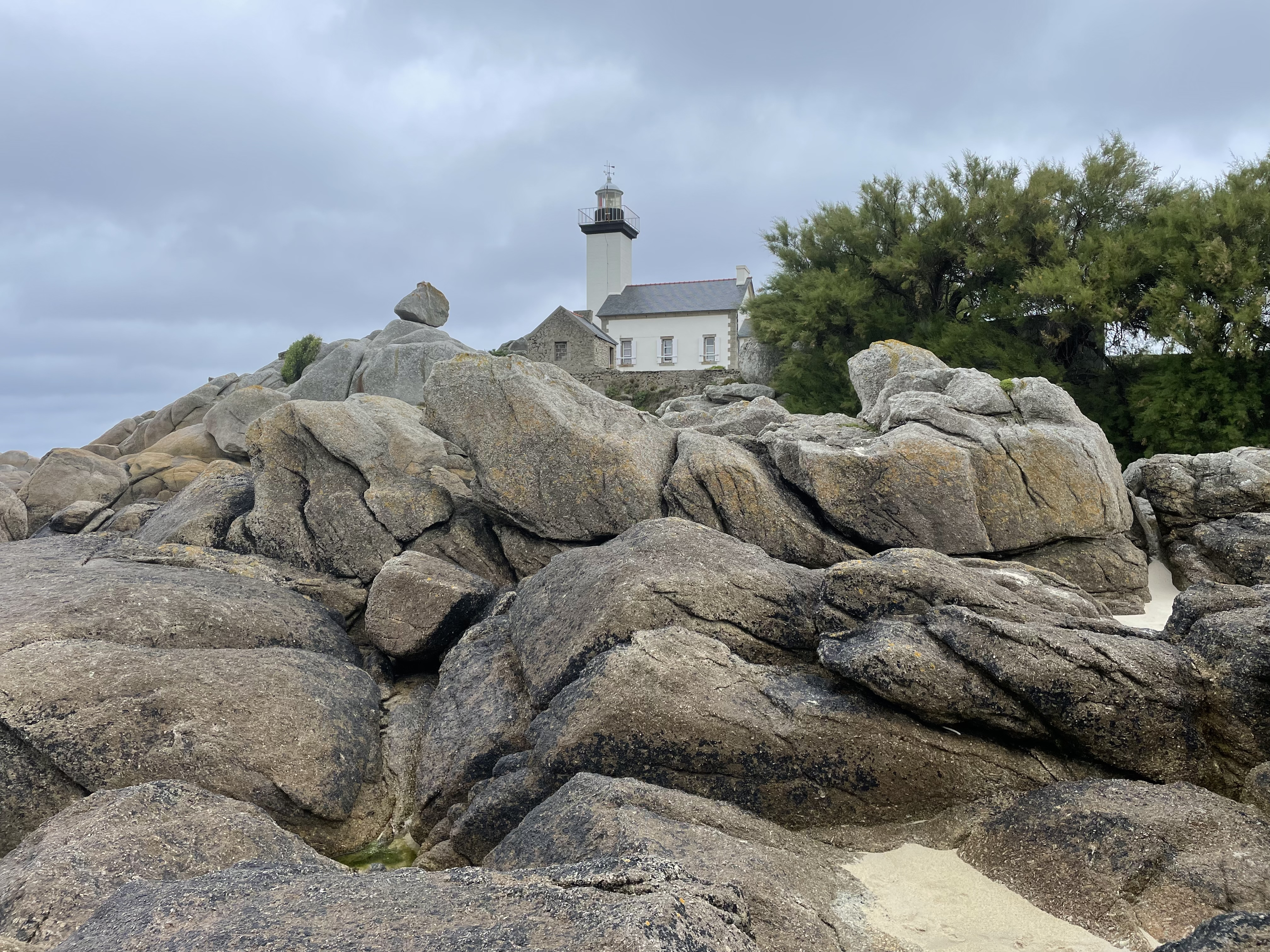
The lighthouse
