= List of lighthouses in New Caledonia =

This is a list of lighthouses in New Caledonia.

== Lighthouses ==
Name	Image	Year built	Location & coordinates	Class of light	Focal height	NGA number	Admiralty number	Range nml
Amédée Lighthouse		1865	Nouméa; 22°28′38.39″S 166°28′4.63″E	Fl (2) W 15s.	53 metres (174 ft)	3644	K4802.1	20
Bonne Anse Lighthouse	Image	n/a	Grande Terre; 2°23′49.8″S 166°52′59.3″E	Iso WG 4s.	11 metres (36 ft)	3624	K4799	white: 8 green: 6
Canal Woodin North Side Lighthouse	Image	n/a	Prony Bay; 22°22′58.1″S 166°47′53.1″E	Iso WG 4s.	12 metres (39 ft)	3632	K4799.5	white: 8 green: 5
Cap N'Doua Lighthouse		n/a	Grande Terre; 22°23′18.3″S 166°55′48.3″E	Fl (4) W 15s.	55 metres (180 ft)	3612	K4794	16
Cap N'Doua Range Middle Lighthouse		1932	Grande Terre; 22°23′22.8″S 166°55′40.5″E	Fl (4) W 15s.	114 metres (374 ft)	3616	K4794.1	16
Cap N'Doua Range Rear Lighthouse	Image	1932	Grande Terre; 22°23′27.2″S 166°55′28.9″E	Fl (4) W 15s.	189 metres (620 ft)	3620	K4794.2	14
Île Lifou Lighthouse		n/a	Loyalty Islands; 21°03′32.5″S 167°27′22.6″E	Fl (2+1) W 15s.	90 metres (300 ft)	3584	K4834	15
Île Ouen Lighthouse		n/a	Grande Terre; 22°23′38.2″S 166°49′04.0″E	Fl WR 2.5s.	64 metres (210 ft)	3628	K4799.6	white: 9 red: 6
Îlot Maître Lighthouse		n/a	Nouméa; 22°20′39.1″S 166°25′30.1″E	Q R	10 metres (33 ft)	3652	K4800.5	5
Îlot Nou Range Rear Lighthouse	Image	n/a	Nouméa; 22°16′09.1″S 166°24′57.1″E	Fl (4) W 15s.	71 metres (233 ft)	3660	K4812.1	12
Îlot Porc-Épic Lighthouse	Image	n/a	Nouméa; 22°19′35.4″S 166°34′11.1″E	Fl (3) WG 12s.	36 metres (118 ft)	3636	K4800	white: 11 green: 8
Îlot Signal Lighthouse	Image	1883	Nouméa; 22°17′53.1″S 166°17′30.6″E	day beacon	10 metres (33 ft)	n/a	n/a	n/a
Passe de Boulari Range Front Lighthouse		1881	Nouméa; 22°28′43.7″S 166°27′58.3″E	Dir Iso W 6s.	6 metres (20 ft)	3640	K4802	11
Passe de Goro Lighthouse	Image	~1950s	Grande Terre; 22°19′39.2″S 167°02′15.6″E	Fl W 4s.	25 metres (82 ft)	3604	K4795	11
Petit Pass Range Front Lighthouse (Cathedral)		1970s	Nouméa; 22°16′22.8″S 166°26′40.0″E	Q W	46 metres (151 ft)	3676	K4816	15
Puareti Lighthouse		n/a	Grande Terre; 22°05′48.4″S 166°55′47.2″E	Fl (4) W 15s.	90 metres (300 ft)	3600	K4790	24
Recif Ioro Lighthouse	Image	n/a	Grande Terre; 22°23′01.7″S 166°57′36.8″E	Iso R 4s.	7 metres (23 ft)	3608	K4797	5
Récif Tabou Lighthouse	Image	n/a	Nouméa; 22°28′53.0″S 166°26′57.2″E	Oc (4) WR 12s.	13 metres (43 ft)	3648	K4804	white: 10 red: 7

== See also ==
- Lists of lighthouses and lightvessels
