= Penfret Lighthouse =

Lighthouse in the Glénan Islands, France

Penfret Lighthouse Phare de Penfret
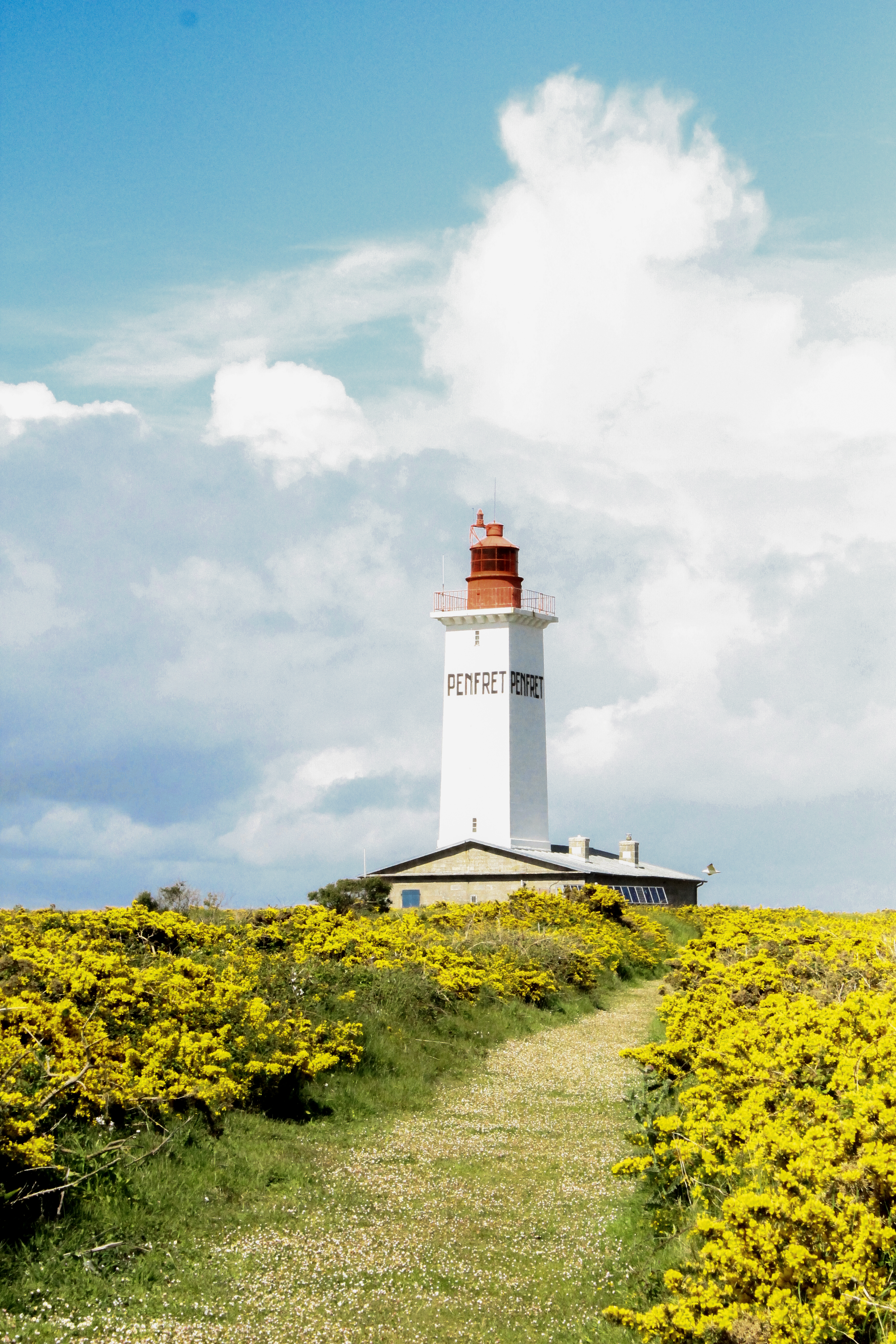
- Location: Glénan Islands, Fouesnant, Finistère, France
- Coordinates: 47.721083°N 3.952950°W

Tower
- Constructed: 1837
- Construction: 1836-1838
- Automated: 1993
- Height: 24.25 m (79.6 ft), 24.2 m (79 ft)
- Heritage: monument historique inscrit

Light
- First lit: 10 October 1837
- Focal height: 36 m (118 ft) (red), 34 m (112 ft) (white)
- Range: 21 nmi (39 km; 24 mi) (red), 11 nmi (20 km; 13 mi) (white)
- Characteristic: Fl R 5s, Q W

The Penfret Lighthouse (French: Phare de Penfret; breton: tour-tan Penfred) is located at the northeastern tip of the island of the same name, which is located at the eastern tip of the Glénan Islands, in the commune of Fouesnant in the department of Finistère in France.

== History ==
The lighthouse was lit on 1 October 1838.

In 1898, the lighthouse was the first to be equipped with a "petroleum vapor incandescent burner" which increased the light's luminous power.

== Heritage ==
It was listed as a monument historique on 31 December 2015.
