= La Chaume =

- Commune
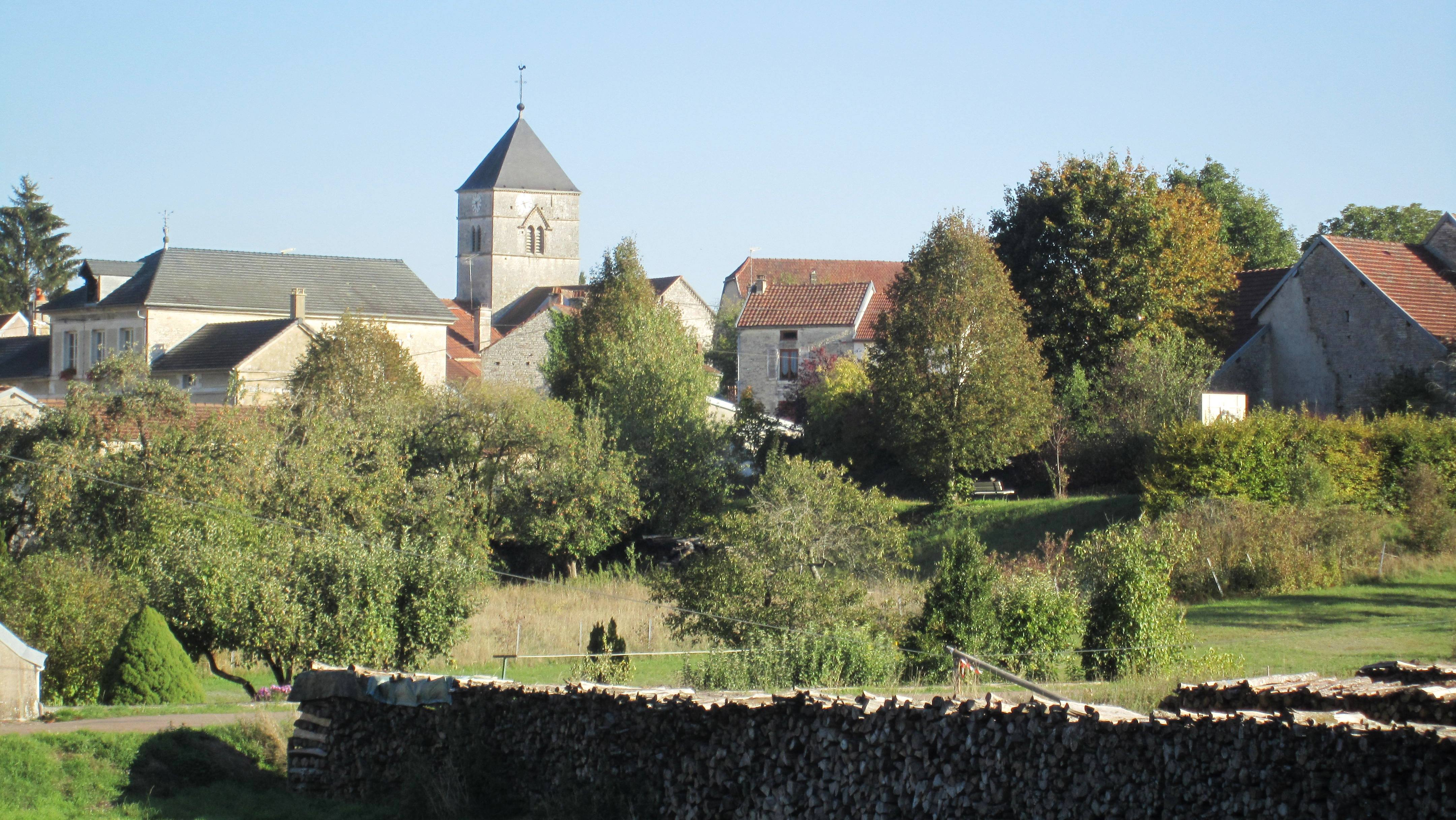
- A general view of La Chaume
- Location of La Chaume
- Location within France Location within Bourgogne-Franche-Comté
- Coordinates: 47°52′47″N 4°50′24″E
- Country: France
- Region: Bourgogne-Franche-Comté
- Department: Côte-d'Or
- Arrondissement: Montbard
- Canton: Châtillon-sur-Seine
- Intercommunality: Pays Châtillonnais

Government
  - Mayor (2020–2026): Bruno Manzoni
- Area^{1}: 33.1 km^{2} (12.8 sq mi)
- Elevation: 290 m (950 ft)
- Highest elevation: 376 m (1,234 ft)
- Lowest elevation: 257 m (843 ft)
- Population (2023): 97
  - Density: 2.9/km^{2} (7.6/sq mi)
- Time zone: UTC+01:00 (CET)
  - Summer (DST): UTC+02:00 (CEST)
- INSEE/Postal code: 21159 /21520
- ^{1} French Land Register data, which excludes lakes, ponds, glaciers > 1 km^{2} (0.386 sq mi or 247 acres) and river estuaries.

La Chaume (French pronunciation: [la ʃom]) is a commune in the Côte-d'Or department in eastern France.

== Population ==
Historical population
Year	Pop.	±% p.a.
1968	135	—
1975	140	+0.52%
1982	132	−0.84%
1990	135	+0.28%
1999	136	+0.08%
2007	126	−0.95%
2012	114	−1.98%
2017	102	−2.20%
2023	97	−0.83%
Source: INSEE

== See also ==
- Communes of the Côte-d'Or department
