= Jean Guichard =

French photographer

Jean Guichard (French pronunciation: [ʒɑ̃ ɡiʃaʁ]), born in Paris, on April 28, 1952, is a French photographer known for his images of lighthouses. One series of seven pictures, titled La Jument, is world-famous; taken in 1989, it depicts the French lighthouse "La Jument" in a tempest. In the photograph, a wave is about to engulf the lighthouse as its keeper, thinking Guichard's was the rescue helicopter, looks out the open door.
