= La Jument =

Lighthouse in Finistère, France

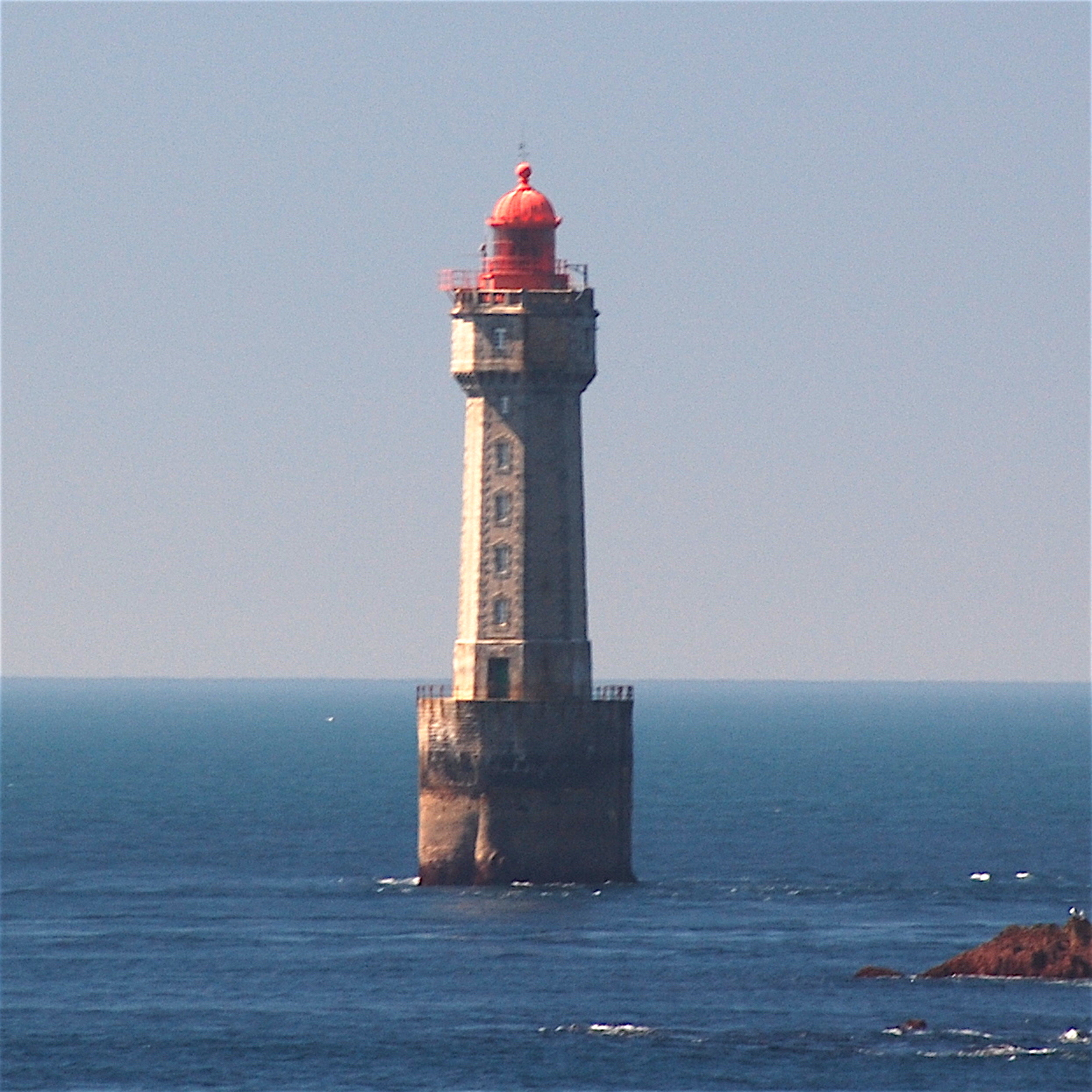
- La Jument in 2007
- Location: Ushant, France (offshore)
- Coordinates: 48°25′0″N 5°7′59″W

Tower
- Constructed: 1911
- Foundation: concrete base
- Construction: stone tower
- Automated: 1991
- Height: 48 metres (157 ft)
- Shape: octagonal tower with balcony and lantern
- Markings: unpainted tower, red lantern and balcony
- Power source: solar power
- Heritage: classified historical monument

Light
- First lit: 1911
- Focal height: 36 metres (118 ft)
- Lens: Fresnel
- Range: 22 nautical miles (41 km; 25 mi)
- Characteristic: 3 Fl R 15s 1990 electrification

La Jument ("the mare"; Breton: Ar Gazeg) is a lighthouse in Brittany, Northwestern France. The lighthouse is built on a rock (that is also called La Jument) about 300 metres from the coast of the island of Ushant. It was listed as a historic monument in 2017. It has been called Brittany's most famous lighthouse, largely because of photography by Jean Guichard.

== History ==
This section of the coastline of Brittany, the west coast of Northern France, had always been known by sailors to be a rugged and dangerous area. Being the westernmost point of land, it is a heavily trafficked sealane, and also experiences severe weather during much of the year. As a result, the area has experienced many shipwrecks over the centuries: for example, just between 1888 and 1904, 31 ships were wrecked there.

Plans to build a lighthouse on La Jument started not long after the wreck of the Glasgow-built steam ship SS Drummond Castle in June 1896, which had resulted in the deaths of around 250 people. The building works were privately financed by a wealthy Frenchman who had almost died in another shipwreck. Construction began in 1904, but the lighthouse could not be finished until 1911 because of the sea's often challenging conditions.

== Guichard's photographs ==
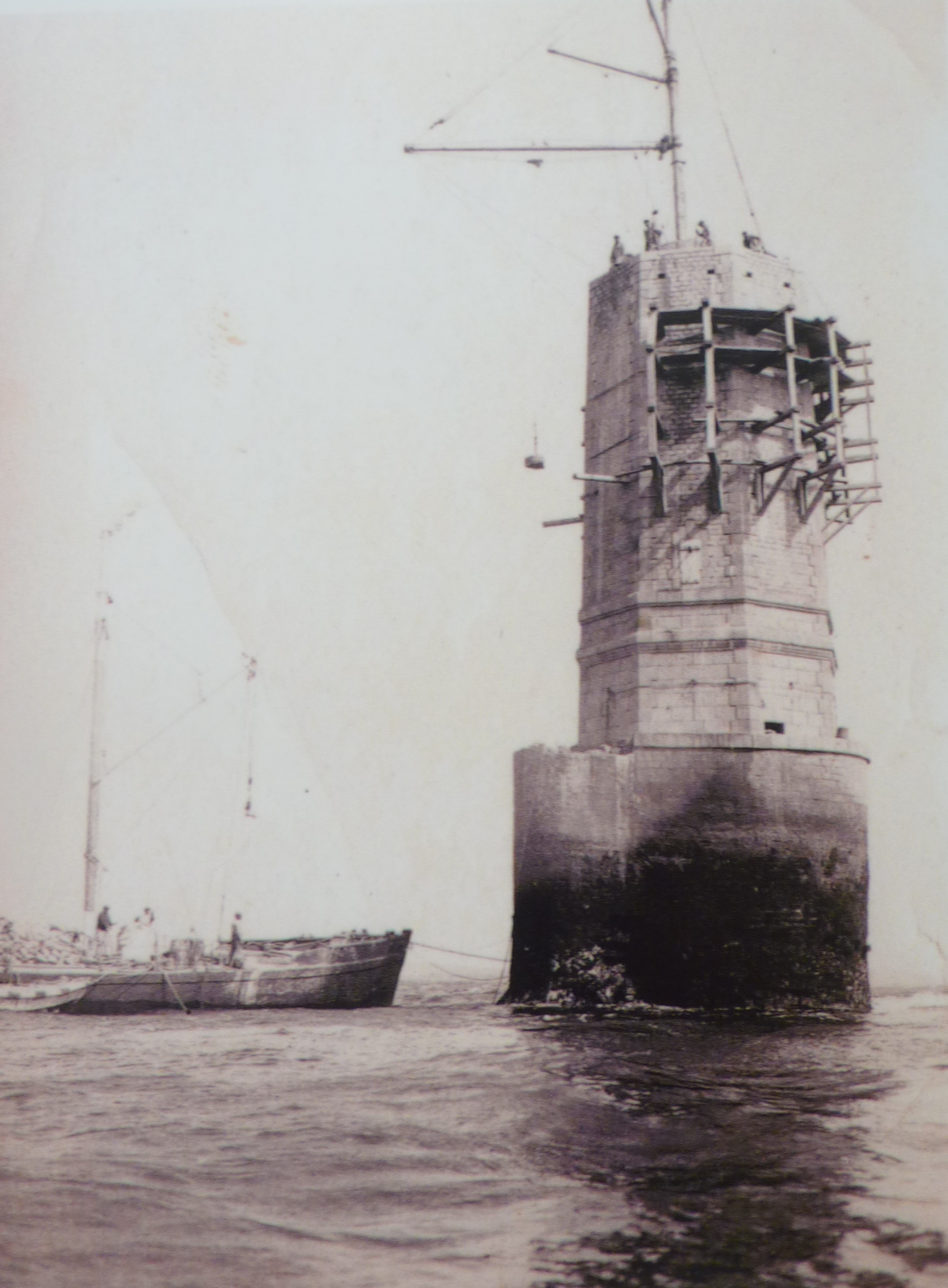
During construction, 1906

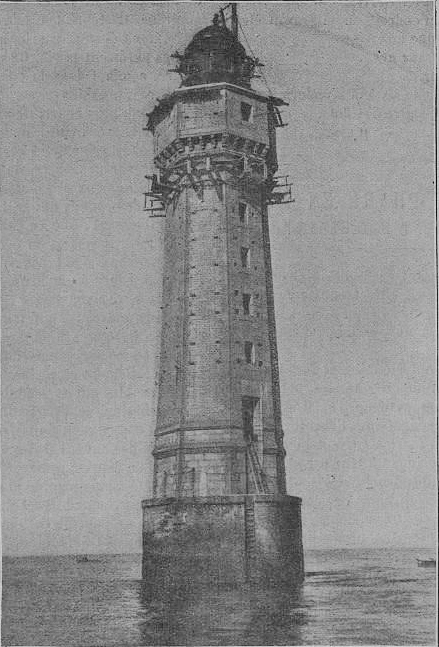
After construction, 1912

The lighthouse became well known in 1989, through a series of photographs taken by Jean Guichard.

Over the past century La Jument lighthouse has effectively increased maritime safety in the area, known to the Bretons as Mer d'Iroise or Iroise Sea. However, the waters off Brittany's west coast still remain one of the most dangerous seas in Europe with frequent violent storms, huge waves and strong currents.

One of those infamous storms on the Iroise Sea happened on 21 December 1989. A front of low pressure coming from Ireland brought gale-force winds and huge waves of 20 to 30 metres high which crashed spectacularly against the lighthouse.

The waves smashed through the lower windows of the lighthouse, ripped the front door, flooded the tower and washed away the furniture.

About the same time, photographer Jean Guichard was in Lorient hiring a helicopter to take aerial pictures of the storm. Guichard wanted to fly over the Iroise Sea despite extremely dangerous flying conditions.

The helicopter made it to La Jument and hovered around for Guichard to take shots of the waves pounding the lighthouse. Inside the tower, Théodore Malgorn heard the helicopter and went downstairs to see what was happening. At that very moment, a giant wave rose over the rear of the lighthouse and Guichard took his world-famous shot as the wave smashed against the tower. Malgorn, suddenly realising that a giant wave was about to engulf the structure, rushed back inside just in time to save his life. In an interview he said "If I had been a little further away from the door, I would not have made it back into the tower. And I would be dead today. You cannot play with the sea."

Jean Guichard's 1989 dramatic storm photo shots became an instant hit and earned him the 2nd place in the 1991 World Press Photo award. La Jument appeared on newspapers and magazines all around the world and Guichard went on to publish a best selling book about lighthouses and a collection of poster prints.

La Jument's poster print has sold well over one million copies, making the Breton lighthouse the most famous lighthouse print in the world.

Lighthouses in Brittany have been automated in the past decades and La Jument itself hasn't had a keeper since 1991. For many years Jean Guichard's quest was to portray Brittany's maritime heritage before automation took over. Many of his photos are now considered to hold a historic value and his work is highly respected in Brittany.

== See also ==
- List of lighthouses in France
- L'Équipier (Cinema of France: The Light, directed by Philippe Lioret)
