= Lists of lighthouses =

This article contains links to lists of lighthouses around the world. According to Lighthouse Directory, more than 18,600 lighthouses exist worldwide.

== Africa ==
Name	Dependency/ territory
Algeria	No
Angola	No
Ascension Island (UK)	Yes
Benin	No
Cameroon	No
Canary Islands (Spain)	Yes
Cape Verde	No
Ceuta (Spain)	Yes
Comoros	No
Democratic Republic of the Congo	No
Republic of the Congo	No
Djibouti	No
Egypt	No
Equatorial Guinea	No
Eritrea	No
Gabon	No
The Gambia	No
Ghana	No
Guinea	No
Guinea-Bissau	No
Ivory Coast	No
Kenya	No
Liberia	No
Libya	No
Madagascar	No
Madeira (Portugal)	Yes
Mauritania	No
Mauritius	No
Mayotte (France)	Yes
Melilla (Spain)	Yes
Morocco	No
Mozambique	No
Namibia	No
Nigeria	No
Réunion (France)	Yes
Saint Helena (UK)	Yes
São Tomé and Príncipe	No
Senegal	No
Seychelles	No
Sierra Leone	No
Somalia	No
Somaliland	No
South Africa	No
Sudan	No
Tanzania	No
Togo	No
Tunisia	No
Uganda	No

== Antarctica ==
- List of lighthouses in Antarctica
- List of lighthouses in the French Southern and Antarctic Lands

== Asia ==
Name	Dependency/ territory
Abkhazia	No
Azerbaijan	No
Bahrain	No
Bangladesh	No
British Indian Ocean Territory (UK)	Yes
Brunei	No
Cambodia	No
China	No
Christmas Island (Australia)	Yes
Cyprus	No
East Timor	No
Hong Kong (China)	Yes
India	No
Indonesia	No
Iran	No
Israel	No
Japan	No
Jordan	No
Kazakhstan	No
Korea (North)	No
Korea (South)	No
Kuwait	No
Lebanon	No
Macau (China)	Yes
Malaysia	No
Maldives	No
Myanmar	No
Nepal	No
Oman	No
Pakistan	No
Palestinian territories	No
Philippines	No
Qatar	No
Russia	No
Saudi Arabia	No
Singapore	No
Sri Lanka	No
Syria	No
Taiwan	Disputed
Turkey	No
Turkmenistan	No
United Arab Emirates	No
Vietnam	No
Yemen	No

== Europe ==
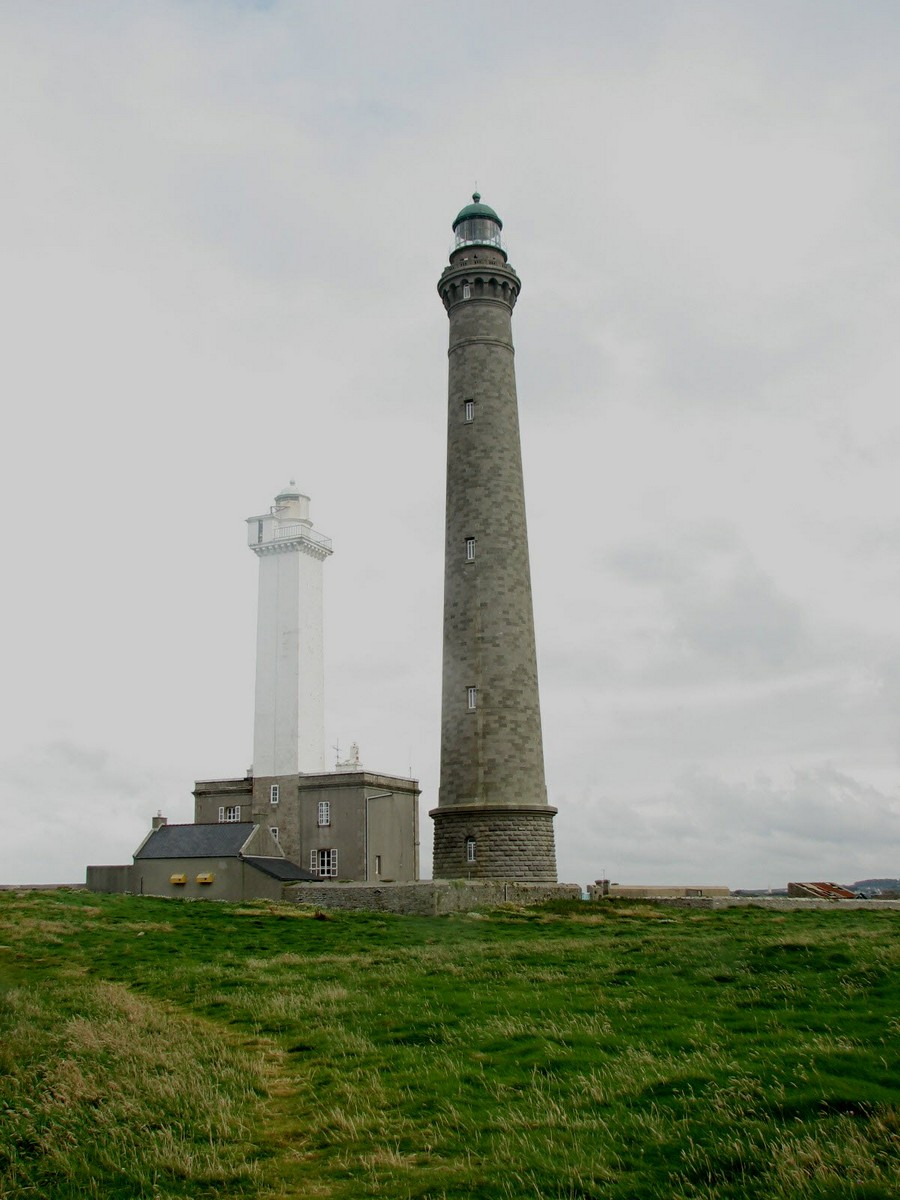
At 82.5 metres (271 ft), Île Vierge Lighthouse (right) is the tallest lighthouse in Europe. It is also the tallest "traditional" lighthouse in the world.

Name	Dependency/ territory
Åland (Finland)	Yes
Albania	No
Austria	No
Belgium	No
Bosnia and Herzegovina	No
Bulgaria	No
Channel Islands (UK)	Yes
Croatia	No
Denmark	No
England (UK)	Yes
Estonia	No
Faroe Islands (Denmark)	Yes
Finland	No
France	No
Georgia	No
Gibraltar (UK)	Yes
Germany	No
Greece	No
Iceland	No
Ireland	No
Isle of Man (UK)	Yes
Italy	No
Latvia	No
Lithuania	No
Malta	No
Monaco	No
Montenegro	No
Netherlands	No
Norway	No
Poland	No
Portugal	No
Romania	No
Scotland (UK)	Yes
Slovenia	No
Spain	No
Svalbard (Norway)	Yes
Sweden	No
Switzerland	No
Ukraine	No
United Kingdom	No
Wales (UK)	Yes

== North America ==
Name	Dependency/ territory
Anguilla (UK)	Yes
Antigua and Barbuda	No
Aruba (Netherlands)	Yes
Bahamas	No
Barbados	No
Belize	No
Bermuda (UK)	Yes
Bonaire (Netherlands)	Yes
British Virgin Islands (UK)	Yes
Canada	No
Cayman Islands (UK)	Yes
Costa Rica	No
Cuba	No
Curaçao (Netherlands)	Yes
Dominica	No
Dominican Republic	No
El Salvador	No
Greenland (Denmark)	Yes
Grenada	No
Guadeloupe (France)	Yes
Guatemala	No
Haiti	No
Honduras	No
Jamaica	No
Martinique (France)	Yes
Mexico	No
Montserrat (UK)	Yes
Nicaragua	No
Panama	No
Puerto Rico (United States)	Yes
Saba (Netherlands)	Yes
Saint Barthélemy (France)	Yes
Saint Kitts and Nevis	No
Saint Lucia	No
Saint Martin (France)	Yes
Saint Pierre and Miquelon (France)	Yes
Saint Vincent and the Grenadines	No
Sint Eustatius (Netherlands)	Yes
Sint Maarten (Netherlands)	Yes
Trinidad and Tobago	No
Turks and Caicos (UK)	Yes
United States	No
United States Virgin Islands (United States)	Yes

== Oceania ==
Name	Dependency/ territory
American Samoa (United States)	Yes
Australia	No
Cook Islands (New Zealand)	Yes
Coral Sea Islands (Australia)	Yes
Federated States of Micronesia	No
Fiji	No
French Polynesia (France)	Yes
Guam (United States)	Yes
Kiribati	No
Marshall Islands	No
New Caledonia (France)	Yes
New Zealand	No
Niue (New Zealand)	Yes
Norfolk Island (Australia)	Yes
Northern Mariana Islands (United States)	Yes
Palau	No
Papua New Guinea	No
Samoa	No
Solomon Islands	No
Tonga	No
Vanuatu	No
Wallis and Futuna (France)	Yes

== South America ==
Name	Dependency/ territory
Argentina	No
Bolivia	No
Brazil	No
Chile	No
Easter Island (Chile)	Yes
El Salvador	No
French Guiana (France)	Yes
Guyana	No
Peru	No
Suriname	No
Falkland Islands (UK)	Yes
Uruguay	No
Venezuela	No

== See also ==
- List of tallest lighthouses in the world
- List of buildings
- Lists of lightvessels
