= List of lighthouses in Kazakhstan =

This is a list of lighthouses in Kazakhstan faced on the Caspian Sea.

== Lighthouses ==
Name	Image	Year built	Location	Coordinates	Class of Light	Focal height	Tower height	ARLHS number
Aktau Lighthouse		1974	Munaily District	43°37′44.8″N 51°09′52.5″E	Fl WR 26s.	71 metres (233 ft)	10 metres (33 ft)	KAZ-005
Eralievo Lighthouse	Image	n/a	Karakiya District	43°06′20.4″N 51°39′35.2″E	inactive	n/a	n/a	KAZ-003
Fetisovo Lighthouse	Image	n/a	Karakiya District	42°44′32.8″N 52°34′45.4″E	inactive	n/a	7 metres (23 ft)	KAZ-001
Kyzyl-Ozen Lighthouse	Image	~1900 est.	Tupkaragan District	44°17′56.6″N 50°29′52.6″E	n/a	n/a	7 metres (23 ft)	n/a
Maykin Kugran Lighthouse	Image	n/a	Tupkaragan District	44°01′26.9″N 50°52′28.7″E	inactive	n/a	6 metres (20 ft)	KAZ-007
Mys Peschannyy Lighthouse		1954	Munaily District	43°11′24.8″N 51°17′05.9″E	n/a	30 metres (98 ft)	n/a	KAZ-004
Mys Rakushechnyy Lighthouse	Image	n/a	Karakiya District	45°50′47.5″N 51°53′55.8″E	inactive	n/a	10 metres (33 ft)	KAZ-002
Tupkaragan Lower Lighthouse	Image	1863	Tupkaragan District	44°32′24.7″N 50°15′35.6″E	F R	16 metres (52 ft)	12 metres (39 ft)	KAZ-008
Tupkaragan Upper Lighthouse		1863	Tupkaragan District	44°36′15.0″N 50°18′21.4″E	n/a	18 metres (59 ft)	n/a	KAZ-009
Zhigylganskiy lighthouse	Image	n/a	Tupkaragan District	44°37′03.2″N 50°50′08.2″E	Fl W 7s.	170 metres (560 ft)	7 metres (23 ft)	KAZ-010

== See also ==
- Lists of lighthouses and lightvessels
