= List of lighthouses in the Falkland Islands =

This is a list of lighthouses in Falkland Islands.

== Lighthouses ==
Name	Image	Year built	Coordinates	Class of light	Focal height	NGA number	Admiralty number	Range nml
Cape Pembroke Lighthouse		1987	51°40′54.6″S 57°43′13.44″W	Fl (3) W 20s.	30 metres (98 ft)	20336	G1352	10
Fox Point Lighthouse		n/a	51°55′18.7″S 58°24′10.1″W	Fl (2) 10s.	14 metres (46 ft)	20353	G1353	10
Kukri Point Lighthouse		n/a	51°54′20.8″S 58°25′41.6″W	Oc W 6s.	8 metres (26 ft)	20359.1	G1356	7
Mare Harbor Lighthouse		n/a	51°54′02.2″S 58°28′13.6″W	Oc WRG 5s.	20 metres (66 ft)	20357	G1354	white: 9 red: 6 green: 7
Mengeary Point Lighthouse		n/a	51°38′46.0″S 57°43′49.3″W	Fl (2) W 7s.	7 metres (23 ft)	20340	G1342	10
Navy Point Lighthouse		n/a	51°40′56.9″S 57°49′52.9″W	Fl R 6s.	5 metres (16 ft)	20348	G1346	2
Porpoise Point Lighthouse		1990	52°20′33.6″S 59°18′37.0″W	Fl W 10s.	n/a	20361	G1359	10
Providence Head Lighthouse		n/a	51°54′40.1″S 58°26′24.5″W	Fl WR 2s.	8 metres (26 ft)	20359	G1355	6

== See also ==
- Lists of lighthouses and lightvessels
