= List of lighthouses in Venezuela =

This is a list of lighthouses in Venezuela.

== Lighthouses ==
Name	Image	Year built	Location & coordinates	Class of Light	Focal height	NGA number	Admiralty number	Range nml
Borracha Lighthouse	Image	n/a	La Borracha Island; 10°18′11.8″N 64°44′01.3″W	Fl W 6s.	381 metres (1,250 ft)	17090	J6479.5	19
Cabo Codera Lighthouse	Image	n/a	Brión; 10°34′32.9″N 66°03′12.3″W	Fl W 2.5s.	168 metres (551 ft)	17084	J6469	13
Cabo de la Isla Lighthouse	Image	1929 est.	Margarita Island; 11°10′28.9″N 63°53′03.1″W	Fl W 5s.	70 metres (230 ft)	17160	J6502	19
Cabo San Roman Lighthouse		2004	Falcón; 12°11′22.4″N 69°59′54.9″W	Fl W 6s.	26 metres (85 ft)	16900	J6314	23
Cabo Tres Puntas Lighthouse	Image	n/a	Paria Peninsula; 10°45′51.0″N 62°42′43.5″W	Fl W 5s.	200 metres (660 ft)	17194	J6514	19
Carúpano Lighthouse		1887 est.	Carúpano; 10°40′13.6″N 63°14′57.2″W	Fl W 9s.	205 metres (673 ft)	17184	J6510	25
Cerro Walker Lighthouse		n/a	La Orchila; 11°48′48.1″N 66°10′52.8″W	Fl W 10s.	20 metres (66 ft)	17024	J6426	20
Club Puerto Azul Lighthouse	Image	n/a	Naiguatá; 10°37′08.5″N 66°44′41.3″W	Fl W 11s.	55 metres (180 ft)	17077	J6461.85	20
Cumaná Landfall Lighthouse		n/a	Cumaná; 10°27′57.6″N 64°09′57.8″W	Fl W 12s.	61 metres (200 ft)	17141	J6488	25
El Gran Roque Lighthouse	Image	n/a	Gran Roque; 11°57′07.6″N 66°40′36.3″W	Fl W 10s.	114 metres (374 ft)	17008	J6424	18
Farallón Centinela Lighthouse		2001	Farallón Centinela; 10°48′54.0″N 66°05′30.0″W	Fl W 12s.	38 metres (125 ft)	17036	J6462	25
Fortin Solano Lighthouse	Image	n/a	Fortín Solano; 10°27′46.2″N 68°01′00.6″W	Fl (3) w 15.5s.	168 metres (551 ft)	16976	J6447	30
Isla Aves Lighthouse		2002	Isla Aves; 14°40′00.5″N 63°37′05.9″W	Fl W 5s.	19 metres (62 ft)	16851	J5700	15
Isla Borrachitos del Este Lighthouse	Image	n/a	Anzoátegui; 10°15′08.2″N 64°45′39.9″W	Fl W 15s.	25 metres (82 ft)	17089	J6479	6
Isla Chimana Segunda Lighthouse		1931	Anzoátegui; 10°17′28.3″N 64°36′23.5″W	Fl W 10s.	50 metres (160 ft)	17140	J6481	11
Isla Cotorra Lighthouse		n/a	Delta Amacuro; 10°03′12.0″N 62°14′30.0″W	Fl W 15s.	14 metres (46 ft)	17227	J6615	11
Isla de Adentro Lighthouse		n/a	Anzoátegui; 10°08′38.7″N 64°54′46.8″W	Fl W 7.5s.	16 metres (52 ft)	17088.5	J6478.2	11
Isla de Patos Lighthouse	Image	2012	Patos Island; 10°38′19.4″N 61°52′00.1″W	Fl W 5s.	114 metres (374 ft)	17200	J6517	20
Isla La Blanquilla Lighthouse	Image	n/a	Isla La Blanquilla; 11°49′21.6″N 64°36′15.0″W	Fl W 6s.	27 metres (89 ft)	17014	J6476	20
Islas Piritu Lighthouse	Image		Anzoátegui; 10°09′51.3″N 64°58′35.4″W	Fl W 10s.	20 metres (66 ft)	17088	J6478	11
Isla San Carlos Lighthouse	Image	2013	Zulia; 11°00′00.6″N 71°36′16.0″W	Fl W 10s.	23 metres (75 ft)	16860.2	J6275	18
Isla Testigo Grande Lighthouse		n/a	Los Testigos Islands; 11°22′54.0″N 63°07′12.0″W	Fl W 10s.	445 metres (1,460 ft)	17192	J6509	23
La Guaira Lighthouse	Image	n/a	La Guaira; 10°54′34.0″N 66°56′48.0″W (NGA)	L Fl W 15.5s.	425 metres (1,394 ft)	17058	J6458.5	25
La Sabana Lighthouse	Image	n/a	Vargas; 10°37′15.2″N 66°23′00.9″W	Fl W 7.5s.	60 metres (200 ft)	17082	J6461.95	11
Macuro Lighthouse	Image	n/a	Macuro; 10°39′42.5″N 61°56′08.7″W	Fl W 4s.	76 metres (249 ft)	17196	J6518	11
Monjes del Sur Lighthouse		2003	Los Monjes Archipelago; 12°21′37.1″N 70°54′08.0″W	Fl W 11s.	77 metres (253 ft)	16852	J6270	28
Morro Choroní Lighthouse	Image	n/a	Choroní; 10°30′42.0″N 67°36′14.2″W	Fl W 5s.	106 metres (348 ft)	16996	J6453.4	18
Morro de Chacopata Lighthouse		1937 est.	Cruz Salmerón Acosta Municipality; 10°42′26.5″N 63°48′42.1″W	Fl W 15s.	57 metres (187 ft)	17148	J6490	11
Morro de Robledal Lighthouse	Image	n/a	Macanao Peninsula; 11°02′34.9″N 64°22′37.8″W	Fl W 8s.	80 metres (260 ft)	17164	J6500	19
Puerto Cruz Lighthouse	Image	n/a	Vargas; 10°32′12.7″N 67°20′54.1″W	Fl W 10s.	321 metres (1,053 ft)	17037	J6453.5	15
Puerto Hierro Lighthouse		n/a	Gulf of Paria; 10°37′57.6″N 62°05′47.1″W	Fl W 6s.	65 metres (213 ft)	17204	J6521	11
Puerto Santo Lighthouse	Image	n/a	Sucre; 10°43′32.1″N 63°09′58.0″W	Fl W 12s.	40 metres (130 ft)	17190	J6509.8	15
Punta Adícora Lighthouse		1931 est.	Adícora; 11°56′37.8″N 69°48′12.1″W	Fl W 16s.	16 metres (52 ft)	16904	J6428	23
Punta Arena Lighthouse	Image	n/a	Cruz Salmerón Acosta Municipality; 10°30′56.2″N 64°14′38.8″W	Fl W 12s.	41 metres (135 ft)	17144	J6489	11
Punta Ballena Lighthouse		2007	Pampatar; 10°59′52.6″N 63°46′39.3″W	Fl W 10s.	76 metres (249 ft)	17155.5	J6502.25	30
Punta Barima Lighthouse	Image	1906 est.	Corocoro Island; 8°36′09.6″N 60°25′08.8″W	Fl W 10s.	24 metres (79 ft)	17242	J6800	15
Punta Brava Lighthouse	Image	1901	Puerto Cabello; 10°29′24.4″N 68°00′31.8″W	Fl W 6s.	37 metres (121 ft)	16964	J6448	15
Punta Charagato Lighthouse		n/a	Cubagua; 10°50′26.9″N 64°09′22.6″W	Fl W 12s.	15 metres (49 ft)	17172	J6494	11
Punta Faragoza Lighthouse		1997	Margarita Island; 11°07′30.5″N 63°55′57.2″W	Fl W 8s.	85 metres (279 ft)	17162	J6501	20
Punta Macolla Lighthouse		1988	Falcón; 12°05′42.7″N 70°12′38.0″W	Fl W 10s.	48 metres (157 ft)	16896	J6312	20
Punta Mejilones Lighthouse		n/a	Sucre; 10°42′25.1″N 62°08′32.1″W	Fl W 12s.	43 metres (141 ft)	17195	J6515	12
Punta Palanquete Lighthouse	Image	2004	Cubagua; 10°49′50.3″N 64°12′38.3″W	Fl W 8s.	13 metres (43 ft)	17168	J6492	11
Punta Perret Lighthouse	Image	2010	Zulia; 11°47′40.8″N 71°20′22.7″W	Fl W 15s.	29 metres (95 ft)	16856	J6269	24
Punta Sebastopol Lighthouse	Image	2002	Los Roques archipelago 11°46′18.6″N 66°35′11.8″W	Fl W 6s.	16 metres (52 ft)	17016	J6425.4	12
Recalada Güiria Lighthouse	Image	2010	Güiria; 10°34′48.8″N 62°17′27.2″W	Fl W 10s.	63 metres (207 ft)	17210	J6524	23
Unare Lighthouse		2008	mouth of Unare River; 10°05′31.6″N 65°10′45.2″W	Fl W 12s.	15 metres (49 ft)	17087	J6477.5	18

== See also ==
- Lists of lighthouses and lightvessels
