= List of lighthouses in Senegal =

This is a list of lighthouses in Senegal.

== Lighthouses ==
Name	Image	Year built	Location & coordinates	Class of light	Focal height	NGA number	Admiralty number	Range nml
Cap Manuel Lighthouse		1869 est.	Dakar; 14°38′57.8″N 17°25′57.4″W	Fl R 5s.	50 metres (160 ft)	24396	D3008	19
Cap Manuel close S.E. Lighthouse		1869 est.	Dakar; 14°38′57.8″N 17°25′57.4″W	F WR	48 metres (157 ft)	24400	D3008.2	white: 11 red: 8
Chaussée des Almadies Lighthouse		n/a	Dakar; 14°44′33.7″N 17°32′28.5″W	Fl (2) W 6s.	14 metres (46 ft)	24388	D3002	9
Dakar North Jetty Lighthouse		n/a	Dakar; 14°40′43.8″N 17°25′13.7″W	Iso G 4s.	9 metres (30 ft)	24408	D3012	8
Dakar South Jetty Lighthouse		n/a	Dakar; 14°40′35.6″N 17°25′12.1″W	Oc (4) R 12s.	11 metres (36 ft)	24412	D3013	8
Île de Gorée Lighthouse		1843 est.	Île de Gorée; 14°39′50.4″N 17°23′52.5″W	Oc (2) WR 6s.	21 metres (69 ft)	24404	D3010	white:12 red: 8
Joal Lighthouse		n/a	Joal-Fadiouth; 14°09′00.0″N 16°50′00.0″W (NGA)	Os W 4s.	14 metres (46 ft)	24444	D3019	11
Les Mamelles Lighthouse		1864	Cap-Vert; 14°43′25.8″N 17°30′05.9″W	Fl W 5s.	120 metres (390 ft)	24392	D3004	31
Rufisque Lighthouse		1879 est.	Rufisque; 14°42′39.1″N 17°16′54.3″W	Iso G 2s.	12 metres (39 ft)	24440	D3018	11
Saint-Louis Lighthouse		n/a	Saint-Louis; 16°01′34.9″N 16°30′33.5″W	Fl (2) W 6s.	15 metres (49 ft)	24380	D2996	12
Saint-Louis Gandiole Lighthouse		1843	Saint-Louis Region; 15°53′43.3″N 16°30′29.7″W	Oc (3) W 12s.	26 metres (85 ft)	24384	D2998	10

== See also ==
- List of lighthouses in Mauritania (to the north)
- List of lighthouses in the Gambia
- List of lighthouses in Guinea-Bissau (to the south)
- Lists of lighthouses and lightvessels
