= List of lighthouses in Georgia (country) =

This is a list of lighthouses in Georgia.

== Lighthouses ==
Name	Image	Year built	Coordinates	Class of Light	Focal height	NGA number	Admiralty number	Range nml
Anaklia Lighthouse		2011	42°23′24.7″N 41°33′47.8″E	Fl WRG	47 metres (154 ft)	19256	E5746	white: 24 red: 21 green: 21
Batumi Lighthouse		n/a	41°39′21.2″N 41°38′28.4″E	Fl (2) R 6s.	20 metres (66 ft)	19324	E5768	14
Batumi Approach Range Front Lighthouse		n/a	41°38′59.5″N 41°39′00.3″E	F Bu	22 metres (72 ft)	19334	E5773	4
Batumi Approach Range Rear Lighthouse		n/a	41°38′48.5″N 41°39′05.5″E	F Bu	26 metres (85 ft)	19334.1	E5773.1	4
Batumi Petroleum Harbor Lighthouse		1904	41°33′58.5″N 41°38′55.7″E	F WRG	13 metres (43 ft)	19328	E5772	11
Batumi Range Front Lighthouse		n/a	41°39′10.1″N 41°38′37.5″E	F R	23 metres (75 ft)	19335	E5773.6	4
Batumi Range Rear Lighthouse		n/a	41°39′11.3″N 41°38′36.2″E	F R	12 metres (39 ft)	19335.1	E5773.61	4
Kobuleti Lighthouse		n/a	41°51′05.6″N 41°46′39.8″E	Fl G 3s.	37 metres (121 ft)	19320	E5785	15
Poti Lighthouse		1864	42°08′00.0″N 41°39′39.9″E	Al Fl WR 7.5s.	36 metres (118 ft)	19284	E5749.1	white: 17 red: 16
Poti Entrance Range Front Lighthouse		n/a	42°09′34.3″N 41°38′55.5″E	F R	13 metres (43 ft)	19277	E5762	5
Poti Entrance Range Rear Lighthouse		n/a	42°09′28.5″N 41°39′05.3″E	F R	20 metres (66 ft)	19277.1	E5762.1	5
Poti Inner Range Front Lighthouse		n/a	42°08′57.8″N 41°39′08.5″E	F G	11 metres (36 ft)	19280	E5749	6
Sarpi Range Rear Lighthouse		1980	41°31′09.5″N 41°33′05.7″E	Oc W 4s.	60 metres (200 ft)	19348	E5779.1	14
Sukhumi Lighthouse		1861	42°58′53.1″N 40°58′18.6″E	L Fl (2) W 15s.	14 metres (46 ft)	19212	E5726	17

== See also ==
- Lists of lighthouses and lightvessels
