= List of lighthouses in Slovenia =

This is a list of lighthouses in Slovenia.

== Lighthouses ==
Name	Image	Year built	Coordinates	Class of Light	Focal height	NGA number	Admiralty number	Range nml
Izola Rt Petelin Lighthouse		Circa 1950s*	45°32′29.7″N 13°39′21.8″E	Fl W 5s.	7 metres (23 ft)	11836	E2618	6
Piran Rt Madona Lighthouse		1872	45°31′48.8″N 13°33′47.9″E	Iso W 4s.	13 metres (43 ft)	11848	E2624	15
Piran Transverse Mole Lighthouse		1876	45°31′34.1″N 13°34′00.7″E	Fl G 3s,	7 metres (23 ft)	11852	E2630	4
Piran West Mole Lighthouse		1843	45°31′34.3″N 13°33′59.0″E	Fl R 3s.	7 metres (23 ft)	11856	E2628	3
Rt Debeli Lighthouse		n/a	45°35′28.2″N 13°41′59.0″E	Q (9) W 15s.	8 metres (26 ft)	11812	E2607	8
Rt Sveti Bernardin Lighthouse		1873 est.	45°30′49.7″N 13°34′22.8″E	Fl R 5s.	9 metres (30 ft)	11860	E2632	3

== See also ==
- Lists of lighthouses and lightvessels
