= List of lighthouses in the Federated States of Micronesia =

This is a list of lighthouses in the Federated States of Micronesia.

== Chuuk lighthouses ==
| Name | Image | Year built | Location & coordinates | Class of light | Focal height | NGA number | Admiralty number | Range nml |
|---|---|---|---|---|---|---|---|---|
| Chuuk Northeast Pass Lighthouse | | N/A | 7°30′00.5″N 151°58′26.7″E | Fl W 6s. | 9 metres (30 ft) | 10944 | M8447 | 6 |
| Poluwat Lighthouse | Image | 1940 | 7°22′15.4″N 149°10′11.4″E | Inactive | 32 metres (105 ft) (tower) | N/A | N/A | N/A |
| Sapuk Lighthouse | Image | 1937 | 7°26′54.6″N 151°53′46.1″E | Inactive | 13 metres (43 ft) (tower) | N/A | N/A | N/A |

== Kosrae lighthouses ==
| Name | Image | Year built | Location & coordinates | Class of light | Focal height | NGA number | Admiralty number | Range nml |
|---|---|---|---|---|---|---|---|---|
| Lele Harbour Range Front Lighthouse | | N/A | 5°19′36.0″N 163°01′24.0″E | Q R | 3 metres (9.8 ft) | 10952.2 | M8457 | N/A |
| Okat Harbour Range Front Lighthouse | | N/A | 5°20′46.1″N 162°57′27.9″E | Iso W 3s. | 16 metres (52 ft) | 10952.7 | M8459.1 | 5 |
| Okat Harbour Range Rear Lighthouse | | N/A | 5°20′45.2″N 162°57′37.3″E | F W | 11 metres (36 ft) | 10952.6 | M8459 | 5 |

== Pohnpei lighthouses ==
| Name | Image | Year built | Location & coordinates | Class of light | Focal height | NGA number | Admiralty number | Range nml |
|---|---|---|---|---|---|---|---|---|
| Jokaj Passage Range Front Lighthouse | | N/A | 6°58′10.4″N 158°11′17.4″E | Q W | 7 metres (23 ft) | 10948 | M8453 | N/A |
| Jokaj Passage Range Rear Lighthouse | | N/A | 6°58′59.7″N 158°11′24.9″E | Iso W 6s. | 14 metres (46 ft) | 10948.1 | M8453.1 | N/A |

== Yap lighthouses ==
| Name | Image | Year built | Location & coordinates | ARLHS number |
|---|---|---|---|---|
| Dalap Lighthouse | | 1941 | Yap; 9°31′45.5″N 138°10′33.0″E | MIC-003 |

== See also ==
- Lists of lighthouses
