= List of lighthouses in the Marshall Islands =

This is a list of lighthouses in Marshall Islands.

== Lighthouses ==
Name	Image	Year built	Location & coordinates	Class of Light	Focal height	NGA number	Admiralty number	Range nml
Eroj Lighthouse		n/a	Majuro; 7°09′48.0″N 171°09′54.0″E (NGA)	Fl W 6s	27 metres (89 ft)	11060	M8465	7

== See also ==
- Lists of lighthouses and lightvessels
