= List of lighthouses in the Cook Islands =

This is a list of lighthouses in Cook Islands.

== Lighthouses ==
Name	Image	Year built	Location & coordinates	Class of light	Focal height	NGA number	Admiralty number	Range nml
Aitutaki Lighthouse		n/a	Aitutaki; 18°50′19.0″S 159°46′49.1″W	Fl (2) W 9s.	129 metres (423 ft)	3076	K4570	7
Arutanga Range Front Lighthouse	Image	n/a	Arutanga; 18°51′54.0″S 159°48′00.0″W	F R	12 metres (39 ft)	3077	K4571	n/a
Arutanga Range Front Lighthouse		n/a	Arutanga; 18°52′00.0″S 159°47′54.0″W	F R	n/a	3077.1	K4571.1	n/a
Avarua Range Front Lighthouse		n/a	Avarua; 21°12′24.7″S 159°46′30.1″W	F Bu	6 metres (20 ft)	3060	K4559	2
Avarua Range Rear Lighthouse	Image	n/a	Avarua; 21°12′25.5″S 159°46′30.3″W	Oc Bu 8s.	n/a	3056	K4552.1	2
Avatiu Range Front Lighthouse	Image	n/a	Avatiu; 21°12′22.1″S 159°47′05.2″W	F Bu	6 metres (20 ft)	3060	K4559	2
Avatiu Range Rear Lighthouse	Image	n/a	Avatiu; 21°12′20.4″S 159°47′05.6″W	F Bu	12 metres (39 ft)	3064	K4559.1	2

== See also ==
- Lists of lighthouses and lightvessels
