= List of lighthouses in Réunion =

This is a list of lighthouses in Réunion.

== Lighthouses ==
Name	Image	Year built	Location & coordinates	Class of light	Focal height	NGA number	Admiralty number	Range nml
Le Port Lighthouse		n/a	20°56′08.1″S 55°17′06.2″E	Fl (2) W 6s.	53 metres (174 ft)	32896	D7077	21
Le Port Jetée Nord Lighthouse		n/a	20°56′09.2″S 55°16′56.7″E	Fl (2) R 6s.	17 metres (56 ft)	32912	D7081.9	7
Le Port Jetée Sud Lighthouse		n/a	20°56′13.8″S 55°16′53.8″E	Fl (2) G 6s.	17 metres (56 ft)	32908	D7078	7
Pointe de Bel-Air Lighthouse		1846	20°54′05.1″S 55°36′07.1″E	Fl (3) W 15s.	48 metres (157 ft)	32972	D7084	23
Pointe de la Table Lighthouse		~1989	21°19′42.5″S 55°48′09.2″E	Oc (2) W 6s.	60 metres (200 ft)	32976	D7086	8
Port Est Jetée de l'Est Lighthouse		n/a	20°55′35.0″S 55°19′19.1″E	Fl R 4s.	15 metres (49 ft)	32956	D7083.7	7
Port Est Jetée de l'Ouest Lighthouse		n/a	20°55′37.9″S 55°19′08.5″E	Fl G 4s.	15 metres (49 ft)	32952	D7083.75	7
Port Est Leading Lighthouse		n/a	20°56′17.0″S 55°19′27.6″E	Dir WRG	38 metres (125 ft)	32948	D7083.61	white: 4 red: 2 green: 2
Saint Gilles Les Bains West Jetty Lighthouse		n/a	21°03′18.0″S 55°13′18.0″E	Oc (2) G 6s.	12 metres (39 ft)	33004	D7091	7
Saint-Leu Jetty Lighthouse		n/a	21°10′06.0″S 55°17′06.0″E	Fl G 4s.	9 metres (30 ft)	33000	D7090	5
Sainte-Marie West Breakwater Lighthouse		n/a	20°53′29.9″S 55°32′11.7″E	Fl G 2.5s.	11 metres (36 ft)	32970	D7083.93	3
Sainte-Marie East Breakwater Lighthouse		n/a	20°53′30.4″S 55°32′15.5″E	Fl R 2.5s.	11 metres (36 ft)	32970.2	D7083.95	3
Saint-Paul Lighthouse		n/a	21°00′26.3″S 55°16′07.4″E	Oc W 4s.	9 metres (30 ft)	33020	D7092	9
Saint Pierre Jetty Lighthouse		n/a	21°20′52.9″S 55°28′43.9″E	Fl WG 4s.	13 metres (43 ft)	32978	D7089.05	white: 10 green: 7
Sainte-Rose-la-Marine Lighthouse		n/a	21°07′30.9″S 55°47′11.8″E	Fl (4) WR 15s.	15 metres (49 ft)	n/a	D7085	n/a

== See also ==
- Lists of lighthouses and lightvessels
