= List of lighthouses in Guinea =

This is a list of lighthouses in Guinea.

== Lighthouses ==
Name	Image	Year built	Location & coordinates	Class of light	Focal height	NGA number	Admiralty number	Range nml
Boulbinet Lighthouse		1906	9°30′10.18″N 13°43′11.1″W	Oc (2) WR 12s.	13 metres (43 ft)	24636	D3093	white: 12 red: 10
Cap Gonzales Lighthouse		n/a	10°24′16.2″N 14°41′21.1″W	Fl (3) W 15s.	10 metres (33 ft)	24612	D3087	15
Cap Verga Lighthouse		n/a	10°15′06.5″N 14°26′24.4″W	Fl (2) W 10s.	120 metres (390 ft)	24616	D3088	20
Conakry Dique de la Prudente Lighthouse		n/a	9°30′34.6″N 13°43′20.2″W	VQ (6); L Fl W 10s.	13 metres (43 ft)	24640	D3094	7
Île Matakong Lighhtouse		1902	9°16′02.1″N 13°25′48.7″W	Iso W 4s.	21 metres (69 ft)	24648	D3096	6
Île Tamara Lighthouse		1906	9°27′28.7″N 13°50′01.1″W	Fl W 5s.	95 metres (312 ft)	24620	D3090	26

== See also ==
- List of lighthouses in Guinea-Bissau (to the north)
- List of lighthouses in Sierra Leone (to the south)
- Lists of lighthouses and lightvessels
