= List of lighthouses in Ceuta =

This is a list of lighthouses in Ceuta.

== Lighthouses ==
Name	Image	Year built	Location & coordinates	Class of light	Focal height	NGA number	Admiralty number	Range nml
Ceuta West Breakwater Lighthouse		n/a	35°53′45.5″N 5°18′41.2″W	Fl G 5s.	13 metres (43 ft)	22844	D2486	5
Punta Almina Lighthouse		1855	35°53′53.8″N 5°16′50.9″W	Fl (2) W 10s.	148 metres (486 ft)	22840	D2482	22

== See also ==
- List of lighthouses in Spain
- Lists of lighthouses and lightvessels
