= List of lighthouses in Kiribati =

This is a list of lighthouses in Kiribati, an island nation in the central Pacific Ocean.

== Lighthouses ==
Name	Image	Year built	Location & coordinates	Class of Light	Focal height	NGA number	Admiralty number	Range nml
Betio Lighthouse		n/a	Betio; 1°21′15.3″N 172°55′14.8″E	Fl W 8s.	32 metres (105 ft)	11080	M8512	18
Enderbury Island Lighthouse		1938	Enderbury Island; 3°08′29.0″S 171°05′28.0″W	inactive	9 metres (30 ft) (tower)	n/a	n/a	n/a
Canton Island Lighthouse	Image	1838	Canton Island; 2°48′55.1″S 171°42′44.4″W	inactive	8 metres (26 ft) (tower)	n/a	n/a	n/a
Tabuaeran Lighthouse		1957	Tabuaeran; 3°51′31.6″N 159°21′43.1″W	F W	9 metres (30 ft)	11108	M8528	12
Tarawa Lighthouse		n/a	Tarawa; 1°38′09.3″N 172°57′23.1″E	L Fl W 20s.	21 metres (69 ft)	11076	M8508	n/a

== See also ==
- Lists of lighthouses and lightvessels
