= List of lighthouses in Lebanon =

This is a list of lighthouses in Lebanon.

== Lighthouses ==
Name	Image	Year built	Location & coordinates	Class of Light	Focal height	NGA number	Admiralty number	Range nml
Az Zirah Lighthouse		~1930s	Sidon; 33°34′18.3″N 35°22′03.6″E	Fl R 3s.	10 metres (33 ft)	21140	E5940	6
Jazirat Ramkin Lighthouse		1864 est.	Ramkin Island; 34°29′49.4″N 35°45′39.0″E	Fl W 3.3s.	22 metres (72 ft)	21048	E5926	18
Ra's Bayrūt Lighthouse		1956	Beirut; 33°53′51.0″N 35°28′21.1″E	inactive				
Ra's Bayrūt Lighthouse		2003	Beirut; 33°54′00.3″N 35°28′11.5″E	Fl (2) W 10s.	52 metres (171 ft)	21116	E5934	22
Tower of Lions Lighthouse		late 1400s	34°26′59.8″N 35°49′50.6″E	F R	n/a	21060	E5927.6	3
Tyre Lighthouse		~1912	Tyre; 33°16′33.6″N 35°11′36.1″E	Fl (3) W 12s.	15 metres (49 ft)	21192	E5942	12

== See also ==
- Lists of lighthouses and lightvessels
