= List of lighthouses in Sierra Leone =

This is a list of lighthouses in Sierra Leone.

== Lighthouses ==
Name	Image	Year built	Location & coordinates	Class of light	Focal height	NGA number	Admiralty number	Range nml
Cape Sierra Leone Lighthouse		1849	Freetown; 8°29′54.6″N 13°17′47.8″W	L Fl W 15s.	19 metres (62 ft)	24656	D3098	14
Meheux Island Lighthouse		n/a	Banana Islands; 8°05′40.0″N 13°14′44.5″W	L Fl W 20s.	30 metres (98 ft)	24692	D3102	8
Queen Elizabeth II quay Lighthouse		n/a	Freetown; 8°29′37.6″N 13°12′36.0″W	Fl (3) G	28 metres (92 ft)	24672	D3100.2	2

== See also ==
- List of lighthouses in Guinea (to the north)
- List of lighthouses in Liberia (to the south)
- Lists of lighthouses and lightvessels
