= List of lighthouses in Liberia =

This is a list of lighthouses in Liberia.

== Lighthouses ==
Name	Image	Year built	Location & coordinates	Class of light	Focal height	NGA number	Admiralty number	Range nml number	Admiralty number	Range nml
Buchanan Main Breakwater Lighthouse		n/a	5°51′25.7″N 10°03′37.4″W	Fl G 3s. currently inactive	9 metres (30 ft)	24740	D3112.4	3		
Buchanan North Breakwater Lighthouse		n/a	5°51′34.6″N 10°03′27.0″W	Fl R 3s. currently inactive	8 metres (26 ft)	24744	D3112.6	3		
Cape Mesurado Lighthouse		~1900	6°19′14.8″N 10°48′56.4″W	Fl W 6s.	85 metres (279 ft)	24696	D3105	21		
Cape Palmas Lighthouse		1847 est.	4°22′16.4″N 7°43′33.6″W	Fl (2) W 16s.	32 metres (105 ft)	24760	D3116	24		
Grand Bassa Point Lighthouse		1906 est.	5°52′07.2″N 10°03′40.5″W	Iso WR 4s.	29 metres (95 ft)	24724	D3112	15		
South Point Breakwater Head Lighthouse		n/a	4°59′22.8″N 9°02′42.2″W	Fl G 3s.	5 metres (16 ft)	24756	D3115.5	n/a		
South Point Lighthouse		n/a	4°58′52.3″N 9°02′15.3″W	Fl (4) W 20s.	32 metres (105 ft)	24752	D3114	23		

== See also ==
- List of lighthouses in Sierra Leone (to the north)
- List of lighthouses in Ivory Coast (to the east)
- Lists of lighthouses and lightvessels
