= List of lighthouses in Montserrat =

This is a list of lighthouses in Montserrat.

== Lighthouses ==
Name	Image	Year built	Location & coordinates	Class of light	Focal height	NGA number	Admiralty number	Range nml
Plymouth Lighthouse		n/a	Plymouth; 16°42′18.0″N 62°13′18.0″W	F R	10 metres (33 ft)	14765	J5686	n/a

== See also ==
- Lists of lighthouses and lightvessels
