= List of lighthouses in Gabon =

This is a list of lighthouses in Gabon.

== Lighthouses ==
Name	Image	Year built	Location & coordinates	Class of light	Focal height	NGA number	Admiralty number	Range nml
Cap Estérias Lighthouse		2012	0°37′12.0″N 9°19′36.0″E	Fl (2+1) W 12s.	18 metres (59 ft)	25312	D4272	8
Cap Lopez Lighthouse		2012	0°37′52.4″S 8°42′16.1″E	Fl W 5s.	36 metres (118 ft)	25373	D4290,1	20
Gamba Lighthouse		n/a	2°47′00.0″S 10°01′06.0″E	Fl (2) W 10s.	47 metres (154 ft)	25444	D8610	18
Pointe Gombé Lighthouse		1891	0°18′23.9″N 9°18′08.3″E	Fl W 10s.	57 metres (187 ft)	25316	D4276	25
Pointe N'Dombo Lighthouse		n/a	0°56′18.0″N 9°33′06.0″E	Fl W 4s.	7 metres (23 ft)	25304	D4260	8
Pointe Owendo Lighthouse		n/a	0°17′15.1″N 9°30′15.5″E	Fl (2) W 6s.	46 metres (151 ft)	25356	D4286	8

== See also ==
- List of lighthouses in Equatorial Guinea (to the north)
- List of lighthouses in the Republic of the Congo (to the south)
- Lists of lighthouses and lightvessels
