= List of lighthouses in Niue =

This is a list of lighthouses in Niue.

== Lighthouses ==
Name	Image	Year built	Location & coordinates	Class of Light	Focal height	NGA number	Admiralty number	Range nml
Alofi Range Front Lighthouse	Image	n/a	Alofi; 19°03′10.1″S 169°55′13.0″W	F R	n/a	n/a	K4656	n/a
Alofi Range Rear Lighthouse	Image	n/a	Alofi; 19°03′10.9″S 169°55′13.6″W	F R	24 metres (79 ft)	3160	K4656.1	n/a

== See also ==
- Lists of lighthouses and lightvessels
