= List of lighthouses in Yemen =

This is a list of lighthouses in Yemen.

== Lighthouses ==
Name	Image	Year built	Location & coordinates	Class of light	Focal height	NGA number	Admiralty number	Range nml
Abu Ali Lighthouse		1903	Abu Ali Island; 14°04′41.9″N 42°48′53.9″E	Fl (2) W 10s.	104 metres (341 ft)	30892	D7300.8	13
Aden Entrance Range Rear Lighthouse		n/a	Aden; 12°47′20.1″N 44°53′06.2″E	Iso G 2s.	26 metres (85 ft)	30951	D7302.1	10
Al Khawtamah Lighthouse		2006	Al Khawtamah Island; 15°41′14.8″N 42°17′08.3″E	inactive	12 metres (39 ft) tower	n/a	ex-E6144.5	n/a
Mukalla South Breakwater Lighthouse		~2009	Mukalla; 14°31′16.9″N 49°08′50.2″E	Fl W 5s.	17 metres (56 ft)	30920	D7312	15
Balfe Point Lighthouse	Image	n/a	Perim; 12°39′38.3″N 43°23′19.9″E	Fl W 4s.	13 metres (43 ft)	30896	D7300.9	11
Balhaf Lighthouse		n/a	Balhaf; 13°58′54.0″N 48°11′14.0″E	Fl W 5s.	90 metres (300 ft)	30923	D7311.23	20
Dawharab Lighthouse		n/a	Dawharab; 16°19′23.8″N 41°58′04.1″E	Fl W 4s.	15 metres (49 ft)	30784	D7300	10
Elephant's Back Lighthouse		1909	Aden; 12°45′52.4″N 44°59′09.6″E	Fl WR 2.5s.	57 metres (187 ft)	30940	D7308	24
Jabal al-Tair Lighthouse	Image	1989	Jabal al-Tair Island; 15°32′18.7″N 41°49′30.1″E	inactive	n/a	ex-30792	ex-E6140	n/a
Jaza'ir az Zubayr Lighthouse	Image	1987	Zubair Islands; 15°00′54.3″N 42°09′51.2″E	Fl W 10s.	154 metres (505 ft)	30829	D7300.61	12
Jazirat al Hanish Lighthouse	Image	2005	Hanish Islands; ~ 13°39′36.6″N 42°40′45.1″E	Fl W 5s.	200 metres (660 ft)	n/a	D7300.84	n/a
Jazirat Salil Lighthouse	Image	n/a	Aden; 12°44′19.5″N 44°55′01.6″E	Fl (2) R 15s.	20 metres (66 ft)	30948	D7301	3
Jebel Yemen Lighthouse	Image	~1970	Kamaran; 15°17′19.6″N 42°34′56.0″E	Fl (3) W 15s.	40 metres (130 ft)	30800	D7300.58	10
Mayyun High Lighthouse		n/a	Perim; 12°39′17.6″N 43°25′52.8″E	Fl (4) W 15s.	85 metres (279 ft)	30900	D7300.95	24
Mocha Range Rear Lighthouse	Image	n/a	Mocha; 13°18′32.0″N 43°14′12.2″E	Iso W 2s.	n/a	30848	D7300.861	9
Nishtun Lighthouse		n/a	Nishtun; 15°49′14.1″N 52°11′57.9″E	Fl W 9s.	42 metres (138 ft)	30904	D7313	18
Ra's Marbut	Image	n/a	Aden; 12°47′25.1″N 44°58′12.8″E	L Fl G 5s.	20 metres (66 ft)	30944	D7309	10
Ra's Marshaq Lighhtouse	Image	1867	Aden; 12°45′48.0″N 45°03′14.4″E	Oc W 5s.	74 metres (243 ft)	30936	D7304	24

== See also ==
- Lists of lighthouses and lightvessels
