= List of lighthouses and lightvessels in Belgium =

This is a list of lighthouses and lightvessels in Belgium.

== Lighthouses ==
Name	Image	Region	Location Coordinates	Year built	Notes
Blankenberge Lighthouse		Flanders	Blankenberge; 51°18′45.3″N 3°06′52.1″E	1952	The tower has a U-shaped cross-section. It is attached to a maritime museum.
Heist Range Rear Light		Flanders	Heist, Zeebrugge; 51°20′15.2″N 3°13′49.3″E	1907	This tower used to serve in a range of leading lights until 1983.
Heist Range Front Light		Flanders	Heist, Zeebrugge; 51°20′22.2″N 3°13′38.5″E	1912	This tower used to serve in a range of leading lights until 1983.
Lange Nelle Lighthouse		Flanders	Ostend; 51°14′10.8″N 2°55′49.7″E	1949	In 1994, the tower was painted with two blue waves on white ground.
Nieuwpoort Lighthouse		Flanders	Nieuwpoort; 51°09′16.8″N 2°43′47.9″E	1949	A lighthouse called Vierboet was established in downtown Nieuwpoort already in 1284. It got a lantern in 1863 and was eventually destroyed in World War I. The current lighthouse is the successor to a tower from 1926.
West-Hinder I		Offshore	30 kilometres (19 mi) northwest of Nieuwpoort; 51°07′28.6″N 4°17′27.2″E	1950	The lightvessel in a series of three used in the West-Hinder shoal off Nieuwpoort. It was decommissioned in 1972 and sold in 1976. While being used as a floating restaurant in Ostend, it sank at its berth in 1978 but could be refloated. In the 1980s, it was sold for scrap but was eventually saved. It was towed to Rupelmonde in 2002 where it can be visited.
West-Hinder II		Offshore	30 kilometres (19 mi) northwest of Nieuwpoort; 51°20′03.9″N 3°12′29.5″E	1950	This lightvessel was decommissioned in 1994. It is now berthed on dry land in a theme park at the Zeebrugge water front.
West-Hinder III		Offshore	30 kilometres (19 mi) northwest of Nieuwpoort; 51°13′46.5″N 4°24′16.3″E	1950	This lightvessel was heavily damaged in 1960 in a collision with the Norwegian tanker Branita. On its way to Ostend for repair, the lightvessel sank, but could be salvaged and resumed duty. It was decommissioned in 1992, and donated to the city of Antwerp in 1995.
Westhinder Lighthouse		Offshore	30 kilometres (19 mi) northwest of Nieuwpoort; 51°23′00″N 2°26′00″E	1992 (c.)	This fixed installation replaced the Westhinder lightvessels around 1992.
Zeebrugge Old Mole Lighthouse		Flanders	Zeebrugge; 51°20′51.5″N 3°12′10.8″E	1905	In World War I, the lighthouse was heavily damaged during the British Zeebrugge Raid in 1918.

== See also ==
- Lists of lighthouses and lightvessels
