= List of lighthouses in Samoa =

This is a list of lighthouses in Samoa.

== Lighthouses ==
Name	Image	Year built	Location & coordinates	Class of Light	Focal height	NGA number	Admiralty number	Range nml
Apia East Breakwater Lighthouse	Image	n/a	Apia; 13°49′27.9″S 171°45′46.6″W	Fl W 4s.	9 metres (30 ft)	3118	K4600	5
Apia Range Front Lighthouse	Image	1888 est.	Apia; 13°49′46.0″S 171°45′57.3″W	Fl G	16 metres (52 ft)	3112	K4598	10
Apia Range Rear Lighthouse		1888 est.	Apia; 13°50′30.9″S 171°46′08.7″W	Fl W 3s.	67 metres (220 ft)	3116	K4598.1	20
Apia Wharf Lighthouse		n/a	Apia; 13°49′42.3″S 171°46′11.5″E	Fl R 4s.	3 metres (9.8 ft)	3120	K4603	3
Apolima Lighthouse		n/a	Apolima; 13°49′12.9″S 172°09′15.4″W	Fl (3) W 10s.	85 metres (279 ft)	3140	K4614	20
Fanuatapu Lighthouse		n/a	Fanuatapu; 14°00′46.2″S 171°24′00.6″W	Fl W 5s.	64 metres (210 ft)	3108	K4594	20
Malua Lighthouse		n/a	Afega; 13°46′09.9″S 171°50′32.0″W	Fl W 6s.	3 metres (9.8 ft)	3128	K4608	10
Mulifanua Range Front Lighthouse		n/a	Mulifanua; 13°48′49.1″S 172°02′21.6″W	L Fl W 8s.	5 metres (16 ft)	3132	K4612	6
Salelologa Range Front Lighthouse		n/a	Salelologa; 13°45′00.0″S 172°12′00.0″W (NGA)	Fl W 2s.	6 metres (20 ft)	3144	K4620	6
Salelologa Range Rear Lighthouse	Image	n/a	Salelologa; 13°44′36.0″S 172°12′36.0″W (NGA)	Iso E 4s.	8 metres (26 ft)	3148	K4620.1	6

== See also ==
- Lists of lighthouses and lightvessels
