= List of lighthouses in the Comoros =

This is a list of lighthouses in Comoros.

== Lighthouses ==
Name	Image	Year built	Location & coordinates	Class of light	Focal height	NGA number	Admiralty number	Range nml
Cap Douamougno		n/a	12°41′10.9″S 45°06′13.4″E	Iso WRG 4s.	109 metres (358 ft)	32777	D6891	10
Ilot Dzaoudzi West Jetty		n/a	12°46′58.9″S 45°15′14.0″E	Fl (2) G 6s.	7 metres (23 ft)	32760	D6896	7
Mamutzu Jetty Lighthouse		n/a	12°46′41.9″S 45°13′58.0″E	Fl (4) R	4 metres (13 ft)	32776	D6898	7
Moroni Lighthouse		n/a	11°42′13.2″S 43°15′05.2″E	Q W	26 metres (85 ft)	32752	D6902	10
Suadzu Islet Range Rear Lighthouse		1904	11°42′08.2″S 43°15′07.3″E	Q R	21 metres (69 ft)	32748	D6904.1	7
Vigie Lighthouse		1903	12°10′06.0″S 44°23′54.0″E	Q W	84 metres (276 ft)	32732	D6882.1	5
West Island Lighthouse		n/a	9°24′08.3″S 46°12′28.5″E	Fl W 2s.	17 metres (56 ft)	32778	D6879	12

== See also ==
- Lists of lighthouses and lightvessels
