= List of lighthouses in Fiji =

This is a list of lighthouses in the Fiji. Some places are in the West longitude.

== Lighthouses ==
Name	Year built	Location & coordinates	Class of Light	Focal height (metres)	NGA number	Admiralty number	Range (nml)
Batiki Island Lighthouse		Batiki	Fl W 4.5s	35	111-3316	K4732	16
Beqa Island Lighthouse		Beqa	Fl(3) W 12s	12	111-3472	K4694	15
Cape Undu Lighthouse	1912	Vanua Levu	Fl(2) W 25s	49	111-3268	K4748	17
Cape Washington Lighthouse	1902	Kadavu Island	Fl W 5s	63	111-3480	K4662	11
Kia Island Lighthouse		Vanua Levu	Fl W 5s	70	111-3284	K4746.5	15
Korolevu Lighthouse	1902	Lomaiviti Islands	Fl(2) W 10s	62	111-3292	K4740	18
Levuka Entrance Lighthouse		Levuka	Fl W 2s	9	111-3352	K4723	5
Malau Lighthouse		Vanua Levu	F R	27	111-3272	K4747	
Momi Bay Range Front Lighthouse	1911	Viti Levu	Iso R 2s	13	111-3432	K4704	15
Momi Bay Range Rear Lighthouse	2012	Viti Levu	Iso R 2s	63	111-3436	K4704.1	15
Na Tumbari Range Front Lighthouse	1898	Levuka	F Bu	15	111-3336	K4722	7
Naikorokoro Lighthouse	1916		Fl(2) W 6s	13	111-3440	K4710	10
Nasilai Reef Lighthouse	1886	Viti Levu	L Fl (2) W 30s	14	111-3368	K4668	12
Navula Reef Lighthouse	1886	Viti Levu	Fl R 3s	11	111-3424	K4702	5
North Ovalau Island Lighthouse		Ovalau	Fl(3) W 10s	8	111-3332	K4719	10
Point Reef Lighthouse		Vanua Levu	Fl W 3s	8	111-3276	K4744	10
Qelelevu Lighthouse		Qelelevu	Fl(2) W 12s	33	111-3264	K4756	15
Solo Rock Lighthouse	1888	Great Astrolabe Reef	L Fl W 30s	29	111-3476	K4666	10
Suva East Reef Lighthouse		Suva	Oc Bu 5s	11	111-3404	K4678	10
Suva North Entrance Range Front Lighthouse	1880	Suva	Oc Bu 5s	40	111-3396	K4672	15
Suva North Entrance Range Rear Lighthouse	1880	Suva	Oc Bu 5s	103	111-3400	K4672.1	15
Suva West Reef Lightouse		Suva	Fl R 3s	9	111-3412	K4676	5
Taveuni Lighthouse		Taveuni	L Fl W 8s	10	111-3288	K4750	10
Totoya Lighthouse		Totoya	Fl(3) W 10s	76	111-3488	K4758	20
Vanuatambu Lighthouse		Kadavu Island	Fl W 2s	50	111-3484	K4663	15
Vatoa Lighthouse		Vatoa	Fl W 5s	70	111-3492	K4759	21
Vatulele Lighthouse	1953	Vatulele	Fl W 10s	41	111-3464	K4661	17
Viwa Lighthouse		Lauwaki	Fl(3) W 15s	17	111-3460	K4714	12
Wailagi Lala Lighthouse	1909	Wailagi Lala	Fl W 5s	29	111-3260	K4752	13
Wakaya Reefs Lighthouse	1902	Wakaya Island	Fl(2) W 15s	23	111-3312	K4730	19

== See also ==
- Lists of lighthouses and lightvessels
