= List of lighthouses in Monaco =

This is a list of lighthouses in Monaco.

== Lighthouses ==
Name	Image	Year built	Location & coordinates	Class of Light	Focal height	NGA number	Admiralty number	Range nml
Cap d’Ail Jetèe du Sud Lighthouse		n/a	43°43′23.8″N 7°24′54.9″E	Fl G 4s.	11 metres (36 ft)	7256	E0838.4	10
Fontevielle Jetèe du Sud Lighthouse		n/a	43°43′41.0″N 7°25′29.9″E	Fl (2) R 6s.	10 metres (33 ft)	7244	E0839	10
Port Hercule Contre-Jetèe Lighthouse		2006	43°44′11.0″N 7°25′47.6″E	Fl (3) G 15s.	12 metres (39 ft)	n/a	E0844	n/a
Port Hercule Contre-Jetèe de l’Avant Port Lighthouse		2006	43°44′11.1″N 7°25′54.6″E	Fl (3) R 15s.	23 metres (75 ft)	n/a	E0843	n/a

== See also ==
- Lists of lighthouses and lightvessels
