= List of lighthouses in Syria =

This is a list of lighthouses in Syria.

== Lighthouses ==
Name	Image	Year built	Location & coordinates	Class of Light	Focal height	NGA number	Admiralty number	Range nml
Baniyas Lighthouse	Image	n/a	Baniyas; 35°08′49.0″N 35°55′16.7″E	Fl (3) WR 17s.	98 metres (322 ft)	21032	E5923.5	white:16 red: 12
El Burj Lighthouse		n/a	Latakia; 35°30′51.7″N 35°46′07.2″E	Fl (2) W 9s.	22 metres (72 ft)	21006	E5921.4	10
Jableh East Breakwater Lighthouse		n/a	Jableh; 35°21′38.1″N 35°55′07.8″E	Q R	6 metres (20 ft)	21016	E5922.2	5
Jableh West Breakwater Lighthouse		n/a	Jableh; 35°21′38.7″N 35°55′05.5″E	Q G	7 metres (23 ft)	21012	E5922	4
Jazirat Arwad		1864 est.	Arwad; 34°51′24.5″N 35°51′26.0″E	Fl W 5s.	20 metres (66 ft)	21044	N5924	12
Latakia Breakwater Lighthouse		n/a	Latakia; 35°31′56.6″N 35°45′18.2″E	L Fl G 4s.	4 metres (13 ft)	21004	E5921.6	5
Latakia Range Front Lighthouse		n/a	Latakia; 35°31′47.3″N 35°46′07.4″E	Fl (2) R 5s.	n/a	21005	E5921.5	6
Latakia Range Rear Lighthouse	Image	n/a	Latakia; 35°31′40.5″N 35°46′25.4″E	Fl (2) R 5s.	n/a	21005.1	E5921.51	6
Ra's al-Bassit Lighthouse		n/a	Ras al-Bassit; 35°51′01.1″N 35°48′36.2″E	Fl W 4s.	75 metres (246 ft)	20988	E5919	14
Ra's al Fasuri Lighthouse		n/a	Burj Islam; 35°40′21.8″N 35°46′17.6″E	Q (3) W 5s.	74 metres (243 ft)	20992	E5919.4	5
Ra's Ibn Hani Lighthouse		1864 est.	Ras Ibn Hani; 35°35′08.7″N 35°43′02.1″E	Fl W 5s.	18 metres (59 ft)	20996	E5920	12
Tartus East Breakwater Lighthouse		n/a	Tartus; 34°54′34.5″N 35°51′33.4″E	Fl R 4s.	7 metres (23 ft)	21040	N5923.8	5
Tartus West Breakwater Lighthouse		n/a	Tartus; 34°54′36.4″N 35°51′16.2″E	Fl G 4s.	n/a	21039	N5923.7	5

== See also ==
- Lists of lighthouses and lightvessels
