= List of lighthouses in Greenland =

This is a list of lighthouses in Greenland.

== Lighthouses ==
Name	Image	Year built	Location & coordinates	Class of Light	Focal height	NGA number	Admiralty number	Range nml
Prince Christians Sund Lighthouse	Image	1975	Prince Christian Sound; 60°03′30.0″N 43°09′30.0″W	Fl WRG 5s.	90 metres (300 ft)	0008	L5100	white: 14 red: 11 green: 11
Sardlog Lighthouse		1975	Qaqortoq; 60°32′33.7″N 46°01′56.7″W	Fl (3) WRG 10s.	20 metres (66 ft)	0092	L5226	white: 8 red: 6 green: 6
Paggisvik Lighthouse	Image	1977	Qaqortoq; 60°37′27.1″N 46°11′25.8″W	Fl (2) WRG 10s.	40 metres (130 ft)	0096	L5228	white: 8 red: 6 green: 6
Pardit Lighthouse	Image	1950	Qaqortoq; 60°41′25.0″N 46°11′42.4″W	Fl WRG 3s.	27 metres (89 ft)	0100	L5230	white: 8 red: 6 green: 6
Qaqortoq Range Front Lighthouse	Image	n/a	Qaqortoq; 60°43′06.0″N 46°02′08.9″W	Iso R 2s.	25 metres (82 ft)	0116	L5238	5
Qaqortoq Range Front Lighthouse	Image	n/a	Qaqortoq; 60°43′07.2″N 46°02′09.3″W	Iso R 4s.	29 metres (95 ft)	0120	L5238.1	5
Kilagtoq Lighthouse	Image	1975	Qaqortoq; 60°43′50.9″N 46°13′31.5″W	Fl WRG 5s.	7 metres (23 ft)	0104	L5232	white: 8 red: 5 green: 5
Inugsugtut Lighthouse		1977	Qassimiut; 60°43′04.6″N 46°59′05.1″W	Fl (3) WRG 10s.	40 metres (130 ft)	0156	L5266	white: 8 red: 5 green: 5
Qajartalik Lighthouse		1950	Qassimiut; 61°09′49.3″N 48°31′18.8″W	Fl (2) WRG 5s.	27 metres (89 ft)	0160	L5270	white: 7 red: 4 green: 4
Sãtuarssugssuaq Lighthouse		1950	Paamiut; 61°57′58.1″N 49°45′09.9″W	Fl (3) W 10s.	20 metres (66 ft)	0228	L5346	7
Fiskenaes Fjord Lighthouse	Image	1978	Nuuk; 63°01′37.9″N 50°49′34.9″W	Fl WRG 3s.	20 metres (66 ft)	0248	L5400	white: 7 red: 5 green: 5
Satut Lighthouse		1957	Nuuk; 63°41′49.8″N 51°36′13.0″W	Fl WRG 5s.	21 metres (69 ft)	0252	L5500	white: 8 red: 4 green: 4
Tukingassarassuak Lighthouse		n/a	Nuuk; 64°00′11.0″N 51°41′57.8″W	Fl WRG 3s.	12 metres (39 ft)	0292	L5525	white: 5 red: 4 green: 4
Agtorssuit Lighthouse		1964	Nuuk; 64°05′04.0″N 52°07′02.6″W	Fl (2) WRG 5s.	26 metres (85 ft)	0304	L550	white: 9 red: 6 green: 6
Renso Lighthouse		n/a	Nuuk; 64°07′14.0″N 51°56′50.6″W	Fl W 5s.	12 metres (39 ft)	0308	L5552	10
Kitdliaraq Lighthouse		1950	Maniitsoq; 65°21′34.6″N 52°49′56.1″W	Fl (3) W 10s.	21 metres (69 ft)	0332	L5580	9
Sukkertoppen Lighthouse	Image	1988	Maniitsoq; 65°25′16.6″N 52°52′49.4″W	Oc WRG 5s.	30 metres (98 ft)	0336	L5590	white: 7 red: 4 green: 4
Qeqertarssuatsiaq Lighthouse		1977	Sisimiut; 66°30′25.0″N 53°41′11.1″W	Fl WRG 5s.	42 metres (138 ft)	0380	L5640	white: 8 red: 6 green: 5
Annertusoq Lighthouse		1950	Sisimiut; 66°55′10.5″N 53°44′42.6″W	Fl W 3s.	37 metres (121 ft)	0384	L5660	7
Ukîvik Lighthouse		1977	Sisimiut; 67°13′05.6″N 53°54′39.9″W	Fl W 5s.	90 metres (300 ft)	0424	L5718	6
Kangatsiag Lighthouse		n/a	Kangaatsiaq; 68°18′30.1″N 53°27′32.2″W	Oc WRG 5s.	20 metres (66 ft)	0428	L5790	white: 7 red: 4 green: 4
Killiit Lighthouse		1950	Aasiaat; 68°37′24.2″N 53°32′10.7″W	Fl (2) W 5s.	45 metres (148 ft)	0436	L5800	7
Zimmers Ø Lighthouse		1950	Aasiaat; 68°45′08.4″N 52°47′49.7″W	Fl WRG 3s.	18 metres (59 ft)	0456	L5892	white: 7 red: 4 green: 4
Napissaq Lighthouse		1995	Qasigiannguit; 68°48′30.8″N 51°13′21.6″W	Fl WRG 3s.	9 metres (30 ft)	0560	L5936	white: 6 red: 4 green: 4
Qaqqaliaq Lighthouse	Image	1978	Qeqertarsuaq; 69°13′55.4″N 53°33′24.4″W	Oc WRG 10s.	40 metres (130 ft)	0508	L5918	white: 15 red: 11 green: 11

== See also ==
- Lists of lighthouses and lightvessels
