= List of lighthouses in Saint Vincent and the Grenadines =

This is a list of lighthouses in Saint Vincent and the Grenadines.

== Lighthouses ==
Name	Image	Year built	Location & coordinates	Class of Light	Focal height	NGA number	Admiralty number	Range nml
Brigton Lighthouse		n/a	Saint George Parish; 13°07′30.0″N 61°10′06.0″W	Fl W 4s.	36 metres (118 ft)	15072	J5815.4	8
Dark Head Lighthouse		n/a	Saint David Parish; 13°17′12.1″N 61°15′36.6″W	Fl W 5s.	103 metres (338 ft)	15080	J5818	12
Duvernette Island Lighthouse		n/a	Saint George Parish; 13°07′41.7″N 61°12′14.5″W	V Q (2) W 2s.	70 metres (230 ft)	15068	J5816	6
Fort Charlotte Lighthouse		n/a	Saint Andrew Parish; 13°09′27.6″N 61°14′31.3″W	Fl (3) W 20s.	195 metres (640 ft)	15064	J5817	16
Owia Lighthouse		n/a	Charlotte Parish; 13°22′39.1″N 61°08′32.0″W	Fl W 10s.	36 metres (118 ft)	15076	J5815	8
West Cay Lighthouse		n/a	Bequia; 12°59′26.1″N 61°17′28.6″W	Fl W 10s.	13 metres (43 ft)	15160	J5819	8

== See also ==
- Lists of lighthouses and lightvessels
