= List of lighthouses in Ivory Coast =

This is a list of lighthouses in Ivory Coast.

== Lighthouses ==
Name	Image	Year built	Location & coordinates	Class of light	Focal height	NGA number	Admiralty number	Range nml
Adjué Lighthouse		n/a	5°11′21.70″N 4°32′18.10″W (NGA)	Fl W 4s.	49 metres (161 ft)	24798	D3126	15
Canal de Vridi Jetée Nord Lighthouse		1950s	5°15′1.19″N 4°00′6.77″W	Iso G 4s.	16 metres (52 ft)	24812	D 3129	11
Canal de Vridi Jetée Sud Lighthouse		1950s	5°14′44.52″N 4°00′08.60″W	Oc (2) R 6s.	16 metres (52 ft)	24804	D3128	11
Grand-Bassam Lightouse		1915	5°12′18.6″N 3°43′53.9″W	Fl W 5s.	32 metres (105 ft)	24843	D3137.5	18
Grand Lahou Lighthouse		1901 est.	5°08′12.0″N 5°01′12.0″W (NGA)	Fl (2+1) W 15s.	13 metres (43 ft)	24796	D3125	15
Pointe Tafou Lighthouse		1908	4°24′33.5″N 7°21′27.2″W	Fl (3) W 15s.	25 metres (82 ft)	24764	D3118	20
Port Bouët Lighthouse		1930s	5°15′03.4″N 3°57′28.3″W	Fl (3) W 14s.	34 metres (112 ft)	24840	D3127	28
San Pédro Lighthouse		n/a	4°45′05.0″N 6°36′06.8″W	Fl W 4s.	106 metres (348 ft)	24768	D3120	13
Sassandra Lighthouse		1908	4°56′53.4″N 6°04′54.0″W	Oc W 4s.	60 metres (200 ft)	24788	D3122	16
Treitchville Lighthouse		n/a	5°18′19.3″N 4°00′58.3″W	Fl (2+1) G 12s.	41 metres (135 ft)	24836	D3135	10

== See also ==
- List of lighthouses in Liberia (to the west)
- List of lighthouses in Ghana (to the east)
- Lists of lighthouses and lightvessels
