= List of lighthouses in Jordan =

This is a list of lighthouses in Jordan.

== Lighthouses ==
| Name | Image | Year built | Location & coordinates | Class of Light | Focal height | NGA number | Admiralty number | Range nml |
|---|---|---|---|---|---|---|---|---|
| Aqaba Harbour Control Lighthouse | | 1991 | Aqaba; 29°30′49.4″N 34°59′49.4″E | Fl (3) W 10s. | 72 metres (236 ft) | 30452 | D7298.2 | 17 |
| Aqaba Flagpole Light | | 2004 | Aqaba; 29°31′17.3″N 35°00′02.8″E | Fl R | 43 metres (141 ft) | | ex-E6044.2 | n/a |
| Ayla Marina East Breakwater Lighthouse | | n/a | Aqaba; 29°32′22.9″N 34°58′49.7″E | F G | 7 metres (23 ft) | 30450 | D7298.01 | 3 |
| Ayla Marina West Breakwater Lighthouse | | n/a | Aqaba; 29°32′23.0″N 34°58′46.2″E | F R | 7 metres (23 ft) | 30451 | D7298.02 | 3 |
| Royal Jordanian Navy Base North Lighthouse | | n/a | Aqaba; 29°23′48.2″N 34°57′54.4″E | Fl R 2s. | 3 metres (9.8 ft) | 30462 | D7298.24 | n/a |
| Royal Jordanian Navy Base South Lighthouse | | n/a | Aqaba; 29°23′47.4″N 34°57′51.8″E | Fl R 2s. | 3 metres (9.8 ft) | 30462.1 | D7298.245 | n/a |
| Royal Yacht Club North Jetty Lighthouse | | 2014 | Aqaba; 29°31′45.7″N 34°59′53.4″E | Fl R | 7 metres (23 ft) | 30454 | D7298.15 | n/a |
| Royal Yacht Club South Jetty Lighthouse | | 2014 | Aqaba; 29°31′44.2″N 34°59′51.9″E | Q G | 7 metres (23 ft) | 30455 | D7298.1 | n/a |

== See also ==
- Lists of lighthouses and lightvessels
