= List of lighthouses in Christmas Island =

This is a list of lighthouses in Kiritimati (Christmas Island).

== Lighthouses ==
Name	Image	Year built	Location & coordinates	Class of Light	Focal height	NGA number	Admiralty number	Range nml
Christmas Island Lighthouse		n/a	Kiritimati (Christmas Island); 2°02′41.4″N 157°26′44.6″W	F R	39 metres (128 ft)	11100	M5836	17

== See also ==
- Lists of lighthouses and lightvessels
