= List of lighthouses in Abkhazia =

This is a list of lighthouses in Abkhazia.

== Lighthouses ==
Name	Year built	Location & coordinates	Class of light	Focal height (metres)	NGA number	Admiralty number	Range (nml)
Bambora Lighthouse	1886	Gudauta	Fl W 3s	38	113-19200	E5721	16
Eshera Lighthouse		Sukhumi	L Fl W 6s	33	113-19209	E5725	14
Gagrinskiy Lighthouse			Fl(2) W 5s	87	113-19172	E5706	18
Mys Kodori Lighthouse	1899	Sukhumi District	Fl R 5s	23	113-19288	E5784	13
Mys Pitsunda Lighthouse		Pitsunda	Fl(2) W 10.2s	36	113-19192	E5716	19
Mys Sukhumskiy Lighthouse	1864	Sukhumi District	L Fl (2) W 15s	37	113-19212	E5728	17
Novy Afon Lighthouse		Novyy Afon	Oc W 6s	33	113-19206	E5724.5	10
Sukhumi Middle Pier Range Front Lighthouse		Sukhumi	F G	14	113-19214	E5727	3

== See also ==
- Lists of lighthouses and lightvessels
