= List of lighthouses in Bahrain =

This is a list of lighthouses in Bahrain.

== Lighthouses ==
Name	Image	Year built	Location & coordinates	Class of light	Focal height	NGA number	Admiralty number	Range nml
Bahrain Yacht Club Lighthouse		n/a	Sitrah; 26°06′49.0″N 50°38′05.4″E	Q W	10 metres (33 ft)	29737	D7409.5	5
Kawkab Umm al Sawali Lighthouse	Image	n/a	Al Hidd; 26°13′17.0″N 50°40′55.5″E	F R	45 metres (148 ft)	29707	D7400.9	10
Khalifa Port Breakwater Lighthouse		n/a	Al Hidd; 26°10′40.7″N 50°42′50.5″E	F G	6 metres (20 ft)	29709	D7400.95	5
Mina Salman Lighthouse		n/a	Umm Al Hassam; 26°12′08.1″N 50°36′37.2″E	F WRG	42 metres (138 ft)	29764	D7406	n/a

== See also ==
- Lists of lighthouses and lightvessels
