= List of lighthouses in Antigua and Barbuda =

This is a list of lighthouses in Antigua and Barbuda.

== Active lighthouses ==
Name	Image	Year built	Coordinates	Class of light	Tower height	ARLHS identifier	Admiralty number	Range nml
Sandy Island Lighthouse		2007	Sandy Island offshore St. John's; 17°08′03.5″N 61°55′34.3″W	Fl W 10s.	16 metres (52 ft)	ANT-001	J5690	10
Pillar Rock Lighthouse	Image	n/a	St. John's; 17°07′42.5″N 61°52′45.7″W	Fl G 4s.	32 metres (105 ft)	ANT-002	J5694	5
Fort James Lighthouse	Image	n/a	Fort James peninsula, St. John's; 17°07′49.8″N 61°51′50.1″W	Fl G			J5696	

== Inactive lighthouses ==
Name	Image	Year built	Coordinates	Tower height	Remarks
St. John's Lighthouse		1905	City of St. John's; 17°07′03.8″N 61°50′22.9″W	12 metres (39 ft)	Building was intended as a lighthouse but never activated. Function is nowadays given by a pair of Leading lights.

== See also ==
- Lists of lighthouses and lightvessels
