= List of lighthouses in Wallis and Futuna =

This is a list of lighthouses in Wallis and Futuna.

== Lighthouses ==
Name	Image	Year built	Location & coordinates	Class of light	Focal height	NGA number	Admiralty number	Range nml
Honikulu Pass Range Front Lighthouse	Image	n/a	Nukuatea Island; 13°22′48.8″S 176°12′39.9″W	F Bu	8 metres (26 ft)	3152	K4760	3
Honikulu Pass Range Rear Lighthouse	Image	n/a	Wallis; 13°20′29.9″S 176°11′20.3″W	Iso W 4s.	98 metres (322 ft)	3152.1	K4760.1	8

== See also ==
- Lists of lighthouses and lightvessels
