= List of lighthouses in Sint Maarten =

This is a list of lighthouses in Sint Maarten.

== Lighthouses ==
Name	Image	Year built	Location & coordinates	Class of Light	Focal height	NGA number	Admiralty number	Range nml
Philipsburg Wathey Pier Light		n/a	Philipsburg; 18°00′29.2″N 63°02′55.8″W	Fl (6) + L Fl W 10s.	n/a	14727.5	J5862.5	7

== See also ==
- Lists of lighthouses and lightvessels
