= List of lighthouses in Grenada =

This is a list of lighthouses in Grenada.

== Lighthouses ==
Name	Image	Year built	Location & coordinates	Class of Light	Focal height	NGA number	Admiralty number	Range nml
Battowia Island Lighthouse		n/a	Saint Patrick Parish; 12°57′51.2″N 61°07′47.7″W	Fl (2) W 20s.	216 metres (709 ft)	15152	J5819.4	8
Catholic Island Lighthouse		n/a	Saint Patrick Parish; 12°39′40.2″N 61°24′05.8″W	Fl (2) W 20s.	44 metres (144 ft)	15136	J5821.8	8
Glover Island Lighthouse		n/a	Saint George Parish; 11°59′09.0″N 61°47′14.7″W	Q (6) + L Fl W 15s.	6 metres (20 ft)	15162	J5830.5	7
Miss Irene Point Lighthouse		n/a	Saint Patrick Parish; 12°35′29.5″N 61°27′26.8″W	Fl (2) W 20s.	125 metres (410 ft)	15151.7	J5822.4	8
Petit Cabrits Lighthouse	Image	n/a	Morne Rouge; 12°00′59.4″N 61°46′31.3″W	Fl (2+1) W 20s.	108 metres (354 ft)	15174	J5830.2	18
Prickly Point Lighthouse	image	n/a	St. George's; 11°59′17.4″N 61°45′38.6″W	F R	30 metres (98 ft)	15161	J5830.3	n/a
St. George's Harbor Lighthouse	Image	1890s.	St. George's; 12°02′56.5″N 61°45′14.7″W	F R	57 metres (187 ft)	15176	J5834	15

== See also ==
- Lists of lighthouses and lightvessels
