= List of lighthouses in the United Arab Emirates =

This is a list of lighthouses in United Arab Emirates.

== Lighthouses ==
Name	Image	Year built	Location & coordinates	Class of Light	Focal height	NGA number	Admiralty number	Range nml
Al Mina Lighthouse	Image	n/a	Mina Zayed; 24°32′1.8″N 54°22′59.9″E	Iso W 6s.	70 metres (230 ft)	30021	D7363.08	17
Dhadna Lighthouse		n/a	Dhadna; 25°31′13.6″N 56°21′56.0″E	Q R	36 metres (118 ft)	28558	D7332.3	n7a
Dibba East Breakwater Lighthouse		n/a	Dibba Al-Fujairah; 25°36′56.1″N 56°17′47.6″E	Oc R 2.5s.	13 metres (43 ft)	28556	D7333	9
Dibba West Breakwater Lighthouse		n/a	Dibba Al-Fujairah; 25°36′45.5″N 56°17′40.1″E	Fl G 5s.	9 metres (30 ft)	28556.2	D7334	5
Fujairah Lighthouse	Image	2011	Fujairah; 25°11′56.5″N 56°20′16.8″E	Fl W 2s.	273 metres (896 ft)	28570	D7329.1	30
Kalba Lighthouse		n/a	Kalba; 25°04′53.6″N 56°21′49.8″E	Fl (2) R 10s.	5 metres (16 ft)	28586	D7327	5
Khor Bateen East Breakwater Lighthouse		n/a	Abu Dhabi; 24°28′00.7″N 54°18′08.5″E	Fl W 3s.	n/a	30044	D7364.2	n/a
Khor Bateen West Breakwater Lighthouse		n/a	Abu Dhabi; 24°28′37.5″N 54°17′58.6″E	Fl W 3s.	n/a	30040	D7364	n/a
Mina Rashid Main Breakwater Lighthouse		n/a	Port Rashid; 25°16′54.7″N 55°15′58.9″E	Fl G 7s.	13 metres (43 ft)	30108	D7355.7	5
Mina Saqr Entrance Lighthouse		n/a	Ghalilah; 25°58′26.7″N 56°02′59.2″E	Oc WRG 3s.	21 metres (69 ft)	30153	D7345.5	white: 12 red: 10 green: 11
Mina Zayeid West Breakwater Lighthouse	Image	n/a	Mina Zayed; 24°32′19.9″N 54°22′59.1″E	Iso Y 6s.	16 metres (52 ft)	30020	D7363	n/a
Murbah Lighthouse		n/a	Murbah; 25°15′43.2″N 56°22′00.3″E	Iso R 2s.	37 metres (121 ft)	28565.5	D7329.8	15
Qarnayn Lighthouse		n/a	Qarnayn Island; 24°56′17.6″N 52°50′52.5″E	Fl W 5s.	59 metres (194 ft)	29868	D7366.6	8
Yasat Ali Lighthouse	Image	2011	Yasat Ali; 24°22′25.5″N 52°00′52.2″E	Fl WR 10s.	30 metres (98 ft)	29814	D7384.65	white: 20 red: 16
Zirku Lighthouse		n/a	Zirku island 24°53′05.4″N 53°04′08.6″E	Fl W 10s.	199 metres (653 ft)	29872	D7366	18

== See also ==
- Lists of lighthouses and lightvessels
