= List of lighthouses in the Solomon Islands =

This is a list of lighthouses in Solomon Islands.

== Lighthouses ==
Name	Image	Year built	Location & coordinates	Class of light	Focal height	NGA number	Admiralty number	Range nml
Auki Harbour Lighthouse		n/a	Auki; 8°46′08.2″S 160°42′10.4″E	L Fl WR 5s.	97 metres (318 ft)	10700	K4901	white. 15 red: 12
Cape Esperance Lighthouse		n/a	Cape Esperance; 9°15′12.7″S 159°42′54.0″E	Fl W 10s.	10 metres (33 ft)	10652	K4932	10
Gizo Island Lighthouse		n/a	Gizo; 8°04′06.0″S 156°50′12.0″E	Fl W 5s.	9 metres (30 ft)	10756	K4893.4	5
Indalilau Islet Lighthouse		n/a	offshore Nggela Islands; 9°11′35.4″S 160°21′39.9″E	Fl (2) W 10s.	10 metres (33 ft)	10680	K4906	10
Honiara Anchorage Range Front Lighthouse	Image	n/a	Honiara; 9°25′53.2″S 159°57′34.0″E	Fl R 5s.	13 metres (43 ft)	10636	K4934	4
Honiara Anchorage Range Rear Lighthouse		n/a	Honiara; 9°26′04.7″S 159°57′18.9″E	Fl G 5s.	n/a	10640	K4934.1	4
Kunda Kunda Reef Lighthouse		n/a	Munda; 8°23′00.0″S 157°13′36.0″E (NGA)	Fl W 10s.	10 metres (33 ft)	10732	K4896	10
Munda Range Front Lighthouse		n/a	Munda; 8°22′12.0″S 157°13′48.0″E (NGA)	Fl W 5s.	9 metres (30 ft)	10736	K4896.4	5
Munda Range Rear Lighthouse		n/a	Munda; 8°19′49.9″S 157°14′05.5″E	Fl (3) W 15s.	11 metres (36 ft)	10740	K4896.41	5
Papara Voghoe Point Lighthouse		n/a	Choiseul Island; 4°10′12.0″S 156°52′00.0″E	Fl WRG 10s.	51 metres (167 ft)	10772	K4892	white: 8 red: 5 green: 5
Rere Point Lighthouse		n/a	Mbulo Island; 9°34′42.0″S 160°36′48.0″E (NGA)	Fl W 5s.	10 metres (33 ft)	10608	K4946	5
Russell Islands Lighthouse		n/a	Russell Islands; 8°58′54.5″S 159°14′32.6″E	Fl W 10s.	11 metres (36 ft)	10724	K4920	10
Soghonangola Lighthouse		n/a	Tulagi; 9°07′25.3″S 160°09′22.4″E	Fl (2) R 10s.	10 metres (33 ft)	10665	K4909	3
South Island Lighthouse		n/a	New Georgia; 8°48′53.7″S 157°45′31.3″E	Fl W 10s.	11 metres (36 ft)	10728	K4898	10
Square Island Lighthouse		n/a	Guadalcanal Province; 9°49′23.6″S 160°54′14.1″E	Fl W 10s.	10 metres (33 ft)	10584	K4947	10
Taivu Point Lighthouse		n/a	Guadalcanal Province; 9°24′42.0″S 160°21′00.0″E (NGA)	L Fl (2) W 20s.	10 metres (33 ft)	10616	K4944	5
Tulagi Harbour Range Front Lighthouse		n/a	Tulagi; 9°06′08.3″S 160°10′07.2″E	Fl W 5s.	8 metres (26 ft)	10660	K4908	5
Tulagi Harbour Range Rear Lighthouse		n/a	Tulagi; 9°05′32.4″S 160°10′13.1″E	Fl (2) W 10s.	10 metres (33 ft)	10664	K4908.1	5
Wangalaha Point Lighthouse		n/a	Makira; 10°18′06.8″S 161°35′01.3″E	Fl W 5s.	30 metres (98 ft)	10576	K4947.6	8

== See also ==
- Lists of lighthouses and lightvessels
