= List of lighthouses in the British Indian Ocean Territory =

This is a list of lighthouses in British Indian Ocean Territory.

== Lighthouses ==
| Name | Image | Year built | Location & coordinates | Class of light | Focal height | NGA number | Admiralty number | Range nml |
|---|---|---|---|---|---|---|---|---|
| Control Tower Light | | n/a | Diego Garcia; 7°18′29.8″S 72°24′42.2″E | Al Fl WG 10s. | 40 metres (130 ft) | 33036 | k0800 | 12 |
| Diego Garcia Harbour Control Tower Lighthouse | | ~1980s | Diego Garcia; 7°17′27.8″S 72°23′39.4″E | F R | 13 metres (43 ft) | 33052 | K0806 | n/a |
| Leconte Point Lighthouse | | n/a | Diego Garcia; 7°16′37.9″S 72°28′08.8″E | Fl R 2.5s. | 10 metres (33 ft) | 33060 | K0807 | 3 |
| Minni Minni Lighthouse | Image | 2002 | Diego Garcia; 7°19′36.3″S 72°28′28.4″E | F WRG | 14 metres (46 ft) | 33064 | K0808.5 | white: 20 red: 16 green: 16 |
| Observation Point Lighthouse | | n/a | Diego Garcia; 7°14′19.9″S 72°26′06.1″E | Fl W 4s. | 10 metres (33 ft) | 33056 | K0802 | 5 |
| West Island Lighthouse | | n/a | Diego Garcia; 7°14′51.2″S 72°23′07.3″E | Fl (2) W 5s. | 10 metres (33 ft) | 33040 | K0801 | 6 |

== See also ==
- Lists of lighthouses and lightvessels
