= List of lighthouses in Papua New Guinea =

This is a list of lighthouses in Papua New Guinea.

== Lighthouses ==
Name	Image	Year built	Location & coordinates	Class of light	Focal height	NGA number	Admiralty number	Range nml
Abligini Island Lighthouse		n/a	New Britain; 6°18′20.3″S 150°04′33.0″E	Fl W 10s.	103 metres (338 ft)	10890	K3506.5	10
Adele Island Lighthouse		n/a	Louisiade Archipelago; 11°26′53.7″S 154°23′51.7″E	Fl W 8s.	43 metres (141 ft)	26284	K3450.5	16
Alim Island Lighthouse		n/a	Admiralty Islands; 2°53′39.5″S 147°03′26.1″E	Fl W 5s.	32 metres (105 ft)	10928	K3476	10
Ava Point Lighthouse		n/a	Morobe Province; 10°34′10.8″S 149°52′47.2″E	Fl W 12s.	188 metres (617 ft)	26320	K3456.5	10
Basilisk Passage Lighthouse	Image	n/a	Port Moresby; 9°32′20.2″S 147°08′02.1″E	Fl W 5s.	9 metres (30 ft)	26352	K3458	10
Basilisk Passage Range Front Lighthouse		n/a	Port Moresby; 9°29′53.3″S 147°11′06.2″E	Oc W 4s.	38 metres (125 ft)	26360	K3459	18
Basilisk Passage Range Rear Lighthouse		n/a	Port Moresby; 9°29′47.3″S 147°11′19.3″E	Oc W 6s.	90 metres (300 ft)	26364	K3459.1	10
Boera Head Lightouse	Image	n/a	Port Moresby; 9°23′22.9″S 147°00′51.1″E	Fl W 2.5s.	33 metres (108 ft)	26392	K3563.8	10
Bomatu Point Lighthouse		n/a	Trobriand Islands; 8°24′19.9″S 151°06′46.5″E	Fl (3) W 15s.	31 metres (102 ft)	26416	K3436	10
Bonarua Island Lighthouse		n/a	Bonarua Hili Hili Island; 10°45′18.0″S 150°22′54.0″E (NGA)	Fl (3) W 15s.	209 metres (686 ft)	26316	K3456	10
Bright Island Lighthouse		n/a	Engineer Islands; 10°32′01.2″S 151°12′45.5″E	Fl W 2.5s.	16 metres (52 ft)	26292	K3444	10
Cape Concordia Lighthouse		n/a	Vanimo; 2°40′22.6″S 141°18′15.8″E	Fl W 5s.	68 metres (223 ft)	26130	K3400	10
Cape Cretin Lighthouse		n/a	Nussing Island; ~6°39′20.1″S 147°51′34.0″E	Fl W 6s.	21 metres (69 ft)	26188	K3406	10
Cape Croisilles		n/a	Madang Province; 4°50′51.8″S 145°48′17.1″E	Fl (2) W 6s.	22 metres (72 ft)	26160	K3401.8	10
Cape Gerhard		n/a	Morobe Province; 6°44′48.7″S 147°34′37.9″E	Fl (3) W 12s.	22 metres (72 ft)	26192	K3408	10
Cape Gourdon Lighthouse		n/a	Madang Province; 4°23′09.3″S 145°19′20.0″E	Fl (3) W 9s.	15 metres (49 ft)	26156	K3401.6	10
Cape Hollman		n/a	West New Britain Province; 4°59′30.0″S 150°07′18.0″E	Fl W 6s.	8 metres (26 ft)	10880	K3484	10
Cape Lambert Lighthouse		n/a	4°05′30.0″S 151°31′12.0″E	Fl (3) W 15s.	20 metres (66 ft)	10864	K3492	10
Cape L'Averdy Lighthouse		n/a	Bougainville Island; 5°32′29.0″S 155°03′52.8″E	Fl W 6s.	25 metres (82 ft)	10824	K4884	15
Cape Moem Lighthouse		n/a	Wewak; 3°33′04.3″S 143°42′07.9″E	Fl G 5s.	8 metres (26 ft)	26142	K3400.6	4
Cape Oxford Lighthouse		n/a	East New Britain Province; 5°26′43.5″S 152°05′02.5″E	Fl (3) W 15s.	94 metres (308 ft)	10892	K3506	10
Cape St. George Lighthouse		n/a	New Ireland Province; 4°50′54.0″S 152°52′36.0″E	Fl W 5s.	101 metres (331 ft)	10896	K3514	10
Cape Tawui Lighthouse		n/a	New Britain; 4°08′09.7″S 152°10′11.6″E	Fl W 7.5s.	47 metres (154 ft)	10852	K3494	18
Coast Watchers Lighthouse		1959	Madang; 5°12′44.6″S 145°48′53.4″E	Fl W 15s.	28 metres (92 ft)	26172	K3402	12
Condor Point Lighthouse		n/a	Madang Province; 4°07′08.2″S 144°51′44.5″E	Fl (2) W 8s.	15 metres (49 ft)	26152	K3401.4	10
Hood Point Lighthouse	Image	n/a	Central Province; 10°06′12.0″S 147°43′36.6″E	Q (2) W 8s.	8 metres (26 ft)	26348	K3457	10
Hospital Hill Lighthouse		n/a	Arawa; 6°13′44.3″S 155°34′22.4″E	Fl W 5s.	87 metres (285 ft)	10812	K4884.5	n/a
Idihi Island Lighthouse	Lighthouse at Idihi Island, Papua New Guinea	n/a	Port Moresby; 9°25′39.0″S 146°53′00.3″E	Fl (2) W 5s.	23 metres (75 ft)	26384	K3464	10
Ipoteto Island Lighthouse		n/a	Morobe Province; 9°37′45.2″S 150°01′24.0″E	Fl (2) W 8s.	23 metres (75 ft)	26260	K3432	10
Jomard Islands Lighthouse		n/a	Jomard Islands; 11°15′19.1″S 152°08′08.3″E	Fl W 10s.	24 metres (79 ft)	26276	K3450.3	10
Kegawam Island Lighthouse		n/a	Engineer Islands; 10°21′13.7″S 151°23′06.6″E	Fl W 6s.	8 metres (26 ft)	26264	K3438	10
Kiau Point Lighthouse		n/a	5°12′13.3″S 147°05′33.2″E	Fl W 5s.	23 metres (75 ft)	10888	K3478	10
Kimbe Bay No 12 Lighthouse		n/a	Kimbe Bay; 5°16′32.0″S 150°57′51.0″E	Fl (2) W 10s.	13 metres (43 ft)	10871.7	K3490.32	10
Kitava Island Lighthouse		n/a	Trobriand Islands; 8°38′43.4″S 151°19′52.6″E	Fl W 7.5s.	107 metres (351 ft)	26420	K3437	10
Lunn Island Lighthouse	Image	n/a	Lunn Island; 10°47′12.6″S 152°00′26.2″E	Fl W 4s.	15 metres (49 ft)	26272	K3449	15
Mait Island Lighthouse		n/a	New Ireland Province; 3°00′03.7″S 150°43′35.7″E	Fl W 10s.	79 metres (259 ft)	10900	K3512	10
Madehas Island Lighthouse		n/a	Buka Island; 5°27′37.4″S 154°38′03.7″E	Fl W 10s.	137 metres (449 ft)	10828	K4883	16
Oro Bay Range Front Lighthouse		n/a	Oro Province; 8°54′10.9″S 148°28′22.6″E	Fl W 3s.	119 metres (390 ft)	26220	K3424	18
Oro Bay Range Rear Lighthouse		n/a	Oro Province; 8°54′15.1″S 148°28′14.8″E	Fl W 10s.	133 metres (436 ft)	26224	K3424.1	18
Otua Islet Lighthouse		n/a	Bougainville Island; 6°27′31.1″S 155°58′25.9″E	Fl W 5s.	26 metres (85 ft)	10788	K4886	14
Rabaul Range Front Lighthouse	Image	n/a	Rabaul; 4°11′56.5″S 150°10′07.6″E	Fl W 2s.	28 metres (92 ft)	10844	K3498	10
Rabaul Range Rear Lighthouse	Image	n/a	Rabaul; 4°11′42.0″S 150°10′06.0″E (NGA)	Fl W 5s.	38 metres (125 ft)	10848	K3498.1	7
Rothery Passage Lighthouse		n/a	Central Province; 10°21′04.1″S 148°41′27.8″E	Fl (3) W 15s.	22 metres (72 ft)	26344	K3456.7	10
Seeadler Harbor Lighthouse	Image	n/a	Seeadler Harbor; 1°57′37.8″S 147°19′03.5″E	Fl (4) W 16s.	27 metres (89 ft)	10916	K3507	10
Spear Island Lighthouse	Image	n/a	Oro Province; 8°59′22.4″S 149°08′16.7″E	Fl W 6s.	19 metres (62 ft)	26228	K3426	10
Steffan Strait Lighthouse		n/a	New Ireland Province; 2°42′29.3″S 150°36′48.6″E	Fl (2) W 8s.	13 metres (43 ft)	10904	K3511	10
Strathord Islands Lighthouse		n/a	Strathord Islands; 10°13′19.6″S 151°51′59.4″E	Fl (3) W 12s.	8 metres (26 ft)	26296	K3448	10
Weka Una Rock Lighthouse	Image	n/a	Morobe Province; 10°36′10.3″S 150°36′38.2″E	Fl (2) W 8s.	10 metres (33 ft)	26324	K3455	10
Yule Island Lighthouse		n/a	Yule Island; 8°49′37.5″S 146°32′03.3″E	Fl (3) W 15s.	54 metres (177 ft)	26400	K3465	8

== See also ==
- Lists of lighthouses and lightvessels
