= List of lighthouses in Montenegro =

This is a list of lighthouses in Montenegro.

== Lighthouses ==
Name	Image	Year built	Location & coordinates	Class of Light	Focal height	NGA number	Admiralty number	Range nml
Bar North Breakwater Lighthouse		1872 est.	42°05′48.9″N 19°04′54.7″E	Fl (2) R 5s.	6 metres (20 ft)	14269	E3693	3
Bar West Breakwater Lighthouse		n/a	42°05′56.7″N 19°04′44.0″E	Fl G 4s.	19 metres (62 ft)	14268	E3691	6
Mamula Lighthouse		n/a	42°23′42.0″N 18°33′28.2″E	Fl W 3s.	34 metres (112 ft)	14101	E3622	6
Mendre Lighthouse		1886 est.	41°57′09.5″N 19°08′58.6″E	Fl (3) W 10s.	27 metres (89 ft)	14272	E3696	22
Rt Crni Lighthouse		n/a	42°08′10.6″N 19°00′39.0″E	Fl W 6s.	142 metres (466 ft)	14256	E3689	25
Rt Gospa Lighthouse		n/a	42°28′38.9″N 18°41′24.8″E	Fl G 3s.	7 metres (23 ft)	14184	E3660	4
Rt Opatovo Lighthouse	image	1904	42°27′34.4″N 18°40′53.2″E	Fl G 2s.	9 metres (30 ft)	14168	E3654	4
Rt Platamon Lighthouse		n/a	42°16′03.7″N 18°46′41.7″E	Fl W 10s.	32 metres (105 ft)	14240	E3685	9
Rt Sveti Nedja Lighthouse	image	n/a	42°27′36.0″N 18°40′34.7″E	Fl R 2s.	7 metres (23 ft)	14164	E3652	5
Rt Turski Lighthouse		1910	42°28′42.5″N 18°41′12.2″E	Fl (2) W 5s.	9 metres (30 ft)	14180	E3658	6
Sveti Nikola Lighthouse		1882	42°15′32.4″N 18°51′29.5″E	Fl (3) W 10s.	23 metres (75 ft)	14244	E3686	8
Tunja Lighthouse		n/a	42°24′57.2″N 18°40′40.6″E	Fl (2) WR 5s.	8 metres (26 ft)	14140	E3645	white: 6 red:4
Ulcinj Lightouse		n/a	41°55′20.3″N 19°12′04.8″E	Fl W 3s.	27 metres (89 ft)	14276	E3698	8
Volovica Lighthouse		1879	42°05′17.6″N 19°04′13.1″E	Fl (2) W 10s.	30 metres (98 ft)	14260	E3690	16

== See also ==
- Lists of lighthouses and lightvessels
