= List of lighthouses in Austria =

This is a list of lighthouses in Austria. Although Austria is a landlocked country, it has a number of lakes that are navigated by passenger ships and leisure boats.

== Lighthouses ==
Name	Image	Built	Water body	Location coordinates	Class of Light	Focal height	NGA number	Admiralty number	Range nml
Bregenz Westmole Lighthouse		2009	Lake Constance	Bregenz; 47°30′30.3″N 9°44′47.1″E	F W	32 metres (105 ft)	n/a	n/a	n/a
Bregenz Ostmole Lighthouse		2009	Lake Constance	Bregenz; 47°30′28.3″N 9°44′50.4″E	F R	26 metres (85 ft)	n/a	n/a	n/a
Podersdorf Lighthouse		1998	Lake Neusiedl	Podersdorf am See; 47°51′37.6″N 16°49′36.1″E	F W	11 metres (36 ft)	n/a	n/a	n/a

== See also ==
- Lists of lighthouses and lightvessels
