= List of lighthouses in the French Southern and Antarctic Lands =

This is a list of lighthouses in the French Southern and Antarctic Lands.

== Lighthouses ==
Name	Image	Year built	Location & coordinates	Class of light	Focal height	NGA number	Admiralty number	Range nml
Anchorage Range Front Lighthouse		n/a	Port-aux-Français; 49°21′17.3″S 70°12′16.4″E	Q R	7 metres (23 ft)	33108	K0821.4	12
Anchorage Range Rear Lighthouse		n/a	Port-aux-Français; 49°21′14.3″S 70°12′13.8″E	F R	21 metres (69 ft)	33112	K0821.41	12
Baie du Morbihan Range Front Lighthouse	Image	n/a	Kerguelen Islands; 49°21′07.8″S 70°04′45.4″E	Q W	5 metres (16 ft)	33100	K0820.4	12
Baie du Morbihan Range Rear Lighthouse	Image	n/a	Kerguelen Islands; 49°20′58.9″S 70°04′31.4″E	Q W	20 metres (66 ft)	33104	K0820.41	12
Île Channer Lighthouse		n/a	49°22′54.0″S 70°11′06.0″E	Q (9) W 15s.	10 metres (33 ft)	33107	K0821.5	6
Île Europa Lighthouse		1994	Europa Island; ~ 22°20′27.9″S 40°20′45.6″E	Fl R 5s.	21 metres (69 ft)	32598	D7026.5	15
Île Juan de Nova Lighthouse	Image	2001	Juan de Nova Island; 17°02′55.2″S 42°42′36.0″E	Fl R 4s.	37 metres (121 ft)	32624	D7033	8
Île Murray Lighthouse		n/a	Kerguelen Islands; 49°30′53.3″S 70°15′44.5″E	Fl (3) W 12s.	49 metres (161 ft)	33106	K0819	11
Île Tromelin Lighthouse		~1970s	Tromelin Island; 15°53′15.5″S 54°31′13.5″E	Fl R 4s.	15 metres (49 ft)	32884	D7073	8
Pointe Molloy Lighthouse	Image	n/a	Kerguelen Islands; 49°22′06.7″S 70°04′58.5″E	Fl R 2.5s.	15 metres (49 ft)	33096	K0820	3

== See also ==
- Lists of lighthouses and lightvessels
