= List of lighthouses in Norfolk Island =

This is a list of lighthouses in Norfolk Island.

== Lighthouses ==
Name	Image	Year built	Location & coordinates	Class of Light	Focal height	NGA number	Admiralty number	Range nml
Mount Pitt Lightbeacon	Image	n/a	Norfolk Island; 29°00′57.6″S 167°56′12.2″E	Al Fl WG 7.4s. Oc R 1.5s.	323 metres (1,060 ft)	3740	K4528	11

== See also ==
- Lists of lighthouses and lightvessels
