= List of lighthouses in Myanmar =

This is a list of lighthouses in Myanmar.

== Lighthouses ==
Name	Image	Year built	Location & coordinates	Class of Light	Focal height	NGA number	Admiralty number	Range nml
Alguda Reef Lighthouse		1865	Ayeyarwady Region; 15°42′16.8″N 94°11′59.1″E	Fl W 10 s.	49 metres (161 ft)	26688	F1068	13
Double Island Lighthouse		1865	Mon State; 15°52′28.6″N 97°35′08.6″E	Fl W 5s.	43 metres (141 ft)	26592	F1128	13
Eastern Grove Flats Lighthouse		1869	Yangon Region; 16°30′3.89″N 96°23′9.97″E	Oc W 6s.	28 metres (92 ft)	26620	F1088	15
Goyangyi Kyun Lighthouse		n/a	Ayeyarwady Region; 16°31′58.9″N 94°14′43.7″E	Fl W 15s.	66 metres (217 ft)	26704	F1067	12
Green Island Lighthouse		1903	Kyaikkami; 16°03′50.3″N 97°33′05.6″E	Fl (2) W 10s.	41 metres (135 ft)	26596	F1126	19
Kalwin Point		n/a	Myeik; 12°29′28.5″N 98°35′19.3″E	Fl W 3s.	12 metres (39 ft)	26572	F1138	8
Kyaukpyn Kyun Lighthouse		n/a	Moscos Islands; 13°46′37.0″N 97°55′11.3″E	Fl W 7s.	53 metres (174 ft)	26588	F1131	7
Laychindaung Lighthouse		1844	Great Savage Island; 20°5′9.01″N 92°54′1.32″E	Fl W 8s.	21 metres (69 ft)	26703	F1060	12
Lontha Lighthouse		n/a	Rakhine State; 18°21′49.0″N 94°20′15.6″E	Fl W 8s.	41 metres (135 ft)	26708	F1065	12
Mibya Kyun Lighthouse		1883	Reef Island; 13°36′30.3″N 98°12′22.4″E	Fl W 5s.	91 metres (299 ft)	26584	F1132	12
Mung Aung Lighthouse		1909	Beacon Island; 18°55′58.5″N 93°27′07.2″E	Fl (3) W 20s.	37 metres (121 ft)	26724	F1064	20
Mayu Lighthouse		1892	Oyster Island; 20°11′40.0″N 92°32′07.5″E	Oc WR 15s.	40 metres (130 ft)	26748	F1058	17
Nantha Kyun Lighthouse		n/a	Foul Island; 18°03′53.8″N 94°05′30.7″E	Q W	169 metres (554 ft)	26712	F1066	7
Obntapin Kyun Lighthouse		n/a	Unguan Island; 18°26′04.9″N 93°54′26.7″E	Fl W 12s.	44 metres (144 ft)	26716	F1064.5	12
Paungnetkyi Lighthouse		n/a	Laws Island; 19°26′31.0″N 93°36′05.0″E	Fl (4) W 5s.	33 metres (108 ft)	26732	F1062	7
Pulau Palin Lighthouse		1893 est.	Kawthaung; 9°58′20.5″N 98°29′49.5″E	Fl W 5s.	16 metres (52 ft)	26570	F1158	12
Seik Giy Training Wall East End Lighthouse		n/a	Dala Township; 16°46′08.6″N 96°07′51.2″E	Fl W 5s.	8 metres (26 ft)	n/a	F1105.5	n/a
Seikkantha Lighthouse		n/a	Myeik; 12°26′43.6″N 98°35′46.8″E	Q W	15 metres (49 ft)	26576	F1144	12
Sittwe Lighthouse		n/a	Sittwe; 20°06′51.29″N 92°53′50.68″E	Fl W 10s.	27 metres (89 ft)	26744	F1059	20
Table Island Lighthouse		1867	Table Island; 14°11′03.6″N 93°21′44.6″E	Fl (4) W 25s.	59 metres (194 ft)	26564	F1200	20
Thamihla Kyun Lighthouse		1913 est.	Diamond Island; 15°51′37.9″N 94°16′26.0″E	Fl W 4s.	24 metres (79 ft)	26692	F1070	12
Thanta Lighthouse		n/a	North Terrible Rock; 19°26′36.0″N 93°18′18.4″E	Fl W 8s.	16 metres (52 ft)	26728	F1061	7
Thilawa Range Common Rear Lighthouse		n/a	Thilawa Port; 16°39′07.6″N 96°15′49.9″E	Fl W 4s.	18 metres (59 ft)	26644	F1101	5
Wetkyun Lighthouse		n/a	James Island; 19°31′38.6″N 93°31′55.9″E	Fl W 5s.	7 metres (23 ft)	26736	F1060.5	8

== See also ==
- Lists of lighthouses and lightvessels
