= List of lighthouses in Guatemala =

This is a list of lighthouses in Guatemala.

== Lighthouses ==
Name	Image	Year built	Location & coordinates	Class of Light	Focal height	NGA number	Admiralty number	Range nml
Cabo Tres Puntas Lighthouse	Image	n/a	Izabal Department; 15°57′44.1″N 88°34′18.8″W	Fl W 3s.	40 metres (130 ft)	16424	J5982	17
Ocos Range Front Lighthouse	Image	n/a	Ocos; 14°31′49.8″N 92°13′17.9″W	Fl W 4s.	15 metres (49 ft)	15354	G3397	n/a
Ocos Range Rear Lighthouse	Image	n/a	Ocos; 14°31′58.7″N 92°13′09.8″W	Fl W 4s.	29 metres (95 ft)	15354.5	G3397.5	n/a
Porto Quetzal Lighthouse	Image	n/a	Puerto Quetzal; 13°55′21.9″N 90°46′54.7″W	Fl (2) W 5s.	30 metres (98 ft)	15363.5	G3386.6	15
Porto Quetzal Entrance Range Front Lighthouse	Image	n/a	Puerto Quetzal; 13°55′12.9″N 90°47′31.5″W	Q W	13 metres (43 ft)	15361	G3385	12
Porto Quetzal Entrance Range Rear Lighthouse	Image	n/a	Puerto Quetzal; 13°55′15.7″N 90°47′37.9″W	Oc W 4s.	18 metres (59 ft)	15361.5	G3385.1	12
Puerto Barrios Lighthouse	Image	n/a	Puerto Barrios; 15°43′50.9″N 88°35′37.6″W	Fl W 8s.	~25 metres (82 ft)	16418	J5985	25

== See also ==
- Lists of lighthouses and lightvessels
