= List of lighthouses in Guyana =

This is a list of lighthouses in Guyana.

== Lighthouses ==
Name	Image	Year built	Location & coordinates	Class of Light	Focal height	NGA number	Admiralty number	Range nml
Berbice Entrance Range Front Lighthouse	Image	2011	New Amsterdam; 6°20′48.0″N 57°31′24.0″W (NGA)	Q W	13 metres (43 ft)	17324	J6858	6
Berbice Entrance Range Rear Lighthouse	Image	2011	New Amsterdam; 6°20′12.0″N 57°31′54.0″W (NGA)	Fl (2) W 4s.	18 metres (59 ft)	17328	J6858.1	6
Clonbrook Lighthouse		n/a	Clonbrook; 6°43′53.5″N 57°56′53.8″W	inactive	2 metres (6.6 ft) (tower)	ex-17312	ex-J6852	n/a
Georgetown Lighthouse		1830	Georgetown; 6°49′25.2″N 58°09′51.3″W	Fl WR 60s.	31 metres (102 ft)	17292	J6841	16
Georgetown Range Front Lighthouse		n/a	Georgetown; 6°49′44.6″N 58°10′29.2″W	Q W	8 metres (26 ft)	17296	J6843	9
Georgetown Range Rear Lighthouse		n/a	Georgetown; 6°49′09.6″N 58°11′04.0″W	Q W 1.5s.	17 metres (56 ft)	17300	J6843.1	12

== See also ==
- Lists of lighthouses and lightvessels
