= List of lighthouses in Mayotte =

This is a list of lighthouses in Mayotte.

== Lighthouses ==
Name	Image	Year built	Location & coordinates	Class of light	Focal height	NGA number	Admiralty number	Range nml
Cap Douamougno Lighthouse		n/a	12°39′10.6″S 45°06′16.6″E	Iso WRG 4s.	109 metres (358 ft)	32777	D6891	10
Île Mtsongoma Range Front Lighthouse		n/a	12°41′21.8″S 45°07′43.8″E	V Q WRG	28 metres (92 ft)	32777.2	D6892	white: 10 red: 7 green: 7
Île Mtsongoma Range Rear Lighthouse		n/a	12°42′03.9″S 45°07′48.3″E	V Q W	45 metres (148 ft)	32777.21	D6892.1	11
Isle Blanche Lighthouse		n/a	12°43′06.2″S 45°10′25.1″E	V Q W	10 metres (33 ft)	32777.5	D6894	9
Pamanzi range Front Lighthouse		n/a	12°46′24.0″S 45°16′24.0″E	V Q W	11 metres (36 ft)	32766	D6894.6	12
Passage Bandrélé Range Front Lighthouse		n/a	12°52′34.8″S 45°13′03.0″E	Q R	21 metres (69 ft)	32768	D6900	5
Passage Bandrélé Range Front Lighthouse		n/a	12°52′31.4″S 45°12′54.6″E	Q R	54 metres (177 ft)	32772	D6900.1	5
Récif Vaucluse Lighthouse		n/a	12°39′22.9″S 45°07′16.8″E	Fl (4) G 15s.	9 metres (30 ft)	32777.4	D6892.5	4

== See also ==
- Lists of lighthouses and lightvessels
