= List of lighthouses in Melilla =

This is a list of lighthouses in Melilla.

== Lighthouses ==
| Name | Image | Year built | Location & coordinates | Class of light | Focal height | NGA number | Admiralty number | Range nml |
|---|---|---|---|---|---|---|---|---|
| Isla Isabel II Lighthouse | | 1899 | 35°17′39.6″N 2°55′56.0″E | Fl W 7s. | 8 metres (26 ft) | 22724 | E6754 | 4 |
| Melilla Lighthouse | | 1918 | 35°17′39.6″N 2°55′56.0″W | Oc (2) W 6s. | 40 metres (130 ft) | 22736 | E6758 | 14 |
| Melilla Northeast Breakwater Lighthouse | | 1937 | 35°17′39.6″N 2°55′56.0″W | Fl G 4s. | 32 metres (105 ft) | 22740 | E6762 | 7 |
| Peñón de Vélez de la Gomera Lighthouse | | 1899 | 35°10′23.0″N 4°18′03.2″W | Fl (3) W 20s. | 47 metres (154 ft) | 22816 | E6788 | 12 |

== See also ==
- List of lighthouses in Spain
- Lists of lighthouses and lightvessels
