= List of lighthouses in Saint Helena =

This is a list of lighthouses in Saint Helena.

== Lighthouses ==
Name	Image	Year built	Location & coordinates	Light characteristic	Focal height (metres)	NGA number	Admiralty number	Range (nautical miles)
James Bay Range Front Lighthouse				Fl G 3s	143	113-26100	D4904	3
James Bay Range Rear Lighthouse				Iso G 8s	170	113-26104	D4904.1	3
Buttermilk Point Lighthouse				Fl(2) W 10s	37	113-26112	D4908	10
Chubbs Point Lighthouse				Fl(2) R 10s	25	113-26108	D4906	3

== See also ==
- Lists of lighthouses and lightvessels
