= List of lighthouses in Cambodia =

This is a list of lighthouses in Cambodia.

== Lighthouses ==
Name	Image	Year built	Location & coordinates	Class of light	Focal height	NGA number	Admiralty number	Range nml
Chong Khneas Lighthouse	Image	n/a	Tonlé Sap; 13°13′04.4″N 103°49′42.0″E	n/a	n/a	n/a	n/a	n/a
Kampong Saom South Mole Lighthouse	Image	n/a	Kampong Saom; 10°38′33.8″N 103°29′53.6″E	F G	n/a	20544	F3017	n/a
Kaoh Dek Koul Lighthouse		n/a	Krong Preah Sihanouk; 10°38′06.3″N 103°27′24.6″E	Fl G 3s.	24 metres (79 ft)	20540	F3016	8
Ko Kut Lighthouse		n/a	Ko Kut District; 11°34′08.4″N 102°35′13.4″E	Fl W 10s.	207 metres (679 ft)	20552	F3010	10
Koh Koang Kang Lighthouse	Image	n/a	Krong Preah Sihanouk; 10°36′31.5″N 103°25′55.2″E	Oc (2) W9s.	14 metres (46 ft)	20536	F3015	12
Koh Rung Samloen Lighthouse	Image	early 1900s	Koh Rong; 10°32′42.6″N 103°19′03.3″E	Fl (2) W 10s.	120 metres (390 ft)	20532	F3014	24

== See also ==
- Lists of lighthouses and lightvessels
