= List of lighthouses in Guinea-Bissau =

This is a list of lighthouses in Guinea-Bissau.

== Lighthouses ==
Name	Image	Year built	Location & coordinates	Class of light	Focal height	NGA number	Admiralty number	Range nml
Bissau Catedral Range Rear Lighthouse		n/a	11°51′36.0″N 15°34′52.9″W	L Fl G 7s.	36 metres (118 ft)	24544	D3060.1	4
Cabo Mata Lighthouse		n/a	12°09′53.6″N 16°19′19.4″W	Fl (3) W 15s.	10 metres (33 ft)	24484	D3042	9
Caió Lighthouse		1906	11°50′10.3″N 16°19′16.2″W	Fl (2) W 10s.	41 metres (135 ft)	24500	D3050	16
Ilha Galinhas Lighthouse		n/a	11°30′13.5″N 15°39′23.6″W	Fl (3) W 15s.	7 metres (23 ft)	24556	D3065	9
Ilha Roxa Lighthouse		n/a	11°13′53.7″N 15°39′42.5″W	Fl (3) W 15s.	24 metres (79 ft)	24588	D3081	9
Ilhéu dos Pássaros Lighthouse		1916 est.	11°49′15.6″N 15°35′24.6″W	Fl W 5s.	17 metres (56 ft)	24524	D3058	9
Ilhéu do Poilão Lighthouse		n/a	10°52′01.3″N 15°43′34.1″W	Fl (3) W 15s.	25 metres (82 ft)	24596	D3080	9
Pedro Álvares Lighthouse		n/a	10°37′49.1″N 15°41′42.3″W	Fl W 5s.	9 metres (30 ft)	24552	D3064	9
Ponta Biombo Lighthouse		~1920s	11°44′03.4″N 15°57′03.4″W	Fl W 5s.	13 metres (43 ft)	24512	D3056	9
Ponta Colónia Lighthouse		~1920s	11°33′21.5″N 15°27′37.0″W	Fl (2) W 10s.	17 metres (56 ft)	24568	D3072	9

== See also ==
- List of lighthouses in Senegal (to the north)
- List of lighthouses in Guinea (to the south)
- Lists of lighthouses and lightvessels
