= List of lighthouses in El Salvador =

This is a list of lighthouses in El Salvador.

== Lighthouses ==
Name	Image	Year built	Location & coordinates	Class of light	Focal height	NGA number	Admiralty number	Range nml
Acajutla Lighthouse	Image	1872 est.	Acajutla; 13°34′52.8″N 89°50′04.0″W	Iso W 12s.	25 metres (82 ft)	15364	G3380	8
Isla Zacatillo Lighthouse		n/a	La Unión; 13°18′42.9″N 87°46′09.7″W	L Fl W 14s.	18 metres (59 ft)	15388	G3367	5
Punta Ampala Lighthouse		n/a	La Unión Department; 13°09′16.9″N 87°53′58.7″W	Fl W 15s.	27 metres (89 ft)	15394	G3362	12
Punta Chiquirin Lighthouse	Image	n/a	La Unión Department; 13°17′30.3″N 87°46′46.1″W	L Fl W 13s.	18 metres (59 ft)	15384	G3366	10
Punta Remedios Lighthouse	Image	1905 est.	Acajutla; 13°31′25.2″N 89°48′19.5″W	L Fl W 20s.	25 metres (82 ft)	15372	G3378	14

== See also ==
- Lists of lighthouses and lightvessels
