= List of lighthouses in French Guiana =

This is a list of lighthouses in French Guiana.

== Lighthouses ==
| Name | Image | Year built | Location & coordinates | Class of light | Focal height | NGA number | Admiralty number | Range nml |
|---|---|---|---|---|---|---|---|---|
| Cheval Blanc Lighthouse | Image | n/a | Cayenne; 4°55′39.0″N 52°20′41.1″W | Q R | 12 metres (39 ft) | 17440 | J6904 | 5 |
| Fort Cépérou Lighthouse | Image | 1905 | Cayenne; 4°56′15.7″N 52°20′13.3″W | Fl (2+1) WR 15s. | 40 metres (130 ft) | 17436 | J6902 | white: 16 red: 13 |
| Île Royale Lighthouse | | 1934 | Île Royale; 5°17′13.5″N 52°35′31.1″W | Fl (2) W 10s. | 65 metres (213 ft) | 17416 | J6894 | 25 |
| Île Royale Jetée Lighhtouse | Image | n/a | Île Royale; 5°17′04.2″N 52°35′12.8″W | F G | 8 metres (26 ft) | 17420 | J6895 | 11 |
| L' Enfant Perdu Lighthouse | Image | 1919 | 5°02′30.9″N 52°21′14.1″W | Fl W 4s. | 17 metres (56 ft) | 17428 | J6901 | 11 |
| Tour Dreyfus Lighthouse | | n/a | Kourou; 5°09′34.6″N 52°37′35.8″W | daymark | 12 metres (39 ft) (tower) | n/a | n/a | n/a |

== See also ==
- Lists of lighthouses and lightvessels
