= List of lighthouses in Saint Pierre and Miquelon =

This is a list of lighthouses in Saint Pierre and Miquelon.

== Lighthouses ==
Name	Image	Year built	Coordinates	Class of light	Focal height	NGA number	Admiralty number	Range nml
Cap Blanc Lighthouse	Image	1883	Miquelon-Langlade; 47°06′18.2″N 56°23′56.1″W	Fl (3) WR 15s.	19 metres (62 ft)	2212	H0328	white: 22 red: 18
Point aux Canons Lighthouse	Image	1862	Saint Pierre Island; 46°46′53.0″N 56°09′58.2″W	Oc R 4s.	11 metres (36 ft)	2192	H0342	6
Pointe Plate Lighthouse	Image	1881	Miquelon-Langlade; 46°49′20.4″N 56°24′08.5″W	Fl WR 4s.	43 metres (141 ft)	2208	H0330	white: 12 red: 9
Rocher Petite Saint-Pierre Lighthouse	Image	1924	Saint Pierre Island; 46°47′55.0″N 56°08′54.3″W	Fl WR 2.5s.	12 metres (39 ft)	2172	H0338	white: 9 red: 6
Tete de Galantry Lighthouse	Image	1978	Saint Pierre Island; 46°45′54.5″N 56°09′14.3″W	Fl (2) W 10s.	18 metres (59 ft)	2160	H0332	23

== See also ==
- Lists of lighthouses and lightvessels
