= List of lighthouses in Switzerland =

This is a list of lighthouses in Switzerland. Although Switzerland is a landlocked country, it has a number of lakes that are navigated by passenger ships and leisure boats.

== Lighthouses ==
Name	Image	Water body	Location & coordinates	Year built	Class of Light	Focal height	ARLHS number	Range nml
Genève Jetée du Sud Lighthouse		Lake Geneva	Geneva; 46°12′28.9″N 6°09′21.7″E	1911	F R	3 metres (9.8 ft)	SWI-002	n/a
Les Pâquis Lighthouse		Lake Geneva	Geneva; 46°12′36.1″N 6°09′25.1″E	1896	F RG	16 metres (52 ft)	SWI-001	n/a
Morges Jetée du Nord Lighthouse		Lake Geneva	Morges; 46°30′23.3″N 6°29′56.7″E	n/a	F G	8 metres (26 ft)	SWI-004	n/a
Morges Jetée du Sud Lighthouse		Lake Geneva	Morges; 46°30′22.1″N 6°29′56.5″E	n/a	F R	9 metres (30 ft)	SWI-003	n/a
Romanshorn Shoal Lighthouse		Lake Constance	Romanshorn; 47°34′00.5″N 9°23′32.0″E	n/a	F W	8 metres (26 ft)	n/a	n/a
Rorschach Lighthouse		Lake Constance	Rorschach; 47°28′45.9″N 9°29′40.5″E	1869	F G	12 metres (39 ft)	SWI-006	n/a

== Lighthouse in Unterterzen ==
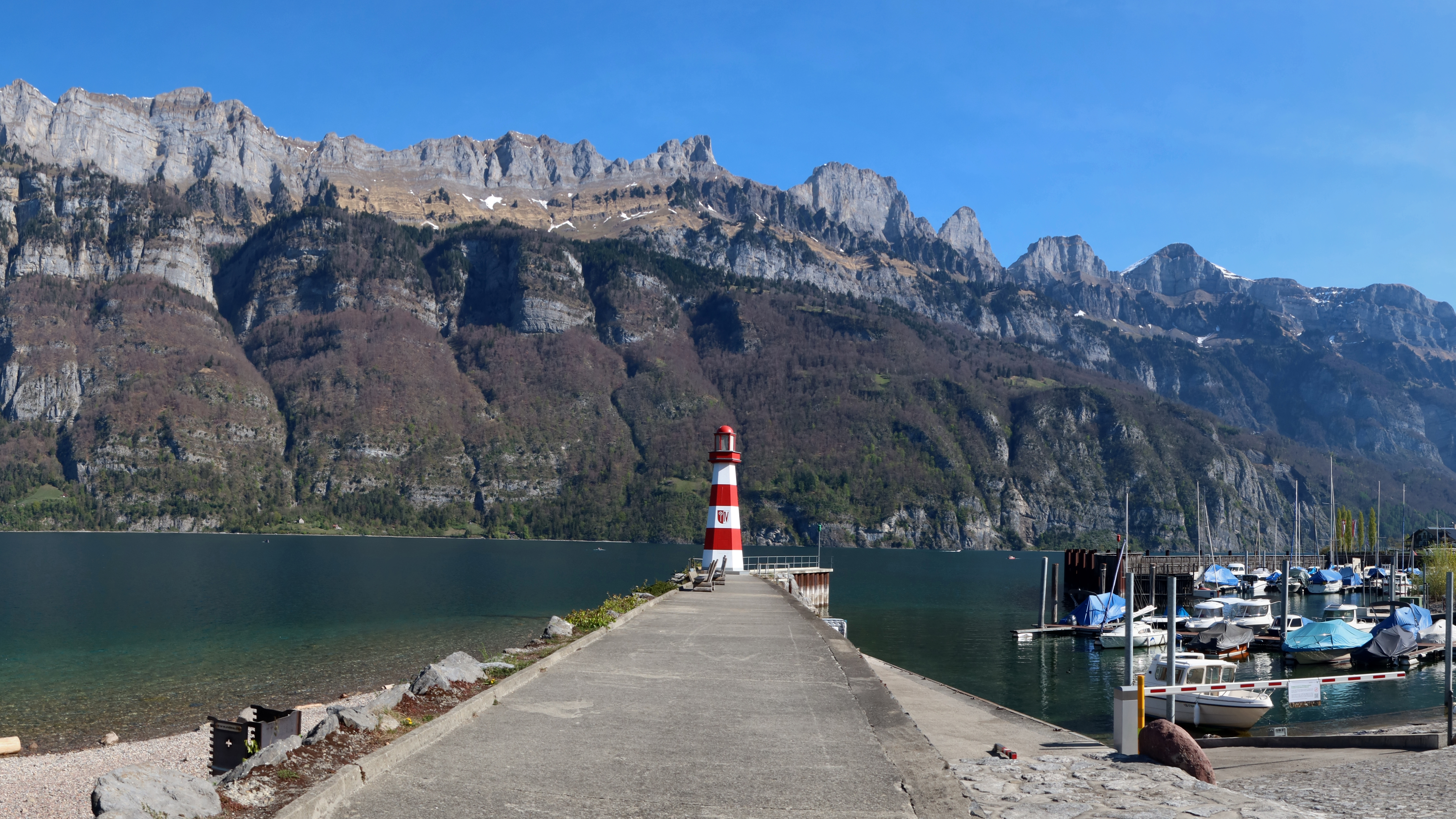
Lighthouse in Unterterzen (Churfirsten in the background)

Unterterzen on Lake Walen (Walensee) has a lighthouse since 2019, which was previously an art exhibit of "BadRagARTz" in Bad Ragaz in 2018.

== See also ==
- Lists of lighthouses and lightvessels
