= List of lighthouses in Ascension Island =

This is a list of lighthouses in Ascension Island.

== Lighthouses ==
Name	Image	Year built	Location & coordinates	Class of light	Focal height	NGA number	Admiralty number	Range nml
Clarence Bay Entrance Range Front Lighthouse		n/a	7°55′35.9″S 14°24′31.8″W	F G	27 metres (89 ft)	26072	D4800	5
Clarence Bay Entrance Range Rear Lighthouse		n/a	7°55′37.4″S 14°24′30.6″W	F G	35 metres (115 ft)	26076	D4800.1	5

== See also ==
- Lists of lighthouses and lightvessels
