= List of lighthouses in Saint Kitts and Nevis =

This is a list of lighthouses in Saint Kitts and Nevis.

== Lighthouses ==
Name	Image	Year built	Location & coordinates	Class of light	Focal height	NGA number	Admiralty number	Range nml
Basseterre Market Lighthouse	Image	n/a	Basseterre; 17°17′39.2″N 62°43′36.7″W	Q R	6 metres (20 ft)	14754	J5623.21	5
Fort Thomas Lighthouse		n/a	Basseterre; 17°17′20.7″N 62°44′03.2″W	F R	20 metres (66 ft)	14752	J5672	n/a
Fort Smith Lighthouse		n/a	Basseterre; 17°17′23.4″N 62°42′33.8″W	F G	11 metres (36 ft)	14756	J5674	2

== See also ==
- Lists of lighthouses and lightvessels
