= List of lighthouses in Romania =

This is a list of lighthouses in Romania.

== Lighthouses ==
Name	Image	Year built	Coordinates	Class of Light	Focal height	NGA number	Admiralty number	Range nml
Capul Tuzla Lighthouse		1901	43°59′26.9″N 28°39′59.0″E	Fl (2) W 9.7s.	62 metres (203 ft)	17688	E5022	20
Constanța Lighthouse		1961	44°09′29.3″N 28°37′49.5″E	Fl (2) w 29.8s.	87 metres (285 ft)	17692	E5025	24
Constanța East Breakwater Spur Lighthouse		n/a	44°08′51.5″N 28°40′19.0″E	Fl G 3s.	14 metres (46 ft)	17704	E5026.2	5
Constanța East Outer Breakwater Lighthouse - FARUL ALB		n/a	44°08′36.4″N 28°40′22.2″E	Fl W 4.5s.	24 metres (79 ft)	17700	E5026	10
Constanța South Breakwater Lighthouse		n/a	44°08′49.1″N 28°40′07.7″E	Fl R 3s.	14 metres (46 ft)	17708	E5026.4	5
Mangalia Lighthouse		n/a	43°48′39.2″N 28°33′31.0″E	Fl (2) W 5.5s.	72 metres (236 ft)	17664	E5018	22
Mangalia Northeast Breakwater Lighthouse		n/a	43°47′56.2″N 28°36′01.7″E	Fl W 4s.	23 metres (75 ft)	17668	E5019	10
Mangalia Northeast Breakwater Spur Lighthouse		n/a	43°48′04.3″N 28°35′43.2″E	Fl G 3s.	15 metres (49 ft)	17672	E5019.5	5
Mangalia Southeast Breakwater Lighthouse		n/a	43°47′55.0″N 28°35′34.7″E	Fl R 3s.	15 metres (49 ft)	17684	E5020	5
Midia Lighthouse		~1958	44°20′54.0″N 28°41′16.6″E	Fl W 5s.	36 metres (118 ft)	17732	E5030	17
Midia Entrance Lighthouse		~1958	44°19′17.2″N 28°41′40.3″E	Fl W 5s.	25 metres (82 ft)	17733	E5030.2	10
Portița Lighthouse		n/a	44°40′31.6″N 28°59′14.2″E	Fl W 9s.	22 metres (72 ft)	17736	E5031	10
Sfântu Gheorghe Lighthouse		1967	44°53′56.9″N 29°36′01.5″E	Fl (2) W 7.2s.	48 metres (157 ft)	17740	E5032	19
Sulina Lighthouse		1983	45°08′53.9″N 29°45′33.6″E	Fl (3) W 16.2s.	49 metres (161 ft)	17744	E5034	19
Tomis Northeast Breakwater Lighthouse		n/a	44°10′42.1″N 28°39′45.0″E	Fl G 3s.	10 metres (33 ft)	17720	E5028.2	4
Tomis Southeast Breakwater Lighthouse		n/a	44°10′40.1″N 28°39′43.3″E	Fl R 3s.	10 metres (33 ft)	17728	E5028	4

== See also ==
- Lists of lighthouses and lightvessels
