= List of lighthouses in Equatorial Guinea =

This is a list of lighthouses in Equatorial Guinea.

== Lighthouses ==
Name	Image	Year built	Location & coordinates	Class of light	Focal height	NGA number	Admiralty number	Range nml
Bahia de Riaba Lighthouse		n/a	3°22′54.0″N 8°45′48.0″E	Fl WRG 5s.	n/a	25164	D4060	5
Cabo San Juan Lighthouse		n/a	1°10′32.1″N 9°20′31.9″E	Fl (2) W 10s.	24 metres (79 ft)	25276	D4190	15
Fronton de Caracas Lighthouse		n/a	3°25′24.6″N 8°48′26.1″E	Fl (3) WR 12s.	18 metres (59 ft)	25160	D4064	white: 8 red: 5
Islote Horacio Lighthouse		n/a	3°45′37.6″N 8°54′32.8″E	Fl W 4s.	21 metres (69 ft)	25136	D4028	10
Mission de Santo Antonio Lighthouse		n/a	1°24′19.7″S 5°38′03.9″E	Fl W 4s.	46 metres (151 ft)	25208	D4248	10
Port de Cogo Lighthouse		n/a	1°04′56.5″N 9°41′44.3″E	Iso WRG 4s.	32 metres (105 ft)	25288	D4210	white: 9 red: 7 green: 7
Punta Barceloneta Lighthouse		n/a	3°28′04.5″N 8°32′40.3″E	Fl (4) WR 15s.	44 metres (144 ft)	25144	D4046	white: 12 red: 10
Punta Europa Lighthouse		n/a	3°47′01.6″N 8°43′07.6″E	Fl (3) W 20s.	71 metres (233 ft)	25112	D4040	25
Punta Mbonda Lighthouse		n/a	2°05′37.1″N 9°45′54.2″E	Fl (3+1) W 20s.	36 metres (118 ft)	25248	D4170	20
Punta Ngaba Lighthouse		n/a	1°44′42.0″N 9°40′54.0″E	Fl W 5s.	19 metres (62 ft)	25260	D4175.4	18
Punta Santiago Lighthouse		n/a	3°12′36.5″N 8°40′34.3″E	Fl (2+1) W 20s.	80 metres (260 ft)	25156	D4056	12
Punta de la Unidad Africana Lighthouse		n/a	3°45′55.1″N 8°46′59.2″E	Oc (4) R 12s.	34 metres (112 ft)	25120	D4032	5

== See also ==
- List of lighthouses in Cameroon (to the west)
- List of lighthouses in Gabon (to the east)
- Lists of lighthouses and lightvessels
