= List of lighthouses in Bolivia =

This is a list of lighthouses in Bolivia.

== Lighthouses ==
Name	Image	Year built	Waterbody	Location & coordinates	Class of light	Focal height	ARLHS number	(*) SNHN number
Chúa Lighthouse	Image	n/a	Lake Titicaca	Omasuyos Province; 16°11′25.5″S 68°45′13.9″W	Fl W 10s.	10 metres (33 ft) (tower)	BOL-003	SNHN-3513
Copacabana Lighthouse	Image	n/a	Lake Titicaca	Copacabana, Bolivia; 16°09′41.1″S 69°05′38.5″W	Fl R 8.5s.	20 metres (66 ft)	BOL-002	SNHN-3505
Khella Lighthouse	Image	n/a	Lake Titicaca	Strait of Tiquina; 16°13′25.2″S 68°50′07.9″W	Fl G 7.5s.	20 metres (66 ft)	BOL-006	SNHN-3509
Pallakhasa Lighthouse		n/a	Lake Titicaca	Isla del Sol; 16°03′21.1″S 69°09′47.1″W	Fl W 6.5s.	7 metres (23 ft) (tower)	BOL-004	SNHN-3502
Tamengo Lighthouse	Image	n/a	Tamengo Canal	Puerto Quijarro; 19°00′35.4″S 57°41′38.9″W	Fl W 12s.	15 metres (49 ft)	BOL-001	SNHN-0003
Tiquina Lighthouse		n/a	Lake Titicaca	Strait of Tiquina; 16°12′57.5″S 68°51′30.2″W	Fl W 7.5s.	10 metres (33 ft) (tower)	BOL-005	SNHN-3508
Taquiri Lighthouse		n/a	Lake Titicaca	Isla Suquiri; 16°17′22.9″S 68°48′08.6″W	Fl (2) W 10s.	15 metres (49 ft)	BOL-007	SNHN-3510

(*) SNHN (Servicio Nacional de Hidrografía Naval)

== See also ==
- Lists of lighthouses and lightvessels
