= List of lighthouses in Palau =

This is a list of lighthouses in Palau.

== Lighthouses ==
Name	Image	Year built	Location & coordinates	Class of light	Focal height	NGA number	Admiralty number	Range nml
Aivon Lighthouse		n/a	Ngarchelong; 7°43′28.6″N 134°37′09.9″E	inactive	n/a	n/a	n/a	n/a
Angaur Lightouse		n/a	Angaur; 6°53′54.0″N 134°07′37.5″E	Fl W 5s.	n/a	10934	M8410	10
Koror Lighthouse	Image	1903	Ngeruktabel Island; ~7°15′19.8″N 134°26′51.2″E	inactive	9 metres (30 ft) (tower)	n/a	n/a	n/a
Malakal Pass Lighthouse		n/a	Malakal Island; 7°16′55.8″N 134°27′52.4″E	Fl W 6s.	7 metres (23 ft)	10936	M8408	7

== See also ==
- Lists of lighthouses and lightvessels
