= List of lighthouses in Easter Island =

This is a list of lighthouses in Easter Island.

== Lighthouses ==
| Name | Image | Year built | Location & coordinates | Class of light | Focal height | NGA number | Admiralty number | Range nml |
|---|---|---|---|---|---|---|---|---|
| Hanga Roa Lighthouse | Image | n/a | Hanga Roa; 27°08′49.6″S 109°25′51.9″W | Fl R 5s. | 6 metres (20 ft) | 1152.5 | G1992 | 8 |
| Hotu-iti Lighthouse | Image | n/a | Hotu-iti; 27°07′36.5″S 109°16′34.0″W | Fl W 10s. | 7 metres (23 ft) | 1154 | G1994.5 | 9 |
| La Perouse Lighthouse | Image | n/a | La Perouse; 27°05′19.1″S 109°17′53.1″W | Fl W 5s. | 8 metres (26 ft) | 1153 | G1994 | 5 |
| Vaihu Lighthouse | Image | n/a | Vaihu; 27°09′56.0″S 109°21′50.0″W | Fl W 12s. | 8 metres (26 ft) | 1155 | G1995 | 9 |

== See also ==
- List of lighthouses in Chile
