= List of lighthouses in the Gambia =

This is a list of lighthouses in the Gambia.

== Lighthouses ==
Name	Image	Year built	Location & coordinates	Class of light	Focal height	NGA number	Admiralty number	Range nml
Banjul Point Lighthouse		n/a	13°27′18.0″N 16°34′24.0″W	Iso W 8s.	27 metres (89 ft)	24465	D3027.5	10
Barra Point Lighthouse		1863 est.	13°29′15.9″N 16°32′55.4″W	Fl (3) R 15s.	18 metres (59 ft)	24464	D3027	10
Cape St. Mary Lighthouse		n/a	13°28′24.1″N 16°41′41.9″W	Fl (2) W 10s.	43 metres (141 ft)	24452	D3021	15
Fort James Island Lighthouse		n/a	13°19′02.3″N 16°21′40.4″W	Fl W 14.5s.	8 metres (26 ft)	24468	D3030	n/a

== See also ==
- Lists of lighthouses and lightvessels
