= List of lighthouses in Madeira =

This is a list of lighthouses in Madeira.

== Lighthouses ==
Name	Image	Year built	Location & coordinates	Class of light	Focal height	NGA number	Admiralty number	Range nml
Câmara de Lobos Lighthouse		1937	Câmara de Lobos; 32°38′49.2″N 16°58′32.1″W	Oc R 6s.	23 metres (75 ft)	23724	D2744	9
Funchal Breakwater Lighthouse		n/a	Funchal; 32°38′30.7″N 16°54′25.4″W	Fl R 5s.	15 metres (49 ft)	23728	D2738	8
Ilhéu de Bugio Lighthouse		2003	Deserta Grande Island; 32°24′15.6″N 16°27′49.0″W	Fl W 4s.	72 metres (236 ft)	23752	D2722	13
Ilhéu do Chão Lighthouse		1959	Deserta Grande Island; 32°35′22.7″N 16°32′45.2″W	L Fl (2) W 15s.	112 metres (367 ft)	23748	D2720	13
Ilhéu de Cima Lighthouse		1900	Porto Santo Island; 33°03′17.1″N 16°16′43.3″W	Fl (3) W 15s.	124 metres (407 ft)	23756	D2756	21
Ilhéu de Ferro Lighthouse		1959	Porto Santo Island; 33°02′19.9″N 16°24′22.0″W	L Fl W 15s.	130 metres (430 ft)	23768	D2762	13
Ilhéu Mole Lighthouse		n/a	Porto Moniz; 32°52′10.8″N 17°09′50.7″W	Fl WR 5s.	65 metres (213 ft)	23708	D2754	white: 10 red: 8
Ponta do Pargo Lighthouse		1922	Ponta do Pargo; 32°48′50.1″N 17°15′47.0″W	Fl (3) W 20s.	312 metres (1,024 ft)	23712	D2752	26
Ponta de São Jorge Lighthouse		1959	São Jorge; 32°50′04.6″N 16°54′22.3″W	L Fl W 5s.	271 metres (889 ft)	23744	D2755	15
Ponta de São Lourenço Lighthouse		1870	Madeira; 32°43′47.7″N 16°39′25.1″W	Fl W 5s.	103 metres (338 ft)	23740	D2726	20
Porto Santo North Mole Lighthouse		n/a	Porto Santo; 33°03′34.6″N 16°18′54.5″W	Fl R 4s.	13 metres (43 ft)	23765	D2757.2	7
Porto Santo South Mole Lighthouse		n/a	Porto Santo; 33°03′29.2″N 16°18′51.9″W	Fl G 4s.	17 metres (56 ft)	23766	D2757	6
Ribeira Brava Lighthouse		~1920s	Ribeira Brava; 32°40′07.8″N 17°03′53.0″W	Fl R 5s.	34 metres (112 ft)	23720	D2746	9
Selvagem Grande Lighthouse		1977	Selvagem Grande Island; 30°08′43.6″N 15°52′16.1″W	Fl W 4s.	163 metres (535 ft)	23776	D2768	13

== See also ==
- List of lighthouses in Portugal
