= Cruz Salmerón Acosta Municipality =

Cruz Salmerón Acosta Municipality Municipio Cruz Salmerón Acosta
- Municipality
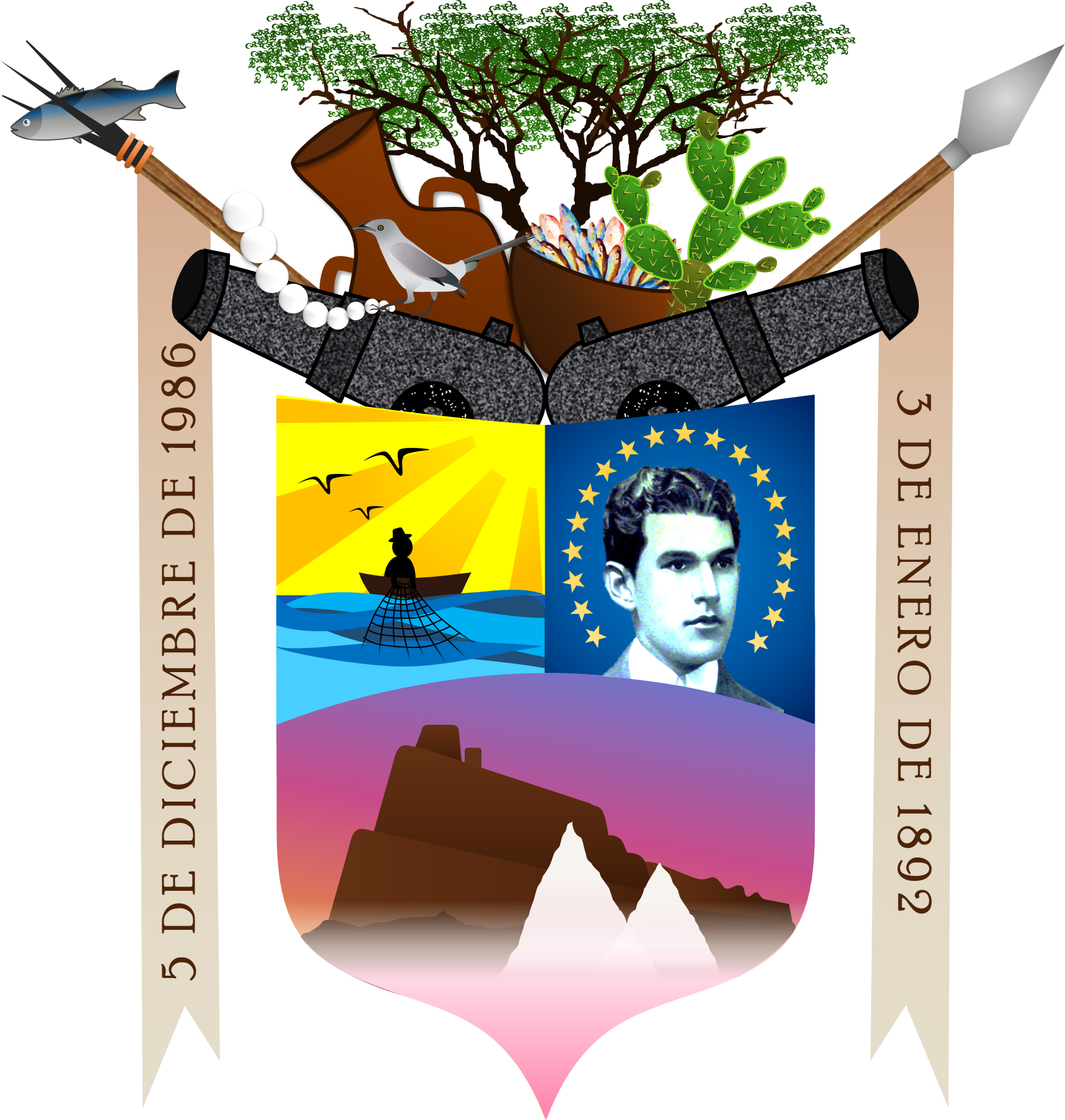
- Flag Coat of arms

- Location in Sucre

- Location in Venezuela
- Coordinates: 10°35′55″N 64°02′13″W
- Country: Venezuela
- State: Sucre

Area
  - Total: 612 km^{2} (236 sq mi)
- Time zone: UTC−4 (VET)

Cruz Salmerón Acosta is a municipality of Sucre, Venezuela. It has three parishes and the capital is Araya. As of 2021, it has a population of 44,811.
