= Tupkaragan District =

Coordinates: 44°31′N 50°16′E

Tupkaragan Түпқараған ауданы Tüpqarağan audany
- District
- Аудан
- Seal

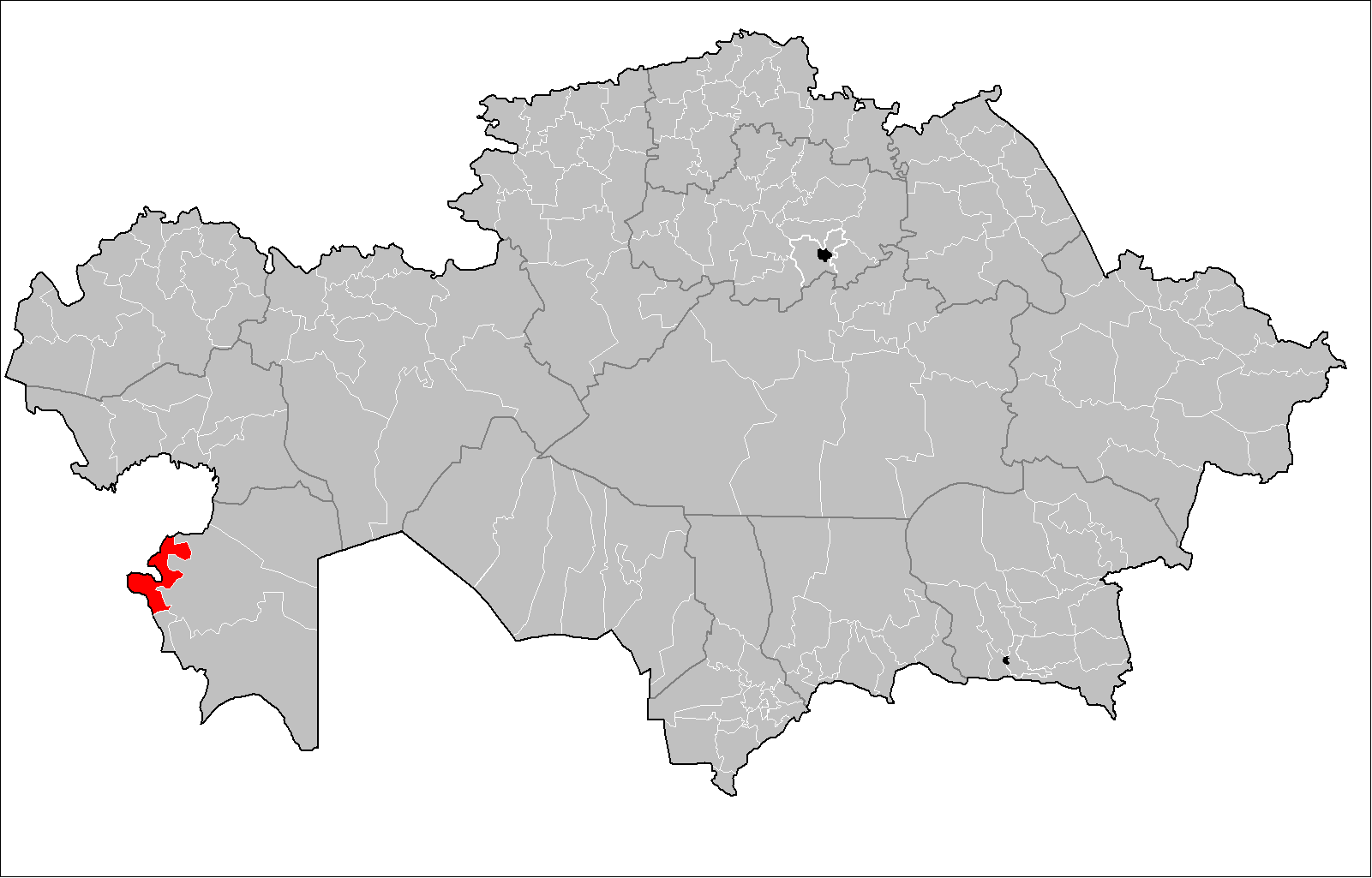
- Country: Kazakhstan
- Region: Mangystau Region
- Administrative center: Fort-Shevchenko

Government
  - Akim: Eltizarov Rakhat Tezekbayevich

Population (2013)
  - Total: 22,835
- Time zone: UTC+5 (West)

Tupkaragan District (Kazakh: Түпқараған ауданы, romanized: Tüpqarağan audany) is a district of Mangystau Region in south-western Kazakhstan. The administrative center of the district is the town of Fort-Shevchenko. Population: 22,835 (2013 estimate); 20,544 (2009 census results); 14,225 (1999 census results).
