= Mengeary Point =

Coordinates: 51°39′00″S 57°43′00″W

Mengeary Point (Spanish: Punta Celebroña) is a cape which marks the northern entrance to Port William and the southern entrance to the Berkeley Sound, on the east coast of East Falkland, Falkland Islands. It is located near Kidney Island and has a lighthouse.
