= List of lighthouses in Egypt =

This is a list of lighthouses in Egypt, which are located along both the Mediterranean and Red Sea coastlines of this North African country. The list includes active maritime lighthouses that are named landfall lights, or that have a range of at least fifteen nautical miles. The Admiralty number is that used in Admiralty List of Lights and Fog Signals Light List.

== Lighthouses on the Mediterranean Sea ==
The following lighthouses are located on or near the Mediterranean Sea.

Name	Location & coordinates	Year built	Tower height (metres)	Focal height (metres)	Range (nmi)	Admiralty no.
Burullus Lighthouse		1992	39	47	20	E6162
Damietta Lighthouse		1992	39	47	20	E6156
El Agami Lighthouse			14	17	15	E6173.50
El Arish Lighthouse		1997	20	39	18	E5973
El Bahar Tower Lighthouse		2008	42	42	15	E5978.60
El Dikheila Range Rear Lighthouse			27	31	17	E6191.10
El Max Old Lighthouse		1894				
Great Pass Beacon Lighthouse			21	21	16	E6174
Montaza Palace Lighthouse						
Port Said Lighthouse		1869	56	47	20	N5978
Ras el Shaqiq Lighthouse		1987	15	47	20	E6193
Ras el-Tin Lighthouse		1848	55	52	21	E6173
Raschid Lighthouse		1991	15	47	20	E6166

== Lighthouses on the Red Sea ==
The following lighthouses are located on or near the Red Sea.

Name	Location & coordinates	Year built	Tower height (metres)	Focal height (metres)	Range (nmi)	Admiralty no.
Ashrafi Juzur Lighthouse		1940	26	38	17	D7296.74
Ayn Sukhnah Lighthouse		2008	39	44	22	D7297.05
Birket Misallat Lighthouse			39	42	18	D7297.28
Bluff Point Lighthouse			10	24	15	D7296.72
Brothers Islands Lighthouse		1883	31	36	17	D7296.2
Dahab Lighthouse			10	20	15	D7297.77
Daedalus Reef Lighthouse		1931	30	30	15	D7296.1
El Ghardaqa Range Front			18	76	18	D7296.521
El Ghardaqa Range Rear Lighthouse			15	55	18	D7296.52
El Mallaha Lighthouse			10	12	15	D7296.85
Enterprise Passage Lighthouse			10	13	15	D7297.67
False Ras Gharib Lighthouse			10	11	15	D7296.97
Giftun el-Saghir Lighthouse			25	31	16	D7296.5
Jazirat Shakir Lighthouse		1889	20	37	22	D7296.7
Lahata Lighthouse			39	47	18	D7297.31
Nuweibah Lighthouse			10	46	15	D7297.79
Qad Ibn Haddan Lighthouse		1987	39	47	22	D7296.725
Qadd el Tawila Lighthouse			39	47	18	D7297.3
Ras Abu Darag Lighthouse		1926	30	50	19	D7297.01
Ras Abu Sawmah Lighthouse			28	30	16	D7296.4
Ras Dib Lighthouse			10	45	15	D7296.78
Ras Gharib Lighthouse		1987	39	46	22	D7296.95
Ras Muhaggara Lighthouse			39	43	18	D7297.09
Ras Muhammad Lighthouse			10	15	15	D7296.724
Ras Ruahmi Lighthouse			24	22	15	D7296.98
Ras Shukier Lighthouse			17	85	22	D7296.8
Ras Umm Sidd Lighthouse		1987	17	45	22	D7297.62
Zafarana lighthouse		1862	25	25	17	D7297
Ras Zeit Lighthouse			10	28	15	D7296.77
Siyal Island Lighthouse			10	15	15	D7296.65
Umm El-Kiman Lighthouse			10	24	15	D7296.75
Umm Qamar Lighthouse			12	24	15	D7296.58

== Gallery ==
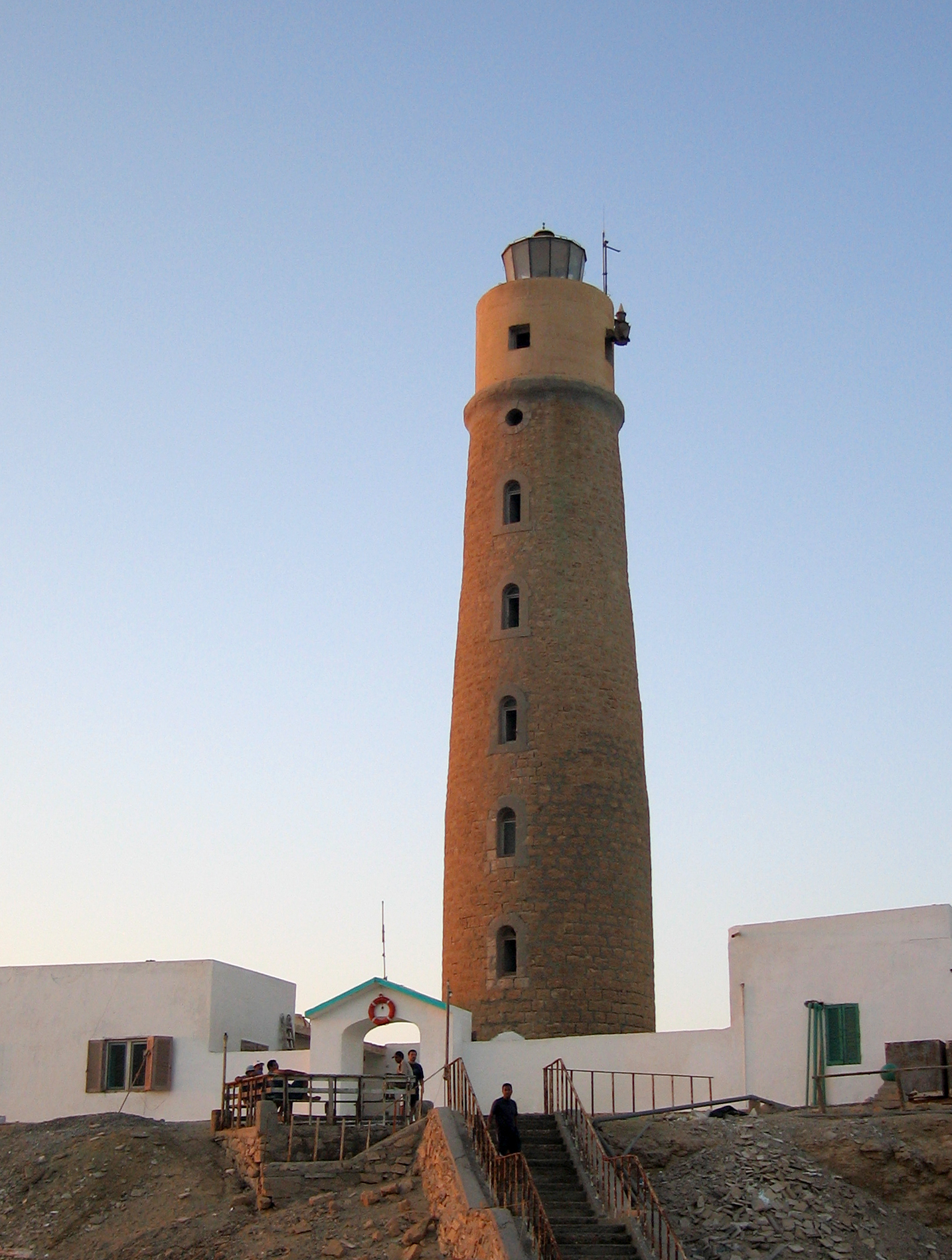
Brothers Islands Lighthouse

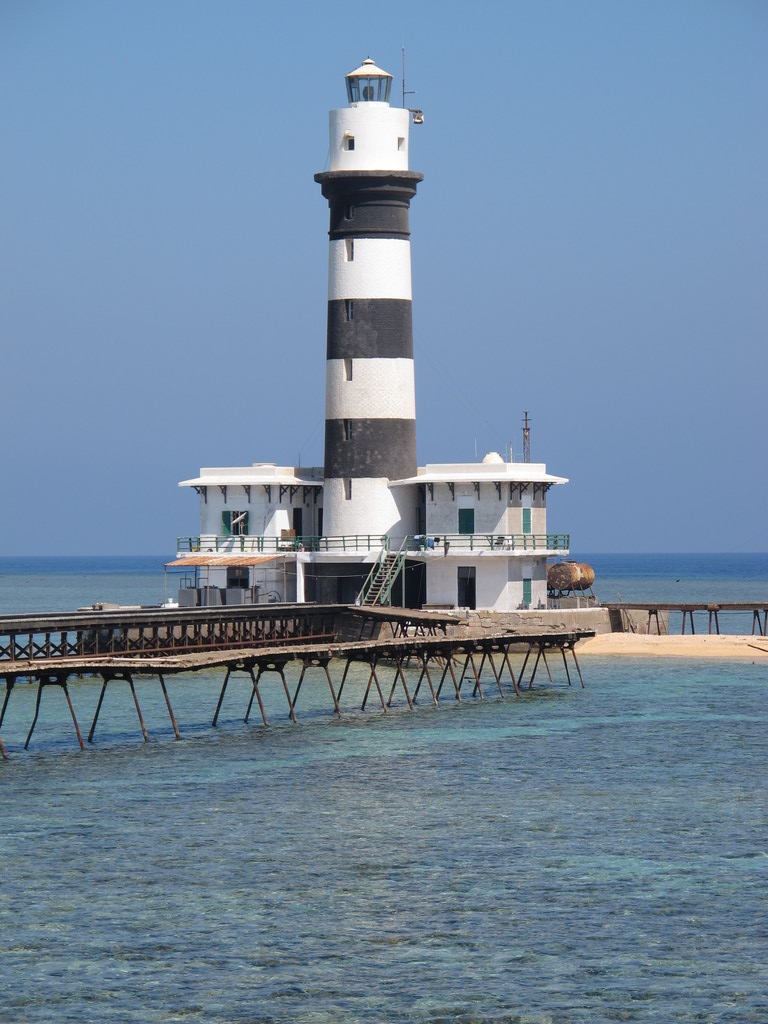
Daedalus Reef

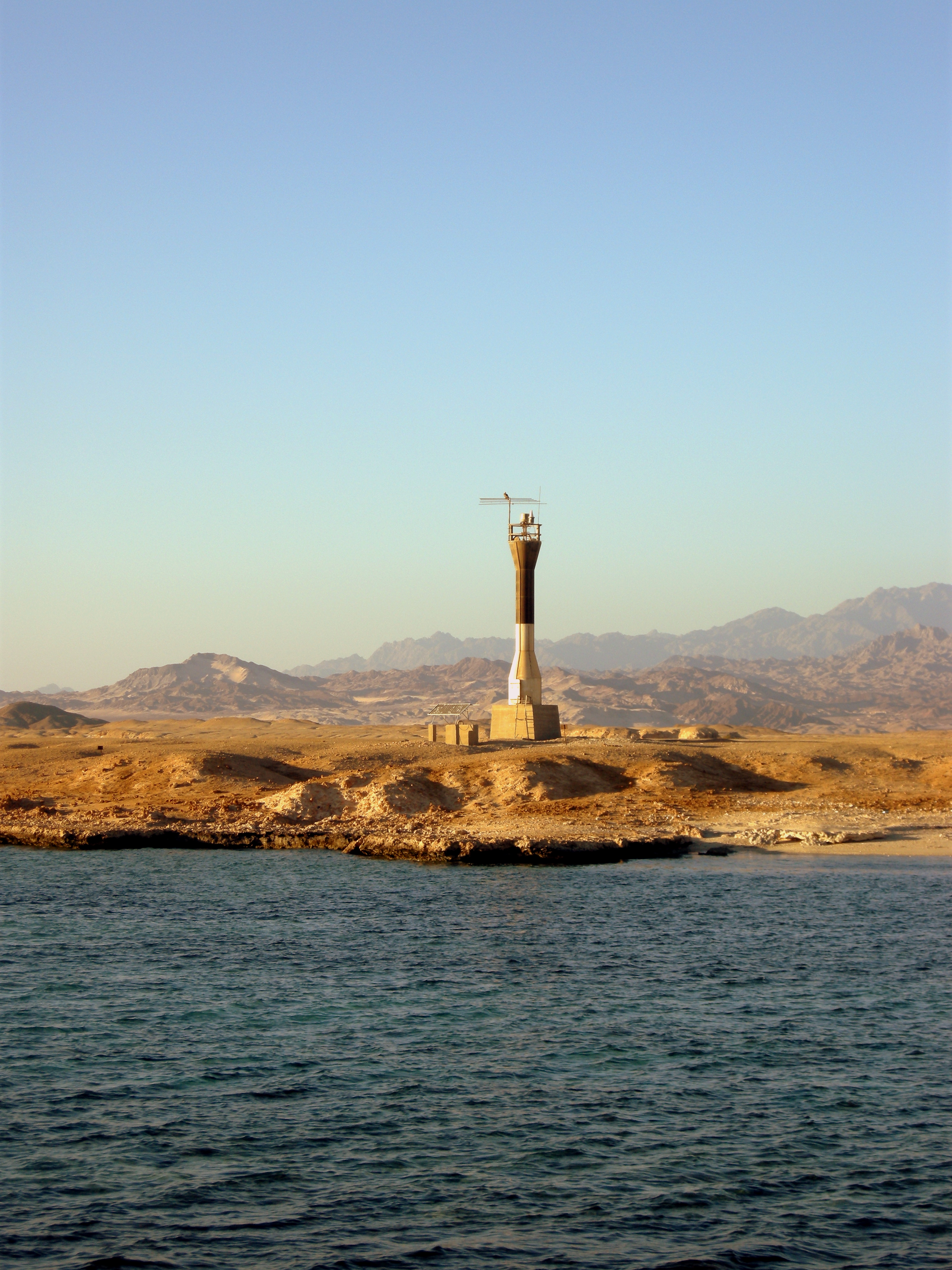
Ras Muhammad

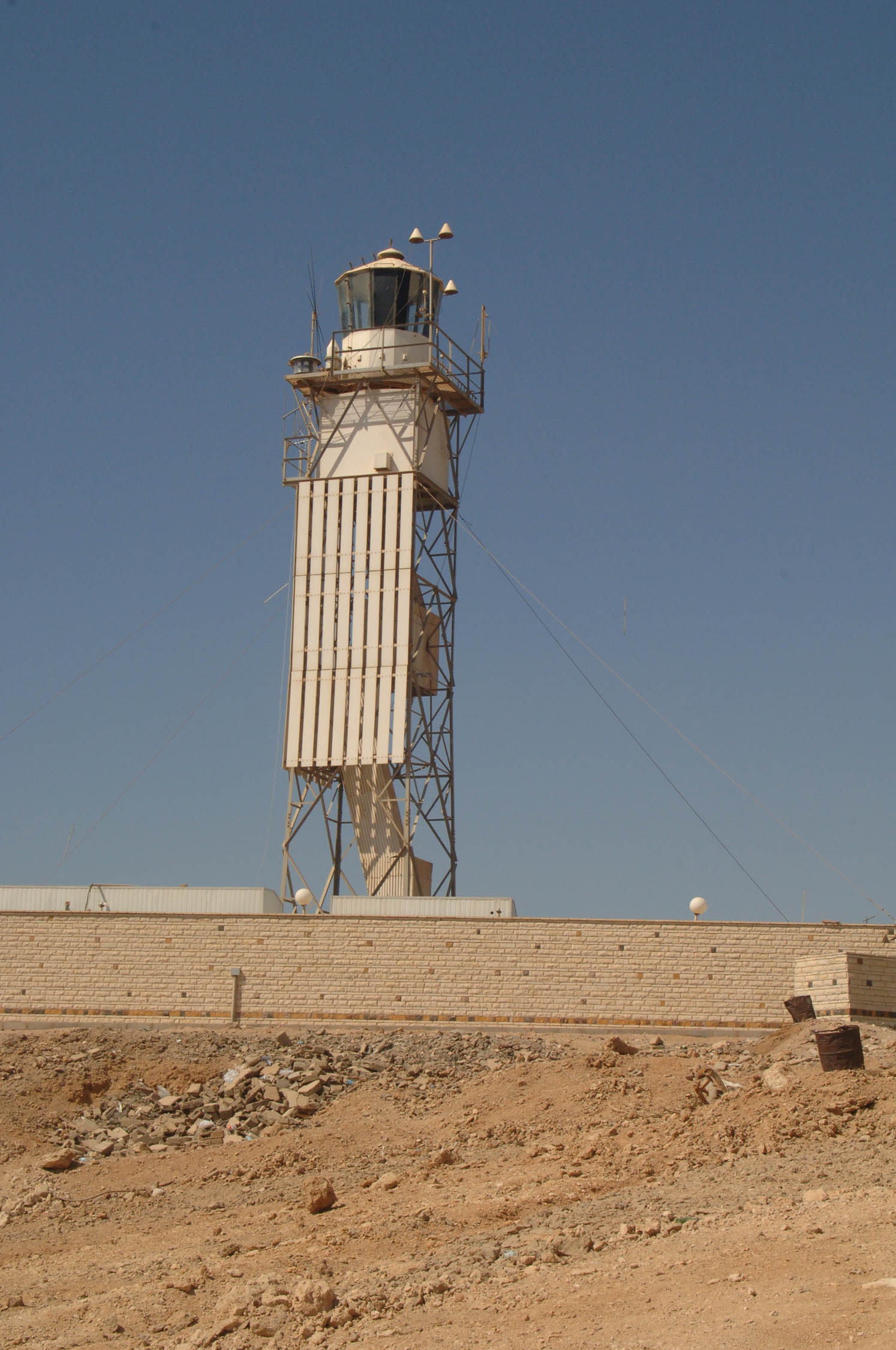
Ras Umm Sidd (Sharm el-Sheikh)

== See also ==
- List of lighthouses in Libya (to the west)
- List of lighthouses in Israel (to the east)
- List of lighthouses in Sudan (to the south)
- Lists of lighthouses and lightvessels
