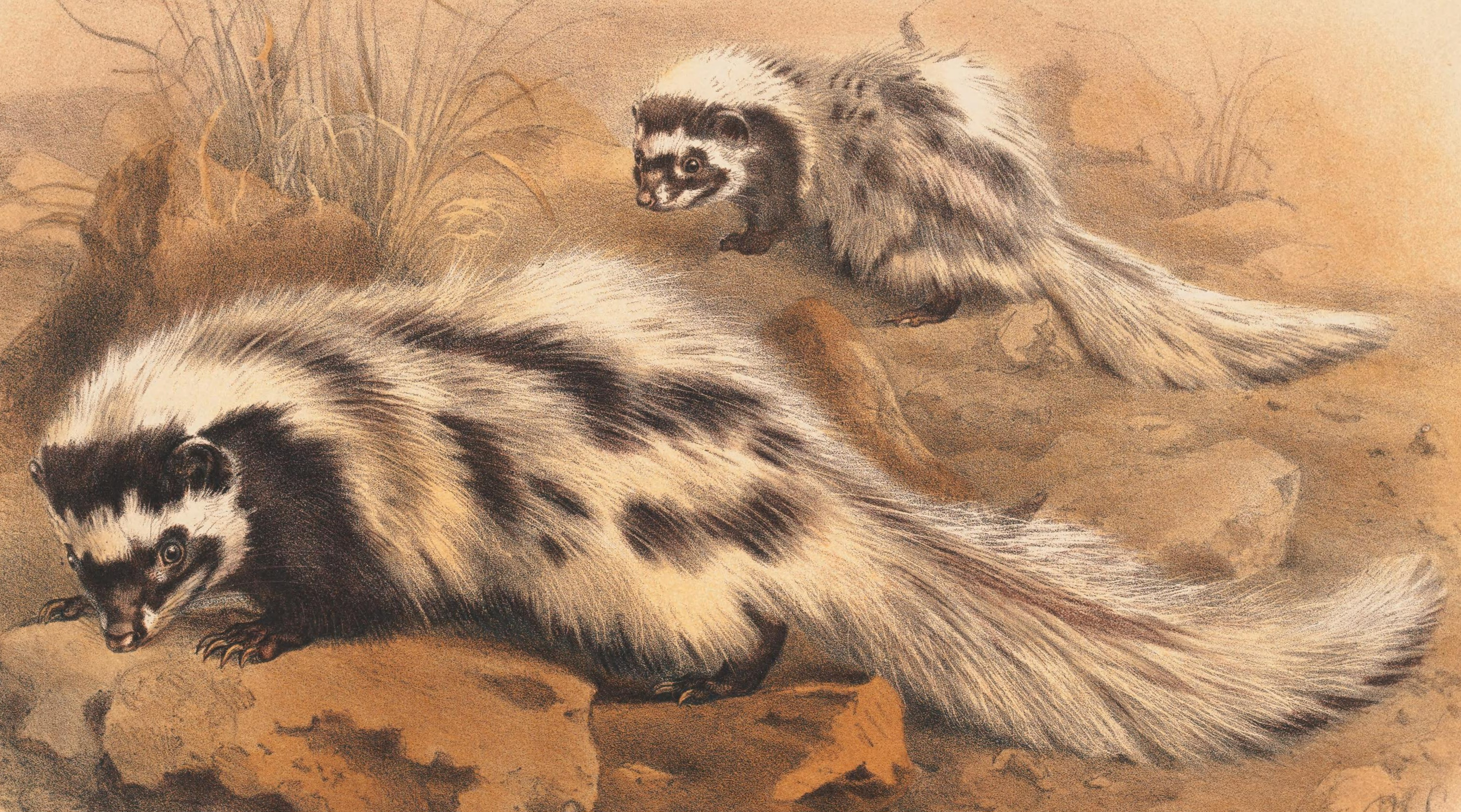
- Illustration of a pair from Egypt

Conservation status
- Least Concern (IUCN 3.1)

Scientific classification
- Kingdom: Animalia
- Phylum: Chordata
- Class: Mammalia
- Order: Carnivora
- Family: Mustelidae
- Genus: Poecilictis; Thomas & Hinton, 1920
- Species: P. libyca

Binomial name
- Poecilictis libyca (Hemprich & Ehrenberg, 1833)

Subspecies
- See text
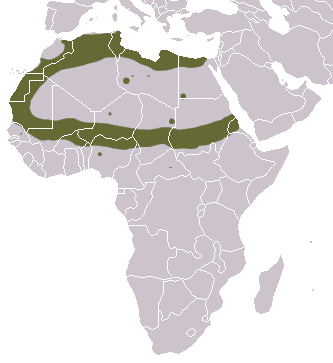
- Saharan striped polecat range

Synonyms
- List: Mustela libyca Hemprich & Ehrenberg, 1833; Rhabdogale multivittata Wagner, 1841; Ictonyx frenata Sundevall, 1843; Poecilictis rothschildi Thomas & Hinton, 1920

= Saharan striped polecat =

Saharan striped polecat Temporal range: Late Pliocene - recent, 2.8–0 Ma

Carnivore in Sahara

The Saharan striped polecat (Poecilictis libyca), also known as the Saharan striped weasel and Libyan striped weasel, is a species of mammal native to northern Africa. It belongs in the family Mustelidae, and debate exists among experts over what genus it belongs to; though formerly placed in Ictonyx along with the striped polecat, it is now placed in the lone member of a separate genus called Poecilictis. Genetic analysis has shown that its closest living relatives are the striped polecat and African striped weasel. It mainly inhabits dry, steppe-like environments with sparse bush cover along the edges of the Sahara desert and on its mountains, avoiding the most arid regions in its center. Occasionally, it is found in oases, woodlands and cultivated land. As a secretive animal, it has likely been overlooked in parts of its range, and sightings of it are still made in recent years in locations where it has not been recorded before.

Measuring 23–29 cm (9–11 in) in length excluding the tail, this species is a small, slender animal with short legs and a bushy tail. It tends to have a black face, underside and legs, with white facial patterns, a light-coloured back and flanks, and dark stripes running down its back. However, the exact colouration and patterning is highly variable between different individuals, and multiple subspecies have been established based on these differences. Fur length is also variable, with the light fur in some populations growing so long that it partly obscures the back stripes, making them appear to have spots or patches. Unlike its closest relatives, the Saharan striped polecat has fur on the undersides of its paws, likely as an adaptation to its sandy habitat. It has glands near its anus which can spray a noxious fluid at potential predators so that the animal can defend itself. Its striking colouration is an example of aposematism, warning predators of its spray to deter them from attacking. It is also highly aggressive to species it views as threats, including humans, commonly hissing and spitting at them rather than fleeing immediately. Sometimes, it will also feign death to avoid predation.

This animal is a capable digger, using its claws to excavate burrows for shelter. It is nocturnal and retreats into these burrows during the day, though it also inhabits crevices in rocks or burrows made by other animals. By night, it hunts for the small animals which it kills with a bite to the back of the skull. It mainly preys on lizards, but will also take insects, birds, eggs and small mammals. Captive individuals are also known to eat small amounts of plant matter. Because of its aggressive defensive behaviour and spray, most predators likely avoid preying on it, with the Pharaoh eagle-owl hunting it the most regularly. It may also compete with other mustelids such as the striped polecat and least weasel. A solitary animal, the Saharan striped polecat tends to live alone in the wild, but captive individuals can reportedly be kept together without fighting. The mating season is likely variable, and females give birth in a burrow to a litter of two to six young after a gestation period of 37 days to 11 weeks. Though categorized as a least-concern species by the IUCN, little research has been done on its population. Considering the pressure it faces from the loss and modification of its habitat, human–wildlife conflict, harvest for traditional medicine, and feral dogs, this species may actually be threatened.

== Taxonomy and evolution ==
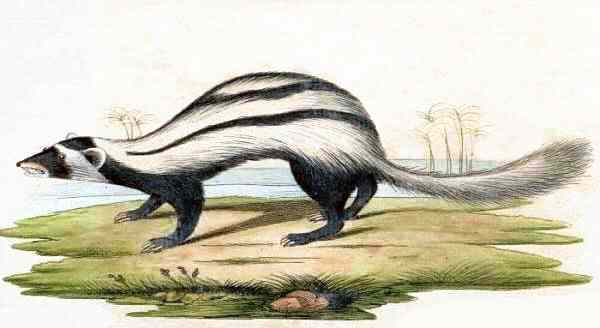
Illustration made before 1875 of a Saharan striped polecat

The Saharan striped polecat was scientifically named in 1833, when German biologists Wilhelm Hemprich and Christian Gottfried Ehrenberg reported that a species of mammal similar to the striped polecat (but differing in its patterning and smaller size) had been discovered in Libya. At the time, the striped polecat was assigned to the genus Mustela, so they assigned this new species to the same genus under the name Mustela libyca, with the specific name referencing its country of origin. A separate genus named Ictonyx was later established in 1835, originally containing only the striped polecat. The Saharan striped polecat would later be moved into this genus as well, being referred to as Ictonyx libyca for years, but a paper published in 2013 pointed out that because the generic name Ictonyx is masculine, the specific name should be spelled as libycus instead when this species is treated as a member of Ictonyx.

The genus placement of the Saharan striped weasel has been a matter of debate among experts. The assignment of this species to Ictonyx was first contested in 1920, when British zoologists Oldfield Thomas and Martin Hinton concluded that it is sufficiently distinct from the striped polecat to warrant placing it in a separate genus. They therefore erected the genus Poecilictis, of which the Saharan striped weasel became the type species, being renamed as Poecilictis libyca. The name of this genus combines the Ancient Greek words "poikilos" (ποικίλος, meaning "vari-colored" or "pied") and "iktis" (ἴκτις, meaning "weasel"), in reference to the animal's black and white patterning.

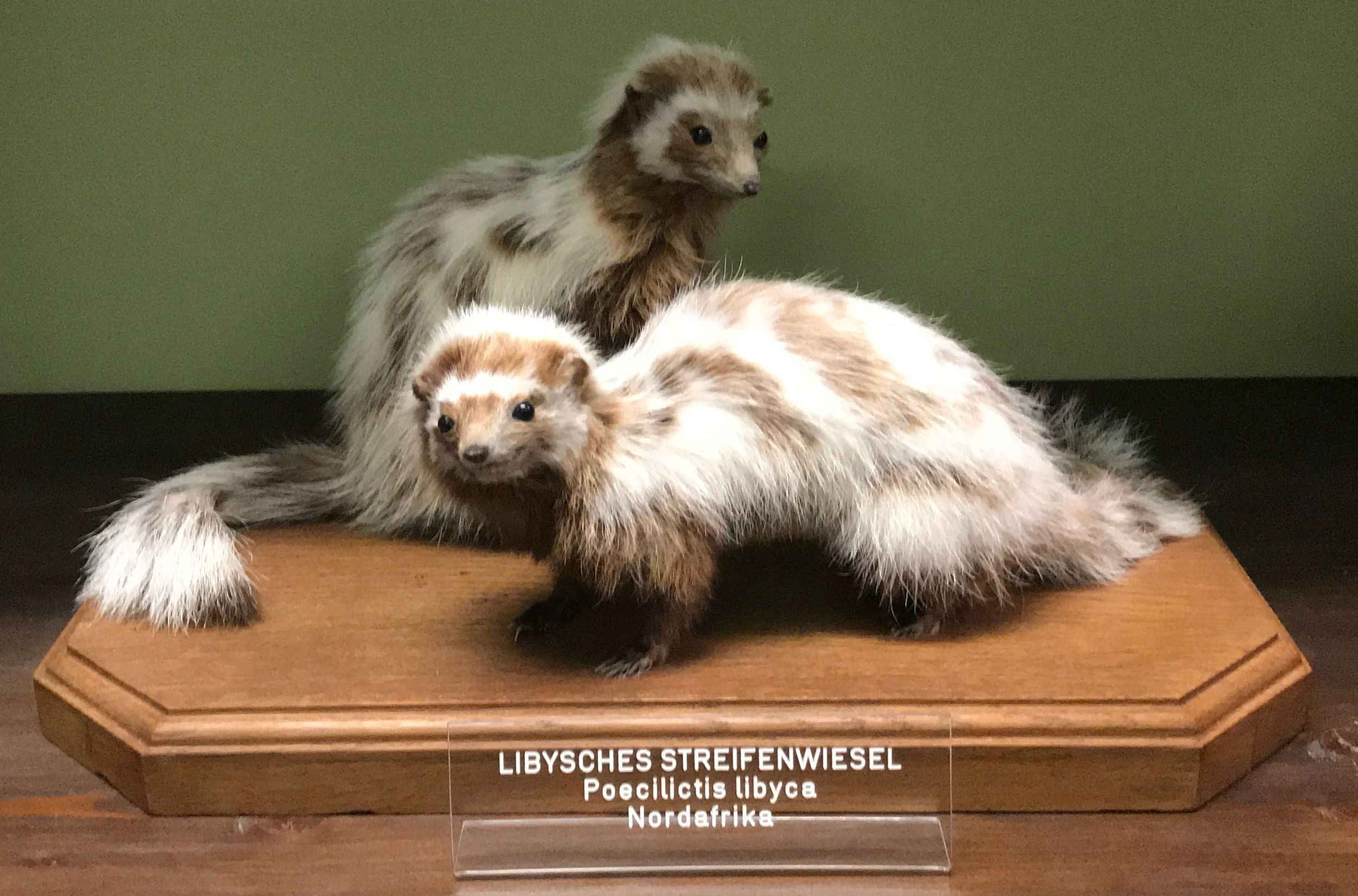
Two mounted taxidermy specimens displayed in the Natural History Museum, Vienna; note that the colour of the fur has faded slightly.

Many later authors would accept the usage of this genus, with American paleontologist George Gaylord Simpson using it in a book published in 1945, in addition to British naturalists John Ellerman and Terence Morrison-Scott using it in a checklist of mammals published in 1951. On the contrary, French zoologist Pierre Louis Dekeyser and German zoologist Jochen Niethammer rejected the usage of Poecilictis in their studies published in 1950 and 1987 respectively, referring to the Saharan striped polecat as an Ictonyx species, and this classification was followed in the third edition of Mammal Species of the World published in 2005. With the advancement of genetic analysis, molecular studies conducted in the 21st Century have found that assigning the Saharan striped polecat and the striped polecat as the two only species of Ictonyx would make this genus paraphyletic. This can be resolved by either adding the African striped weasel into Ictonyx (as proposed in a 2008 study) or separating the Saharan striped weasel into Poecilictis (as supported by a study published in 2012). ASM followed the latter and moved this species to the genus Poecilictis.

=== Subspecies ===
Several forms of the Saharan striped polecat were originally named as separate species, but are now thought to actually represent a single, highly variable species. Some of these former species are now considered subspecies of the Saharan striped polecat, while others are considered as junior synonyms of these subspecies. The following four subspecies were recognized in the third edition of Mammal Species of the World published in 2005:

Subspecies	Trinomial authority	Description	Range	Synonyms
I. l. libyca (Nominate subspecies)	Hemprich and Ehrenberg, 1833	Smaller subspecies with irregular and indistinct patterning, and a black tail tip.	Egypt and Libya	alexandrae Setzer, 1959
I. l. multivittata	Wagner, 1841	Variable in size, with more distinct patterns than the nominate subspecies. Tail tip may be black or white.	Morocco, Algeria, Tunisia, Western Sahara, central Sudan and possibly east Chad	frenata Sundevall, 1842 vaillanti (Loche, 1856)
I. l. oralis	Thomas and Hinton, 1920	Larger than the nominate subspecies, with similarly indistinct patterning and black tail tip.	Coastal areas of Sudan	
I. l. rothschildi	Thomas and Hinton, 1920	Small subspecies with thin fur, distinct patterning and a black tail tip. Skull more robust than that of I. l. multivittata.	Southwestern areas of the Sahara Desert and northern Nigeria	

=== Evolution ===
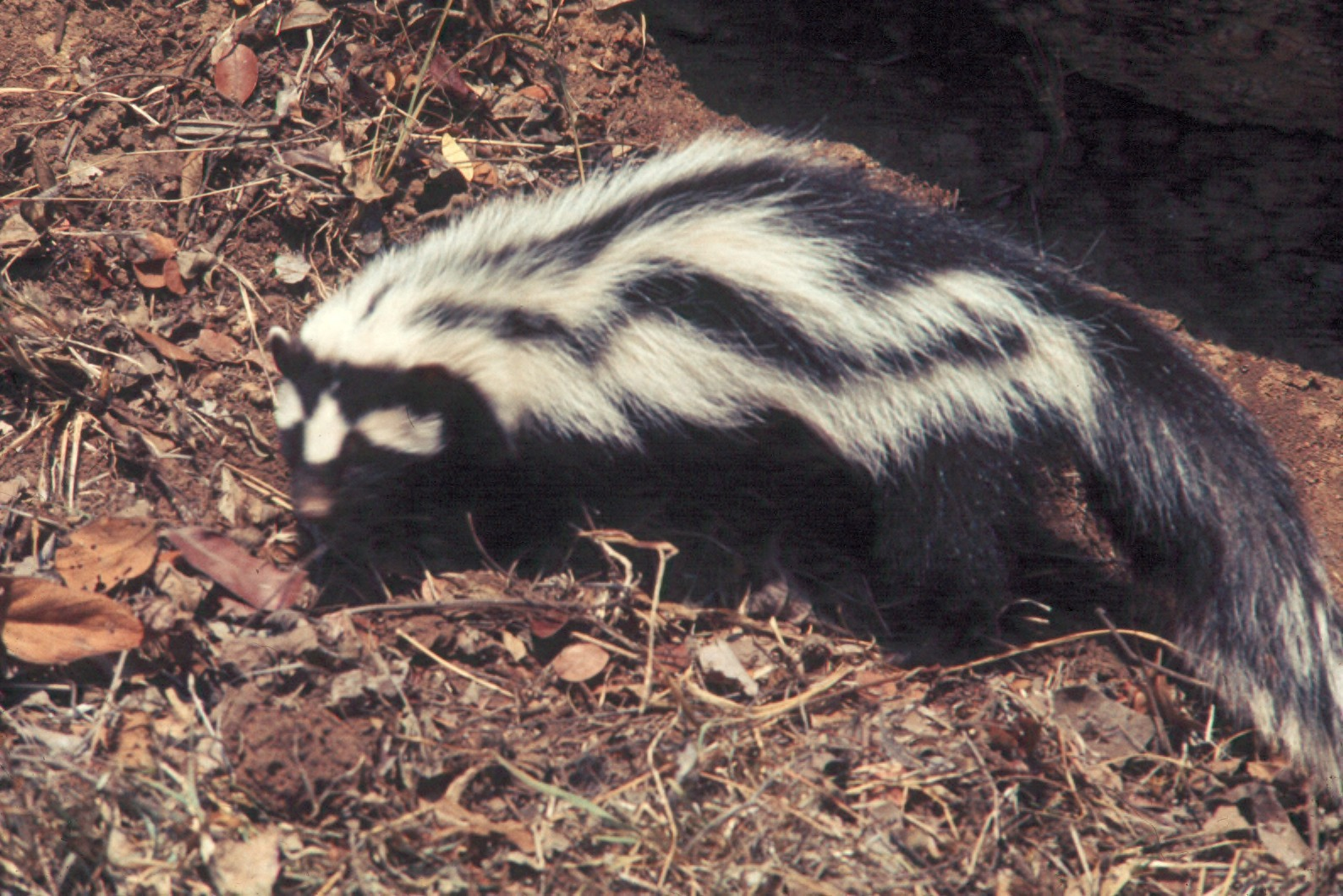
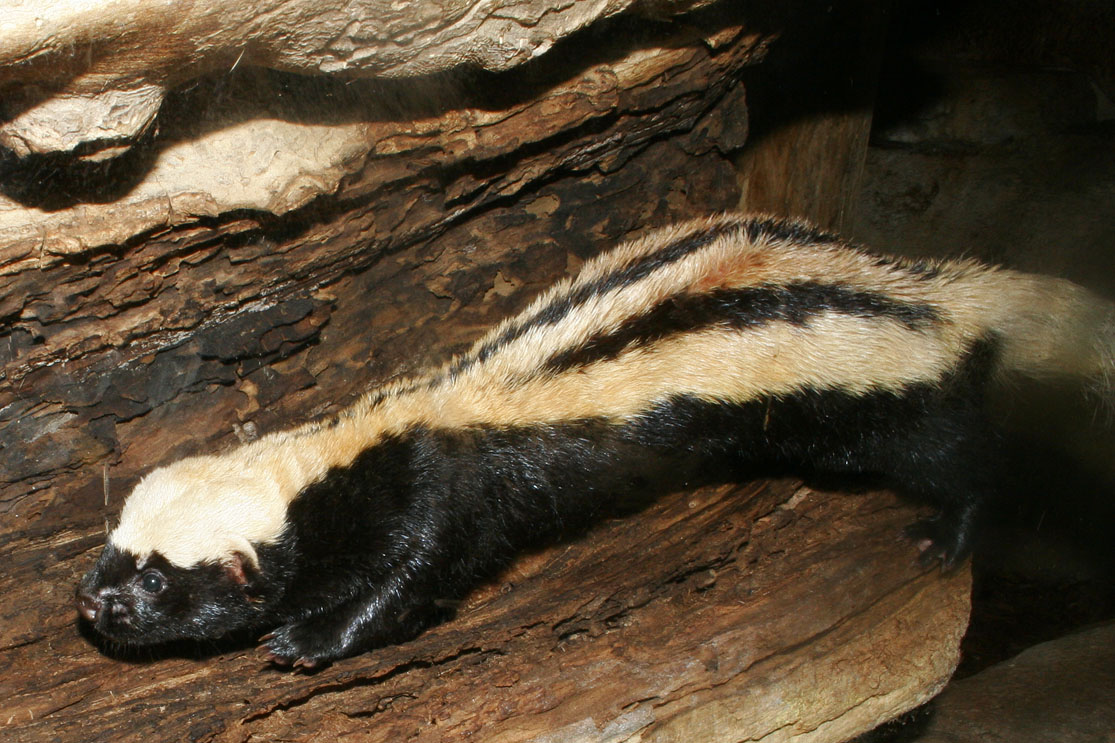
The striped polecat (top) and African striped weasel (bottom) are the closest living relatives of the Saharan striped polecat.

The Saharan striped polecat belongs to the Mustelidae, and more specifically to a subfamily Ictonychinae. Members of this subfamily are split into two tribes known as Ictonychini and Lyncodontini. This species is a member of the former tribe, which also includes the striped polecat, African striped weasel and marbled polecat. Results of genetic analyses indicate that the closest living relatives of the Saharan striped polecat are the striped polecat and African striped weasel. These two species form a clade which is the sister group to the lineage whose only living species is the Saharan striped polecat. A study published in 2008 suggested that the lineages of these two groups diverged between 3.5 and 3 million years ago, and hypothesized that an increase in aridity was the reason it occurred. However, a 2012 study proposed an earlier date between 4.8 and 4.5 million years ago for this divergence. The following cladogram shows the position of the Saharan striped polecat among its closest living relatives

- Ictonychinae
  - Galictis vittata (Greater grison)
  - - Vormela peregusna (Marbled polecat)
    - - Ictonyx libycus (Saharan striped polecat)
      - - Ictonyx striatus (Striped polecat)
        - Poecilogale albinucha (African striped weasel)

Fossilized remains of Saharan striped polecats have been discovered in Pliocene and Pleistocene-aged deposits in northern Africa. The first to be discovered originate from Ahl al Oughlam, a site in Morocco preserving fossils that date back between 2.8 and 2.4 million years ago. This age range spans from the Piacenzian stage of the Late Pliocene across the Pliocene-Pleistocene boundary into the Gelasian stage of the Early Pleistocene. In 1997, some fossils closely resembling bones of modern Saharan striped polecats were reported from this site, being distinguished just by their smaller size. A prehistoric subspecies named Poecilictis libyca minor was therefore established based on these specimens. At the site of Tighennif, Algeria, some fossilized teeth and jaw fragments comparable to those of the Saharan striped polecat have been discovered. These have been labelled as Poecilictis cf. libyca since although they likely represent the modern species, the material is too fragmentary for conclusive identification. The exact age of the Tighennif deposits is not known, but they are believed to have formed about 1 million years ago during the Calabrian stage of the Pleistocene epoch.

== Characteristics ==
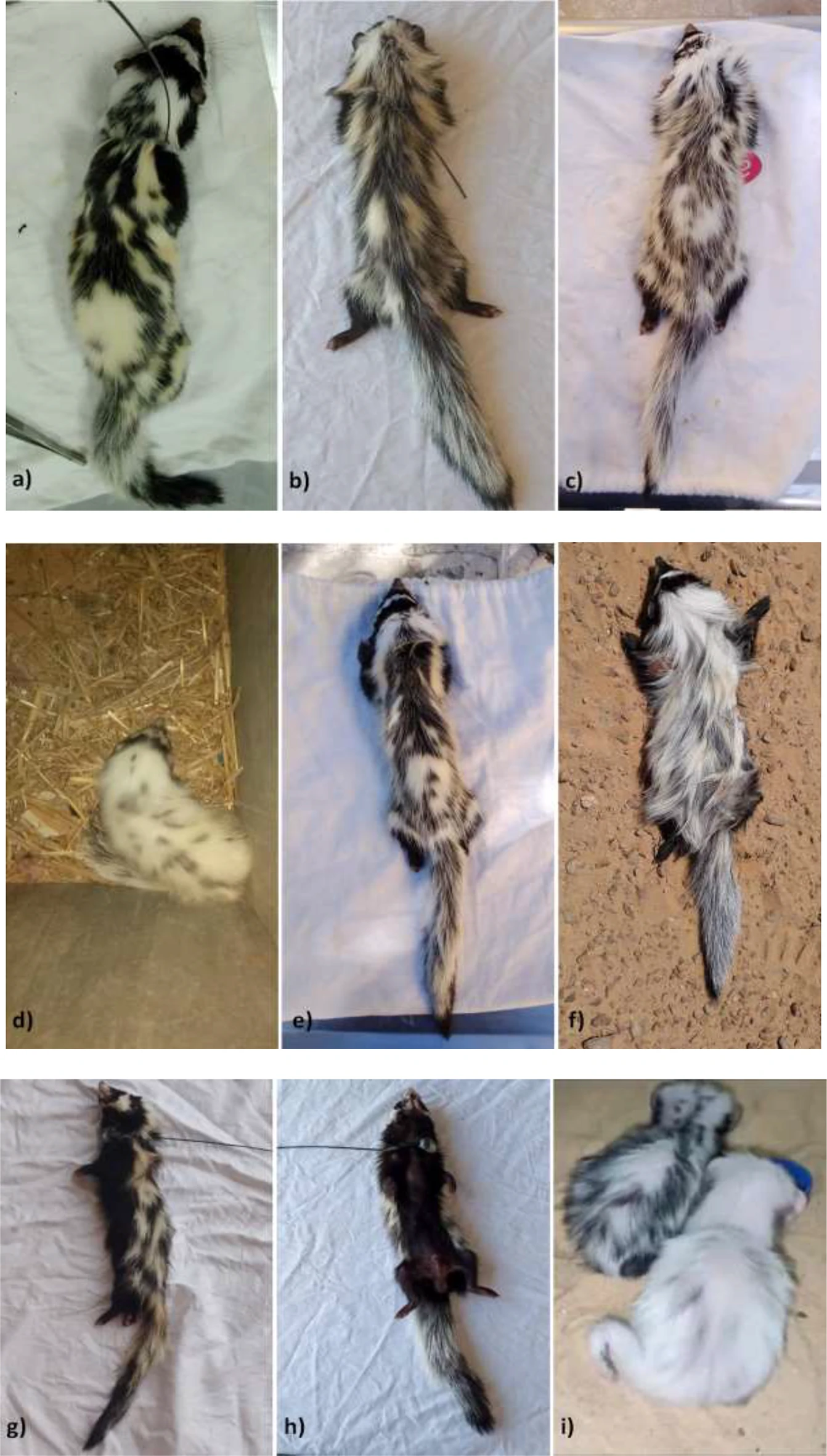
Tranquilised individuals showing the variety of fur lengths and patterns in the species

The Saharan striped polecat is a small mammal, growing about 23–29 cm (9.1–11.4 in) in head-body length and 240–390 g (8.5–13.8 oz) in weight. Although there is no significant variation in body length between the two sexes, males tend to weigh more than females, in addition to having larger front paws and longer canine teeth. This species has a slender body with short legs, and its long tail adds an additional 12–19 cm (4.7–7.5 in) to its overall length. lts fur is erectile, fluffing out when the animal is excited, which makes it look larger when it does so. The fur consists of two main types of hair, namely a short, dense underfur and long, stout guard hairs. Hair length varies greatly between the different subspecies, and those with longer hair have a shaggy appearance. The guard hairs on the tail are notably long, making the tail appear bushy. Like some other mustelids, this species has glands near its anus which spray a noxious fluid when it feels threatened. The head of a Saharan striped polecat bears a short snout and small ears. The paws are rather narrow in form and most of the digits are spaced widely apart, though the third and fourth digits of each hind paw are closer together. Each paw has five digits and each digit bears a claw, with the front claws being longer than the hind claws. Although its two closest living relatives (the striped polecat and African striped weasel) have paws with mostly hairless undersides, those of the Saharan striped polecat differ in having thick hair on their soles. This believed to be an adaptation for the animal's sandy habitat, as are the smaller paw pads. Females bear two pairs of nipples, both of which are classified as inguinal (groin region) nipples.

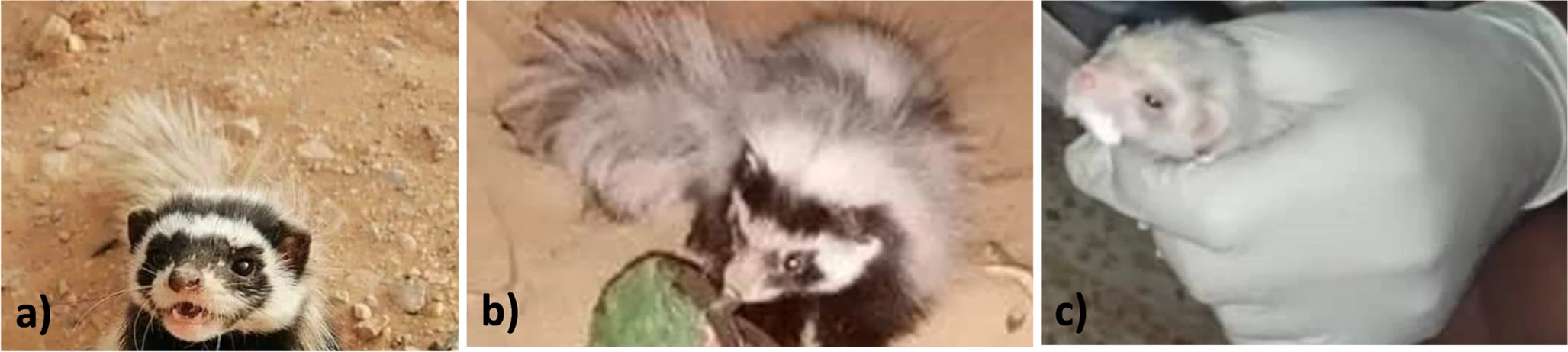
"Standard" facial pattern of the Saharan striped polecat (a) and two examples of rarer facial pattern variants (b and c)

The exact colouration and patterning varies greatly between different subspecies and populations. The limbs and undersides are black or brownish, though isolated white spots may be present. In contrast, the back and flanks are mostly a much lighter colour, which may be white, buff or even orange (as observed in some Egyptian individuals). Three dark stripes generally stretch from behind the ears down the animal's back, the middle one splitting into two or three extra stripes, and merge together at the rump. In some subspecies, the white guard hairs on the back are longer and partly obscure these stripes. This makes their patterning less distinct, and they appear to have spots or patches instead of stripes. The face of a Saharan striped polecat bears distinctive patterns, including a white ring which goes around the mostly black face. This ring stretches under the mouth and between the eyes and ears. The ears are black, though in some individuals their tips may be white. Most individuals have a similar "standard" facial pattern, with a 2025 study finding that only one of the 165 sampled adults had a differing facial pattern, in addition to a juvenile with distinctly light colouration which nearly lacks the pattern altogether. In certain populations the snout is also black, and the area directly behind it (which bears the whiskers) is white. The facial patterns can be used to distinguish this species from the related striped polecat, in which the white facial pattern is commonly split into two cheek patches and a forehead spot. The tail has variable black and white patterning, but its tip and underside are usually black.

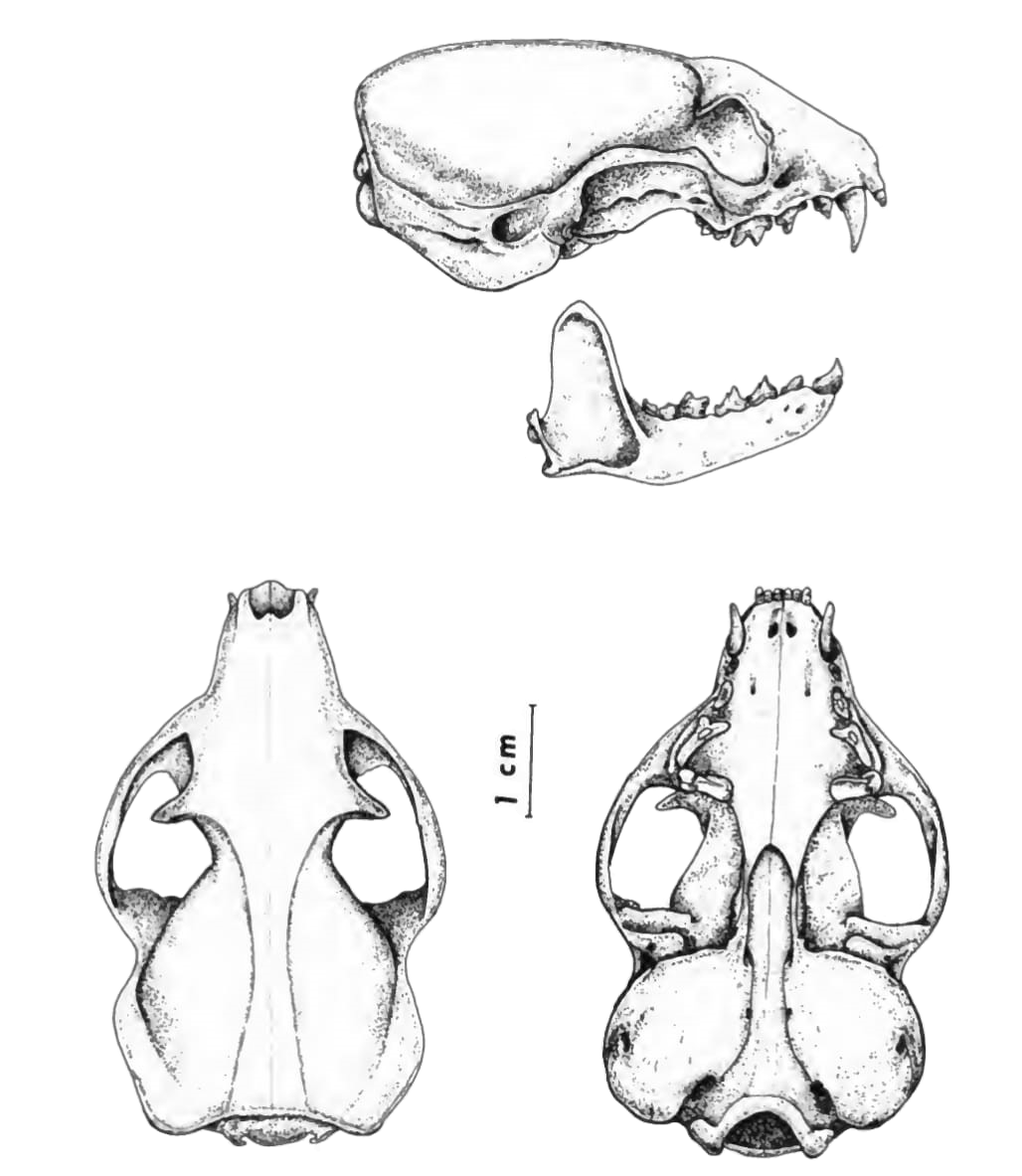
Illustration of the skull seen from the side (top), above (bottom left) and below (bottom right)

The skull is wide and short, with a vaguely triangular shape when viewed from above. Though absent in those of adults, the skulls of juveniles have visible sutures. The sagittal crest is low and wide in juveniles but becomes slightly higher and narrower as the animal matures. Overall, the skull of this species mostly resembles that of the striped polecat, but differs in its smaller size (as the Saharan striped polecat is a smaller animal overall). The tympanic and mastoid bullae (bony structures on the underside of the skull) are proportionally much larger than those of the striped polecat, with the bullae of the two species being about the same absolute size. As the tympanic bullae contain the middle and inner ear, this may suggest the animal has a keen sense of hearing. In addition, the mastoid and postorbital processes (projections of bone at the back of the skull and behind the eye sockets respectively) are smaller in the Saharan striped polecat. The dentition of the Saharan striped polecat is similar to that of the striped polecat. In both species, the outer incisor teeth of the upper jaw are longer than the inner ones, being used alongside the canines to subdue prey. Furthermore, both have sharp carnassial teeth for shearing flesh.

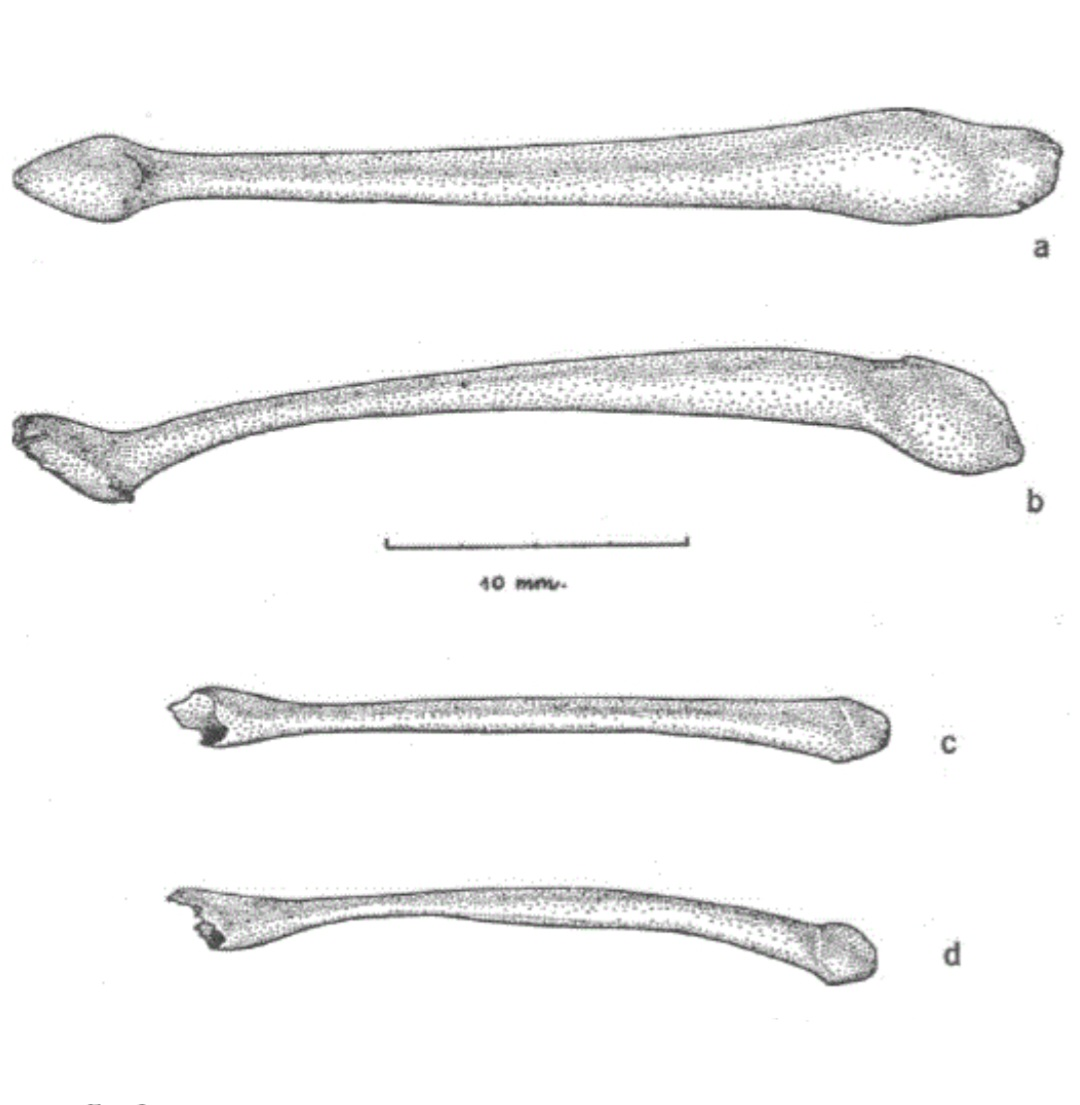
Illustration of the bacula of adult (a and b) and immature (c and d) males

Males of this species possess a baculum (penis bone). In one adult male, this bone measured 3.28 cm (1.29 in) in length, making it rather robust and large for the animal's size. The baculum of an adult has a wrinkled texture at its base and a teardrop-shaped tip that angles away from the shaft. The upper side of the shaft is mostly convex, with an indistinct hint of a groove where the urethra would fit into visible only near the base. In immature males, the baculum is smaller and the wrinkled texture at the base has not yet developed. Furthermore, the shape of the tip instead resembles a cup, as the bone has not yet fully formed.

== Distribution and habitat ==
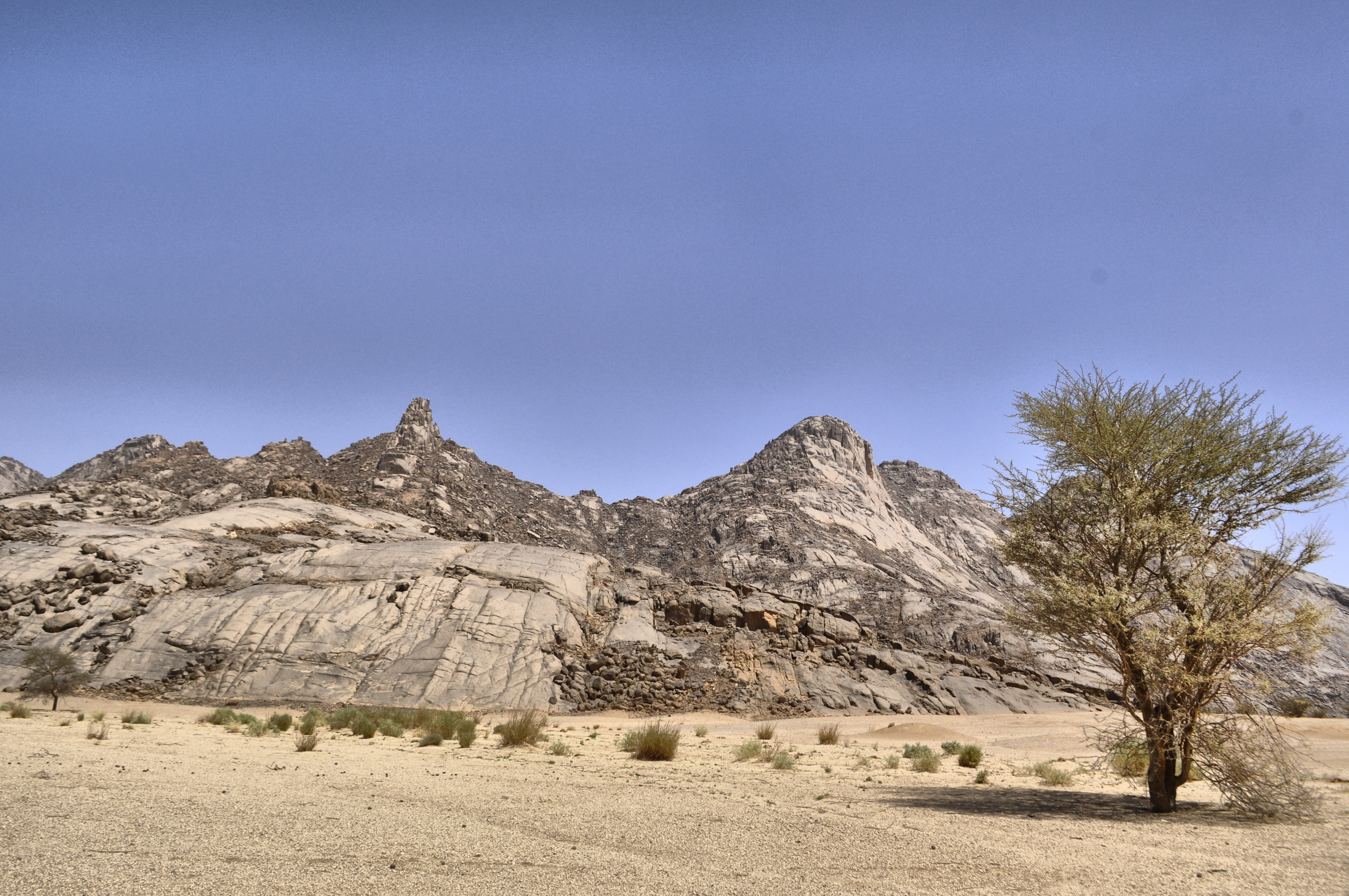
Semi-desert environment in southern Algeria, where the Saharan striped polecat is known to occur

Native to northern Africa, the Saharan striped polecat is known to occur around the northern and southern edges of the Sahara Desert. It is found in Mauritania, Western Sahara and Morocco in the west along the Mediterranean coast of North Africa to the Nile Valley in Egypt, while in the south its range includes the Sahel east to Sudan and Djibouti. It is also known outside of the African mainland, occurring on Farwa Island in the Mediterranean Sea. However, it has only been researched very little compared to other small carnivorans in the region, with few studies being done on its range and habits. Furthermore, this animal is secretive in nature, and is therefore likely to be under-recorded and overlooked. This is supported by the fact that records of Saharan striped polecats have been made in recent years in locations where they were formerly unknown. These include a body found near the Atlantic coast of Morocco in 2018, an individual captured in southern Algeria in 2020, and multiple sightings from Tunisia throughout the early 21st Century. Between 2017 and 2025, it was sighted and photographed at multiple locations in southwestern Libya.

The Saharan striped polecat prefers steppe-like environments and lives on the margins and mountains of the Sahara desert. Arid, rocky terrain and sandy semi-deserts are its preferred habitat, but it does rarely occur in woodlands. Oases and cultivated areas are also known habitats for this species. Most areas it inhabits have only sparse or very sparse plant cover that mostly consists of small bushes. It is most often found in dry areas where the annual rainfall is below 15 cm (5.9 in), but it does not inhabit the driest areas of the central Sahara. It can also be found in coastal dunes where rainfall can be as high as 25 cm (9.8 in).

== Behaviour and biology ==
The Saharan striped polecat is nocturnal, with activity beginning at dusk. It hides during the day in burrows, capable of digging simple tunnels in the soil using its claws, though it also uses burrows made by other animals. One burrow found in Niger measured about 3 m (9.8 ft) in length and reached a depth of 70 cm (28 in) below the surface, with a small chamber at its end. Aside from burrows, rock crevices are also used as shelter. It moves about in the open in a slow, deliberate way, with its tail held vertically. It is a mostly solitary. However, pairs can reportedly be kept together in captivity without exhibiting aggression towards each other. Though the Saharan striped polecat lives predominantly on the ground, it is capable of climbing branches or the wire netting of cages.

=== Reproduction ===
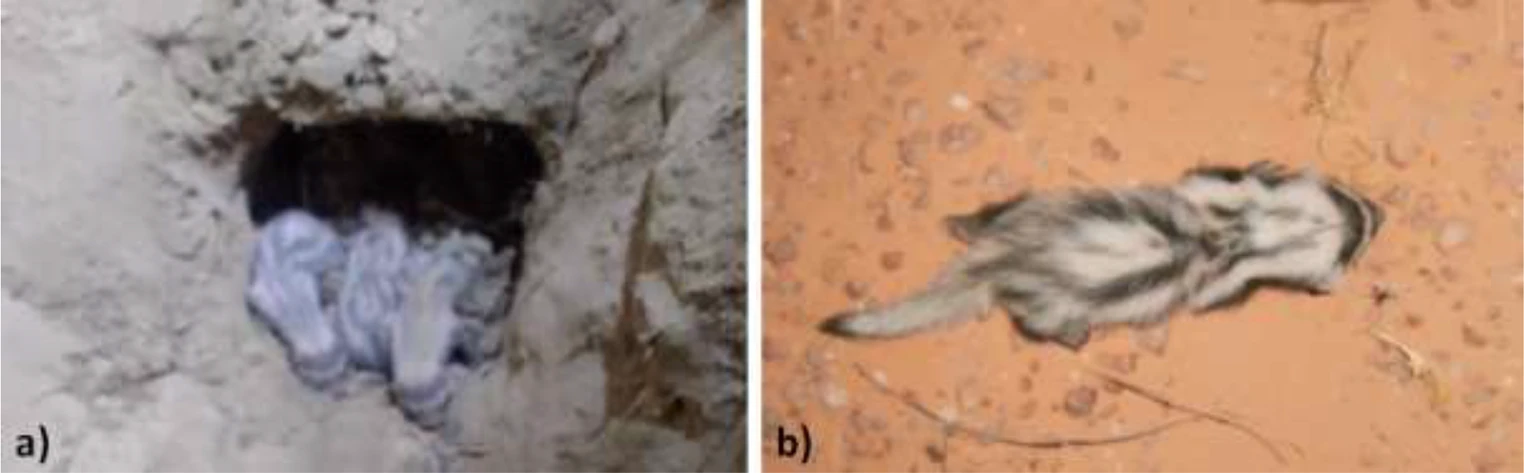
Three juveniles aged two to three weeks (a) and an older juvenile aged four to five weeks (b)

The Saharan striped polecat's mating season is not precisely known; sightings of young individuals have been reported in the months of April, August and November. The exact timing of breeding varies between different regions, with populations in Tunisia giving birth from March to May, whereas those in Egypt and West Africa tend to do so from January to March. The gestation period may be just 37 days, which is exceptionally short for a carnivoran, but is not known for certain and could also be as long as 11 weeks. After this, the mother generally gives birth to a litter of two to three young in spring, though larger litters of as many as six young have also been recorded. The newborns are altricial, with their eyes closed but ears open, and have very short whitish fur. One pair born in captivity weighed only 5 g (0.18 oz) each at birth, with body lengths of just 6.3 cm (2.5 in). Birth takes place inside a chamber at the end of a burrow. In 1974, British mammalogist Donovan Reginald Rosevear claimed that the burrow is left unlined such that the young are born onto the bare soil. However, a 2025 study instead states that the female lines her burrow with shreds of grass or fabric before she gives birth. The distinctive dark patterns of this species develop at an age of three weeks, and the eyes open about half a week after that. At five weeks old, the young begin to eat solid food. The mother carries her young by the neck, doing so until they reach two months of age, and another month later the mother and young separate. Females are capable of having another litter as soon as 40 days after the previous litter was born, with one captive female doing so after her first litter died early.

=== Defense ===
The Saharan striped polecat is very aggressive towards species it perceives as threats including humans. Because of this, even captive individuals are reportedly difficult to handle unless they are asleep, as they do not wake up immediately. It tends to face its attacker instead of fleeing instantly, sometimes hissing and spitting if agitated. It also raises and fluffs out its fur to appear larger, lifts its tail upwards and turns around such that its anus is pointed at its aggressor. If the perceived threat continues to approach, it sprays a noxious fluid from glands near its anus. Its distinct black and white patterning is an example of aposematism, warning predators of its aggressive behaviour and pungent spray, discouraging them from attacking it. In addition, it may sometimes feign death to avoid predation, lying motionless on the ground with its tongue out and eyes closed.

== Ecology ==
=== Diet and hunting ===
Like other mustelids, this species is a predatory animal, and lizards make up most of its diet. An individual from Wadi El Natrun in Egypt captured in 1903 reportedly had a preference for eating these reptiles over all other food. It also feeds on eggs, birds, insects and small mammals, with rodents of the genus Gerbillus being the most commonly taken mammalian prey. It sometimes preys on poultry belonging to local people. It can feed on small amounts of plant matter in captivity like grated vegetables, boiled cereals and seeds along with chopped meat. It tracks its prey by scent and digs it out of burrows, and although it normally moves slowly, it can move quite rapidly and pounce quickly when pursuing prey. When making a kill, it bites into the back of the prey's skull. Due to its high metabolic rate, this animal must feed frequently and can exist only in areas with high prey density.

=== Predators, parasites and competitors ===
This species is a short-lived animal, with captive individuals recorded to have a lifespan of up to six years. Owing to its aggression and defensive spray, most predators likely avoid targeting it. The Pharaoh eagle-owl is believed to be its main predator, as skulls of this mustelid have been discovered in this owl's pellets, and remains of individuals killed by this bird have also been found. Though not for food, humans sometimes kill Saharan striped polecats for usage in witchcraft or accidentally during road collisions. However, there exists strong prejudice in some areas against digging this mustelid out of its burrow, as this often results in it spraying the person who does so. Other animals which may prey on this species include the African wolf, caracal and birds of prey. The ixodid tick Haemaphysalis erinacei erinacei is a recorded parasite of this mustelid, having been found on an individual being imported for the pet trade in Budapest.

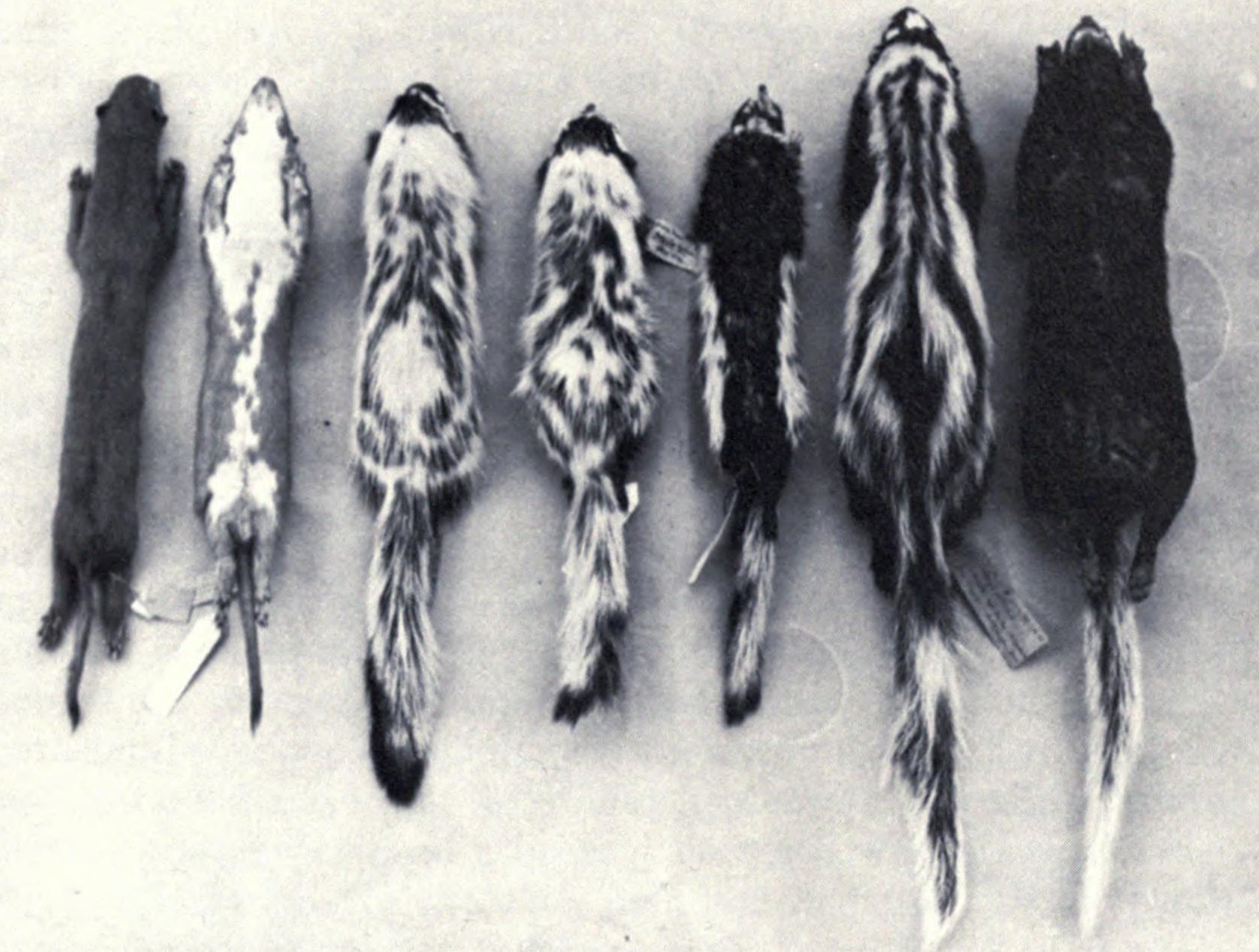
Mustelid specimens collected in Egypt, from left to right: upper and lower views of the least weasel; two upper views and a lower view of the Saharan striped polecat; upper and lower views of the striped polecat

The range of the Saharan striped polecat overlaps with those of two other small mustelid species. In the northern edge of its range, it occurs alongside the least weasel and may compete with it in productive areas. Competition may be reduced by niche partitioning as the least weasel is a diurnal species, whereas the Saharan striped polecat is nocturnal, reducing direct competition between the two. Meanwhile, the larger striped polecat is present in the southern edge of the Saharan striped polecat's range, and is the more abundant of the two species in the areas where they coexist. Unlike the least weasel, the striped polecat is a nocturnal animal. In addition, Saharan striped polecats grow much larger in the northern parts of their range where they may be comparable in size to small striped polecats than in the southern parts (where the two species do not overlap in size). This may indicate that striped polecats compete with Saharan striped polecats more directly.

== Threats and conservation ==
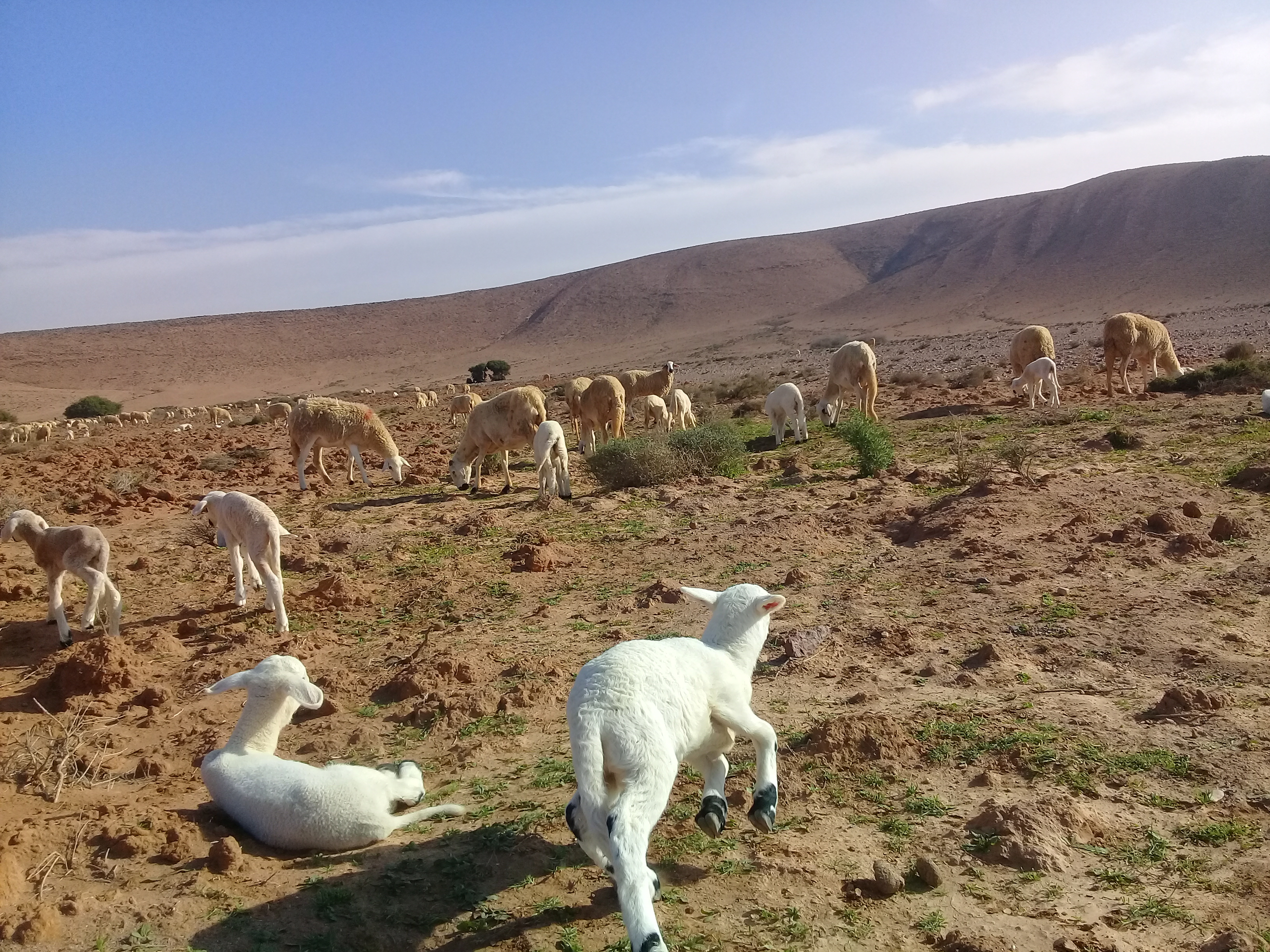
Overgrazing by livestock in its habitat (such as these sheep in Morocco) is one of the threats faced by the Saharan striped polecat.

The Saharan striped polecat has been assessed as Least Concern since 1996, as it is widespread, not uncommon and does not appear to face any major threats. In Tunisia, it is threatened by poaching and may have become locally extinct in some areas, as in northern Tunisia there has not been any confirmed record since 1935. Human–wildlife conflict is a known threat as it sometimes kills chickens belonging to people in rural areas. It is also captured for use in traditional medicine or witchcraft. It is often caught and exploited because of the tribal belief that it may increase male fertility. International trade is also known, with some being sold from Tunisia to Libya. It is also threatened by habitat loss, as much of its natural environment is being modified by the expansion of agriculture and agroforestry, especially in the Mediterranean region. Furthermore, overgrazing by livestock reduces the plant cover that its prey requires, reducing the amount of food available to this mustelid. The expansion of human settlements into the Saharan striped polecat's range also increases the number of feral dogs in the area, which compete with them for prey or kill them directly.

In Morocco, Algeria and Tunisia, the Saharan striped polecat is protected by law. At a national level, it is fully protected in Algeria, though the law which does so has been noted to be applied inconsistently. In Tunisia, it is prohibited to hunt, trade, transport or possess a Saharan striped polecat throughout the year. Further research on its distribution and inclusion into conservation projects is required to better protect it.
