= List of lighthouses in Eritrea =

This is a list of lighthouses in Eritrea.

Name	Year built	Location & coordinates	Class of light	Focal height (metres)	NGA number	Admiralty number	Range (nautical miles)
Assarka Island Lighthouse			Fl W 2s	10	112-30732	D7295.017	9
Difnein Island Lighthouse	1910s		Fl(2) W 10s	44	112-30692	D7295.025	10
Madote Island Lighthouse			Fl W 5s	15	112-30728	D7295.018	9
Massawa Harbor Range Front Lighthouse			F R	12	112-30720	D7295.02	6
Massawa Harbor Range Rear Lighthouse			F R	17	112-30724	D7295.019	8
Ra's Fatuma Lighthouse			Fl(3) W 26s	29	112-30856	D7295	10
Ra's Gombo Lighthouse	1880s		Fl(2) W 10s	23	112-30860	D7295.013	11
Ra's Madur Lighthouse	1914		Iso W 4s	26	112-30700	D7295.023	14
Sha'b Shakhs Lighthouse	1910s		Fl(2) W 22s	38	112-30840	D7295.014	9
Sheikh al Abu Island Lighthouse			Fl W 10s	19	112-30696	D7295.024	9
Shumma Island Lighthouse			Fl(3) W 20s	33	112-30736	D7295.016	9
Umm es Sahrig Island Lighthouse			Fl W 8s	27	112-30832	D7295.015	9

== See also ==
- List of lighthouses in Sudan (to the north-west)
- List of lighthouses in Djibouti (to the south-east)
- Lists of lighthouses and lightvessels
