= List of lighthouses in Kenya =

This is a list of lighthouses in Kenya.

== Lighthouses ==
Name	Image	Year built	Location & coordinates	Class of light	Focal height	NGA number	Admiralty number	Range nml
Cannon Point Lighthouse		n/a	3°57′43.6″S 39°45′46.1″E	Fl W 10s.	19 metres (62 ft)	31204	D6818	11
Chale Island Lighthouse		n/a	4°26′53.5″S 39°32′01.7″E	Fl (2) W 20s.	30 metres (98 ft)	31268	D6770	12
Kilifi Creek Lighthouse		n/a	3°38′00.0″S 39°52′00.0″E (NGA)	Fl W 8s.	40 metres (130 ft)	31200	D6820	9
Kipini Lighthouse		n/a	2°31′48.0″S 40°31′48.0″E (NGA)	Fl W 7s.	29 metres (95 ft)	31188	D6828	10
Likoni Lighthouse		n/a	4°05′00.4″S 39°40′05.9″E	Iso WRG 5s.	21 metres (69 ft)	31236	D6796	2
Malindi Lighthouse		n/a	3°13′30.2″S 40°07′45.8″E (NGA)	Fl W 10s.	25 metres (82 ft)	31192	D6824	14
Mtongwe Range Rear Lighthouse		n/a	4°03′34.9″S 39°38′22.5″E	Fl W 2s.	28 metres (92 ft)	31244	D6794.1	6
Pungutiayu Lighthouse		n/a	4°42′08.4″S 39°24′33.9″E	Fl W 2s.	16 metres (52 ft)	31272	D6769	10
Ra's Kiberamini Range Front Lighthouse		n/a	4°02′50.9″S 39°40′41.5″E	Q W	45 metres (148 ft)	31212	D6774	8
Ra's Kiberamini Range Rear Lighthouse		n/a	4°02′35.2″S 39°40′37.5″E	Fl W 2s.	27 metres (89 ft)	31220	D6774.1	18
Ra's Mchangamwe Range Rear Lighthouse		n/a	4°02′25.9″S 39°38′19.3″E	Fl W 2s.	n/a	31260	D6812.1	6
Ra's Serani Range Front Lighthouse		n/a	4°04′17.7″S 39°40′50.4″E	Q W	26 metres (85 ft)	31208	D6772	8
Ra's Serani Range Rear Lighthouse		n/a	4°04′12.0″S 39°40′41.3″E	Fl W 5s.	45 metres (148 ft)	31212	D6772.1	18
Shela Range Front Lighthouse		n/a	2°17′49.5″S 40°54′47.8″E	Q W	6 metres (20 ft)	31176	D6832	6

== See also ==
- List of lighthouses in Somalia (to the north-east)
- List of lighthouses in Tanzania (to the south)
- Lists of lighthouses and lightvessels
