= List of lighthouses in Djibouti =

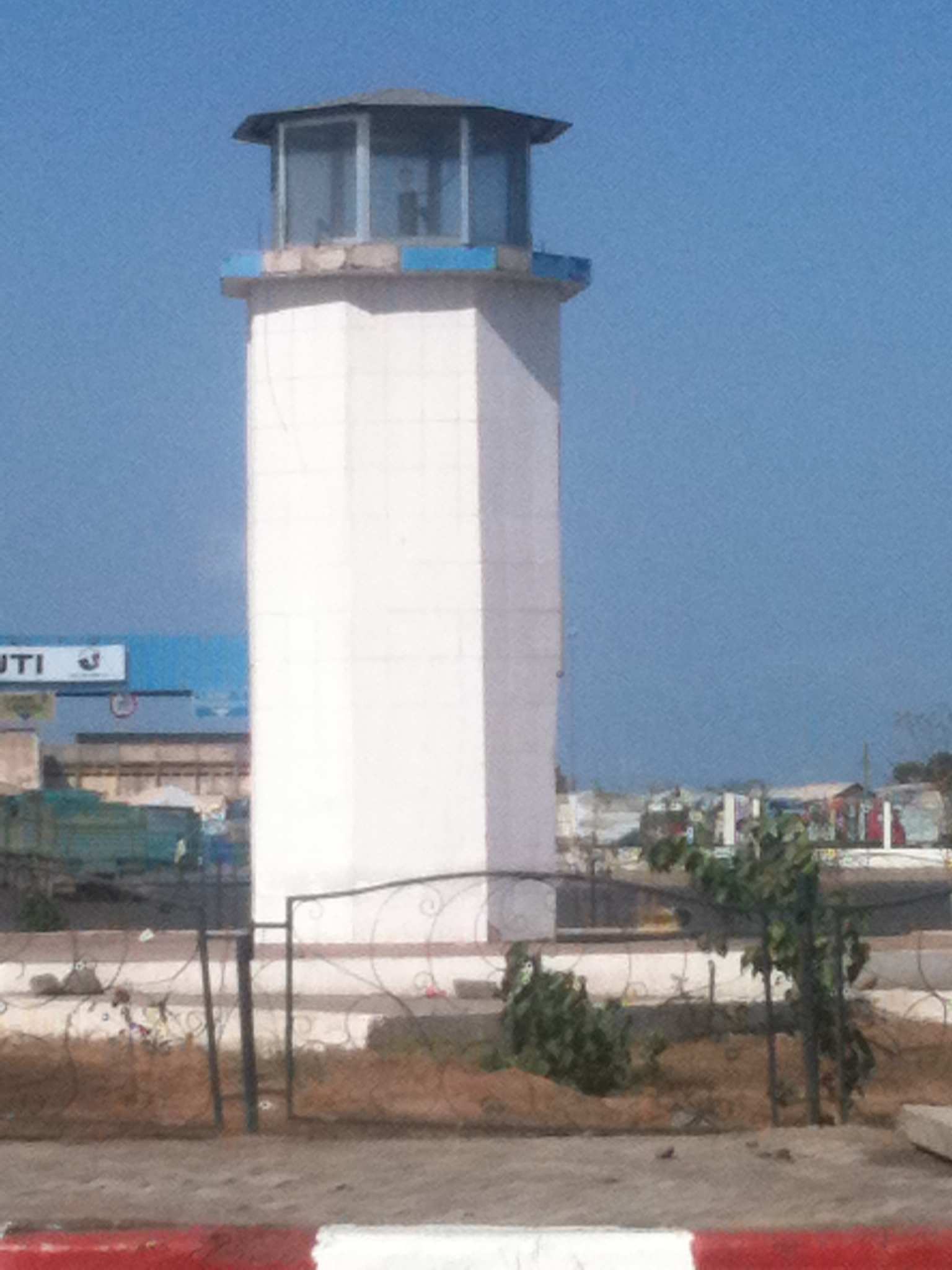
Passe Ouest Lighthouse in Djibouti City has been inactive since 2011.

This is a list of lighthouses in Djibouti.

| Name | Year built | Location & coordinates | Class of light | Focal height (metres) | NGA number | Admiralty number | Range (nautical miles) |
|---|---|---|---|---|---|---|---|
| Ambouli Lighthouse | 1890s | Djibouti City | Q W | 20 | 112-30988 | D7280 | 17 |
| Banc de Salines Lighthouse | | | Fl(3) G 6s | 3 | 112-31032 | D7288 | 2 |
| Fort Ayabele Lighthouse | 1894 | | Q W | 32 | 112-30992 | D7280.1 | 19 |
| Île Maskali Lighthouse | | | Fl(2) W 6s | 24 | 112-30972 | D7276 | 10 |
| Île Moucha Lighthouse | 1890s | | Fl(3) R 12s | 20 | 112-30968 | D7275 | 10 |
| Mole du Fontainbleau Lighthouse | | | F R | 6 | 112-31012 | D7289 | 2 |
| Obock Lighthouse | | | Fl R 4s | 3 | 112-30964 | D7273 | 8 |
| Obock Range Front Lighthouse | | | Q W | 30 | 112-30956 | D7274 | 5 |
| Port du Heron Range Front Lighthouse | | | Q R | 7 | 112-30996 | D7286 | |
| Port du Heron Range Rear Lighthouse | | | Q R | 7 | 112-31000 | D7286.1 | |
| Ra's Bir Lighthouse | 1952 | | Fl(2) W 10s | 74 | 112-30952 | D7272 | 20 |
| Récif d’Ambouli Lighthouse | | | Fl G 4s | 3 | 112-31008 | D7284 | 2 |

== See also ==
- List of lighthouses in Eritrea (to the north)
- List of lighthouses in Somalia (to the south-east)
- Lists of lighthouses and lightvessels
