= El Ikhwa Islands =

Two islands in the Egyptian Red Sea

- Location within Egypt

Geography
- Location: Red Sea
- Coordinates: 26°18′25″N 34°51′20″E
- Total islands: 2

Administration
- Egypt

Big Brother
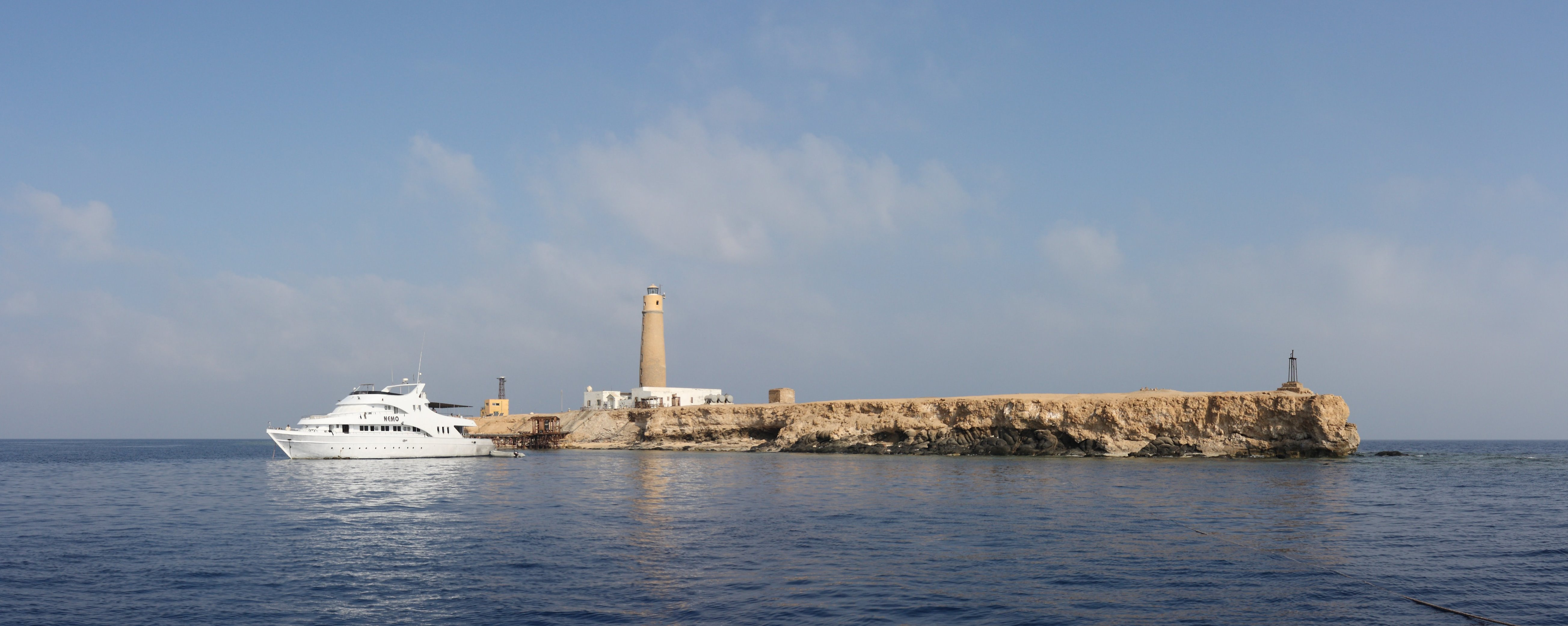
- Big Brother Island
- Interactive map of Big Brother

Geography
- Location: Red Sea, Red Sea Governorate, Egypt
- Area: 0.78 km^{2} (0.30 sq mi)

Administration
- Egypt

Demographics
- Population: 0

Little Brother
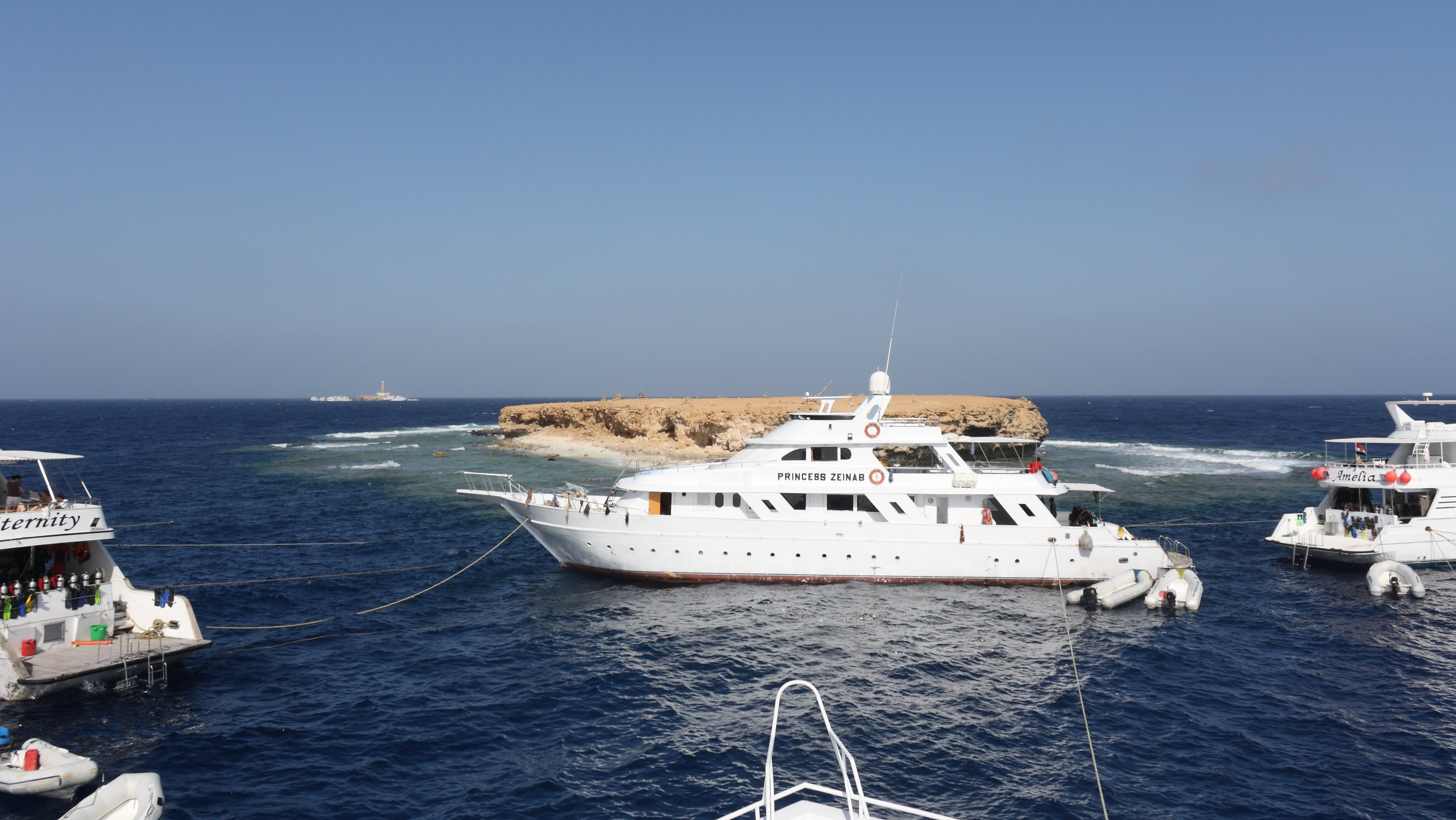
- Small Brother Island
- Interactive map of Little Brother

Geography
- Location: Red Sea
- Area: 0.26 km^{2} (0.10 sq mi)

Administration
- Egypt, Red Sea

El Ikhwa Islands (Arabic: جزر الإخوة lit. islands of brotherhood), commonly known as Brothers Islands, are two small Red Sea islands in the Red Sea Governorate of Egypt.

== Geography ==
They are situated 67 kilometres (42 mi) from El Qoseir on the mainland.

The most prominent feature of the islands is the Brothers Islands Lighthouse built by the British in 1883. Small Brother lies one kilometre (0.6 miles) south from the Big Brother.

== Underwater diving ==
The islands are a dive site featuring corals and two wrecks: Numidia and Aida. The islands are also famed for encounters with oceanic whitetip and hammerhead sharks. However, they are only suitable for very experienced divers due to the islands' isolated position, the challenging dive conditions, and very strong currents. During high season there are many dive safari boats around both islands.

In 2012, Jade Bremner ranked Big Brother ninth in a list of the world's 50 best dive sites, and second in the Red Sea.
