= List of lighthouses in Somalia =

This is a list of lighthouses in Somalia.

== Lighthouses ==
Name	Image	Year built	Location & coordinates	Class of light	Focal height	NGA number	Admiralty number	Range nml
Bosaso Range Rear Lighthouse		n/a	Bosaso; 11°17′09.9″N 49°10′50.2″E	Iso R 4s.	13 metres (43 ft)	31060	D7260.1	10
Cape Guardafui Lighthouse		~1930s	Cape Guardafui; 11°50′08.4″N 51°16′43.9″E	Fl W 5s.	263 metres (863 ft)	31072	D7246	18
Isola dei Serpenti Lighthouse		n/a	Kismayo; 0°22′47.7″S 42°33′16.8″E	Fl W 4s.	35 metres (115 ft)	31160	D6842	12
Hobyo Lighthouse		n/a	Hobyo; 5°21′05.0″N 48°31′44.7″E	Fl (3) W 10s.	32 metres (105 ft)	31088	D7236	10
Jubba River Lighthouse		~1912	Goob Weyn; 0°14′55.5″S 42°37′03.8″E	Fl (2) W 10s.	37 metres (121 ft)	31156	D6852	8
Merca Range Rear Lighthouse		1912 est.	Merca; 1°42′52.8″N 44°46′04.1″E	L Fl W 8.5s.	35 metres (115 ft)	31140	D7212.1	20
Mogadishu Lighthouse		1903 est.	Mogadishu; 2°02′19.3″N 45°19′59.9″E	Fl W 12.5s.	74 metres (243 ft)	31096	D7218	32
Ra's Hafun Lighthouse		n/a	Ras Hafun; 10°26′35.0″N 51°24′50.5″E	Fl (2) W 35s.	107 metres (351 ft)	31076	D7242	4
Chilaani Lighthouse	An ancient Lighthouse in Baraawe							

== See also ==
- List of lighthouses in Djibouti (to the north-west)
- List of lighthouses in Somaliland (autonomous region within Somalia)
- List of lighthouses in Kenya (to the south-west)
- Lists of lighthouses and lightvessels
