= List of lighthouses in Libya =

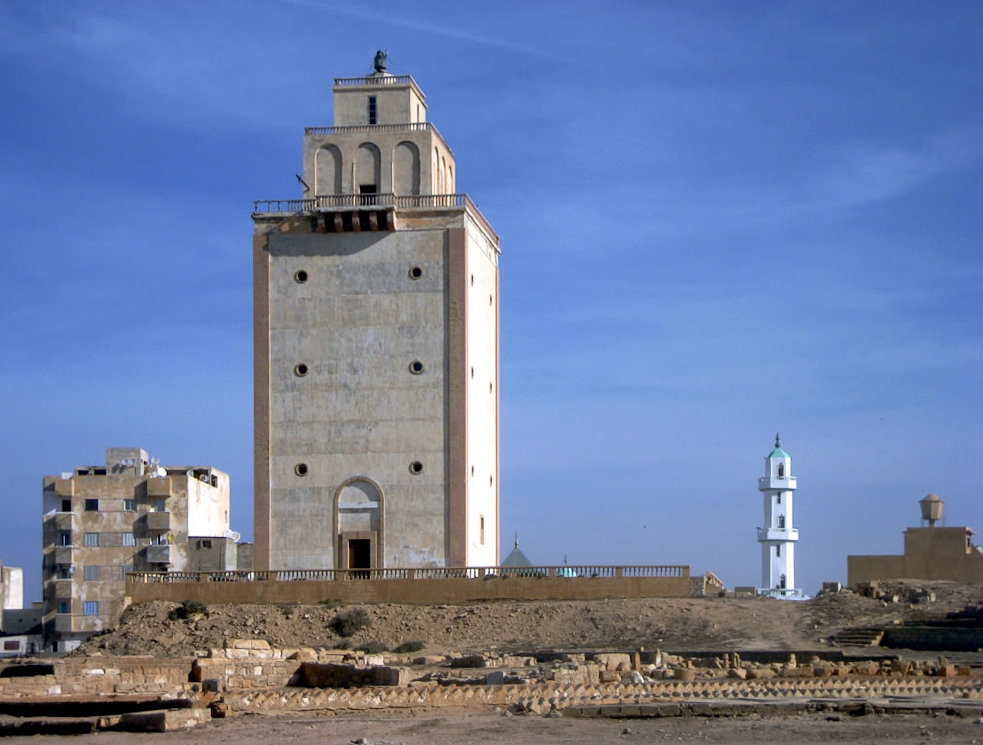
Benghazi Lighthouse

This is a list of lighthouses in Libya, which are all located along the Mediterranean coastline of this North African country. The list includes those maritime lighthouses that are named landfall lights, or that have a range of at least twelve nautical miles. The NGA numbers are from the List of lights publication 113.

== Lighthouses ==
Name	Location coordinates	Year built	Tower height	Focal height	Range nml	NGA number
Al Khoms Lighthouse	Al-Khoms; 32.6570056°N 14.2688340°E	n/a	19 m (62 ft)	26 m (85 ft)	12 nmi (22 km)	21636
Bardia Lighthouse	Bardia; 31.754337°N 25.104381°E	n/a	12 m (39 ft)	98 m (322 ft)	12 nmi (22 km)	21432
Benghazi Lighthouse	Benghazi; 32.12489°N 20.06361°E	1922	22 m (72 ft)	41 m (135 ft)	17 nmi (31 km)	21508
Derna Lighthouse	Derna; 32.74801°N 22.68465°E	n/a	10 m (33 ft)	60 m (197 ft)	20 nmi (37 km)	21472
Farwah Lighthouse	Farwa Island; Nuqat al Khams; 33.10703°N 11.74345°E	n/a	12 m (39 ft)	17 m (56 ft)	12 nmi (22 km)	21728
Ra's al Hallab Lighthouse	Castelverde; 32.80193°N 13.80239°E	n/a	22 m (72 ft)	35 m (115 ft)	12 nmi (22 km)	21640
Ra's Lanuf Lighthouse	Ra's Lanuf; 30.5117°N 18.5383°E	n/a	52 m (171 ft)	50 m (164 ft)	15 nmi (28 km)	21612
Ra's Tajura Lighthouse	Tajura; 32.895°N 13.3867°E	n/a	17 m (56 ft)	34 m (112 ft)	14 nmi (26 km)	21644
Sidi Suwaykir Lighthouse	Deriana; 32.3333°N 20.2883°E	n/a	15 m (49 ft)	21 m (69 ft)	13 nmi (24 km)	21500
Sirte Lighthouse	Sirte; 31.2083°N 16.5933°E	n/a	30 m (98 ft)	35 m (115 ft)	15 nmi (28 km)	21624
Tobruk Lighthouse	Tobruk; 32.0883°N 23.99°E	n/a	8 m (26 ft)	53 m (174 ft)	15 nmi (28 km)	21452
Tolmeita Lighthouse	Tolmeita; 32.715°N 20.945°E	n/a	16 m (52 ft)	21 m (69 ft)	12 nmi (22 km)	21496
Tripoli Lighthouse	Tripoli; 32.905°N 13.1783°E	n/a	26 m (85 ft)	60 m (197 ft)	12 nmi (22 km)	21652
Zuwarah Lighthouse	Zuwarah; 32.925°N 12.12°E	n/a	13 m (43 ft)	15 m (49 ft)	12 nmi (22 km)	21716

== Historic lighthouses ==
- Leptis Magna Lighthouse – Located in the ruins of the Roman city of Leptis Magna, it was a lighthouse that was in use between 200 and 455 AD. It has been estimated that the multi-level tower once stood 35m high. A substantial part of the lower storey still remains at the site, on a headland overlooking the now silted-up harbour.

== See also ==
- List of lighthouses in Tunisia (to the west)
- List of lighthouses in Egypt (to the east)
- Lists of lighthouses and lightvessels
