= Ra's Bir Lighthouse =

- Location: Ra's Bir; Obock Region; Djibouti
- Coordinates: 11°58′49″N 43°21′42″E

Tower
- Constructed: 1952
- Height: 50 metres (160 ft)
- Markings: white tower and lantern

Light
- First lit: 1889/1952
- Focal height: 74 metres (243 ft)
- Range: 20 nautical miles (37 km; 23 mi)
- Characteristic: Fl(2) W 10s

Ra's Bir Lighthouse is an active lighthouse on the coast of Djibouti it marks the southern end of the strait of Bab-el-Mandeb connecting the Red Sea and Gulf of Aden. The current lighthouse is the second to be located on Ra's Bir, a remote headland on the northern side of the Gulf of Tadjoura.

== History ==
The first lighthouse at Ra's Bir, was completed in 1889 and consists of a two-storey square tower, it is now used as a radar station.

A new lighthouse, which was built adjacent to the original first entered service in 1952. It consists of a tall 50m high ribbed tower, which is white with an upper red band, that supports a single gallery and a white lantern. It sits within its own walled compound along with the keeper's accommodation and other outbuildings. With a focal height of 74m above sea level, the light can be seen for 20 nautical miles. Its light characteristic is made up of a pattern of two flashes of white light every ten seconds.

Sailing directions for the Red Sea and the Persian Gulf, note that the lighthouse and the surrounding coastline are plainly detectable on radar from over 20 miles away. It also highlights that hydrographic surveys of the local coastline are unfinished, and that a reef ranges up to a mile from the shore.

The current lighthouse is maintained by the Port authority of Djibouti. It is registered under the international Admiralty number D7272 and has the NGA identifier of 113–30952.

== See also ==
- List of lighthouses in Djibouti
