= List of lighthouses in Sudan =

This is a list of lighthouses in Sudan.

Name	Year built	Location & coordinates	Class of light	Focal height (metres)	NGA number	Admiralty number	Range (nml)
Abington Reef Lighthouse		Abington Reef	Fl(2) W 18s	30	112-30608	D7295.9	15
Damma Damma Lighthouse		Port Sudan	Q R	8	112-30632	D7295.6	6
Hindi Gider Lighthouse		Suakin, Hindi Gider	Fl(2) W 20s	27	112-30684	D7295.031	10
Masamirit Lighthouse		Masamirit, Suakin	Fl W 10s	26	112-30688	D7295.03	10
Port Sudan Entrance Lighthouse		Port Sudan	Fl(2) W 10s	19	112-30636	D7295.5	10
Port Sudan Harbor Range Front Lighthouse	2004	Port Sudan	F R (neon)	36	112-30648	D7295.65	
Port Sudan Harbor Range Rear Lighthouse	2004	Port Sudan	F R (neon)	53	112-30652	D7295.655	
Sanganeb Reef Light	1906	Sanganeb Reef	Fl W 5s	50	112-30612	D7295.8	19
Wingate Reef East Lighthouse		Wingate Reefs	Fl(3) W 15s	7	112-30620	D7295.79	6
Wingate Reef South Lighthouse		Wingate Reefs	Fl G 3s	8	112-30616	D7295.78	6

== See also ==
- List of lighthouses in Egypt (to the north)
- List of lighthouses in Eritrea (to the south-east)
- Lists of lighthouses and lightvessels
