= List of lighthouses in Somaliland =

This is a list of lighthouses in Somaliland.

== Lighthouses ==
Name	Image	Year built	Location & coordinates	Class of light	Focal height	NGA number	Admiralty number	Range nml
Berbera Lighthouse		1887	Berbera; 10°25′13.8″N 44°58′29.6″E	Oc W 4s.	22 meters (72 ft)	31040	D7264	7
Berbera Range Front Lighthouse		n/a	Berbera; 10°26′38.9″N 45°00′21.6″E	Q R	13 metres (43 ft)	31048	D7266	2
Berbera Range Rear Lighthouse		n/a	Berbera; 10°26′38.9″N 45°00′21.6″E	Iso R 4s.	17 metres (56 ft)	31052	D7266.1	2
Tamara Point Lighthouse		n/a	Berbera; 10°26′38.2″N 44°58′52.5″E	Fl W 5s.	23 metres (75 ft)	31040	D7264	8

== See also ==
- List of lighthouses in Somalia
- Lists of lighthouses and lightvessels
