= Mogadishu Lighthouse =

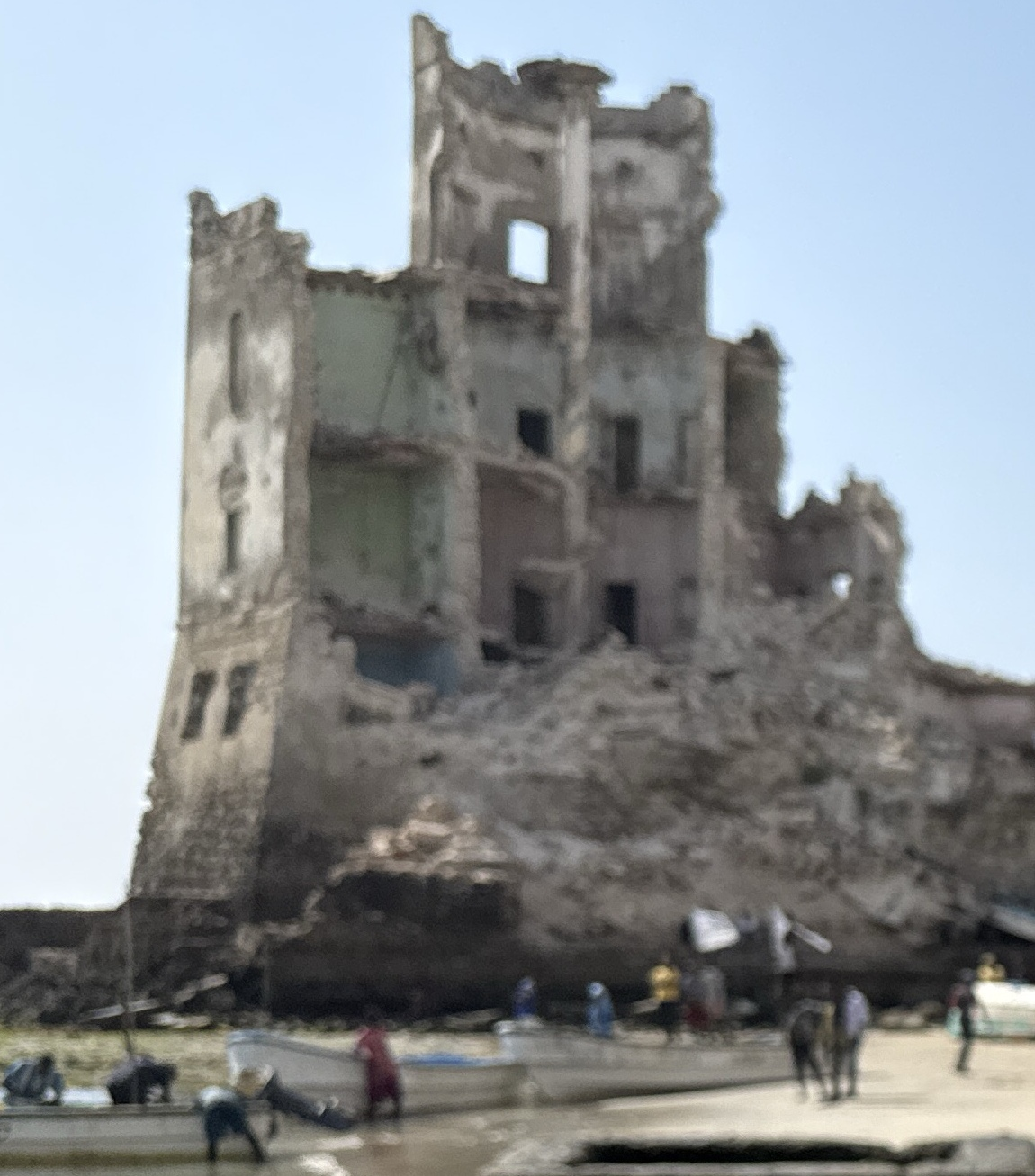
- The ruins of the lighthouse in 2024
- Location: Old harbour, Mogadishu, Somalia
- Coordinates: 2°01′56.3″N 45°20′43.1″E

Tower
- Constructed: 1903
- Construction: Stone tower
- Shape: Conical tower on an octagonal base
- Heritage: Partially collapsed ruin; undergoing structural assessment for potential restoration

Light
- First lit: c. 1938–1941
- Deactivated: Early 1990s
- Focal height: 74 m (243 ft)

The Mogadishu Lighthouse, also known as the Al-Munaara, is an inactive lighthouse located in the old harbour of Mogadishu, the capital city of Somalia. Built during the Italian colonial period, the lighthouse has long been a historical landmark of the city. After being severely damaged during the Somali Civil War, a significant portion of the structure collapsed in May 2023, prompting emergency conservation efforts. The lighthouse is now the focus of a UNESCO-led project aimed at its future restoration as a central part of a broader revival of the city's historic district.

== History ==
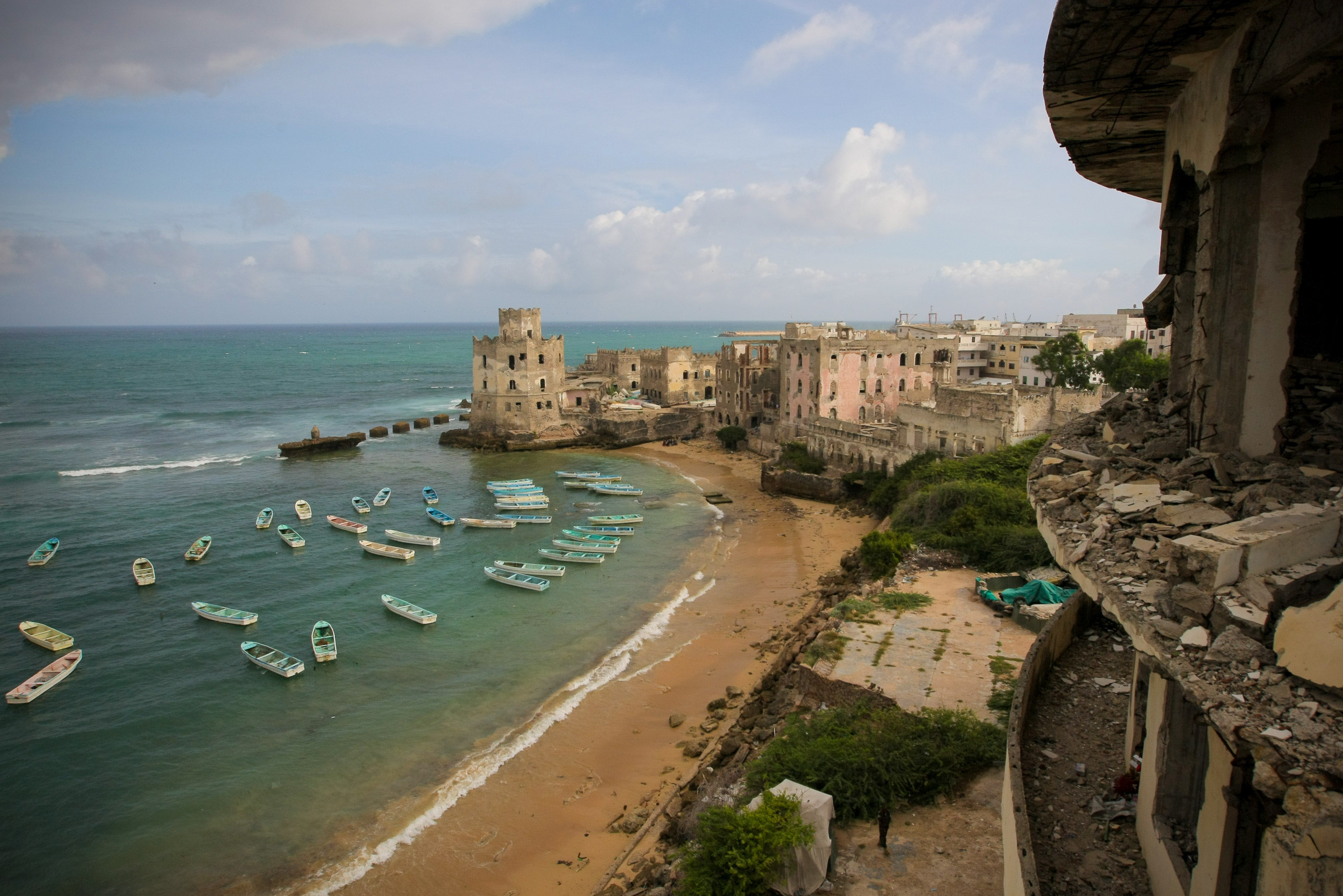
The abandoned lighthouse, prior to collapse (2012)

=== Construction and Operation ===
The lighthouse was built as the Faro del Lido Secondo in an "Arabic style" by the Italian colonial government in 1938, on the former site of a small harbor crane. Its construction was part of a new plan for the city, published in 1937. It served as a crucial navigational aid for ships entering the main port of Mogadishu, which was a key commercial hub in the Horn of Africa. It was dedicated to the Duke of the Abruzzi. The structure consisted of a tall stone tower with a lantern room and gallery at the top.

The lighthouse ceased operations in the early 1990s following the collapse of the central government and the outbreak of the Somali Civil War. During the intense fighting that engulfed the city, particularly the battles for control of the port, the lighthouse was heavily shelled and fell into disrepair. The lantern and the top section of the tower were destroyed, leaving only the main stone structure standing for decades.

=== Partial Collapse ===
After years of neglect and exposure to the elements, a large portion of the lighthouse's seaward-facing wall collapsed into the Indian Ocean on May 10, 2023. Four displaced people living in the building died in the collapse. The collapse was attributed to the structural weaknesses caused by decades of war damage and erosion from the sea. The event was widely seen as a tragic loss for the city's cultural heritage.

== Architecture ==
The Mogadishu Lighthouse was constructed as a white, conical stone tower, rising from an octagonal base. Its architectural style is often described as a blend of traditional Somali and Italian influences, characteristic of the colonial-era buildings in the city. Despite the severe damage and partial collapse, its distinctive shape remains a prominent feature on the Mogadishu coastline.

== Significance and Conservation ==
The ruined lighthouse is a symbol of Mogadishu's pre-war prosperity and a reminder of the destruction caused by the civil war. It is a frequently photographed landmark in the city, representing both a sense of loss and a hope for revival.

Following the 2023 collapse, the ALIPH Foundation, in partnership with the Heritage Institute for Policy Studies and local authorities, launched an emergency consolidation project. The project aimed to stabilize the ruin, prevent further collapse, and conduct initial documentation to inform future efforts.

In a further step towards its potential restoration, the lighthouse became the centerpiece of a major heritage revival project launched by UNESCO in 2024. As part of the "Reviving Mogadishu’s Culture" initiative, funded by the United Arab Emirates, the project involves comprehensive 3D laser scanning, detailed structural assessments, and the training of local Somali professionals in advanced conservation techniques. The primary objective is to develop a full conservation plan that will guide the future restoration of the lighthouse and serve as a model for preserving other historic sites in the city.

== See also ==
- History of Mogadishu
- Italian Somaliland
- List of lighthouses in Somalia
