= List of lighthouses in Tunisia =

This is a list of lighthouses in Tunisia, which are located along the Mediterranean coastline, and on a number of Tunisian islands. The list includes those marine lighthouses that are named landfall lights, or have a range of at least fifteen nautical miles.

== Lighthouses ==
Name	Image	Location & coordinates	Year built	Tower height	Focal height	Range nml	NGA number
Cap Bon Lighthouse		Cap Bon; 37.0783°N 11.045°E	1875	20 m (66 ft)	126 m (413 ft)	30 nmi (56 km)	21984
Cap Serrat Lighthouse		Cap Serrat, Bizerte; 37.2317°N 9.21°E	1890	13 m (43 ft)	199 m (653 ft)	24 nmi (44 km)	22136
Gabès		Gabès; 33.8933°N 10.1133°E	1893	11 m (36 ft)	13 m (43 ft)	20 nmi (37 km)	21820
Galiton de l'Ouest		Galite Islands; 37.4983°N 8.8767°E	1920	14 m (46 ft)	168 m (551 ft)	24 nmi (44 km)	22144
Hammamet Lighthouse		Hammamet; 36.395°N 10.615°E	1912	14 m (46 ft)	17 m (56 ft)	15 nmi (28 km)	21976
Ile Kuriat Lighthouse		Kuriat, Monastir; 35.7983°N 11.0333°E	1894	26 m (85 ft)	30 m (98 ft)	18 nmi (33 km)	21920
Ile Plane Lighthouse		Plane Island, Ghar al Milh; 37.1817°N 10.3283°E	1888	12 m (39 ft)	20 m (66 ft)	15 nmi (28 km)	22056
Iles Cani Lighthouse		Gran Ile Cani, Cap Zebib; 37.3567°N 10.1233°E	1860	21 m (69 ft)	39 m (128 ft)	19 nmi (35 km)	22064
Kelibia Lighthouse		Kelibia; 36.8367°N 11.1167°E	1888	18 m (59 ft)	82 m (269 ft)	23 nmi (43 km)	21980
Mahdia Lighthouse		Mahdia; 35.5083°N 11.0817°E	1890	15 m (49 ft)	26 m (85 ft)	17 nmi (31 km)	21904
Ras Enghela Lighthouse		Cape Angela; 37.345°N 9.7383°E	1890	15 m (49 ft)	38 m (125 ft)	28 nmi (52 km)	22132
Ras Kaboudia Lighthouse		Chebba; 35.2333°N 11.1567°E	Unknown	18 m (59 ft)	28 m (92 ft)	19 nmi (35 km)	21900
Ras Taguerness Lighthouse		Djerba; 33.8217°N 11.045°E	1895	49 m (161 ft)	64 m (210 ft)	24 nmi (44 km)	21764
Ras Thyna Lighthouse		Thyna; 34.65°N 10.685°E	1895	44 m (144 ft)	55 m (180 ft)	24 nmi (44 km)	21836
Sidi Bou Said Lighthouse		Sidi Bou Said; 36.8717°N 10.3483°E	1840	12 m (39 ft)	146 m (479 ft)	22 nmi (41 km)	22040
Sousse Lighthouse		Sousse; 35.8233°N 10.6383°E	1890	22 m (72 ft)	70 m (230 ft)	22 nmi (41 km)	21956
Tabarka Lighthouse		Tabarka; 36.9633°N 8.7583°E	1906	14 m (46 ft)	72 m (236 ft)	17 nmi (31 km)	22148

== See also ==
- List of lighthouses in Algeria (to the west)
- List of lighthouses in Libya (to the east)
- Lists of lighthouses and lightvessels
