= Benghazi Lighthouse =

Coordinates: 32°07′30″N 20°03′49″E

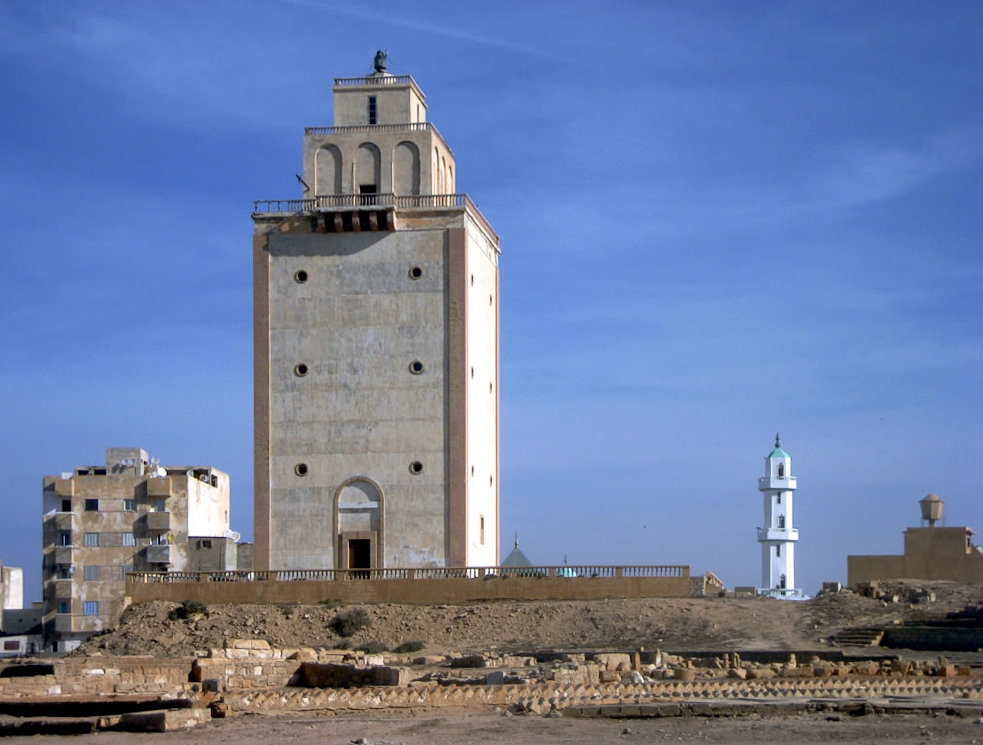
Benghazi lighthouse

The Benghazi Lighthouse is an active lighthouse located on the coast of Libya in the neighborhood of the Sidi Khrebish area in Benghazi. Its NGA number is 21508.

== History ==
Built in 1922 during the Italian colonization of Libya and inaugurated in 1928, it is one of Benghazi's oldest and most prominent historical landmarks. As well as guiding ships, it was also used as a water tower.

The lighthouse is 22 m (72 ft) high and has a focal height of 41 m (135 ft). The light has a range of 17 nautical miles.

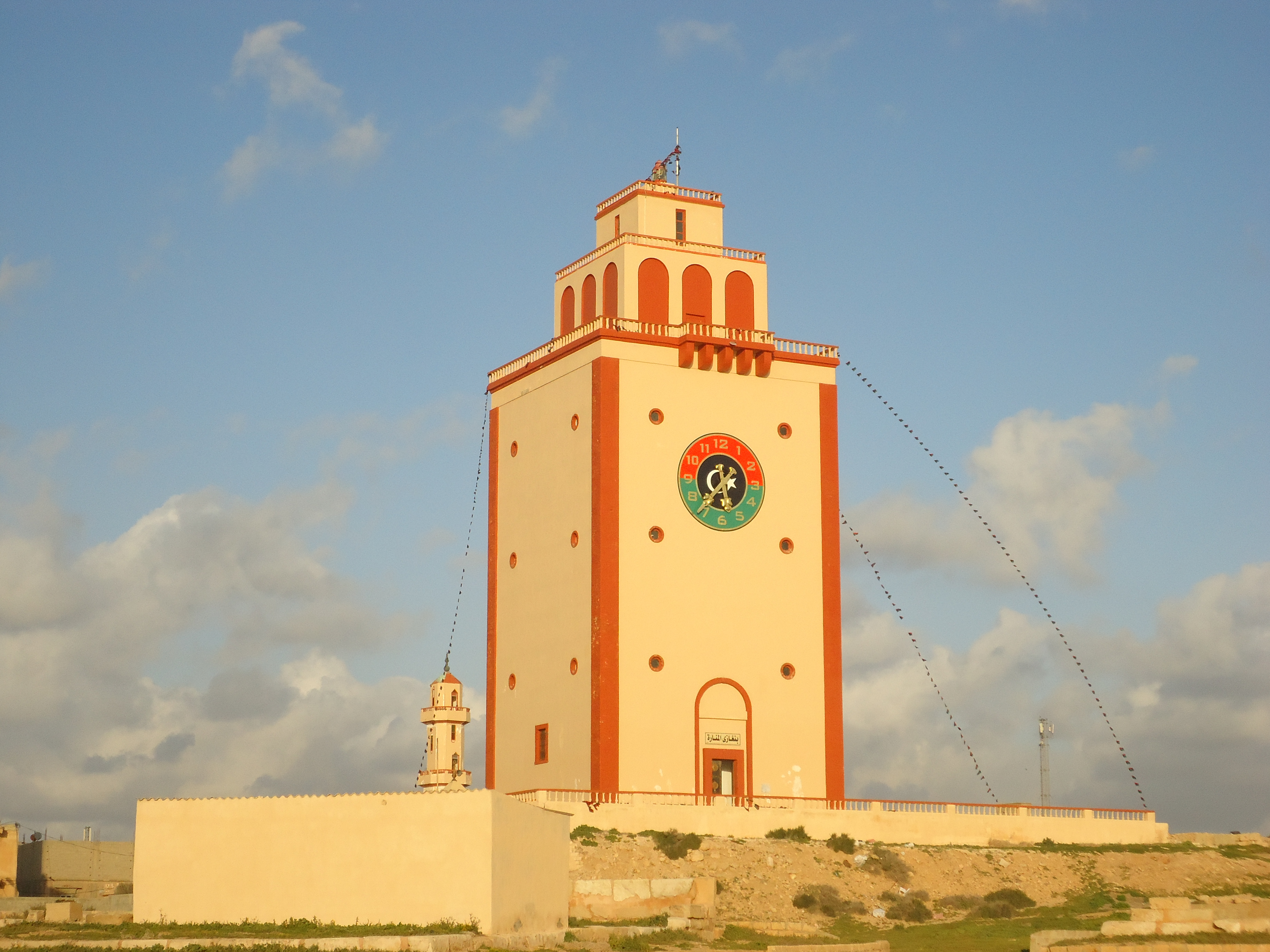
Benghazi lighthouse

The lighthouse sustained some damage during World War II, but was much more severely damaged in the recent Libyan civil war. Some of the Islamist opponents of the military commander Khalifa Hafter took shelter in the lighthouse, and later used it to bury about 200 of their dead. Airstrikes hit the upper chamber and took out the lantern which fell but was not destroyed.

In 2014, a 5-meter diameter clock in the colors of the national flag was inserted into the sea-facing side of the lighthouse, a donation from businessman Abubakr Sheikh, in spite of opposition from the architectural community.

== Renovation ==
A renovation project announced in 2019 aimed restoration of the lighthouse to its original state, and was projected to take 13 to 17 months. The project was initiated and funded by Benghazi's local authority, which is part of Libya's eastern interim government, headed by Abdullah al-Thinni.

== See also ==
- List of lighthouses in Libya
