= Farwa Island =

Libyan island in the Mediterranean Sea

Farwa Island is an uninhabited a 13-kilometer-long sandbar in Libyan territory near Tunisia.

In 2024, North African rhim gazelles (Gazella leptoceros), an endangered species, were relocated to the island.

Farwa Island contains a lighthouse at 33.10703°N 11.74345°E.
