= Brothers Islands Lighthouse =

Brothers Islands Lighthouse Al Ikhwān
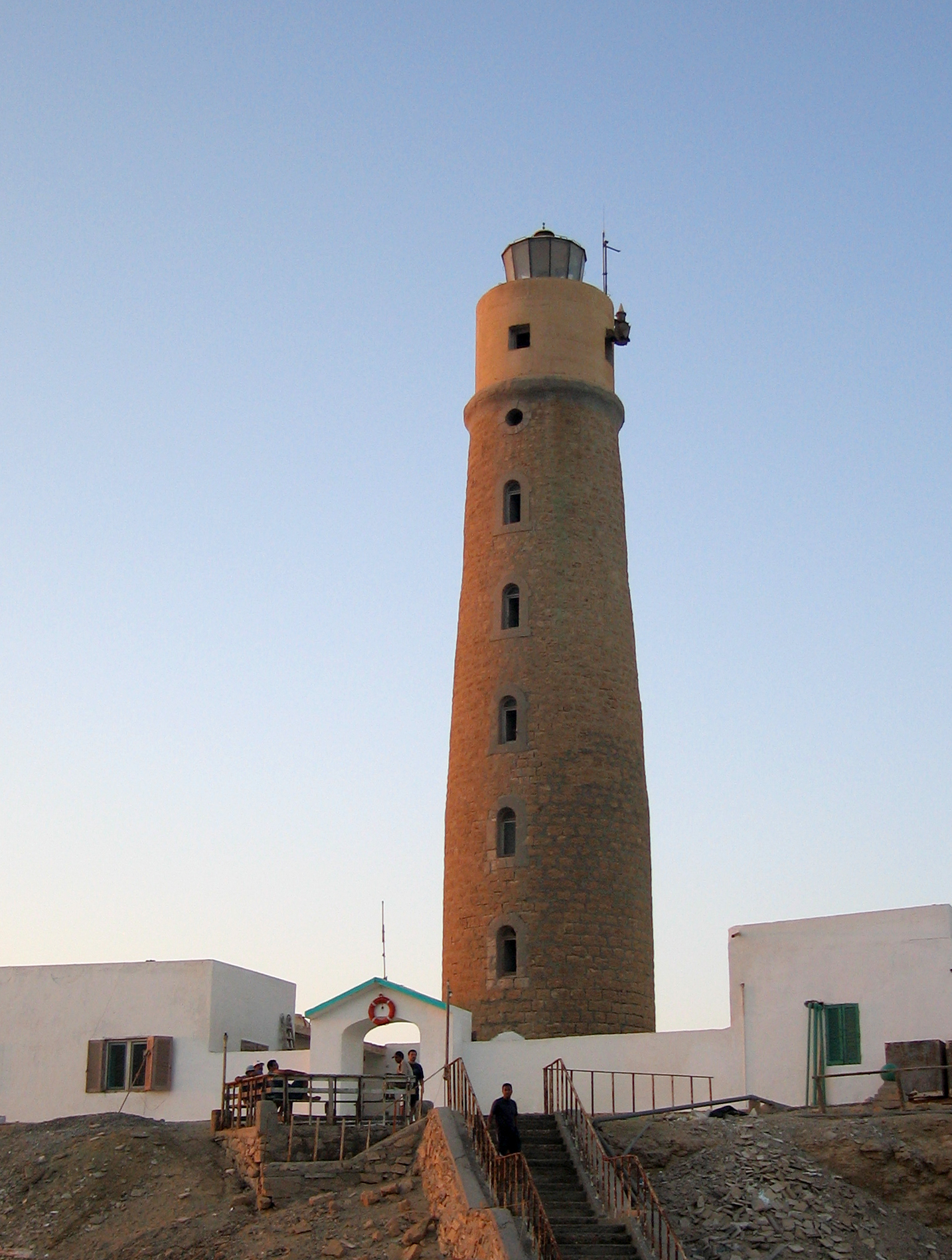
- Lighthouse in 2006
- Location: Brothers Islands, Red Sea
- Coordinates: 26.314542°N 34.843497°E

Tower
- Constructed: 1883
- Construction: stone tower
- Height: 31 metres (102 ft)
- Shape: cylindrical tower with balcony and lantern
- Markings: unpainted tower, white lantern
- Operator: Egyptian Navy

Light
- Focal height: 36 metres (118 ft)
- Lens: Chance Brothers Fresnel lens
- Range: 20 nautical miles (37 km; 23 mi)
- Characteristic: Fl W 5s.

Brothers Islands Lighthouse is an active 19th century lighthouse located on The Brothers, Egypt, an island in the Red Sea, 65 km east of al-Qusayr. Built by the British in 1883 and renovated in 1993, the lighthouse is operated by the Egyptian Navy. The site is usually open to visitors who are normally permitted to climb the 31-metre-high (102 ft) tower.

The lighthouse still retains its original hand-cranked Chance Brothers Fresnel lens and drive mechanism, which requires winding every four hours by the attendant lighthouse keepers.
