= Ubek =

Ubek may refer to:

- Ubek (Soviet Union) (1918–1935), hydrometeorological service units
- Ubek, an employee of the Ministry of Public Security (Poland)
- Ubek (video game), a 1995 video game
