= Lesnoy Mole Rear Range Light =

Lighthouse in Saint Petersburg, Russia

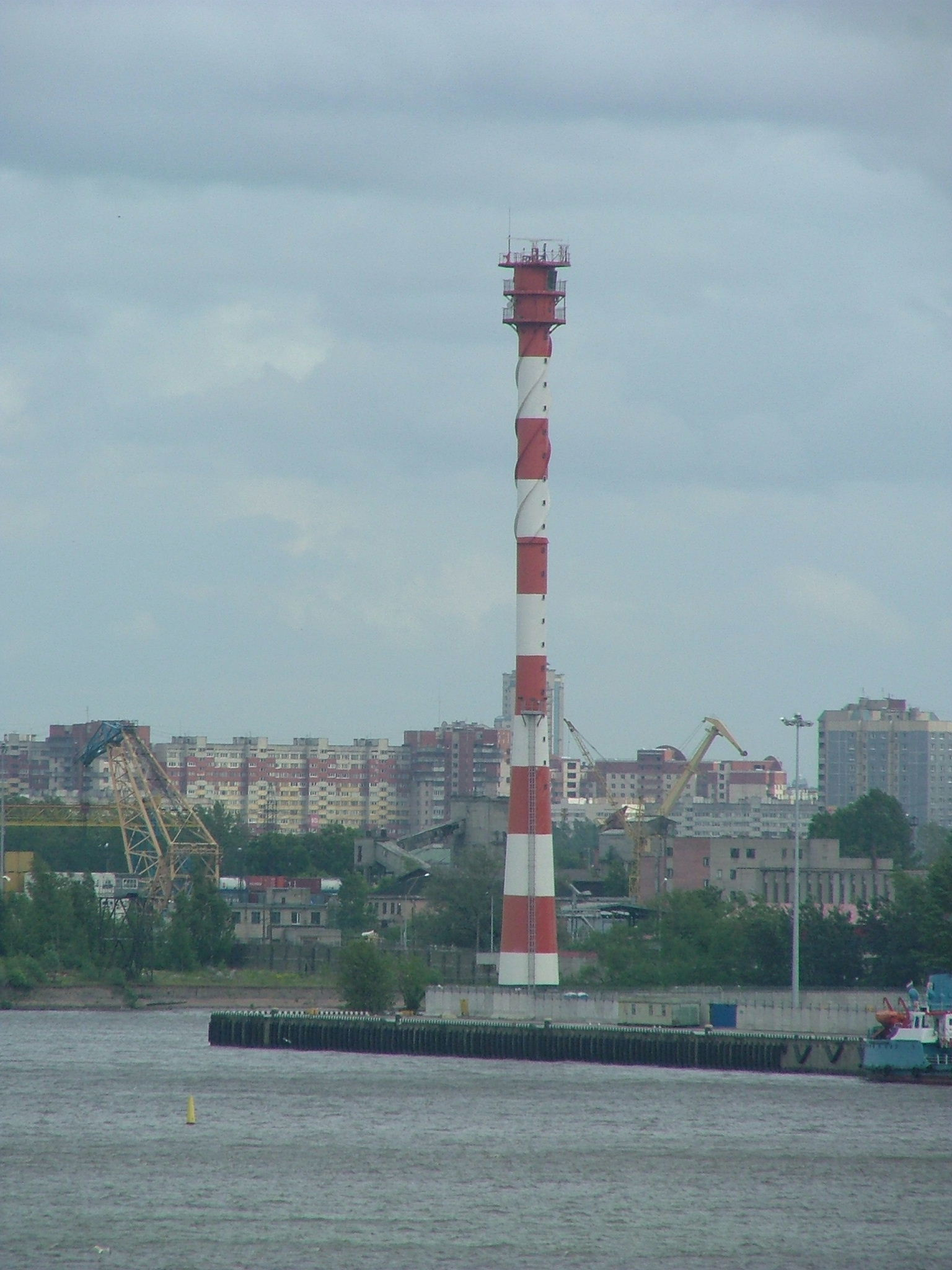
- Lesnoy Mole Rear Range Light in 2009
- Location: Saint Petersburg; Russia
- Coordinates: 59°52′40.2″N 30°12′58.96″E

Tower
- Construction: concrete tower
- Height: 239 feet (73 m)
- Shape: tapered cylindrical tower with several galleries and lantern
- Markings: red and white horizontal bands tower

Light
- Focal height: 249 feet (76 m)
- Range: 10 nautical miles (19 km)
- Characteristic: Oc R 4s.

Lesnoy Mole Rear Range Light is an active lighthouse and range light in Saint Petersburg, Russia. It is located in a dockyard area on the waterfront and guides ships into the commercial harbor of Saint Petersburg.

At a height of 239 feet (73 m) it is the fourth tallest "traditional lighthouse" in the world, the tallest in Russia, and the tallest range light in the world.

== See also ==
- List of lighthouses in Russia
- List of tallest lighthouses in the world
