= Russian Hydrographic Service =

- Гидрографическая служба России
- Flag of hydrographic vessels of the Russian Navy (since 2001)

Agency overview
- Formed: November 1777
- Jurisdiction: Russian Federation
- Headquarters: St. Petersburg
- Agency executive: Capt. Sergey V. Travin, Head of Navigation and Oceanography of the Ministry of Defence
- Parent agency: Ministry of Defence: Russian Navy
- Child agency: Russian Lighthouse Administration

The Russian Hydrographic Service (Russian: Гидрографическая служба России, Gidrograficheskaya sluzhba Rossii), officially the Department of Navigation and Oceanography of the Ministry of Defence of the Russian Federation, (Note: Russian: Управление навигации и океанографии Министерства обороны Российской Федерации, romanized: Upravleniye navigatsii i okeanografii Ministerstva oborony Rossiyskoy Federatsii) is the hydrographic office of Russia responsible to for operating lighthouses, facilitating navigation, performing hydrographic surveys and publishing nautical charts. It is formally a department of the Ministry of Defence and a unit of the Russian Navy. Its headquarters are located in Saint Petersburg.

The Hydrographic Service was established in 1777 during the expansion of the Imperial Russian Navy but can trace its origins to the time of Tsar Peter the Great in the late 17th century. It has been historically attached to the Russian Navy, and the agents and supervisors of hydrographic works have been largely naval officers throughout its history. Its surveying has been indispensable due to vast size of Russia and its nature that it includes many different seas, long and indented coastlines and a great number of islands, as well as a complex system of waterways and lakes.

The Russia Hydrographic Service is a member of the International Hydrographic Organization.

== Competences and functions ==
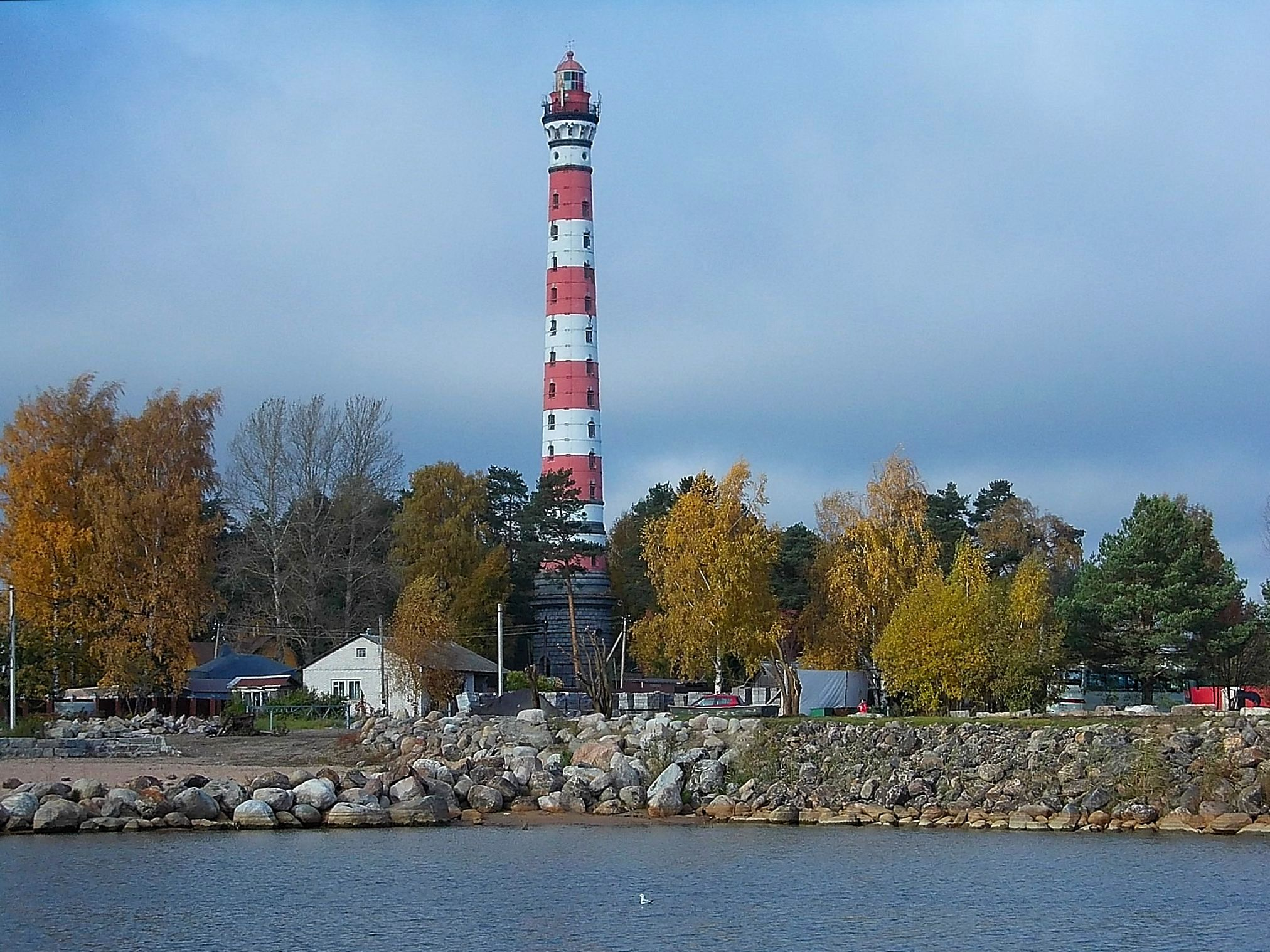
The Osinovetsky Lighthouse near the Neva entrance is one of the tallest lighthouses in the world.

Despite having undergone a number of name changes along its history, the main functions of the Hydrographic Service of the Russian Navy have been quite consistently the following:

- Providing specific services to the Navy, including other branches of the Russian Armed Forces, related to the Russian maritime and coastal areas, as well as navigable inland waters. These services are of a strategic order and encompass the following fields:
  - Navigation and hydrography.
  - Hydrometeorology
  - Surveys
- Navigation and hydrographic support of maritime activities within Russian waters and implementation of the international Safety of Life at Sea Convention regulations in the waters under Russian jurisdiction.

== History ==
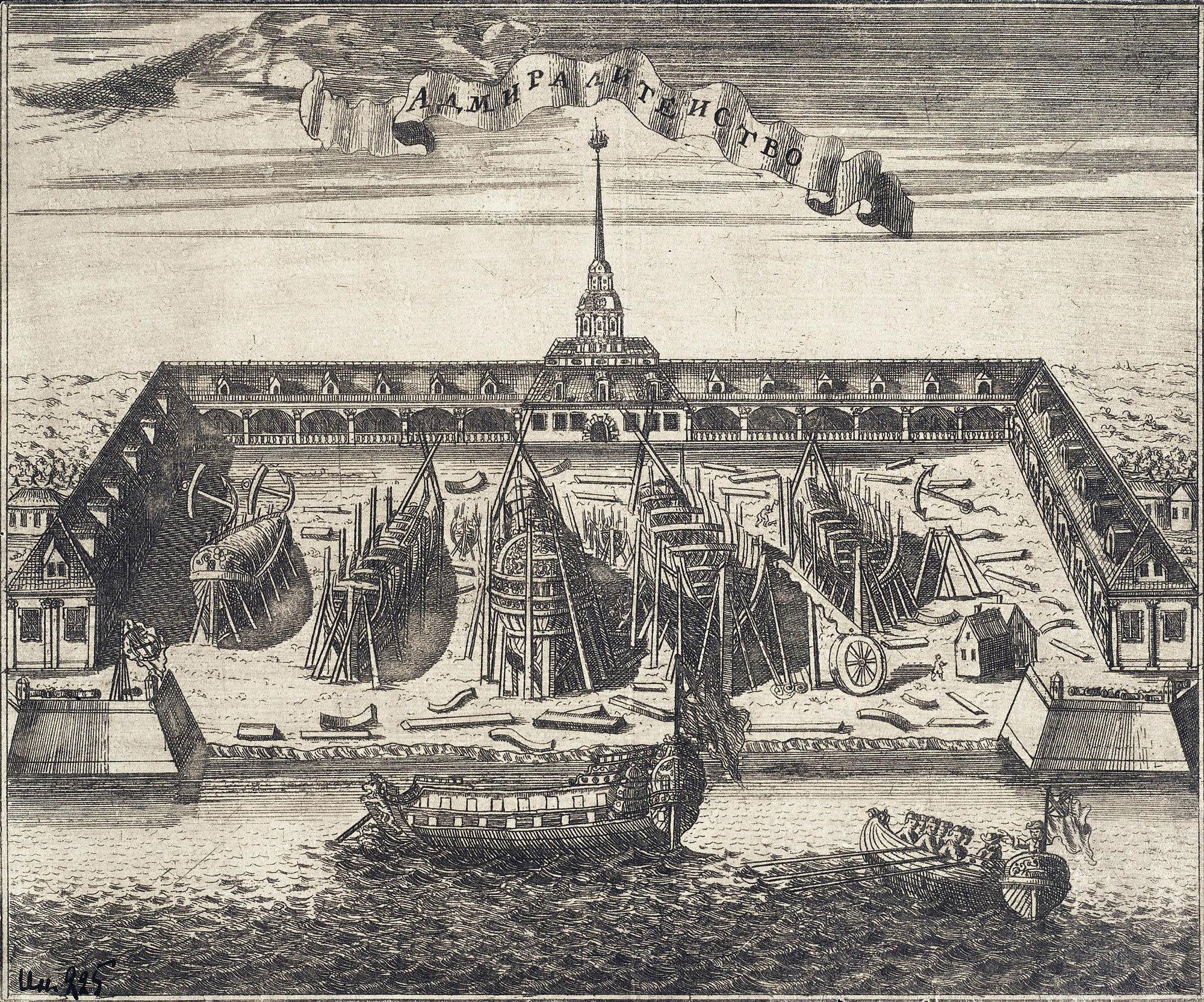
Russian Admiralty (1716)

=== Background ===
At the time of Peter I hydrographic surveys were carried out following personal decrees of the emperor through the General admiral. Hydrographic tasks were always performed by Naval officers, who from 1724 onward began to work under instructions from the Admiralty Board.

By 1746 important matters concerning hydrography were entrusted to Fleet Captain Alexey Nagayev who compiled the first atlas of the Bering Sea, as well as of the Baltic Sea in 1752. Nagayev's charts were very detailed for its time and, despite a few shortcomings, his atlas of the Baltic Sea was republished in 1757, 1788, 1789 and 1795, serving Russian mariners for more than 50 years.

=== Foundation and first phase (1777–1885) ===
Flag of the Hydrographer General (1828)

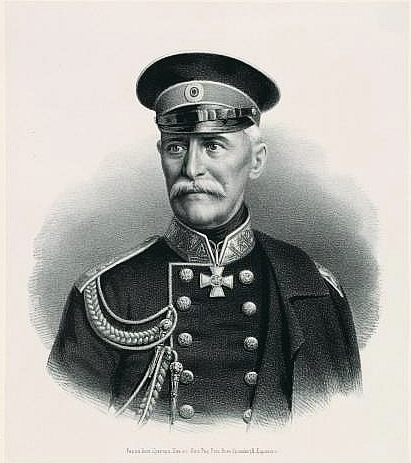
Alexander Menshikov

In 1777 the Admiralty Board founded the Russian Hydrographic Service, implementing a plan that marked the beginning of systematic drawing of nautical charts. In 1799 a committee for the dissemination of marine sciences and the improvement of the drawing of charts was created, and in 1807 the Russian Lighthouse Administration was established so that the lighthouse system in Russian shores, shoals and islands would follow an organized pattern and be provided with regular, state-controlled maintenance. The first director of this section was Leontiy Spafaryev.

In 1827 the special Office of the Hydrographer General was established. In the same year the Corps of Naval Navigators was founded, the chief of which was also a hydrographer. The first and only general of the newly instituted body was hydrographer Admiral Gavril Andreevich Sarychev (in office 1827–31), after whose death the management of the office was transferred to the Chief of Naval Staff Prince A. S. Menshikov. The first and only director of the hydrographic depot was F. F. Schubert (in office 1827–37).

In 1837 the former institutions dealing with hydrography were abolished and all the management of the hydrographic section was transferred to the newly instituted Russian Hydrographic Department, the directors of which were:

- A. G. Villamov (1837–54)
- Baron F. v. Wrangel (1854–55)
- M. v. Reinecke (1855–59)
- S. I. Zelenoy (1859–74)
- G. A. Vevel von Krieger (1874–81)
- T. F. Veselago (1881)
- P. N. Nazimov (1892–1898).

==== Publications ====
The Hydrographic Office engaged in the periodical publication of notes, devoted both to hydrographic information, as well as information on other sectors of naval affairs. The committee, established in 1799, published:

- In 1801 – "Notice to Mariners" (1 vol.)
- From 1807 to 1827 – "Notes of the State Admiralty Department" (13 pieces)
- From 1835 to 1837 – "Notes of the Hydrographic Depot" (5 parts)
- From 1842 to 1852 – "Notes of the Hydrographic Department."
- 1854–83 – Annual reports of the Director of the Hydrographic Department.

=== The Main Hydrographic Office (1885–1917) ===
Flag of the Main Hydrographic Office (1885)

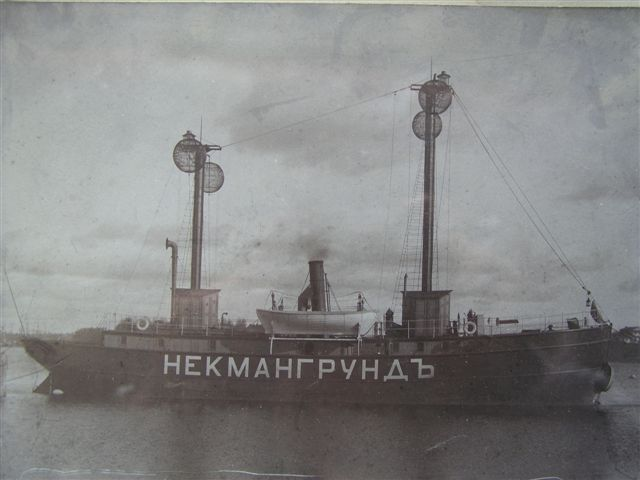
Lightship Nekmangrund (1898) off Hiiumaa

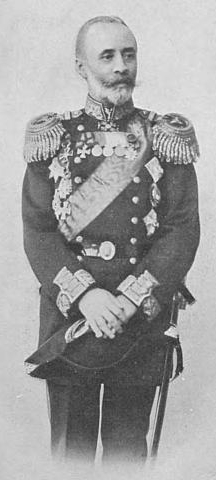
Yakov Gilterbrandt (1842–1915)

In 1885 the Russian Hydrographic Department was overhauled and renamed as 'Main Hydrographic Office' —Главное гидрографическое управление (ГГУ)— of the Admiralty. Its chief was the former director in charge of the lighthouses and navigation of the Baltic Sea, Vice Admiral R. Bazhenov, who was also the chairman of the Maritime Scientific Committee —Морского учёного комитета.

1886 saw the establishment of the meteorological department. In 1891 the fields of drawing, engraving, lithography and printing were integrated into the maritime cartography section and from 1897 this section began successful experiments printing nautical charts using aluminum printing plates. In 1902 a new building with a photographic department, including a workshop introducing innovative photographic reproduction techniques, was built within the premises of the Main Hydrographic Office. By 1904 the new techniques had been mastered by the staff and high-quality material began to be printed.

The duties of the Hydrographic Department at the time included:

- Planning and carrying out surveys.
- Preparation of maps, atlases, sailing directions and other guidance materials for safe navigation, as well as making periodical corrections —when needed.
- Erection and proper maintenance of lighthouses, electric beacons, rescue stations, towers, day beacons, buoys, signals, and other warning devices to improve navigation safety.
- Supply of military tools such as maps, pilot manuals, signals manuals and other guides.
- Inspection and evaluation of ships' logbooks in order to gather relevant navigational, astronomical, magnetic, and other observations.

The jurisdiction of the Main Hydrographic Office included the management of:

- Pilotage instructions and navigational instruments workshops in St. Petersburg and Nikolaev
- The Russian Maritime Observatory in Kronstadt and Nikolaev.
- The weather stations on the shores of the Russian seas.
- The maritime semaphore telegraph in Kronstadt.
- The signal stations in Nikolaev, Bogdanovka, Parutino, Adzhigol and Ochakov.

The period between 1885 and 1917 was characterized by full-scale construction and modernization of lighthouse equipment, compass technology and improvements in the printing of nautical charts. The 1910–1915 Arctic Ocean Hydrographic Expedition, led by Rear Admiral Boris A. Vilkitsky on icebreakers Vaygach and Taymyr mapped the last blank areas of the northern coast of Eastern Siberia —which were the last unmapped coastal areas of Eurasia, and gathered as well a vast amount of oceanographic and meteorological data.

The heads of the Main Hydrographic Office were:

- Konstantin Mikhailov (1898–1903)
- Yakov Gilterbrandt (1903–1907)
- Andrey Vilkitsky (1907–1913)
- M. Y. Zhdanko (1913–1917)

=== The Soviet period (1917–1992) ===
Flag of the commanding officer on hydrographic and pilot vessels (1924–1935)

Flag on hydrographic vessels not commanded by naval officers (1924–1935)

Pennant flown on Ubek vessels (1924–1935)

Pennant of the Commander of a hydrographic unit (1935–)

Stern flag on hydrographic, pilot vessels and lightships (1935–)

Flag on hydrographic and lightships (1950–1964); and hydrographic ships (1964–1992)

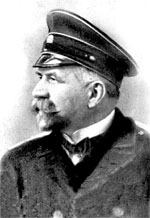
Alexander Varnek (1858–1930)

After the initial period of instability that followed the 1917 Russian Revolution against the Imperial Government, the Hydrographic Office slowly returned to its duties as the situation calmed down and the Soviet takeover was completed. The work and dedication of hydrographers such as Konstantin Neupokoev, ensured that the service returned to normality. Czarist names and symbols were quickly removed, the former hydrographic institution being renamed as the 'Main Hydrographic Office of the Russian Republic' —Главное гидрографическое управление Российской Республики.

Between 1918 and 1922 hydrometeorological service units named Ubek (Убек) were established for the management of navigation safety measures. The Ubek regulated the particular hydrographic zone —in Arkhangelsk for example it was 'Ubek-North'— as part of the unified local authority directly responsible to the central Soviet government.

In 1924 the Hydrographic Office was renamed the 'Central Hydrographic Department of the USSR' and a set of new flags and pennants was issued. Barely two years later, in September 1926, the office underwent another name change; the new name was "Hydrographic Department of the Office of Naval Forces of the Workers' and Peasants' Red Army" (UVMS Hydrographic Department of the Red Army) —Гидрографический отдел Управления Военно-морских сил Рабоче-крестьянской Красной Армии. In 1927 the name was simplified to 'Hydrographic Office UVMS Red Army' —Гидрографическое управление УВМС РККА.

Emperor Nicholas II Land first partially charted by Boris Vilkitsky in 1913, but still not fully surveyed when it was renamed Severnaya Zemlya by the Presidium of the Central Executive Committee of the USSR in 1926, was the last blank area on the vast map of the Soviet Union. Vilkitsky's expedition, which in 1913 sighted and surveyed a section of the eastern coastline of what he assumed was a single landmass, had to concentrate on the Siberian continental shore in order to prepare the way for the Northeast Passage and he had no means to make a comprehensive survey further north. Finally a hydrographic expedition of the Arctic Institute of the USSR led by Georgy Ushakov and Nikolay Urvantsev thoroughly surveyed the large Severnaya Zemlya archipelago in 1930–32, making it the last sizable territory on Earth to be put on the map.

In 1935 the Ubek were replaced by hydrographic offices subordinate to the commander of the fleets and flotillas. In 1937 the 'Hydrographic Office UVMS Red Army' was renamed the "Hydrographic Office of the Workers' and Peasants' Navy" —Гидрографическое управление Рабоче-крестьянского Военно-морского флота (РК ВМФ). The design of the flags and pennants used by the office also underwent changes.

In 1940 the Hydrographic Office was renamed 'Hydrographic Office of the Navy' —Гидрографическое управление ВМФ. The following year, owing to the dire situation of the Great Patriotic War (1941–1945), a Task Force in the Hydrographic Department of the Navy was formed in Moscow by the Chief of the General Staff in order to deal more effectively with the emergency matters caused by the war in Russian soil and waters.

In postwar times, after the initial period of reconstruction was over, the Soviet Navy began the challenging task of creating an oceanic fleet carrying nuclear weapons. The 1960–1970 decade saw the introduction and development of ballistic missile submarines as part of the strategical aims of the Soviet fleet. These submarines were designed to be able to navigate in all areas of the oceans, including in the Arctic Ocean under the ice cover. In the field of navigation, during this period radar reflectors, radio beacons and other modernized signal systems were introduced.

The technological leap of that decade would impose a radical change in the navigational, hydrographic and hydrometeorological support of the Navy. During this period the need for innovative and detailed survey and mapping of the Earth's geophysics, including gravity and magnetic fields, became of the utmost importance for the Hydrographic Service of the Soviet Union. At that time, using its survey vessels, the department spearheaded a comprehensive study of large areas of the Atlantic, Pacific, Indian, Arctic, as well as of the then little explored Southern Ocean off the coast of Antarctica. As a result, a huge volume of data on bottom topography, physical fields, and hydrophysical characteristics of the water masses, among other pioneering oceanographic information of the oceans, were collected.

In 1972, owing to Cold War dictated priorities, the Hydrographic Office of the Navy was overhauled and transformed into the 'General Directorate of Navigation and Oceanography of the Ministry of Defense of the USSR' —Главное управление навигации и океанографии Министерства обороны СССР (ГУНиО МО). The 1970–1980 decade was marked by an increased international prominence of the 'General Directorate of Navigation and Oceanography of the Ministry of Defense'. Since then the Hydrographic Service of the USSR officially represented the interests of the Soviet Union —in the same manner that the organization that replaced it in later years would do for the Russian Federation— in the International Hydrographic Organization and the International Association of Lighthouse Authorities, as well as the interests of the Ministry of Defence in the Intergovernmental Oceanographic Commission of UNESCO.

The heads of the Hydrographic Service of the USSR were:

- Eugene Byalokoz (1917–1919)
- Pavel Messer (1920–1922)
- Sergei Blinov (1922–1925), 1st term
- Mikhail Viktorov (1925–1926)
- Sergei Blinov (1926–1928), 2nd term
- Izrail Razgon (1928–1932)
- Vasily Vasilyev (1932–1937)
- Nikolai Gorbunov (1937–1939)
- Iakov Lagushkin (1939–1947)
- Mikhail Kulikov (1947–1948)
- Vladimir Tributs (1949–1952)
- Pavel Abankin (1952–1958)
- Valentin Chekurov (1958–1963)
- Anatoliy Rassokho (1963–1985)
- Arkady Mikhailovsky (1985–1988)
- Yuri Zheglov (1988–1994)

=== The Russian Federation (from 1992 onward) ===
Flag of hydrographic ships and lightships (1992–2001)

In the wake of the dissolution of the Soviet Union, the 'General Directorate of Navigation and Oceanography of Defense of the USSR' would be placed under the Russian Federation, the legal successor of the USSR. In 1992 the service was renamed as the 'Main Directorate of Navigation and Oceanography of the Ministry of Defense of the Russian Federation' —Главное управление навигации и океанографии Министерства Обороны Российской Федерации (ГУНиО Минобороны России). Depending from their location, some of the vessels of the Soviet Hydrographic Service managed to be released and join the navies of the newly-formed republics after the breakup of the USSR. These ships were usually renamed and overhauled or transformed before being put into use, for example the GS-13 small hydrographic vessel that had been launched in 1986 in Soviet Lithuania became the Pereyaslav (U512) when it was made part of the Ukrainian Navy in November 1995.

Although the basic designs were left unchanged, prominent Communist-era symbols —such as the hammer and sickle and the red star, were removed from the flags of the Russian Hydrographic Service and the blue and white Russian Navy Ensign was restored. In 2001 a new regulation introduced slight alterations in the symbols that had been adopted in 1992 following the fall of the USSR.

In 2006 the name of the Russian Hydrographic Service would be changed to 'Department of Navigation and Oceanography of the Ministry of Defence of the Russian Federation' —Управление навигации и океанографии Министерства Обороны Российской Федерации (УНиО Минобороны России), its current official name. Russian military presence in Arctic waters resumed in the summer of 2013 when Hydrographic Service vessels belonging to the Northern Fleet sailed to Rudolf Island in Franz Josef Land. The area had been neglected by the armed forces for a long time in the years that followed the fall of the USSR.

The heads of the Hydrographic Service of the Russian Federation in recent times have been:

- Yuri Zheglov (1988–1994)
- Anatoly Komaritsyn (1994–2006)
- Sergey Kozlov (2006–2010)
- Alexander Shemetov (2010–2013)
- Sergey Travin (2013–)

== Vessels ==
The vessels operating for the Russian Hydrographic Service have been historically of two orders or categories. To the first category belong those vessels that were built specifically as survey ships, of which there are different classes, and to the second, other kind of vessels of the Russian Navy that, although not especially built for the purpose, have eventually engaged in survey operations. The latter usually undertook surveys for specific periods of time during their naval service, such as the a four-masted tall ship Kruzenshtern, which performed hydrographic surveys between 1961 and 1965.

=== Types of vessels ===
==== Hydrographic vessels ====
- 1896 Project, large hydrographic boats
- Baklan (19920 Project), large hydrographic boats
- Yaroslavets (G376 Project), middle-sized hydrographic boats
- Flamingo (T-1415 Project), middle-sized hydrographic boats
- 382 Project, small hydrographic boats
- 727 Project, small hydrographic boats
- Kaira (1403 Project), small hydrographic boats
- Drofa (16830 Project), small hydrographic boats

==== Oceanographic vessels ====
- Project 97B, Vladimir Kavrayskiy (only ship built; no longer in service)
- 852 Project, 6 vessels built, including Admiral Vladimirskiy
- 22010 Project

==== Survey vessels ====
- Ocean class, large survey vessels
- Kamchadal
- Nord class
- 860 Project
- 861 Project
- Arktika class (861 Project)
- 862 Project (Yug class), 9 ships built; includes hydrographic survey ship Senezh.
- 865 Project
- 870 Project, small survey vessels
- 871 Project, small survey vessels
- 872 Project, small survey vessels
- 16611 Project, small survey vessels
- Alex Maryshev class, small survey vessels
- V19910 Project, small survey vessels

==== Images of selected vessels ====
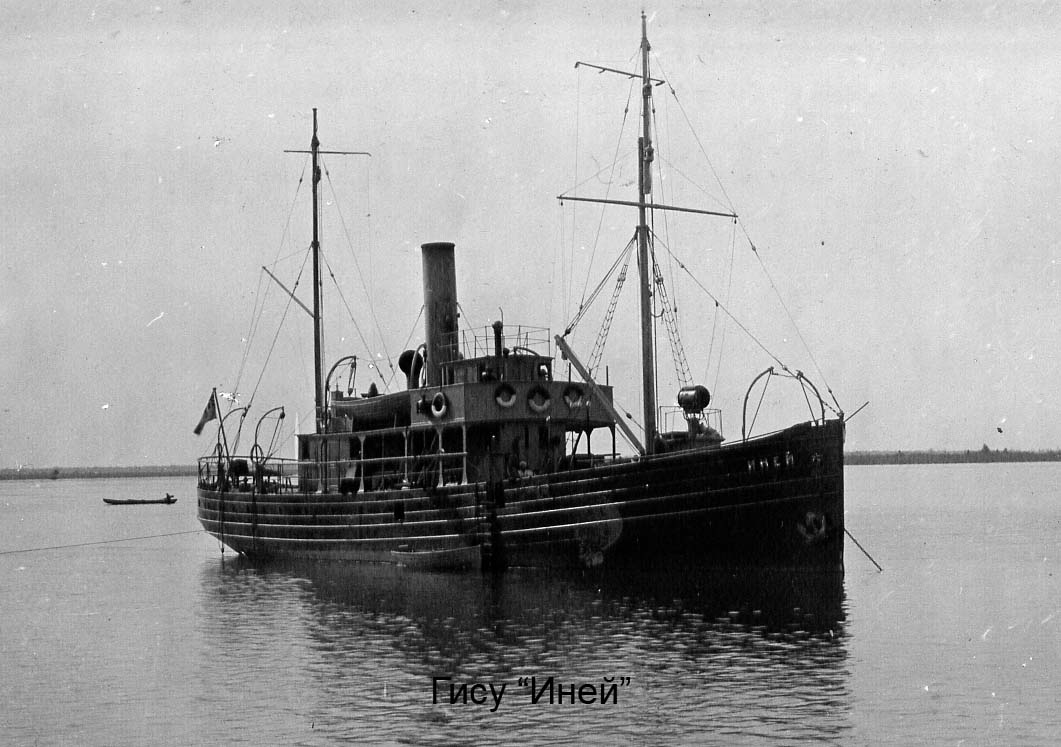
Hydrographic survey ship Iney (1909) in the Gulf of Ob

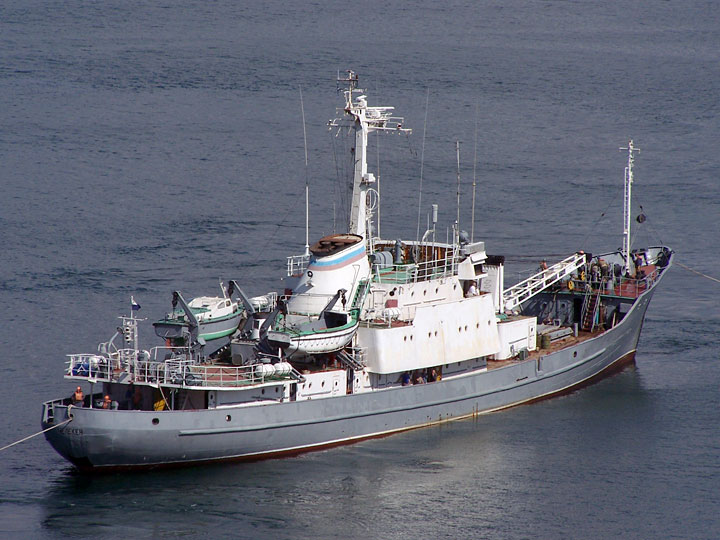
861 Project] hydrographic survey ship Cheleken (1970)

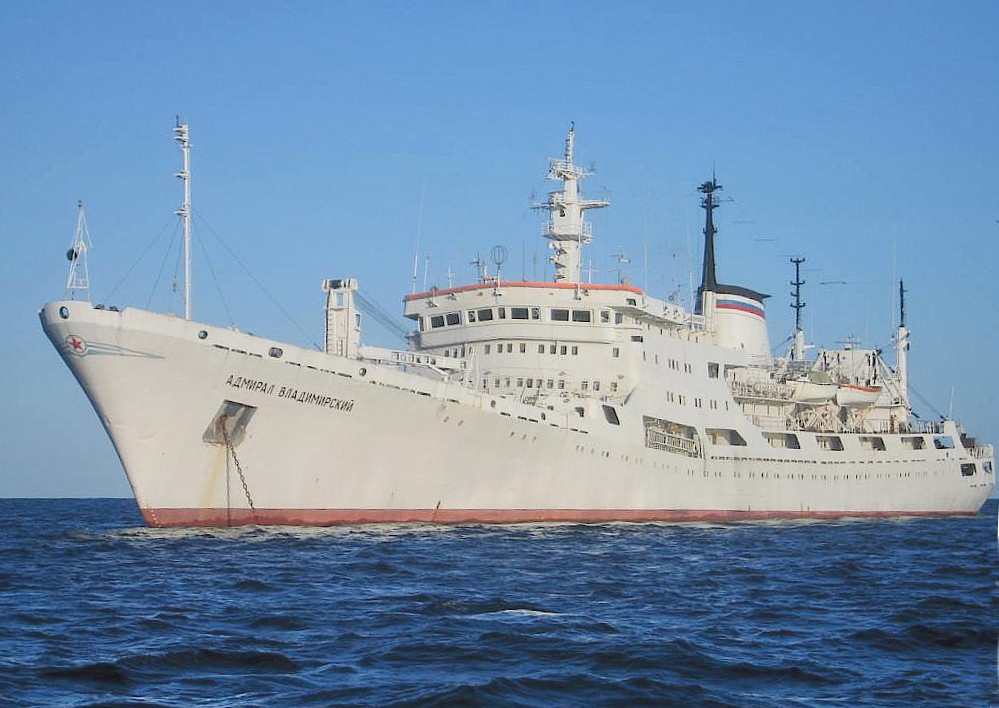
Survey ship Admiral Vladimirsky (1975) of the Hydrographic Service of the Soviet Union

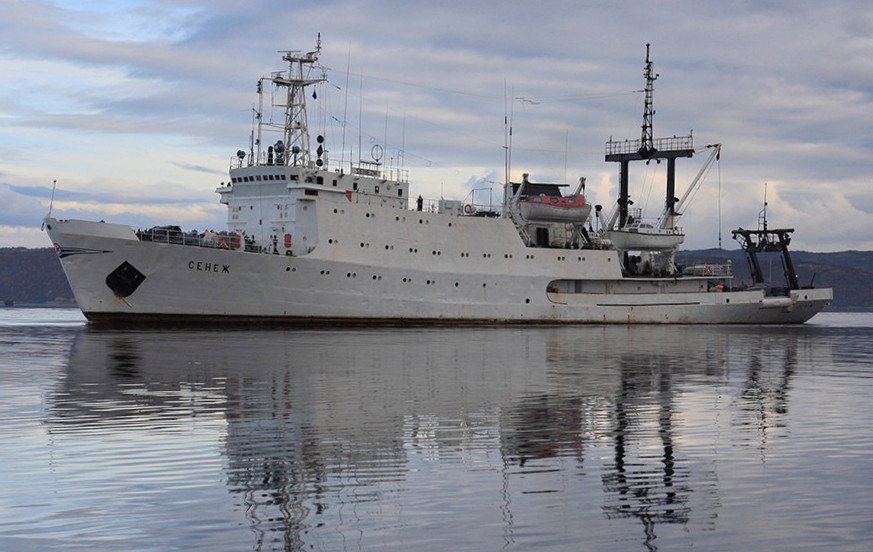
Northern Fleet hydrographic survey ship Senezh (1979) in Severomorsk

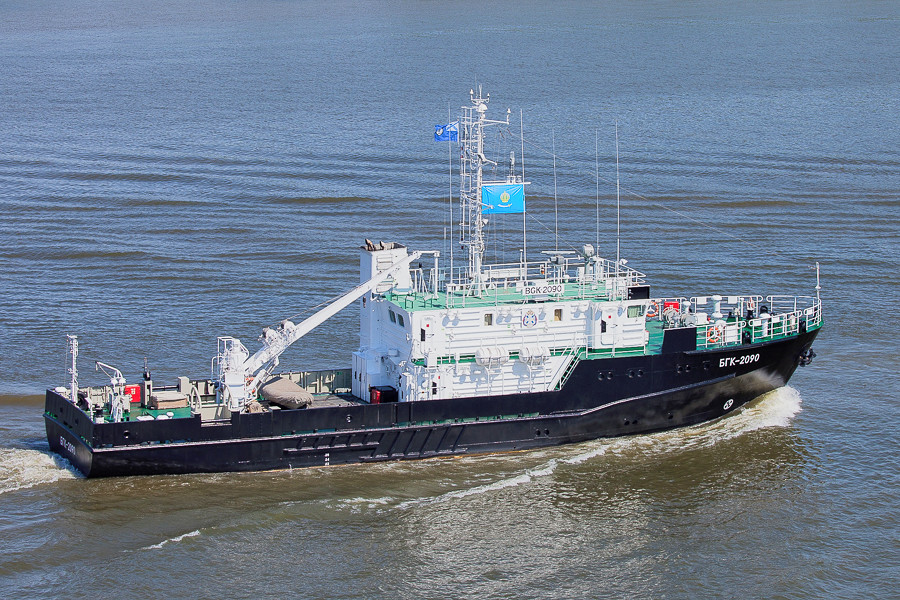
Baklan class hydrographic survey ship BGK-2090 in Astrakhan

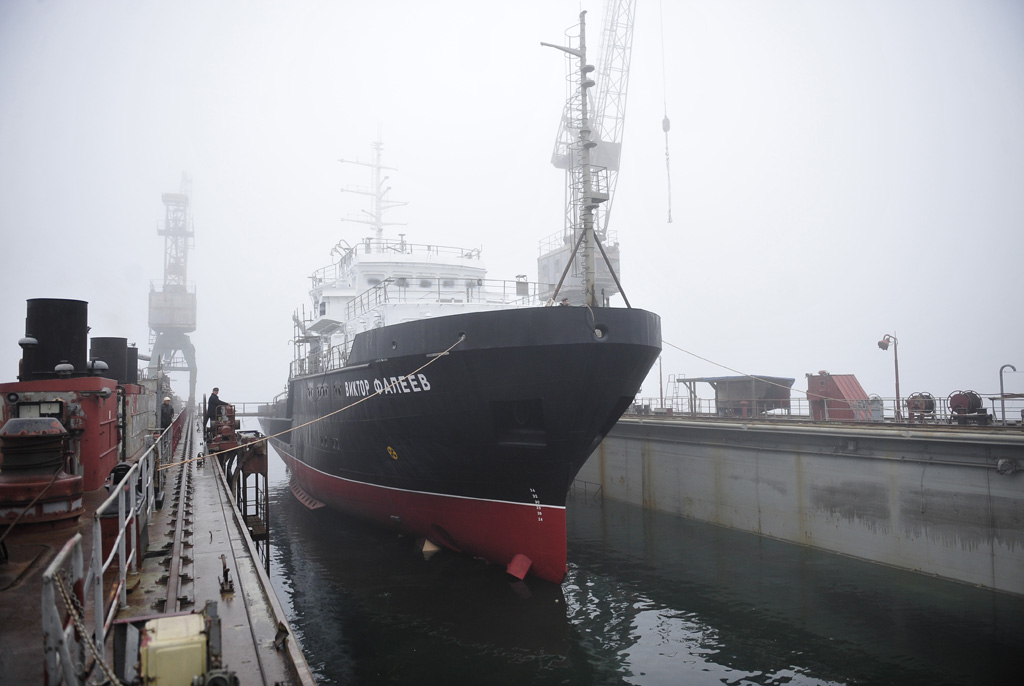
Viktor Faleyev hydrographic survey vessel. Launching ceremony (2011) in Maly Uliss Bay

== See also ==
- Admiralty Board (Russian Empire)
- Arctic Ocean Hydrographic Expedition
- Arctic and Antarctic Research Institute
- List of lighthouses in Russia
- List of Russian admirals
- Russian lightvessels
- Northern Sea Route
- Spy ship
- Stone of Tmutarakan, allegedly one of the first hydrographic documents in Russia.
