= List of tallest lighthouses =

This is a list of the tallest lighthouses, by tower height (as opposed to focal height, i.e. height of the lamp of a lighthouse from water level). The list includes only "traditional lighthouses", as defined by The Lighthouse Directory, i.e. buildings built by navigation safety authorities primarily as an aid to navigation. As such, its information regarding construction, year, and notes is from the list of tallest lighthouses at The Lighthouse Directory. Sources are given for all other information. Heights are from the United States Coast Guard Light List for the United States and from NGA List of Lights for the rest of the world, unless a better source exists. Where several lighthouses share the same height, they share the same position, and are all marked with "=".

Order	Name	Construction	Image	Height	Steps	Location	Country	Year	Remarks
1	Île Vierge Lighthouse	Stone (granite)		271 feet (83 m)	397; 400	Finistère	France	1902	Tallest traditional
2	Lighthouse of Genoa	Stone		249 feet (76 m)	365	Genoa	Italy	1543	Tallest in the Mediterranean World's fourth oldest
3	Phare de Gatteville	Stone (granite)		247 feet (75 m)	365	Gatteville-le-Phare	France	1835	
4	Lesnoy Mole Rear Range Light	Metal		239 feet (73 m)		Saint Petersburg	Russia	1986+	Tallest in Russia, tallest range light
5	Mulantou Lighthouse	Concrete		237 feet (72 m)		Hainan	China	1995	Tallest in Asia
6	Baishamen Lighthouse	Concrete		236 feet (72 m)		Hainan	China	2000+	
7	Punta Penna Lighthouse	Concrete		233 feet (71 m)	307	Vasto	Italy	1906	
7	Osinovetsky Light	Stone		233 feet (71 m)	366	Lake Ladoga	Russia	1910?	
7	Storozhenskiy Light	Stone		233 feet (71 m)	399	Lake Ladoga	Russia	1911	
10	Cordouan lighthouse	Stone		223 feet (68 m)	311	Gironde	France	1611	
10	Vittoria Light	Stone		223 feet (68 m)	285	Trieste	Italy	1927	
11	Wangerooge	Reinforced concrete		220 feet (67.2 m)		Wangerooge	Germany	1969	
12	Recalada a Bahía Blanca Light	Cast iron skeletal		220 feet (67 m)	331	Monte Hermoso	Argentina	1906	Tallest in the Southern Hemisphere
13	Maasvlakte Light	Concrete		216 feet (66 m)	295	Maasvlakte	Netherlands	1974	Tallest in the Netherlands, inactive
13	Planier Light	Stone		216 feet (66 m)		Marseille	France	1959	
15	Campen Lighthouse	Steel skeletal		213 feet (65 m)	320	Ems (river)	Germany	1891	
16	Phare d'Eckmühl	Granite		213 feet (65 m)	307	Penmarc'h	France	1897	
17	Świnoujście Lighthouse	Brick		212 feet (65 m)	300	Świnoujście	Poland	1857	Tallest brick lighthouse, tallest in Poland
18	Adziogol Lighthouse	Steel		211 feet (64 m)		Kherson	Ukraine	1911	Tallest in Ukraine
18	Cape Hatteras Light	Brick		210 feet (64 m)	268	Hatteras Island, NC	United States	1870	Tallest in North America
20	Bari Light	Stone		205 feet (62 m)	380	Bari	Italy	1869	
20	Chipiona Light	Stone		205 feet (62 m)	344	Chipiona	Spain	1867	Tallest in Spain
22	Lighthouse of Praia da Barra	Stone		203 feet (62 m)	291	Aveiro	Portugal	1893	Tallest in Portugal
22	Calcanhar Lighthouse	Reinforced concrete		203 feet (62 m)	277	Touros	Brazil	1912	Tallest in Brazil
22	El Rincón Light	Concrete		203 feet (62 m)		Near Verde Peninsula, Buenos Aires	Argentina	1925	
25	Voslapp Range Rear Light	Concrete		202 feet (62 m)		Wilhelmshaven	Germany	1962	
26	Roches-Douvres Light	Stone		197 feet (60 m)		Côtes-d'Armor	France	1954	
26	Borkum Großer Light	Brick		197 feet (60 m)	315	Borkum	Germany	1879	
26	Nosy Alañaña Light	Concrete		197 feet (60 m)		Toamasina	Madagascar	1932	Tallest in Africa

== See also ==
- List of lighthouses and lightvessels
