= Alexey Nagayev =

Russian hydrographer, cartographer, and admiral

Alexey Ivanovich Nagayev
- Алексей Иванович Нагаев
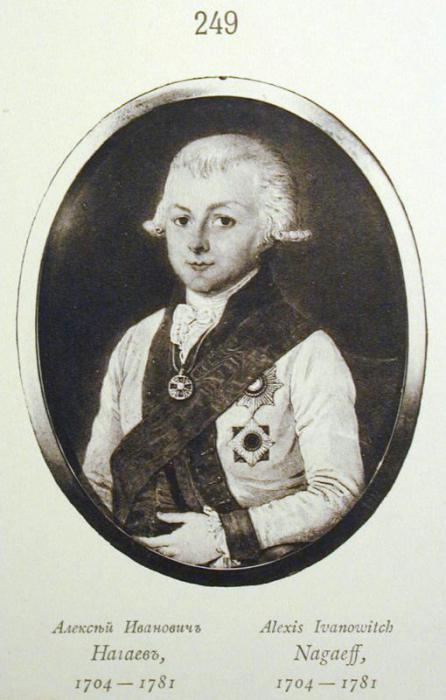
- 1909 depiction
- Born: 17 March 1704; Sertyakino, Tsardom of Russia
- Died: 8 January 1781 (aged 76); Saint Petersburg, Russian Empire
- Military career
- Allegiance: Tsardom of Russia; Russian Empire
- Branch: Imperial Russian Navy
- Rank: Admiral
- Commands: 32-gun frigates "Chevalier" and "Mercurius"; 66-gun ship "Fridemaker"; Russian Hydrographic Service
- Awards: Order of Saint Alexander Nevsky; Order of Saint Anna

Alexey Ivanovich Nagayev (Russian: Алексей Иванович Нагаев, March 17, 1704, Sertyakino – January 8, 1781, Saint Petersburg) was a Russian hydrographer, cartographer and an admiral.

== Biography ==
Born in a family of the lesser nobility, he graduated from the Saint Petersburg Naval Academy and later found employment there. During the Seven Years' War Nagayev headed the hydrographic expedition to the Prussian shores. He also compiled the first atlases of the Bering Sea and Baltic Sea, which were published in 1752. Despite the absence of a meridian grid, Nagayev's maps were used for a further fifty years. In 1764-65 Nagayev became the supreme commander of the Kronstadt port. He was promoted to the rank of admiral in 1769.

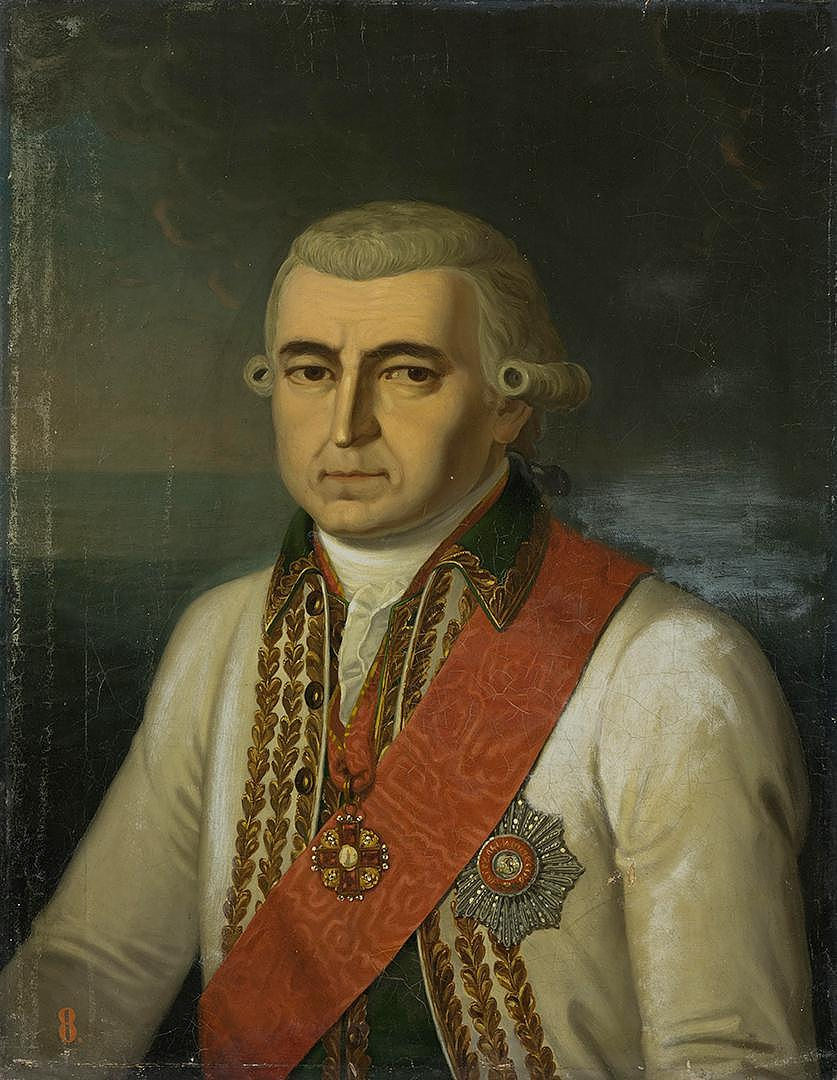
Nagayev by Aleksandr A. Fomin (1824), Hermitage

== Honours ==
A bay in the Okhotsk Sea is named after him.

- Order of Saint Alexander Nevsky
- Order of Saint Anna

== See also ==
- Russian Hydrographic Service
