= List of lighthouses in Russia =

This is a list of current and historic lighthouses and lightvessels in Russia. On saltwater, Russia has had lighthouses on the Black Sea, on the Baltic Sea in the Kaliningrad Oblast exclave, on the Gulf of Finland approaching St. Petersburg, on the Arctic Ocean (including a series of nuclear-powered ones), and on the Pacific Ocean. It has had lighthouses on freshwater of Lake Ladoga, on the Volga and Don Rivers, on the Caspian Sea, on Lake Baikal, in Siberia on the great Ob and Yenisey Rivers, and elsewhere.

== Lighthouses ==
Notable Russian lighthouses include:

Name	Image	Water body	Region	Location	Year built	Notes
Anapa Lighthouse Анапский маяк		Eastern Black Sea	Krasnodar Krai	Anapa	1955	An older lighthouse from 1909 was destroyed in 1943 during World War II.
Aniva Lighthouse		Pacific Ocean	Sakhalin Oblast	Aniva Bay; 46.01896°N 143.4140°E	1939	Japanese-built.
Bryusa Lighthouse		Pacific Ocean	Primorsky Krai	10 km east of Slavyanka	1913	
Derbent Lighthouse		Caspian Sea	Dagestan	Derbent; 42°03′41″N 48°17′45″E	1 May 1853	It is the southernmost lighthouse in Russia. It is located in the center of the city and about half a kilometer from the coastline. The lighthouse is included in the list of protected monuments of Russia and is included in the historical list of UNESCO.
Doob Point Lighthouse		Eastern Black Sea	Krasnodar Krai	Novorossiysk Bay	1879	
Gelendzhik Lighthouse Геленджикский маяк		Eastern Black Sea	Krasnodar Krai	Gelendzhik Bay		This lighthouse is located 5 kilometres (3.1 mi) south of Gelendzhik.
Kabotazhnaya Gavan Rear Light		Gulf of Finland	St. Petersburg	Kronstadt		The tower serves as rear light in a range of leading lights for the Kronstadt naval station.
Lesnoy Mole Rear Range Light		Gulf of Finland	St. Petersburg	St. Petersburg; 59°52′40.2″N 30°12′58.96″E		At a height of 73 metres (239 ft) it is the fourth tallest "traditional lighthouse" in the world, the tallest in Russia, and the tallest leading light in the world.
Makhachkala Lighthouse		Caspian Sea	Dagestan	Makhachkala; 42°59′07″N 47°29′56″E	1852	It is an operating lighthouse.Landmark of the city.
Osinovetsky Light		Lake Ladoga	Leningrad Oblast	Kokorevo; 60°7′7.6″N 31°4′49.6″E	1905	At a height of 70 metres (230 ft) it is the eighth tallest "traditional" lighthouse in the world. It is a slightly shorter twin of Storozhenskiy Light.
Sommers		Eastern Gulf of Finland	Leningrad Oblast	Sommers skerry, Gulf of Vyborg; 60°12′N 27°39′E	1945	The first lighthouse on this islet was built in 1808 and another one was erected in 1866. The latter lighthouse was destroyed by Finnish forces at the onset of the Winter War of 1939-40 and the personnel were evacuated. After the 1944 peace treaty between Finland and the Soviet Union, the island of Sommers was given to the Soviets, who also constructed a new truss lighthouse.
Storozhenskiy Light		Lake Ladoga	Leningrad Oblast	Storozhno; 60°31′38.92″N 32°37′18.01″E	1907	At a height of 71 metres (233 ft) it is among the tallest lighthouses in the world, and the fourth tallest stone lighthouse. It is a twin of the slightly shorter Osinovetsky Light.
Styrsudden Lighthouse		Eastern Gulf of Finland	Leningrad Oblast	Ozerki; 60°11′09.0″N 29°01′47.6″E	1955	The station was established in 1873. The historic lighthouse was destroyed during World War II and replaced by a temporary tower. 28 m (92 ft) round cylindrical concrete tower with lantern and gallery, rising from a 1-story cement block base, was built in 1955.
Sudzhukskiy Lighthouse Суджукский_маяк		Eastern Black Sea	Krasnodar Krai	Western entrance to Novorossiysk Bay		
Svyatoy Nos Святоносский маяк		White Sea	Kola Peninsula	Svyatoy Nos, Murmansk Oblast	1863	This is Russia's oldest active lighthouse in the Arctic. The first steam-powered fog horn in Russia was installed at this site in 1872. The lighthouse was declared a national historic monument in 2002.
Tolbukhin Lighthouse Толбухин маяк		Gulf of Finland	Leningrad Oblast	7 kilometres (4.3 mi) northwest off Kotlin Island	1810	Designed by Andreyan Zakharov, this is the oldest active lighthouse in north-western Russia.
Utrish Lighthouse Утришский маяк		Eastern Black Sea	Krasnodar Krai	Utrish island southeast of Anapa		The station was established in 1911. The first lighthouse may date back to the 1920s but is apparently out of use and deteriorating. Another lighthouse has been installed on a nearby and hosts a memorial for fishermen killed in World War II.

== See also ==
- Lists of lighthouses and lightvessels
- Russian Hydrographic Service
- Russian lightvessels
