= Bari Light =

Lighthouse in Bari, Italy

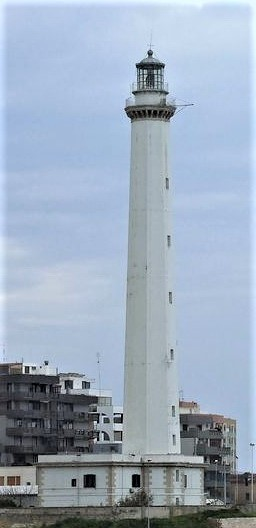
- Bari Light in 2009
- Location: Bari, Italy
- Coordinates: 41°08′21″N 16°50′42″E

Tower
- Constructed: 1869
- Construction: stone (tower)
- Height: 62 metres (203 ft)
- Shape: tapered octagonal tower with balcony and lantern, with 2-story masonry keeper's house
- Markings: white tower, gray metallic lantern
- Power source: mains electricity
- Operator: Italian Navy

Light
- Focal height: 66 metres (217 ft)
- Lens: type OR 500
- Intensity: AL 1000 W
- Range: 24 nmi (44 km; 28 mi) (main light), 18 nmi (33 km; 21 mi) (auxiliary light)
- Characteristic: Fl(3) W 20s
- Italy no.: 3706 E.F

Bari Light, also known as Punta San Cataldo di Bari Lighthouse (Italian: Faro di Punta San Cataldo di Bari) is an active lighthouse situated at the base of Molo San Cataldo, on the west side of the harbour of Bari on the Adriatic Sea, in the southern region of Apulia, Italy.

== Description ==
The lighthouse, built in 1869, consists of an octagonal stone tower, 62 metres (203 ft) high, with balcony and lantern, rising from a 2-storey keeper's house. It is the 24th tallest "traditional lighthouse" in the world. The tower, characterized by six windows aligned on the seaward side, is painted white and the lantern dome in grey metallic.

The light is positioned at 66 metres (217 ft) above sea level and emits three white flashes in a 20 seconds period, visible up to a distance of 24 nautical miles (44 km; 28 mi). The lighthouse is completely automated and managed by the Marina Militare with the identification code number 3706 E.F.

== See also ==
- List of tallest lighthouses in the world
- List of lighthouses in Italy
