= Storozhenskiy Light =

Lighthouse in Leningrad, Russia

Storozhenskiy Light Storozhno
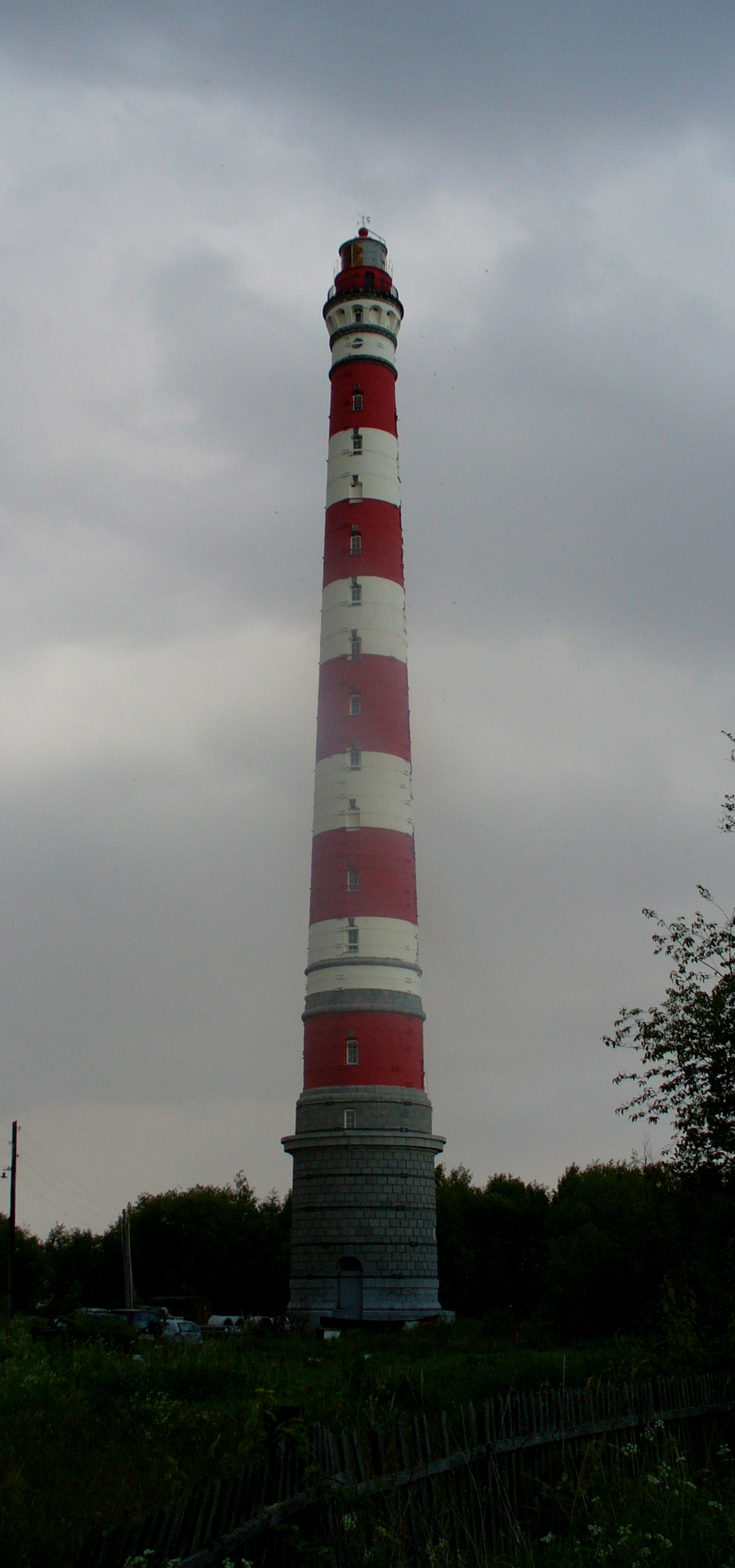
- Storozhenskiy Light in 2008
- Location: Lake Ladoga; Leningrad Oblast; Russia
- Coordinates: 60°31′53.11″N 32°37′33.58″E

Tower
- Constructed: 1907
- Construction: stone tower
- Height: 71 metres (233 ft)
- Shape: cylindrical tower with balcony and lantern
- Markings: tower with red and white horizontal bands, red lantern dome

Light
- Focal height: 76 metres (249 ft)
- Lens: Fresnel lens
- Characteristic: Fl WRG

Storozhenskiy Light (Russian: Стороженский маяк), also known as Storozhno Light, is an active lighthouse in Lake Ladoga, in the Leningrad Oblast, Russia. It is located on a headland on the eastern side of the lake, separating the Svir Bay of the lake from the Volkhov Bay, at the village of Storozhno.

At a height of 233 feet (71 m) it is the seventh-tallest "traditional lighthouse" in the world, and the fourth-tallest stone lighthouse. It is a twin of the slightly shorter Osinovetsky Light.

The site is accessible and the tower is open by arrangement with the keeper.

== See also ==
- List of lighthouses in Russia
- List of tallest lighthouses in the world
