= List of lighthouses in Madagascar =

This is a list of lighthouses in Madagascar.

Name	Year built	Location & coordinates	Class of light	Focal height (metres)	NGA number	Admiralty number	Range (nautical miles)
Analalava Lighthouse	1910		Oc(2) WRG 6s	62	112-32672	D7048	10 (white), 7 (red), 6 (green)
Antalaha Range Front Lighthouse	1955		F G	7	112-32400	D6944	11
Antalaha Range Rear Lighthouse	1955		Ov (2) W 6s	82	112-32404	D6944.1	13
Antsiranana Port Lighthouse	1960s		Iso WRG 4s	13	112-32336	D6922	13 (white), 10 (red), 9 (green)
Cap d'Ambre Lighthouse	1900s		Fl W 5s	70	112-32328	D6914	23
Cap Andranomody Lighthouse	1960s		Fl R 4s	11	112-32360	D6919	5
Cap Est Lighthouse	2007		Fl(2) W 10s	70	112-32408	D6946	23
Cap Masoala Lighthouse	1970s		Fl(5) W 20s	80	112-32412	D6948.3	18
Cap Miné Lighthouse	1890s		Fl(3) W 15s	47	112-32356	D6918	23
Cap Saint-André Lighthouse	2007		Fl(2) W 10s	26	112-32628	D7033.7	20
Cap Sainte-Marie Lighthouse	1971		Fl W 10s	192	112-32576	D7022	23
Charbonnier Lighthouse			Oc W 6s	21	112-32548	D7014	10
Emokala Range Front Lighthouse	1939		F G	15	112-32520	D6998	9
Emokala Range Rear Lighthouse	1939		Fl(4) W 25s	44	112-32524	D6998.1	26
Île aux Nattes Lighthouse	1914		F W	34	112-32452	D6958	13
Îlot des Aigrettes Lighthouse	1898		Oc(2) WRG 6s	18	112-32332	D6920	10 (white), 7 (red), 6 (green)
Îlot Madame Lighthouse	1880s		Oc G 4s	9	112-32444	D6952	5
Jetée Schneider Lighthouse			Oc(2) R 8s	9	112-32648	D7041	5
Lakaria Hill Lighthouse	1934		Oc W 6s	54	112-32456	D6960	10
Mahanoro Lighthouse	1936		Oc W 6s	23	112-32496	D6988	10
Maintirano Lighthouse	1940s		F W	29	112-32620	D7032	10
Manakara Middle Range Rear Lighthouse			Q W	19	112-32532	D7000.1	16
Manakara Residency Lighthouse	1955		Oc(2) WRG 6s	14	112-32544	D7006	12 (white), 9 (red), 8 (green)
Mananjary Transverse Range Front Lighthouse			Oc G 4s	15	112-32508	D6995	12
Mananjary Transverse Range Rear Lighthouse			F G	18	112-32512	D6995.1	12
Nosy Akao Lighthouse	1939		Fl(4) W 20s	46	112-32364	D6930	19
Nosy Alañaña Light	1933	Toamasina Province	Fl(3) W 25s	60	112-32460	D6972	23
Nosy Anambo Lighthouse	1911		Oc(3) WR 12s	42	112-32728	D7070	14 (white), 10 (red)
Nosy Béhentona Lighthouse	1954		Fl (2+1) W 15s	32	112-32416	D6948.5	10
Nosy Beza Range Front Lighthouse			Iso W 4s	19	112-32660	D7035	13
Nosy Beza Range Rear Lighthouse			Oc W 6s	58	112-32664	D7035.1	13
Nosy Faly Lighthouse	1939		Fl WR 4s	75	112-32716	D7068	8 (white), 6 (red)
Nosy Iranja Lighthouse	1909		Fl W 5s	75	112-32684	D7056	17
Nosy Lava Lighthouse	1955		Oc W 6s	28	112-32600	D7027	10
Nosy Vorona Lighthouse	1880s		Fl(2) WR 6s	16	112-32692	D7062	8 (white), 5 (red)
Pointe Albrand Lighthouse	1931		Fl W 5s	80	112-32436	D6950	22
Pointe du Caïman Lighthouse	1900		Oc(3) WRG 12s	42	112-32652	D7036	14 (white), 10 (red), 9 (green)
Pointe Katsépé Lighthouse	1901		Fl W 10s	121	112-32640	D7034	23
Pointe de Sable Lighthouse	1900		Oc (2+1) W 12s	11	112-32644	D7037	12
Pointe Tanio Lighthouse	1990s		Oc(3) WRG 12s	35	112-32476	D6976	15 (white), 11 (red), 11 (green)
Rocher aux Sorciers Lighthouse	1910		F WR	18	112-32440	D6956	8 (white), 6 (red)
Salamazay Range Front Lighthouse			Q W	16	112-32464	D6973	10
Salamazay Range Rear Lighthouse			Q W	23	112-32468	D6973.1	14
Tanikely Lighthouse	1908		Fl(3) W 15s	57	112-32688	D7058	11
Toamasina Immeuble Portuaire Lighthouse			Fl (2+1) WRG 15s	27	112-32480	D6978	14 (white), 11 (red), 11 (green)
Tôlanaro Entrance Range Front Lighthouse	1954		Oc W 4s	25	112-32556	D7019	18
Tôlanaro Entrance Range Rear Lighthouse	1954		Oc W 4s	47	112-32560	D7019.1	18
Tôlanaro Second Range Front Lighthouse	1954		F R	12	112-32564	D7020	7
Tôlanaro Second Range Rear Lighthouse			Oc(2) W 6s	38	112-32568	D7020.1	15
Toliara Range Front Lighthouse	1921		Q R	12	112-32580	D7024	10
Anosy Rear Beacon	1921		Oc(2) W 6s	19	112-32584	D7024.1	10
Vohémar Beacon No. 4 Lighthouse			F R	7	112-32376	D6938	5
Vohémar Range Front Lighthouse	1919		F G	4	112-32368	D6936	5
Vohémar Range Rear Lighthouse	1919		Oc W 4s	63	112-32372	D6936.1	10

== See also ==
- Lists of lighthouses and lightvessels
