= Osinovetsky Light =

Lighthouse in Russia

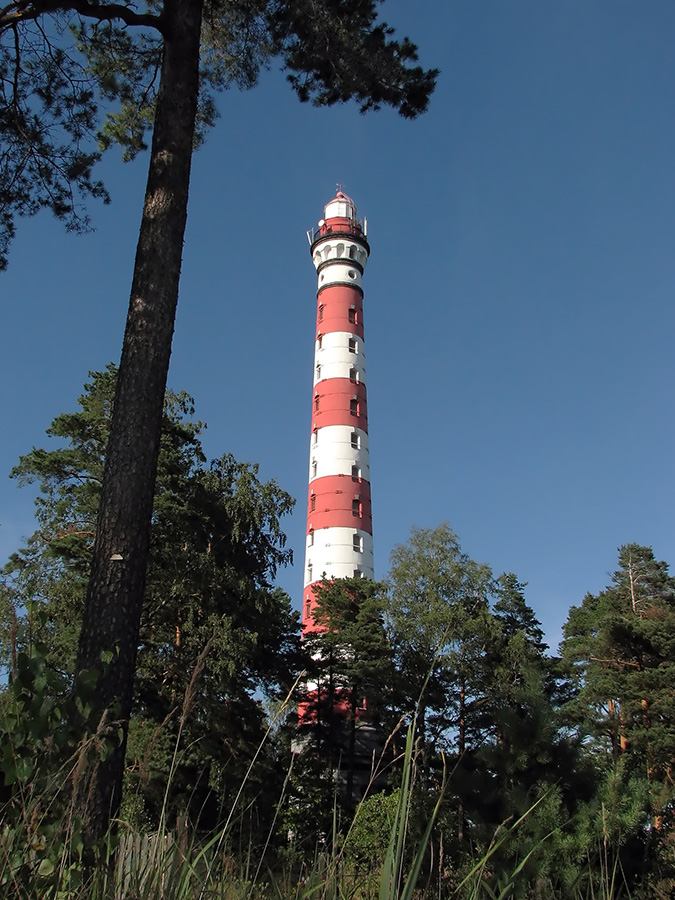
- Osinovetsky Light in 2007
- Location: Lake Ladoga; Leningrad Oblast; Russia
- Coordinates: 60°7′7.6″N 31°4′49.6″E

Tower
- Constructed: 1905
- Construction: stone tower
- Height: 230 feet (70 m)
- Shape: cylindrical tower with balcony and lantern
- Markings: red and white bands tower, white lantern
- Heritage: regional cultural heritage site in Russia

Light
- Focal height: 243 feet (74 m)
- Characteristic: Fl WRG

Osinovetsky Light (Russian: Осиновецкий маяк) is an active lighthouse in Lake Ladoga, in Leningrad Oblast, Russia. It is located on a headland near the southwest corner of the lake near Kokorevo. The light marks the west side of the entrance to the southernmost bay of the lake, leading to the Neva entrance.

At a height of 230 feet (70 m) it is the eighth tallest "traditional" lighthouse in the world. It is a slightly shorter twin of Storozhenskiy Light.

The lighthouse served as an important landmark in the Road of Life during the Siege of Leningrad (September 8, 1941 to January 27, 1944).

The former lightkeeper, Sergey Shulyatev, has had this position from 1987 to 2010, being then the oldest lighthouse keeper in Russia.

== See also ==
- List of lighthouses in Russia
- List of tallest lighthouses in the world
