= Lighthouse of Praia da Barra =

Lighthouse at Praia da Barra, Gafanha da Nazaré, Ílhavo, Aveirom, Portugal

Lighthouse of Praia da Barra Farol da Praia da Barra Farol de Aveiro
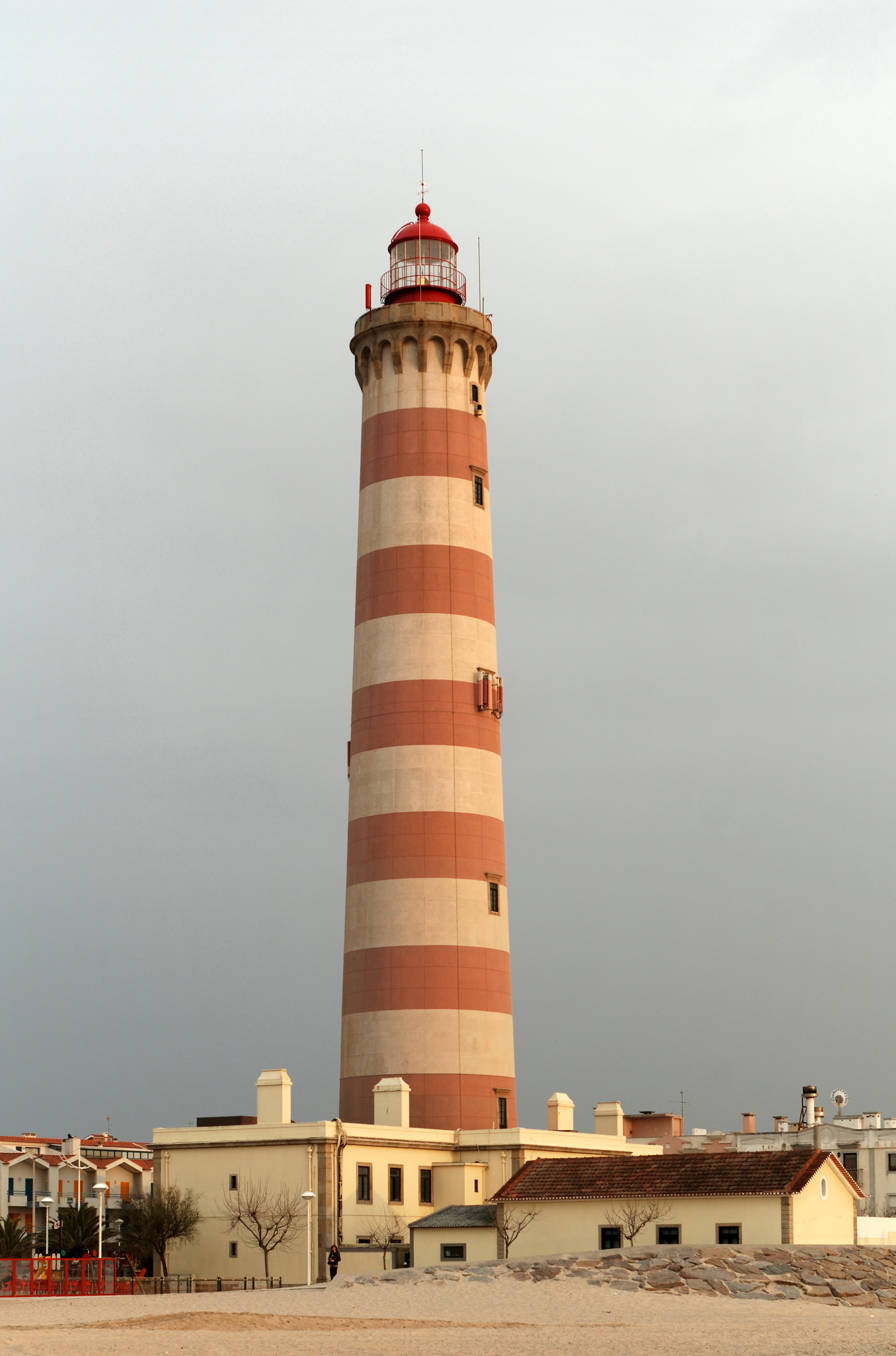
- View of the lighthouse
- Location: Portugal Ílhavo, Gafanha da Nazaré
- Coordinates: 40°38′34.14″N 8°44′52.07″W

Tower
- Constructed: 1893
- Foundation: 2-story keeper's house
- Construction: stone tower
- Automated: 1990
- Height: 62 m (203 ft)
- Shape: cylindrical tower with balcony and lantern
- Markings: red and white bands tower, red lantern
- Power source: mains electricity
- Operator: Directorate for Lighthouses (Direcção de Faróis)
- Heritage: Unclassified

Light
- Focal height: 66 m (217 ft)
- Lens: 3rd order Fresnel lens
- Range: 23 nmi (43 km)
- Characteristic: Fl (4) W 13s.
- Portugal no.: PT-095

The Lighthouse of Praia da Barra, also known as the Aveiro Lighthouse (Portuguese: Farol de Aveiro/Farol da Praia da Barra), is an active lighthouse in the civil parish of Gafanha da Nazaré, municipality of Ílhavo, in the Portuguese district of Aveiro. Situated on the coastal Praia da Barra, at the southern margin of the Ria de Aveiro, it is the tallest lighthouse in Portugal, with a height of 203 feet (62 m) overseeing the barrier beach and exposed to Atlantic storms. It is open to the public and visits are held on Wednesdays from 14:00 to 17:00.

== History ==
On 8 January 1856, a dispatch determined the need for a lighthouse on the coastal area of the Ria de Aveiro at the mouth with the Atlantic Ocean; the Director das Obras Públicas do Distrito de Aveiro (Aveiro District Director of Public Works), in accordance with the Porto captaincy and Director Maquinista de Faróis (Lighthouse Engineering Director), indicated the appropriate location for a new lighthouse. The authorities had rejected the idea to repurpose the existing signal tower from the Fort of Barra, opting instead to custom-build a new Barra lighthouse in 1858. On October 14, 1870, a general Aveiro coast and harbour illumination plan elaborated by councilman Francisco Maria Pereira da Silva, was approved by official dispatch. The original plans for the lighthouse were approved in 1879 for an octagonal tower of 55 metres (180 ft) high.

After alterations to the original project, the lighthouse construction started in 1879 and concluded in 1893. The new Barra lighthouse replaced the services of the Hermitage of Senhora das Areias which, from the writings of friar Agostinho de Santa Maria:

...for navigators it served as lighthouse as lookout and fixed star, that, the dangers of big storms and tempests, warned those that could shipwreck, to escape from that inhuman wave, which subverts ships...

The build was initially under the direction of engineer Silvério Pereira da Silva and later by engineer José Maria de Mello e Matos, envisioning a budget of 51 contos de réis and equipped with an elevator that would eliminate the need for a 228 step winding staircase. The first beacon was from an incandescent petrol lamp and horn combination and began operating on October 15, 1893. The lighthouse would later be upgraded by a first-order lamp, with four clarions, oscillating at 2.5 seconds and with a 1.5 eclipse, and a 9.5 second interval, that allowed it to reach 20 nautical miles (37 km). In addition, a Holmes fog signal was installed at the same time to provide a warning in the fog.

By 1929, the lighthouse required repairs following several faults and failures caused by oscillations in the tower. The works carried out that year included the insulation of the main structure with wall tiles and the installation of 14 concrete columns to reinforce the building. In 1935, the signal horn was repositioned in the interior of the building following its predecessor being swept away during a storm, and a year later, the building was electrified with the installation of a generator.

In 1947, the beacon was substituted by the current installation, a small third-order Fresnel lens beacon with panels, that included four white flashes that repeated every 13 seconds, and with a 23 nautical miles (43 km) range.

In 1950, the lighthouse was connected to the public electrical network, while the 3000W lamp was replaced by a 1000W lamp.

A study was elaborated in 1954 by the Direcção-Geral dos Serviços de Urbanização (Directorate-General Urban Services), through its Serviços de Melhoramentos Urbanos (Urban Improvement Services), to examine the potential for improvement of the site position on the coast, culminating in the construction of a sea wall to protect the structure. Between 1958 and 1959, the DGEMN expanded building repairs and improvements under the auspices of the Serviços de Construção e Conservação (Construction and Conservation Services). Within the next four years an elevator was built to provide easy access to the beacon and in 1990 the light was automated.

== Architecture ==
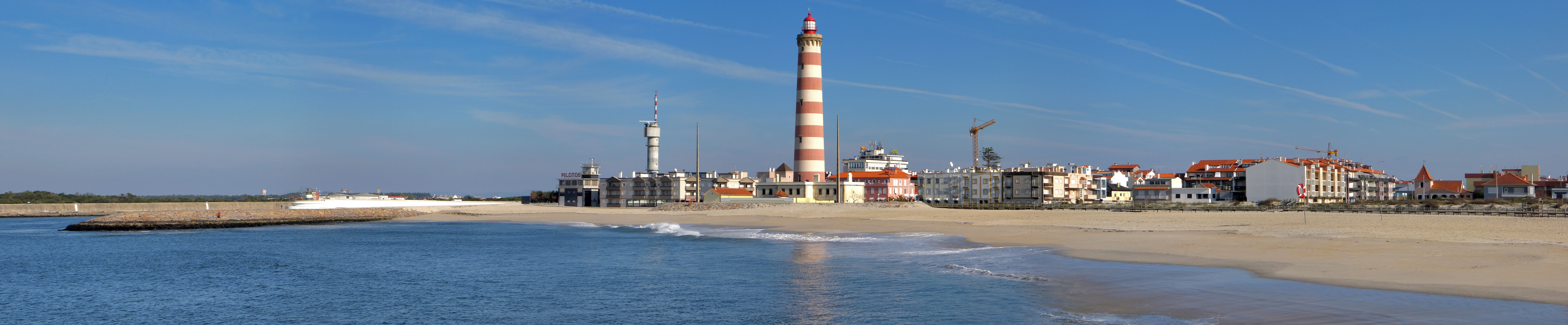
Barra Beach and Lighthouse, overview

The lighthouse, the tallest in Portugal, stands on the southern shore of the Aveiro lagoon's (Ria) narrow isthmus connecting it to the Atlantic Ocean, next to the beach in the Summer resort town of Barra, at the intersection rotunda of Avenida Fernão de Magalhães and Avenida João Corte Real. where it occupies the most prominent position in the area with its 360° balcony standing 62 metres (203 ft) high, providing westerly views to the sea, inlandwards to Aveiro city, the harbour complex, Ria and the Vouga river delta, the southerly beach resort towns of Barra, Costa Nova and nearby Gafanha fisherman towns as well as the northern shore towns of São Jacinto, Torreira and Murtosa. The lighthouse's main entrance is on the landward western side and faces a cobbled square and the town's center, while the seaward and southern side and harbour entrance is protected by the beach and an artificial straight break water positioned perpendicular to the shore line, reaching into the sea approximately 900 meters and the isthmus north shore, by an extended curved artificial breakwater about 1600 meters long. The two breakwater tips forming the south facing protected harbour entrance, are marked by navigational night lights and provide the lighthouse added protection from severe weather. Due to sea current erosion, re-enforcement work to the north side breakwater has been carried out since 2010.

The lighthouse tower including the beacon apparatus dome, stands 66 metres (217 ft) high and the light beam has a range of 23 nautical miles (43 km). The round stone tapering tower rises from a two-storey rectangular building housing the lighthouse keeper living quarters and is painted externally in red/white broad hoops, while an internal spiral staircase of 271 stone steps (followed by an additional 20 metal steps) reaches the top and the elevator moves through the middle of the spiral stairway.

== See also ==
- List of lighthouses in Portugal
- List of tallest lighthouses in the world
