= Maasvlakte Light =

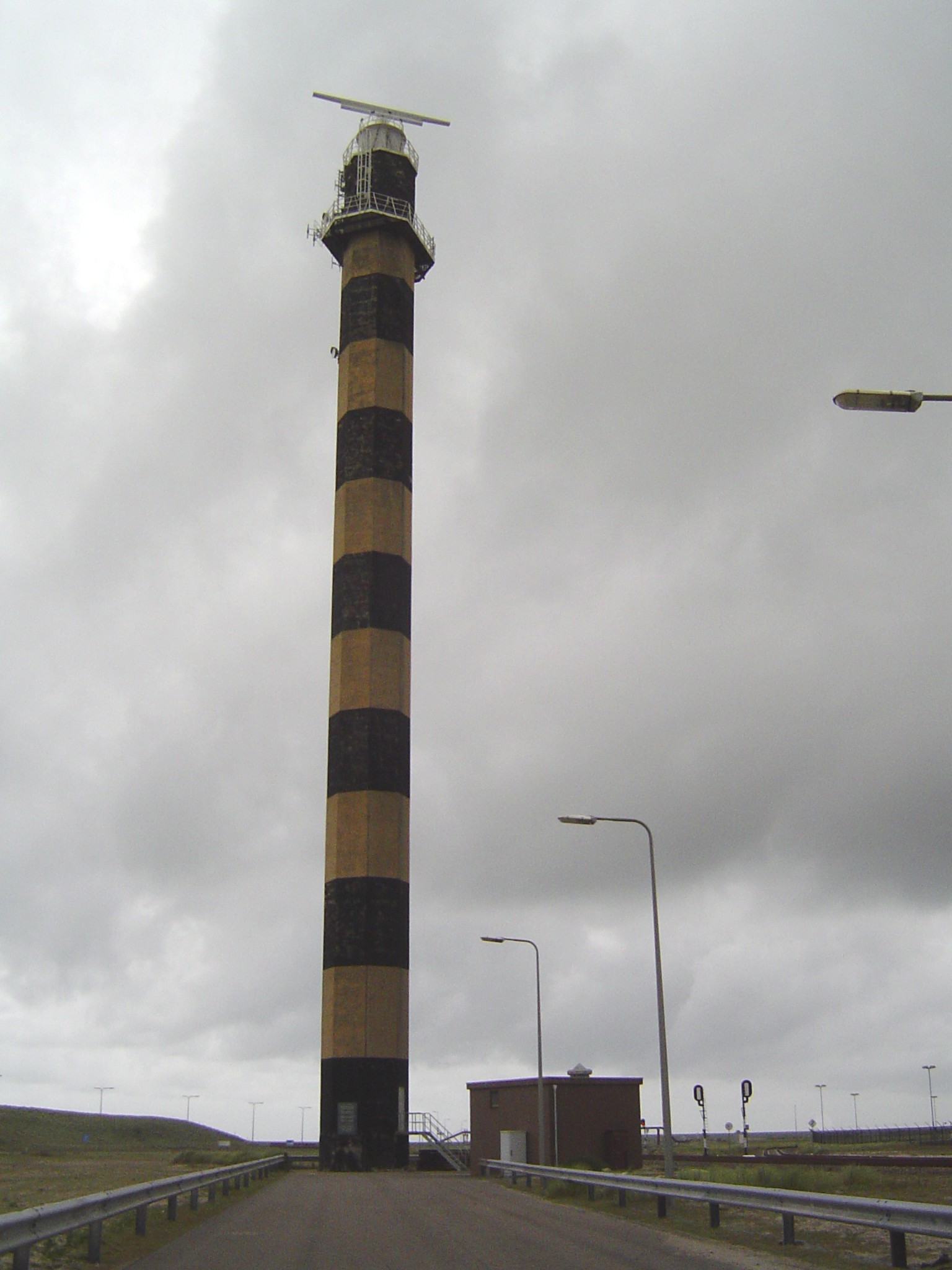
- Maasvlakte Light, 2008
- Location: Maasvlakte; Netherlands
- Coordinates: 51°58′12.17″N 4°0′51.45″E

Tower
- Constructed: 1974
- Construction: concrete tower
- Height: 216 feet (66 m)
- Shape: octagonal tower with double gallery and rotating antenna on the top
- Markings: black and yellow horizontal bands tower

Light
- First lit: 19 September 1974
- Deactivated: 2008
- Focal height: 67 metres (220 ft)
- Lens: 3rd order Fresnel lens
- Intensity: 2,500,000 cd
- Range: 28 nautical miles (52 km; 32 mi)
- Characteristic: five white flashes every 20s
- Netherlands no.: NL-0986

Maasvlakte Light is an inactive lighthouse in Maasvlakte, an industrial area in the city of Rotterdam, the Netherlands. At a height of 216 feet (66 m) it is the twelfth-tallest "traditional lighthouse" in the world, as well as the second-tallest concrete lighthouse in the world, and the tallest Dutch lighthouse.

The lighthouse is located behind the dunes and sea dike protecting Europoort, on the south side of the mouth of the Maas. It marks the entrance to the Nieuwe Waterweg.

The light was first lit on September 19, 1974. The lens were transferred from the old Hoek van Holland High Light (the old rear range light) which was decommissioned in 1974. The light was deactivated on October 31, 2008, due to changes in the harbour reducing its usefulness. The radar antenna is still in service.

The tower has 295 steps.

The site is accessible, but the tower is closed to the public.

== See also ==
- List of tallest lighthouses in the world
- List of lighthouses in the Netherlands
