= Nosy Alañaña Light =

Lighthouse in Madagascar that is the tallest in Africa

Nosy Alañaña Lighthouse Nosy Alagnagna
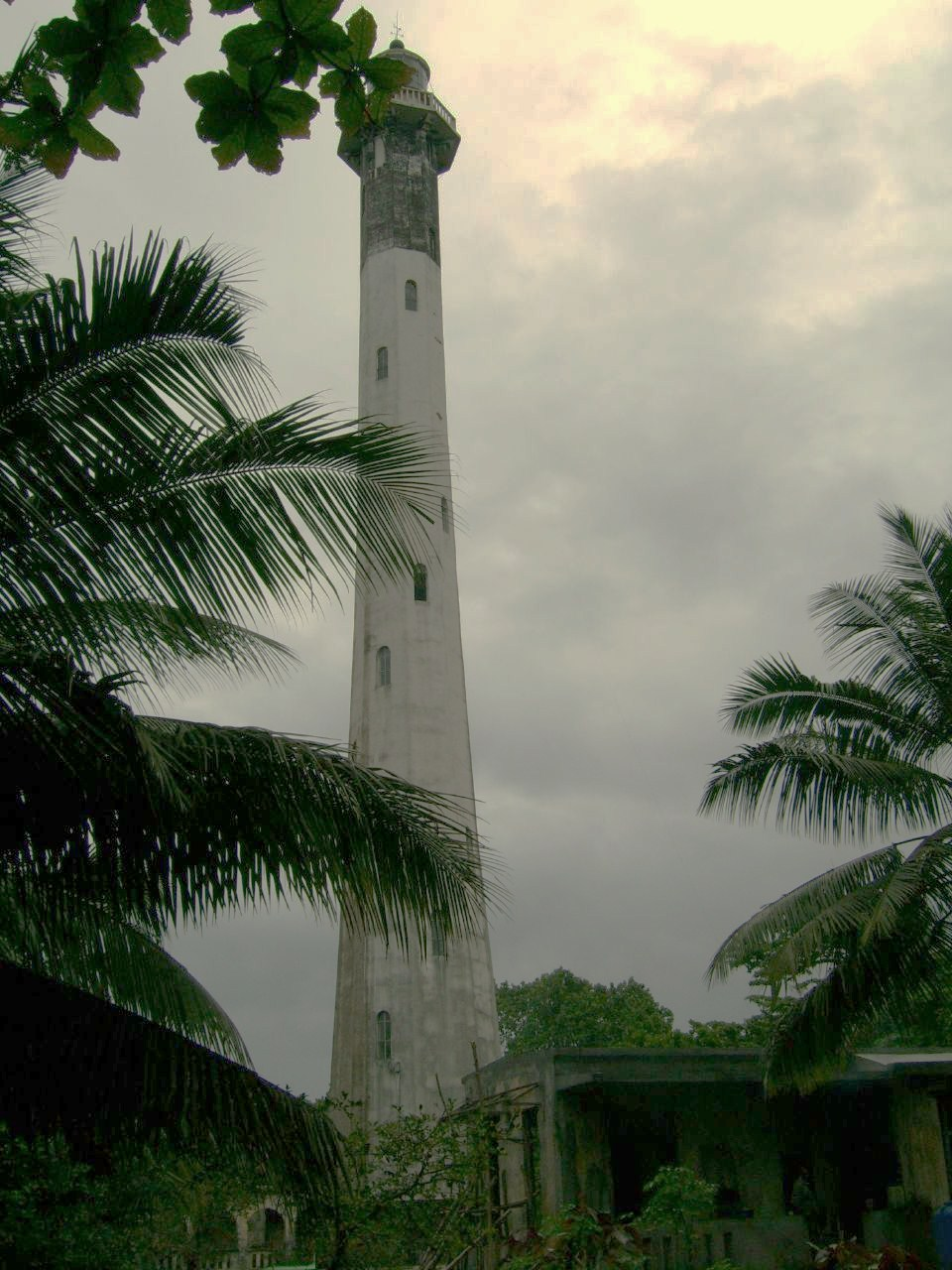
- Nosy Alañaña Light, 2006
- Location: Toamasina, Madagascar
- Coordinates: 18°2′55.45″S 49°27′36.15″E

Tower
- Constructed: 1932
- Construction: concrete tower
- Height: 197 feet (60 m)
- Shape: octagonal tower with gallery and lantern
- Markings: white tower, black lantern and gallery

Light
- Focal height: 197 feet (60 m)
- Range: 23 nautical miles (43 km; 26 mi)
- Characteristic: Fl (3) W 25s.

Nosy Alañaña Light, also known as Île aux Prunes Light (French: Phare de l'Île aux Prunes), is an active lighthouse in Île aux Prunes, Toamasina Province, Madagascar. At a height of 197 feet (60 m) it is the twenty-fourth tallest "traditional lighthouse" in the world, as well as the tallest in Africa. It is located on Île aux Prunes (Isle of Prunes, Malagasy: Nosy Alañaña), a tiny island about 16 kilometres (9.9 mi) north-northeast of Toamasina.

The island is accessible by boat, and the site is open, but the tower is closed to the public.

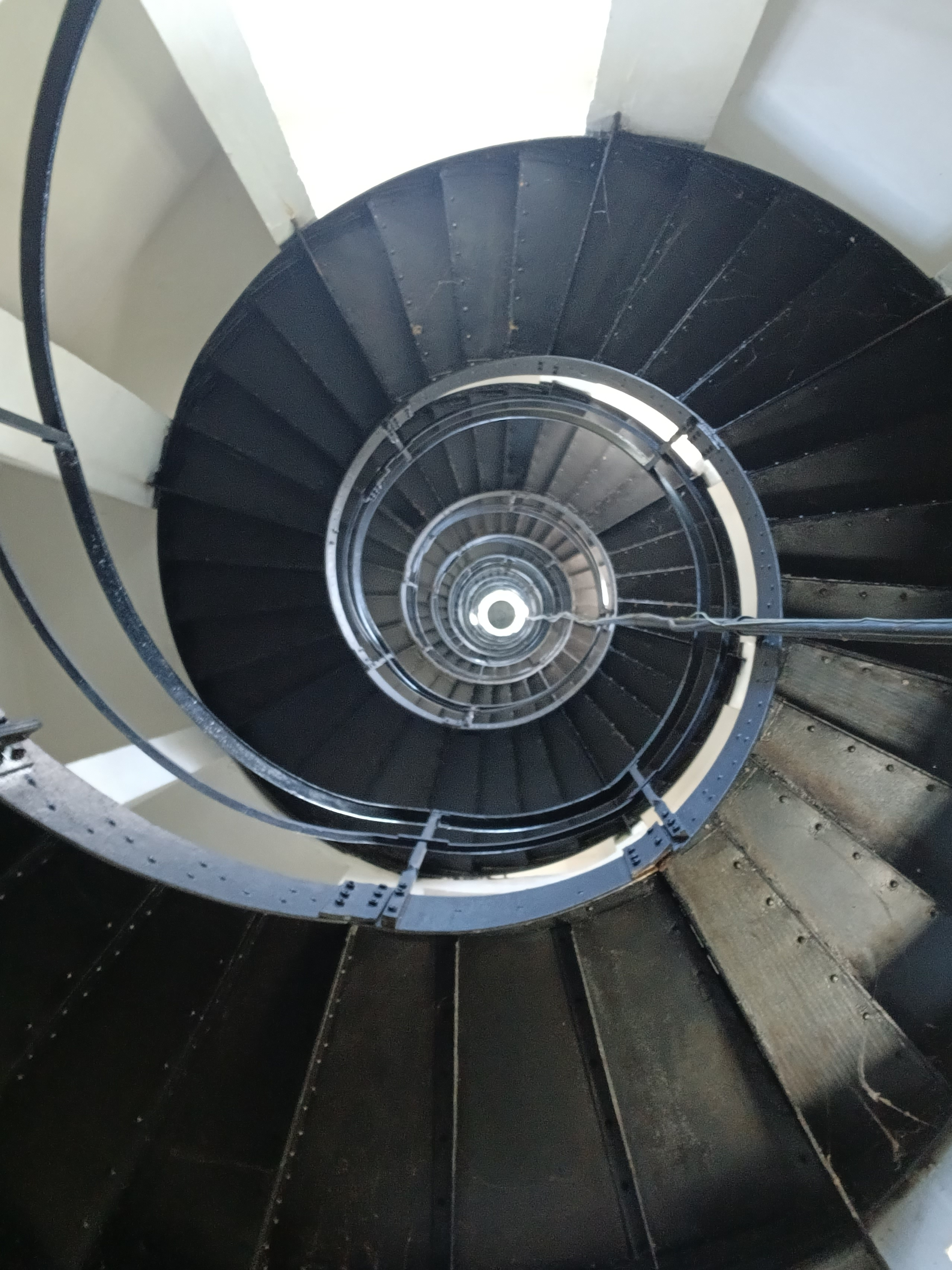

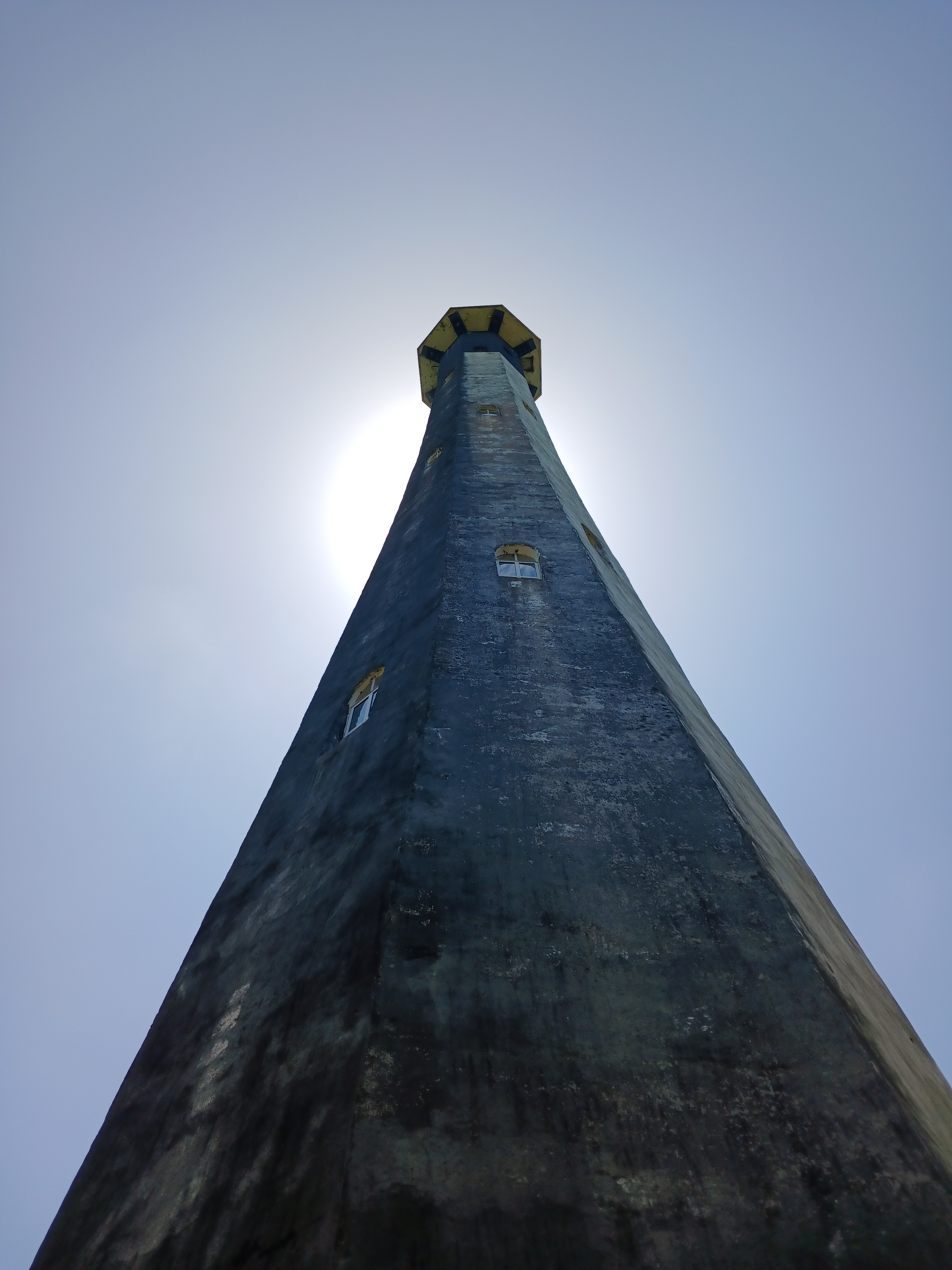
View from outside

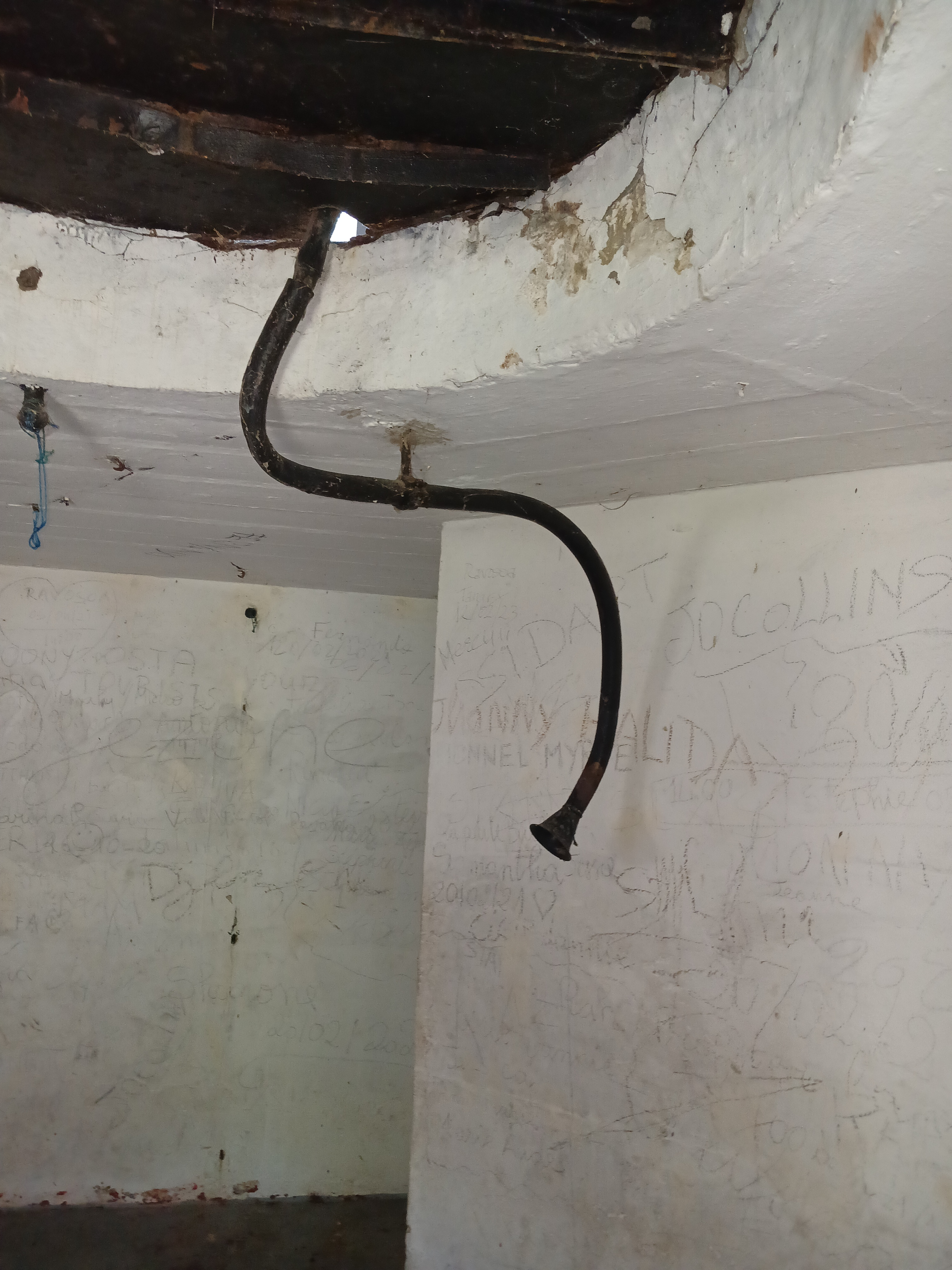
Speaking tube

== See also ==
- List of lighthouses in Madagascar
- List of tallest lighthouses in the world
