= Kokorevo =

Kokorevo Кокорево
- Village
- Location within Vologda Oblast Location within Russia
- Coordinates: 58°59′N 37°25′E
- Country: Russia
- Region: Vologda Oblast
- District: Cherepovetsky District
- Time zone: UTC+3:00

Kokorevo (Russian: Кокорево) is a rural locality (a village) in Korotovskoye Rural Settlement, Cherepovetsky District, Vologda Oblast, Russia. The population was 22 as of 2002. There are 2 streets.

== Geography ==
Kokorevo is located 59 km (37 mi) southwest of Cherepovets (the district's administrative centre) by road. Sheyno is the nearest rural locality.
