= List of survey vessels of the Royal Navy =

== Active ships ==
=== Antarctic patrol vessel ===
- HMS Protector (2011–) which carries the survey motor boat (SMB) James Caird IV.

=== Ocean survey vessels ===
- HMS Scott (1997–)

=== Coastal survey vessels ===
- Survey Motor Launch
  - HMS Magpie (2018–)

== Decommissioned ships ==
=== Antarctic patrol vessels ===
- HMS Protector (1955–70)
- HMS Endurance (1968–91)
- HMS Endurance (1991–2008)

=== Ocean survey vessels ===
- Hecla class
  - HMS Hecla (1964–97)
  - HMS Hecate (1965–90)
  - HMS Hydra (1966–86)
  - HMS Herald (1974–2001)

=== Coastal survey vessels ===
- Bulldog class
  - HMS Beagle (1968–2002)
  - HMS Bulldog (1968–2001)
  - HMS Fawn (1968–91)
  - HMS Fox (1968–89)
- HMS Roebuck (1986–2010)
- Echo-class multi–purpose survey vessels
  - HMS Echo (2003–2022) which carries SMB Sapphire.
  - HMS Enterprise (2003–2023) which carries SMB Spitfire.

=== Inshore survey vessels ===
- Echo class
  - HMS Echo (1958–85)
  - HMS Egeria (1959–85)
  - HMS Enterprise (1959–85)
- Ham class
  - HMS Waterwitch (ex–HMS Powderham) (1964–86)
  - HMS Woodlark (ex–HMS Yaxham) (1964–86)
- Ton class
  - HMS Mermaid (ex–HMS Sullington) (1964–68)
  - HMS Myrmidon (ex–HMS Edderton) (1964–68)

=== Survey Motor Launches (SML) ===
- SML 2
- SML 4
- SML 6
- SML 322
- SML 323
- SML 324
- SML 325
- SML 326
- HMS Meda (ex–HDML 1301) (1945–1966)
- HMS Medusa (ex–HDML 1387) (1952–1965)
- HMS Gleaner (1983–2018)

=== Earlier survey vessels ===
- HMS Merlin (1666–1698), the Navy's first hydrographic survey vessel
- HMS Hecate (1839–65)
- HMS Myrmidon (1867–88)
- HMS Triton
- HMS Fantome (1906–14, 1920–24)
- HMS Endeavour (1913–42)
- HMS Melisande (1918–19)
- HMS Challenger (1932–53)
- HMS White Bear (1939–45)
- HMS Vidal (1954–71)
- Hunt class
  - HMS Beaufort (1920–35)
  - HMS Fitzroy (1920–38)
  - HMS Flinders (1920–38)
  - HMS Kellett (1920–38)
- 24 class
  - HMS Iroquois (1923–31)
  - HMS Herald (ex–HMS Merry Hampton) (1924–39)
  - HMS Ormonde (1924–36)
- Bittern class
  - HMS Stork (1936–39)
- Hastings class
  - HMS Folkestone (1938)
  - HMS Scarborough (1938)
- Halcyon class
  - HMS Franklin (1938–52)
  - HMS Gleaner (1938–39)
  - HMS Jason (1938–39)
  - HMS Scott (1939–64)
  - HMS Seagull (1946–50)
  - HMS Sharpshooter (1946–62) – renamed HMS Shackleton, 1955
- Bay class
  - HMS Dampier (1948–68)
  - HMS Owen (1949–65)
  - HMS Cook (1950–64)
  - HMS Dalrymple (1950–66)
