= List of ship launches in 1967 =

The list of ship launches in 1967 includes a chronological list of all ships launched in 1967.

Date	Ship	Class / type	Builder	Location	Country	Notes
27 January	Clandeboye	Tug	Appledore Shipbuilders Ltd.	Appledore	United Kingdom	For J. Cooper (Belfast) Ltd.
27 January	Svenner	Kobben-class submarine	Nordseewerke	Emden	West Germany	For Royal Norwegian Navy
30 January	Pointer	Dog-class tug	Appledore Shipbuilders Ltd.	Appledore	United Kingdom	For Royal Maritime Auxiliary Service.
1 February	G.W.112	Barge	Appledore Shipbuilders Ltd.	Appledore	United Kingdom	For George Wimpey Ltd.
1 February	Tarbatness	combat stores ship	Swan Hunter	Wallsend	United Kingdom	
5 February	Vittorio Veneto	Helicopter cruiser	Italcantieri	Castellammare di Stabia	Italy	
11 February	Mellon	Hamilton-class cutter	Avondale Shipyard	Westwego, Louisiana	United States	
15 February	Dybbøl		Husumer Schiffswerft	Husum	West Germany	For Rederiet I/S Union
17 February	U 1	Type 205 submarine	HDW	Kiel	West Germany	For German Navy
25 February	Renown	Resolution-class submarine	Cammell Laird	Birkenhead	United Kingdom	
25 February	Harushio	Asashio-class submarine			Japan	
27 February	Banco	Tank barge	J. Bolson & Son Ltd.	Poole	United Kingdom	For Beagle Shipping Ltd.
February	McDermott Tidelands No. 09	Barge	Alabama Drydock and Shipbuilding Company	Mobile, Alabama	United States	For J. Ray McDermott Co. Inc.
February	McDermott Tidelands No. 010	Barge	Alabama Drydock and Shipbuilding Company	Mobile, Alabama	United States	For J. Ray McDermott Co. Inc.
1 March	Arni Fridriksson	Fishing trawler	Brooke Marine Ltd.	Lowestoft	United Kingdom	For Icelandic Government.
10 March	Förde	Förde-class	Deutsche Werft AG	Hamburg	West Germany	
25 March	Hepburn	Knox-class frigate	Todd Pacific Shipyards	San Pedro, California	United States	
29 March	Redoutable	Redoutable-class submarine	DCNS	Cherbourg	France	For French Navy
29 March	Sealyham	Dog-class tug	Appledore Shipbuilders Ltd.	Appledore	United Kingdom	For Royal Maritime Auxiliary Service.
8 April	Westensee	Walchensee-class tanker	Lindenau	Kiel	West Germany	For German Navy
12 April	Spaniel	Dog-class tug	Appledore Shipbuilders Ltd.	Appledore	United Kingdom	For Royal Maritime Auxiliary Service.
13 April	Mölders	Lütjens-class destroyer	Bath Iron Works	Bath, Maine	United States	
14 April	Hammerhead	Sturgeon-class submarine	Newport News Shipbuilding	Newport News, Virginia	United States	
15 April	Tautog	Sturgeon-class submarine	Ingalls Shipbuilding	Pascagoula, Mississippi	United States	
22 April	Orage	Landing Ship Dock	DCNS	Brest, France	France	
23 April	Canguro Verde	ferry	Italcantieri S.p.A.	Castellamare di Stabia	Italy	For Traghetti Sardi S.p.A.
25 April	Fjordaas	Bulk carrier	Harland & Wolff	Belfast	United Kingdom	For Norwegian Bulk Carriers.
26 April	Hermione	Leander-class frigate	Yarrow Shipbuilders	Glasgow	United Kingdom	
27 April	Roark	Knox-class frigate	Todd Pacific Shipyards	Seattle, Washington	United States	
April	Barracuda	Daphné-class submarine	Dubigeon	Nantes	France	For Marinha Portuguesa
11 May	Seal	Seal-class patrol boat	Brooke Marine Ltd.	Lowestoft	United Kingdom	For Royal Air Force Marine Branch.
15 May	Lundy Gull	Fishing trawler	Appledore Shipbuilders Ltd.	Appledore	United Kingdom	For Appledore Shipbuilders Ltd.
20 May	Chase	Hamilton-class cutter	Avondale Shipyard	Westwego, Louisiana	United States	
20 May	Gurnard	Sturgeon-class submarine	Mare Island Naval Shipyard	Vallejo, California	United States	
22 May	Constance Banks	Fishing trawler	Appledore Shipbuilders Ltd.	Appledore	United Kingdom	For East Anglian Ice & Cold Storage Co. Ltd.
24 May	Andromeda	Leander-class frigate	HMNB Portsmouth	Portsmouth	United Kingdom	
24 May	Druid Stone	Tank barge	J. Bolson & Son Ltd.	Poole	United Kingdom	For Cory Tank Lighterage Ltd.
24 May	Maplebank	Cargo ship	Harland & Wolff	Belfast	United Kingdom	For Bank Line.
27 May	John F. Kennedy	Modified Kitty Hawk-class aircraft carrier	Newport News Shipbuilding	Newport News, Virginia	United States	
May	McDermott Tidelands No. 07	Barge	Alabama Drydock and Shipbuilding Company	Mobile, Alabama	United States	For J. Ray McDermott Co. Inc.
May	McDermott Tidelands No. 08	Barge	Alabama Drydock and Shipbuilding Company	Mobile, Alabama	United States	For J. Ray McDermott Co. Inc.
3 June	Pogy	Sturgeon-class submarine	New York Shipbuilding	Camden, New Jersey	United States	
5 June	U 10	Type 205 submarine	HDW	Kiel	West Germany	For German Navy
10 June	Alpino	Alpino-class frigate	Cantieri Navali Riuniti (CNR)	Riva Trigoso	Italy	
22 June	Grayling	Sturgeon-class submarine	Portsmouth Naval Shipyard	Kittery, Maine	United States	
22 June	Suffolk Venturer	Fishing trawler	Appledore Shipbuilders Ltd.	Appledore	United Kingdom	For Small & Co (Lowestoft) Ltd.
28 June	Psyché	Daphné-class submarine	Direction des Constructions et Armes Navales	Brest	France	For French Navy
28 June	Sirène	Daphné-class submarine	Direction des Constructions et Armes Navales	Brest	France	For French Navy
12 July	Bulldog	Bulldog-class survey vessel	Brooke Marine Ltd.	Lowestoft	United Kingdom	For Royal Navy.
15 July	Meyerkord	Knox-class frigate	Todd Pacific Shipyards	San Pedro, California	United States	
15 July	Polar Ecuador	Polar-Ecuador-class reefer ship	Blohm + Voss	Hamburg	West Germany	For Hamburg Süd
19 July	Jade	Förde-class	Deutsche Werft AG	Hamburg	West Germany	
25 July	Poilo	Tanker	Appledore Shipbuilders Ltd.	Appledore	United Kingdom	For Shell-Mex & B.P. Ltd.
29 July	Makigumo	Yamagumo-class destroyer			Japan	
5 August	Canguro Bianco	Ferry	Italcantieri S.p.A.	Castellamare di Stabia	Italy	For Traghetti Sardi S.p.A.
9 August	Butte	Kilauea-class ammunition ship	General Dynamics Quincy Shipbuilding	Quincy, Massachusetts	United States	
9 August	Kilauea	Kilauea-class ammunition ship	General Dynamics Quincy Shipbuilding	Quincy, Massachusetts	United States	
11 August	Lütjens	Lütjens-class destroyer	Bath Iron Works	Bath, Maine	United States	
16 August	Advance	Attack-class patrol boat	Walkers Limited	Maryborough	Australia	
26 August	Acute	Attack-class patrol boat			Australia	
4 September	Jupiter	Leander-class frigate	Yarrow Shipbuilders	Glasgow	United Kingdom	
6 September	Myrina	Supertanker	Harland & Wolff	Belfast	United Kingdom	For Deutsche Shell AG.
7 September	Beagle	Bulldog-class survey vessel	Brooke Marine Ltd.	Lowestoft	United Kingdom	For Royal Navy.
7 September	L. Y. Spear	L. Y. Spear-class submarine tender	General Dynamics Quincy Shipbuilding	Quincy, Massachusetts	United States	
9 September	Narwhal	Unique nuclear-powered submarine	Electric Boat	Groton, Connecticut	United States	
9 September	Polar Argentina	Polar-Ecuador-class reefer ship	Blohm + Voss	Hamburg	West Germany	For Hamburg Süd
20 September	Queen Elizabeth 2	Ocean liner	Upper Clyde Shipbuilders	Clydebank	United Kingdom	For Cunard Line
30 September	Carabiniere	Alpino-class frigate	Cantieri Navali Riuniti (CNR)	Riva Trigoso	Italy	
5 October	Sea Devil	Sturgeon-class submarine	Newport News Shipbuilding	Newport News, Virginia	United States	
7 October	Nashville	Austin-class amphibious transport dock	Lockheed Shipbuilding	Seattle, Washington	United States	
7 October	Aware	Attack-class patrol boat			Australia	
14 October	Polar Colombia	Polar-Ecuador-class reefer ship	Blohm + Voss	Hamburg	West Germany	For Hamburg Süd
19 October	Antrim	County-class destroyer	Upper Clyde Shipbuilders	Clydebank	United Kingdom	
30 October	Perso	Tanker	Appledore Shipbuilders Ltd.	Appledore	United Kingdom	For Shell-Mex & B.P. Ltd.
31 October	Pando	Tanker	Appledore Shipbuilders Ltd.	Appledore	United Kingdom	For Shell-Mex & B.P. Ltd.
3 November	Gray	Knox-class frigate	Todd Pacific Shipyards	Seattle, Washington	United States	
4 November	Repulse	Resolution-class submarine	Vickers	Barrow-in-Furness	United Kingdom	
6 November	Fox	Bulldog-class survey vessel	Brooke Marine Ltd.	Lowestoft	United Kingdom	For Royal Navy.
16 November	Norfolk	County-class destroyer	Swan Hunter	Wallsend	United Kingdom	
16 November	Suffolk Endeavour	Fishing trawler	Appledore Shipbuilders Ltd.	Appledore	United Kingdom	For Small & Co (Lowestoft) Ltd.
18 November	Assail	Attack-class patrol boat			Australia	
20 November	Benstac	Cargo ship	Govan Shipbuilders Ltd.	Glasgow	United Kingdom	For Ben Line.
21 November	Essi Kristine	Bulk carrier	Harland & Wolff	Belfast	United Kingdom	For Norwegian Bulk Carriers.
25 November	Polar Brasil	Polar-Ecuador-class reefer ship	Blohm + Voss	Hamburg	West Germany	For Hamburg Süd
29 November	Aspro	Sturgeon-class submarine	Ingalls Shipbuilding	Pascagoula, Mississippi	United States	
1 December	Gowanbank	Cargo ship	Harland & Wolff	Belfast	United Kingdom	For Bank Line.
2 December	Charleston	Charleston-class amphibious cargo ship	Newport News Shipbuilding	Newport News, Virginia	United States	
2 December	Archer	Attack-class patrol boat			Australia	
4 December	Ovens	Oberon-class submarine		Greenock	United Kingdom	For Royal Australian Navy
4 December	P.A.S. 1503	Tank barge	Appledore Shipbuilders Ltd.	Appledore	United Kingdom	For Royal Maritime Auxiliary Service.
5 December	Michishio	Asashio-class submarine			Japan	
16 December	Swan	River-class destroyer escort	Williamstown Naval Dockyard	Williamstown, Victoria	Australia	
16 December	Minegumo	Minegumo-class destroyer			Japan	
29 December	P.A.S. 1504	Tank barge	Appledore Shipbuilders Ltd.	Appledore	United Kingdom	For Royal Maritime Auxiliary Service.
Unknown date	Carsten	Coaster	J J Sietas		West Germany	
Unknown date	Into	Salvage tug	Laivateollisuus	Turku	Finland	
Unknown date	Sir John Cass	Research vessel	J. Bolson & Son Ltd.	Poole	United Kingdom	For Greater London Council.
