= United Kingdom Hydrographic Office =

UK government agency concerned with providing hydrographic and marine geospatial data

Agency overview
- Formed: 2001
- Headquarters: Admiralty Way Taunton TA1 2DN
- Employees: approx 900
- Minister responsible: Vernon Coaker, Minister of State for Defence
- Agency executive: Vanessa Blake, Chief Executive
- Parent agency: Ministry of Defence
- Website: gov.uk/ukho

The United Kingdom Hydrographic Office (UKHO) is the UK's agency for providing hydrographic and marine geospatial data to mariners and maritime organisations across the world. The UKHO is a trading fund of the Ministry of Defence (MoD) and is located in Taunton, Somerset, with a workforce of approximately 900 staff.

The UKHO is responsible for operational support to the Royal Navy and other defence customers. Supplying defence and the commercial shipping industry, they help ensure Safety of Life at Sea (SOLAS), protect the marine environment and support the efficiency of global trade.

The UKHO also produces Admiralty charts, providing SOLAS-compliant charts, publications and digital services for ships trading internationally.

== History ==
=== Establishment and early operation ===
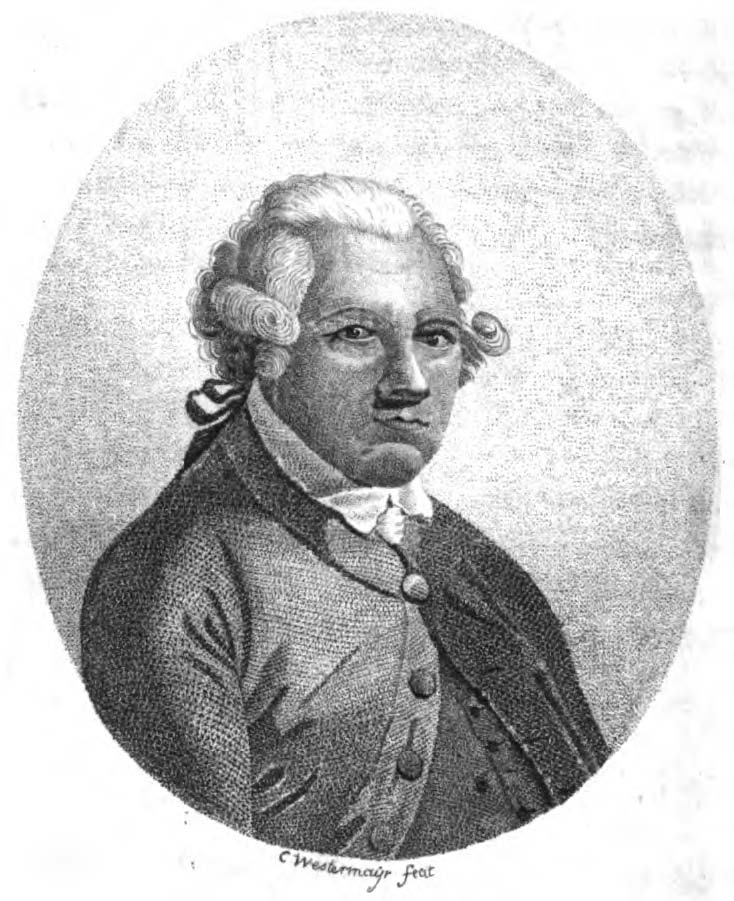
Alexander Dalrymple, engraving by Conrad Westermayr

The Admiralty's first Hydrographer was Alexander Dalrymple, appointed in 1795 on the order of King George III. The existing charts were brought together and catalogued. The first chart Dalrymple published as Hydrographer to the Admiralty (of Quiberon Bay in Brittany) did not appear until 1800. He also issued Sailing Directions and Notices to Mariners (NMs).

Dalrymple was succeeded on his death in 1808 by Captain Thomas Hurd, under whose stewardship the department was given permission to sell charts to the public in 1821.

In 1819, Captain Hurd entered into a bilateral agreement with Denmark to exchange charts and publications covering areas of mutual interest. This is thought to be the earliest formal arrangement for the mutual supply of information between the British and any foreign Hydrographic Office. Hurd developed the specialism of Royal Navy hydrographic surveyors. Rear-Admiral Sir W. Edward Parry was appointed Hydrographer in 1823 after his second expedition to discover a Northwest Passage. In 1825 some 736 charts and coastal views were being offered for sale by the Hydrographic Office.

=== Explorations ===
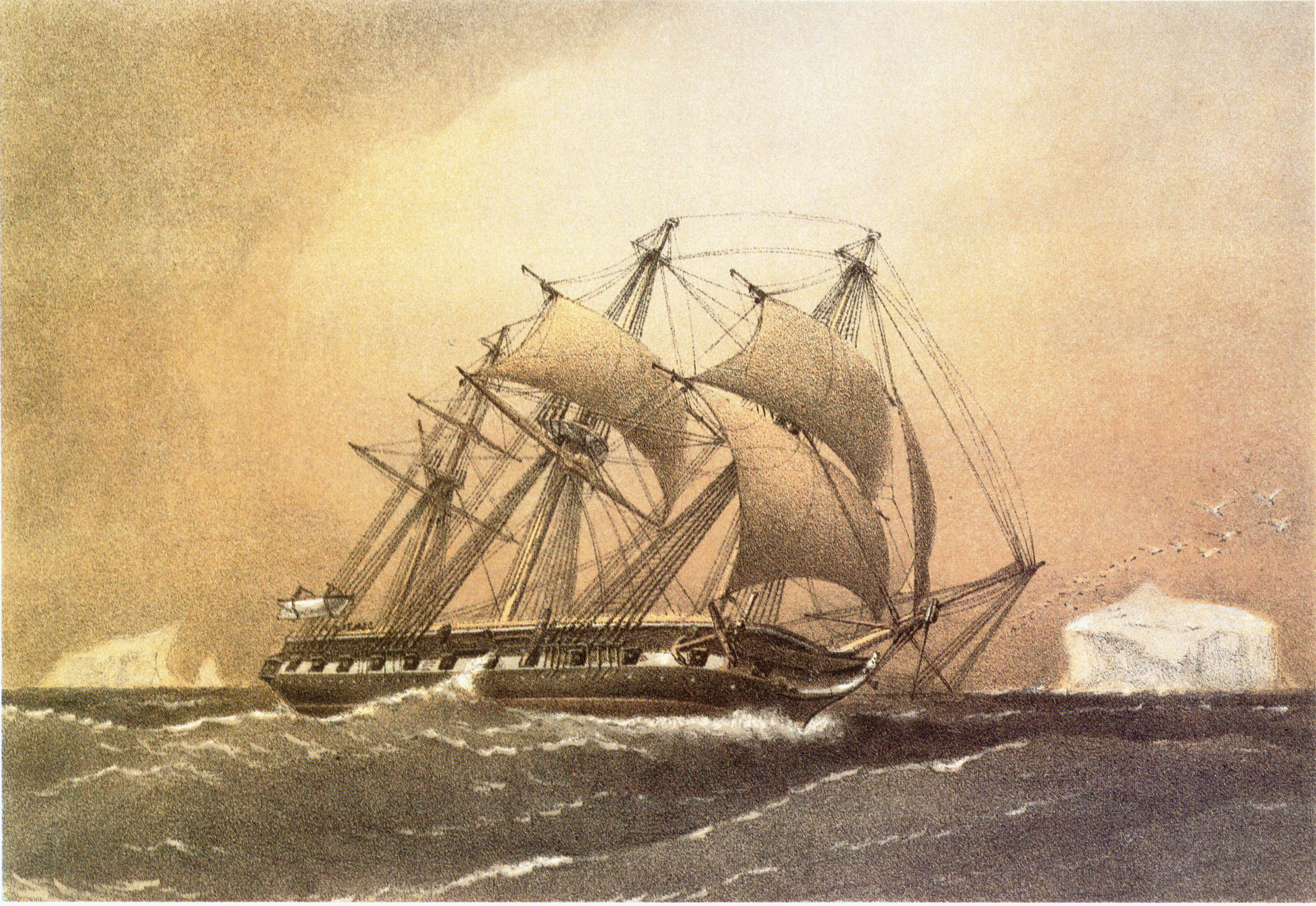
HMS Challenger by William Frederick Mitchell

In 1828 Captain Parry and the Royal Society organised a scientific voyage to the South Atlantic, in collaboration with the Hydrographers of France and Spain, using HMS Chanticleer.

In 1829, at the age of 55, Rear-Admiral Sir Francis Beaufort became Hydrographer. During his time as Hydrographer, he developed the eponymous Scale, saw the introduction of official tide tables in 1833 and instigated various surveys and expeditions. Several of these were by HMS Beagle, including one to Tierra del Fuego and Patagonia in 1826. In 1831 Captain Beaufort informed Captain FitzRoy that he had found a savant for the latter's surveying voyage to South America, Charles Darwin. After completing extensive surveys in South America he returned to Falmouth, Cornwall via New Zealand and Australia in 1836. By the time of Beaufort's retirement in 1855, the Chart Catalogue listed 1,981 charts and 64,000 copies of them had been issued to the Royal Navy.

In the 1870s, the Royal Naval Surveying Service supported the Challenger expedition, a scientific exercise that made many discoveries, laying the foundation of oceanography. The cruise was named after the mother vessel, HMS Challenger. On her 68,890-nautical-mile (127,580 km) circumnavigation of the globe, 492 deep sea soundings, 133 bottom dredges, 151 open water trawls and 263 serial water temperature observations were taken. The Challenger crew used a method of observation developed in earlier small-scale expeditions. To measure depth, the crew would lower a line with a weight attached to it until it reached the sea floor. The line was marked in 25-fathom intervals, with flags denoting depth. Because of this, the depth measurements from the Challenger were at best accurate to 25 fathoms (150 feet), or about 46 metres. As the first true oceanographic cruise, the Challenger expedition established an entire academic and research discipline.

During the late 19th century, the UKHO took part in several international conferences, including the International Meridian Conference to determine a prime meridian for international use and other conferences working towards the establishment of a permanent international commission concerning hydrographic matters. Hydrographers to the Admiralty Board during this period included: Rear-Admiral John Washington, Rear-Admiral George Henry Richards, Captain Sir Frederick J. O. Evans and Rear-Admiral Sir William J. L. Wharton.

=== 20th century ===
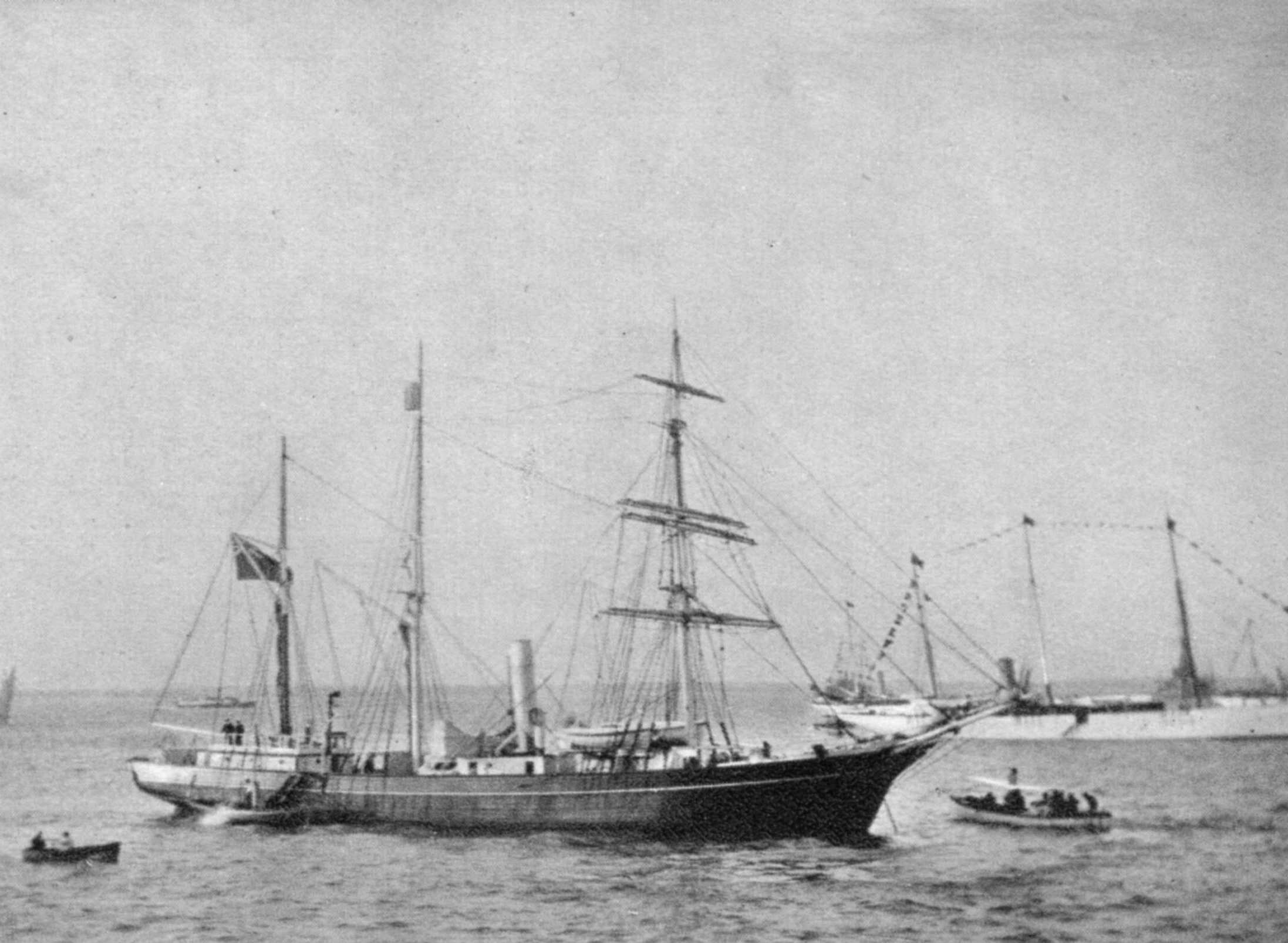
The expedition's ship Nimrod departing for the South Pole

During Rear-Admiral A. Mostyn Field's term as Hydrographer to the Admiralty Board, the Hydrographic Office lent instruments to the Nimrod Expedition of the British Antarctic Expedition led by Ernest Shackleton in 1907. Following the sinking of the RMS Titanic in 1912, the Safety of Life at Sea (SOLAS) convention was established, and ice reporting and forecasting were introduced. During World War I, while Rear-Admiral Sir John F. Parry was Hydrographer of the Navy, the Hydrographic Office produced numerous new charts and products to support the Royal Navy.

Following the war, the First International Hydrographic Conference was held in London. It led to the establishment in 1921 of the International Hydrographic Organization. In the 1930s, the systematic and regular collection of oceanographic and naval meteorological data started. In the Second World War, while led by Vice-Admiral Sir John A. Edgell, chart printing moved to Creechbarrow House in Taunton in June 1941. This was the first purpose-built chart making factory, and was designed by the Chief Draughtsman, Mr Jowsey. In 1968, compilation staff were transferred from Cricklewood, London to Taunton, thus bringing together the main elements of the Hydrographic Office. A purpose-built office, named after Alexander Dalrymple, was opened. Charts were metricated and computerised in the later 1960s and early 1970s under the leadership of Rear-Admiral Sir Edmund G. Irving (1960–1966), Rear-Admiral George Stephen Ritchie (1966–1971), Rear-Admiral Geoffrey P. D. Hall (1971–1975) and Rear-Admiral Sir David W. Haslam (1975–1985).

For centuries, data had mainly been collected using ordinary Royal Navy ships. In 1953, the first purpose-built survey vessel was launched: HMS Vidal. With the use of the echo sounder and other electronic equipment in the 20th century, there was a big increase in the quantity and quality of the data collected. The technology used to collect data also improved with the first commercial use of multibeam survey technology in 1977; HMS Bulldog undertook the first side-scan sonar of Mount's Bay, Cornwall, in 1987. The work has since been continued by the Bulldog-class survey vessels which form the "Hydrographic Squadron".

In 1994, the Hydrographer of the Navy also became the Chief Executive of UKHO. The post was held by Rear-Admiral Nigel R. Essenhigh (1994–1996) and Rear-Admiral John P. Clarke (1996–2001).

== Publications ==
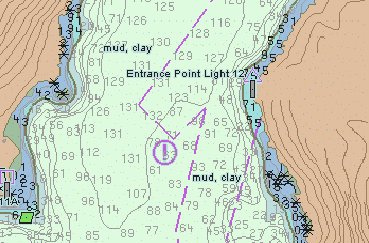
An example of an Electronic Navigational Chart (NOAA)

The UKHO continues to serve the Royal Navy as its prime customer by supplying hydrographic and geospatial data. The UKHO's products and services are sold to merchant mariners and leisure users through its commercial branch.

In addition to traditional paper nautical charts and publications, the range has expanded to include a number of digital products and services. In 1996, the UKHO developed ADMIRALTY Raster Chart Service, a raster navigational chart service for Electronic Chart Display and Information System. This was followed in 2008 by ADMIRALTY Vector Chart Service, offering 15,750 fully vectorised Electronic Navigational Charts (ENCs).

The UKHO produces over 200 nautical publications, which are available as e-Nautical Publications or in the Digital Publications suite. Notable publications include Sailing directions (Pilots), Tide tables, List of Radio Signals, List of Lights and Fog Signals and the Mariner's Handbook. The UKHO also offers astronomical publications from HM Nautical Almanac Office, including The Nautical Almanac and The Astronomical Almanac, among others.

Today, the UKHO has expertise in areas such as bathymetry, oceanography, geodesy and data science. It provides advice on technical aspects of Law of the Sea, specialising in maritime limits and boundaries. It also delivers a range of cartographic and ENC training programmes internationally to develop the core skills of marine cartography. Since 2015, the UKHO has supported the delivery of the Commonwealth Marine Economies (CME) Programme in partnership Cefas and NOC, a programme enabling Small Island Developing States (SIDS) to sustainably develop their marine economies.

=== Admiralty List of Lights and Fog Signals ===
The UKHO publishes the Admiralty List of Lights and Fog Signals covering the whole world in 12 volumes. The information is also available in digital form.

=== Access to data ===
The UKHO is the government department responsible for charting the seas. It is part of the Ministry of Defence, and operates as a trading fund, enabling it to be self-funding through sale of products and licensing of data. The UKHO sources much of its information from foreign governments to whom it pays royalty fees, funded by the profits it makes.

The UKHO grants six different licences, according to the use of the product. Whilst it generally allows use for non-navigational, non-commercial or low value purposes free of charge (over 80% of licences), where licensing is for use in a commercial product, a licence fee is charged. The UKHO is committed to the Information Fair Traders Scheme and makes available for reuse those data that are collected as part of its Public Task, which do not include third party Intellectual Property Rights.

The Information Fair Trader Scheme Report on the UKHO in April 2011 states that the UKHO data will not be included in the Public Data Corporation to make government owned data more freely available, but it recommends that the "UKHO should consider the introduction of a Free Navigational Licence" for non-commercial or low value use, consistent with its treatment of non-navigational use.

== List of chief executives ==
- 2001–2006: Wyn Williams
- 2006–2011: Mike Robinson
- 2011–2015: Rear Admiral Ian Moncrieff
- 2015–2019: John Humphrey
- 2019–2020: Rear Admiral Tim Lowe
- 2020–2024: Rear Admiral Peter Sparkes (acting from 2020–2021)
- 2024–Present: Vanessa Blake

== See also ==
- Admiralty chart
- Australian Pilot
- Geospatial Commission
- Hydrographic office
