= Japanese ship Asashio =

Four naval vessels of Japan have been named Asashio:

- Japanese destroyer Asashio (1902), a Shirakumo-class destroyer of the Imperial Japanese Navy during the Russo-Japanese War and World War I
- Japanese destroyer Asashio (1936), lead ship of the 1936 Asashio class
- JDS Asashio (SS-562), lead ship of the 1965 Asashio class
- JDS Asashio (SS-589), a Harushio-class submarine of the Japanese Maritime Self-Defense Force in 1995

== See also ==
- Asashio-class destroyer, a class of ten destroyers of the Imperial Japanese Navy during World War II
- Asashio-class submarine, a class of four submarines of the Japanese Maritime Self-Defense Force in 1965
