= Japanese ship Michishio =

At least three warships of Japan have been named Michishio:

- Japanese destroyer Michishio, an Asashio-class destroyer launched in 1937 and sunk in 1944.
- JDS Michishio (SS-564), an Asashio-class submarine launched in 1967 and stricken in 1985.
- JS Michishio, an Oyashio-class submarine launched in 1997.
