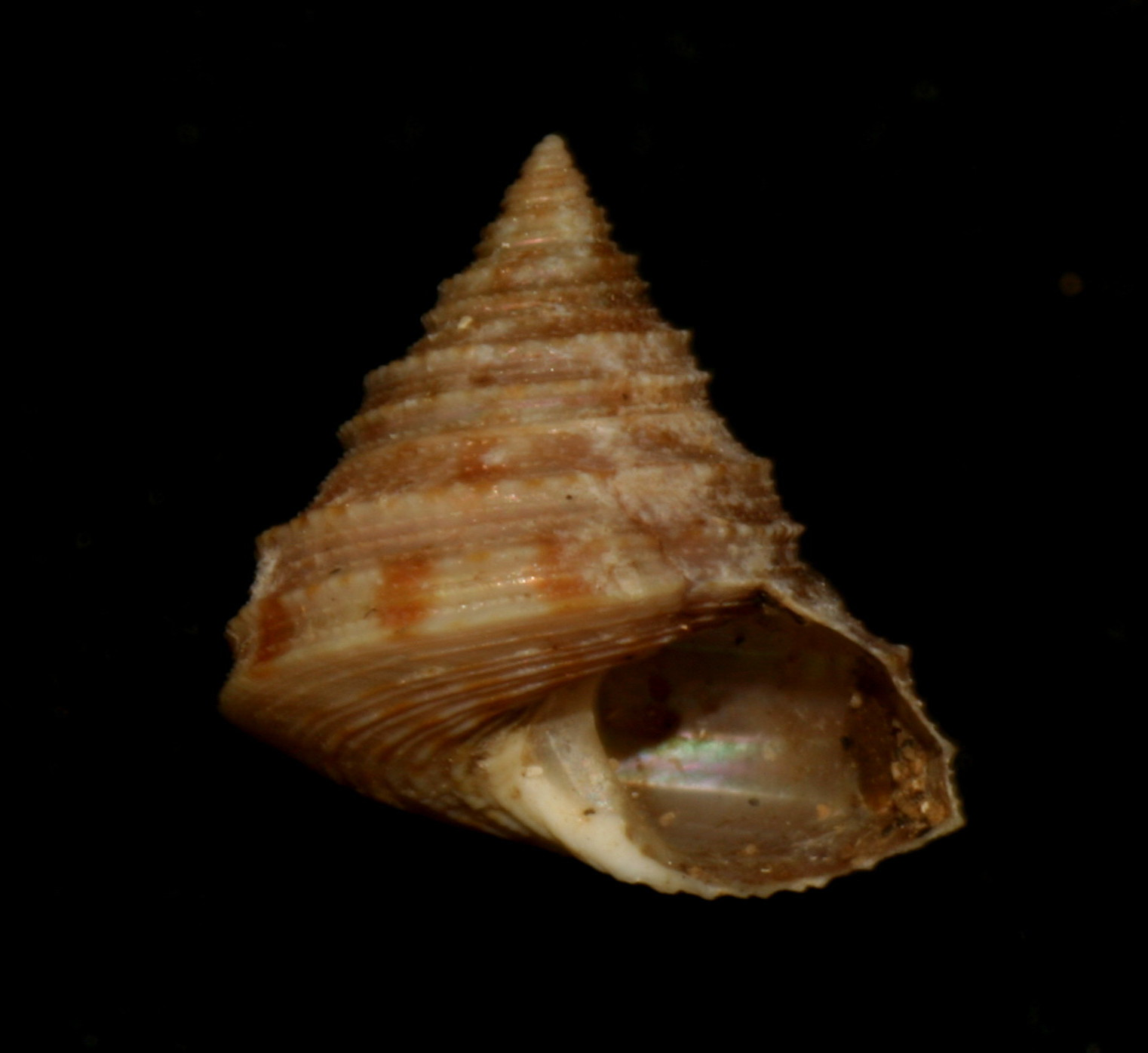
- Apertural view of Shell of Calliostoma shinagawaense (Tokunaga, 1906) from Enshū Nada, Japan

Scientific classification
- Kingdom: Animalia
- Phylum: Mollusca
- Class: Gastropoda
- Subclass: Vetigastropoda
- Order: Trochida
- Family: Calliostomatidae
- Genus: Calliostoma
- Species: C. shinagawaense

Binomial name
- Calliostoma shinagawaense (Tokunaga, 1906)

Synonyms
- Tristichotrochus shingawensis (Tokunaga, 1906) superseded combination; Trochus (Calliostoma) shinagawensis Tokunaga, 1906 superseded combination; Trochus shinagawaensis Tokunaga, 1906

= Calliostoma shinagawaense =

Species of gastropod

Calliostoma shinagawaense is a species of sea snail, a marine gastropod mollusk in the family Calliostomatidae.

Some authors place this taxon in the subgenus Calliostoma (Tristichotrochus).

Subspecies

- Calliostoma shinagawense cipangoanum Yokoyama, 1920
- Calliostoma shinagawense shinagawense (Tokunaga, 1906)

== Description ==
The height of the shell varies between 12 mm and 40 mm. The sides of the shell are flat, giving it a triangular profile. The whorls are heavily sculptured with strongly beaded spiral cords along the periphery and the subsutural region with weakly beaded spiral cords in between. The umbilicus is closed. The aperture (opening) is nacreous (pearly). The base is almost flat and is sculpted with numerous minutely granulated spiral cords. The color is yellowish brown with reddish brown maculations.

== Distribution ==
This species occurs from Kyushu to Honshu, Japan across to the Bōsō Peninsula on sand and gravel bottoms at depths of 5 to 50 m. It also occurs in the East China Sea and off Taiwan.
