= Echo-class survey ship =

There are two classes of survey ships of the British Royal Navy known as the Echo-class:

- Echo-class survey ship (1957)
- Echo-class survey ship (2002)
