= Japanese destroyer Natsugumo =

At least two warships of Japan have been named Natsugumo:

- Japanese destroyer Natsugumo (1937), an Asashio-class destroyer launched in 1937 and sunk in 1942
- JDS Natsugumo, a Minegumo-class destroyer launched in 1968 and struck in 1999.
