= Japanese ship Ōshio =

At least two warships of Japan have been named Ōshio:

- Japanese destroyer Ōshio, an Asashio-class destroyer launched in 1937 and sunk in 1943.
- JDS Ōshio, a submarine launched in 1964 and struck in 1981.
