= JDS Natsugumo =

Minegumo-class destroyer

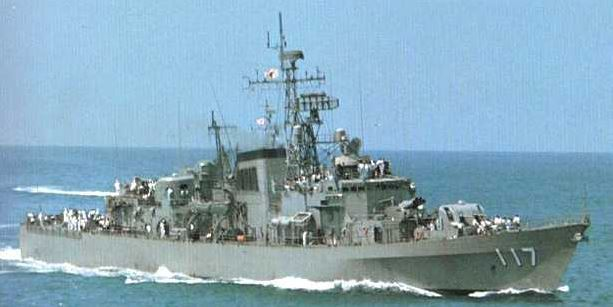
- JDS Natsugumo

History

Japan
- Name: Natsugumo; (なつぐも)
- Namesake: Natsugumo (1937)
- Ordered: 1966
- Builder: Uraga, Uraga
- Laid down: 26 June 1967
- Launched: 25 July 1968
- Commissioned: 25 April 1969
- Decommissioned: 18 March 1999
- Reclassified: TV-3510
- Home port: Kure
- Identification: Pennant number: DD-117
- Fate: Scrapped

General characteristics
- Class & type: Minegumo-class destroyer
- Displacement: 2,100 long tons (2,134 t) standard; 2,750 long tons (2,794 t) full load
- Length: 115 m (377 ft 4 in)
- Beam: 11.8 m (38 ft 9 in)
- Draft: 3.8 m (12 ft 6 in)
- Complement: 210
- Sensors & processing systems: OPS-11B EWR; OPS-17 surface search radar; OQS-3 hull-sonar; SQS-35 variable depth sonar
- Electronic warfare & decoys: NOLR-1B electronic warfare suite
- Armament: 2 × Mk.33 twin 3"/50 caliber guns; 1 × Bofors 375 mm (15 in) ASW rocket launcher; 2 × HOS-301 triple 324 mm (12.8 in) torpedo tubes
- Aircraft carried: 2 × QH-50D DASH anti-submarine drone helicopter (removed in 1979-82 and ASROC fitted)

JDS Natsugumo (DD-117) was the second ship of Minegumo-class destroyers.

== Construction and career ==
Natsugumo was laid down at Uraga Dock Company Uraga Shipyard on 26 June 1967 and launched on 25 July 1968. She was commissioned on 25 April 1969.

The ship was equipped with a domestically produced Type 72 fire control system type 1B on a trial basis.

At around 9:30 pm on 31 March 1978, she came into contact with the submarine JDS Asashio while training at Enshu Nada, about 120 km south of Omaezaki, Shizuoka Prefecture. The periscope of Asashio and the right screw of Natsugumo were partially damaged. At that time, anti-submarine attack training aimed at Asashio was underway in this water area, and Asashio came into contact with Natsugumo at a periscope depth of about 16 meters.

A special renovation work was carried out between 15 December 1981 and 15 June 1982, and the DASH QH-50D on the rear deck was removed and equipped with an ASROC launcher.

On 27 March 1982, the 22nd Escort Corps was reorganized into the 2nd Escort Corps.

In 1984, participated in a practicing voyage to the ocean.

On 19 March 1986, the 22nd Escort Corps was reorganized under the Kure District Force.

On 1 August 1995, the type was changed to a training ship, and the ship registration number was changed to TV-3510. Transferred to Training Squadron 1st Training Squadron.

Removed from the register on 18 March 1999. The total distance was 670,610.4 nautical miles.
