= JDS Asashio (SS-562) =

Asashio-class submarines

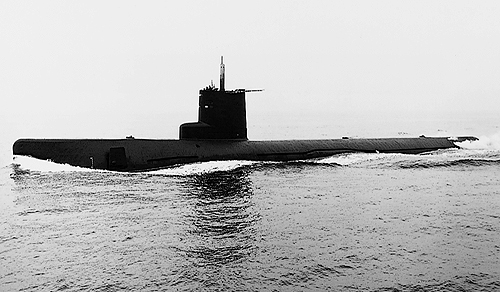
- JDS Asashio

History

Japan
- Name: Asashio; (あさしお)
- Namesake: Asashio (1936)
- Ordered: 1963
- Builder: Kawasaki, Kobe
- Laid down: 15 October 1964
- Launched: 27 November 1965
- Commissioned: 13 October 1966
- Decommissioned: 30 March 1983
- Home port: Kure
- Identification: Pennant number: SS-562
- Fate: Scrapped, July 1984

General characteristics
- Class & type: Asashio-class submarine
- Displacement: 1,650 long tons (1,676 t) surfaced; 2,250 long tons (2,286 t) submerged
- Length: 88 m (288 ft 9 in)
- Beam: 8.2 m (26 ft 11 in)
- Draft: 4.9 m (16 ft 1 in)
- Depth: 7.5 m (24 ft 7 in)
- Propulsion: Diesel-electric, 2 shafts; 2,900 bhp (2,200 kW) (surfaced); 6,300 shp (4,700 kW) (submerged)
- Speed: 14 knots (26 km/h; 16 mph) surfaced; 18 knots (33 km/h; 21 mph) submerged
- Complement: 80
- Armament: 8 × 533 mm (21 in) torpedo tubes (6 × bow-tube, 2 × stern-tube)

JDS Asashio (SS-562) was the lead boat of the Asashio-class submarines. She was commissioned on 13 October 1966.

== Construction and career ==
Asashio was laid down at Kawasaki Heavy Industries Kobe Shipyard on 15 October 1964 and launched on 27 November 1965. She was commissioned on 13 October 1966, into the 2nd Submarine Group of the 1st Submarine Group.

On 11 August 1967, a portion of Asashio's hull made contact with the seabed while training in the Tsushima area, damaging part of her sonar.

On 16 March 1968, she was transferred to the 3rd Submarine under the 1st Submarine Group, and she was incorporated with Harushio. Asashio participated in Hawaii dispatch training from July 20 to October 8 of the same year.

On 16 October 1973, the 3rd Submarine was reorganized into the 2nd Submarine Group, which was newly formed under the Self-Defense Fleet.

At around 9:30 pm on 31 March 1978, Asashio collided with Natsugumo while training at Enshu-nada, about 120 km south of Omaezaki, Shizuoka Prefecture. Asashio's periscope and Natsugumo's right shaft were partially damaged. At that time, anti-submarine attack training aimed at Asashio was underway in this water area, and she came into contact with Natsugumo at a periscope depth of about 16 meters.

Asashio was decommissioned on 30 March 1983. She had 2,330 dives, 21,674 hours and 14 minutes underwater, 8,066 hours and 58 minutes surfaced, and a total nautical mile of 201,243.4 nautical miles.
