= HMS Woodlark =

Several Royal Navy ships have been named HMS Woodlark or the woodlark:

- HMS Woodlark (1805) was launched at Leith and was wrecked that same year near Calais.
- HMS Woodlark (1808) was a Cherokee-class brig-sloop launched by William Rowe, St Peter's, Newcastle. She was sold into mercantile service in 1818. She became a whaler, sailing out of Port Jackson and was still sailing into the late 1850s.
- HMS Woodlark (1821) was a Quail-class schooner launched at Deptford and sold in 1863
- HMS Woodlark (1871) was a Plover-class wooden screw gunvessel which served from 1871 to 1887.
- HMS Woodlark (1897) was a Woodcock-class river gunboat assembled at Shanghai that served on the Yangtze River from 1897 to 1928.
- HMS Yaxham (M2780), renamed HMS Woodlark as survey vessel in 1964, was a Ham-class minesweeper.
