= HMS Fawn (A325) =

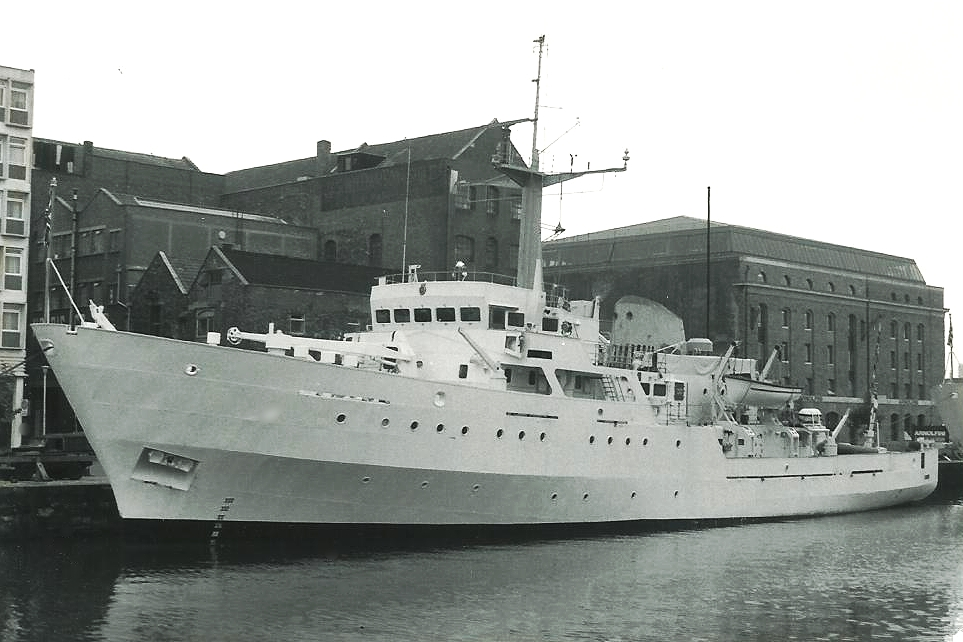

History

United Kingdom
- Name: HMS Fawn
- Builder: Brooke Marine, Lowestoft, England
- Launched: 29 February 1968
- Commissioned: October 1968
- Decommissioned: 1991
- Identification: IMO number: 8843317
- Fate: Sold for use in commercial surveying 1992. Renamed Red Fulmar

General characteristics
- Displacement: 1,160 long tons (1,179 t) full
- Length: 57.7 m (189 ft 4 in)
- Beam: 13 m (42 ft 8 in)
- Propulsion: 4 × Lister Blackstone ER58M 8-cylinder diesel engines, 2,640 bhp (1,969 kW), twin screws
- Speed: 15 knots (28 km/h; 17 mph)
- Complement: 44

HMS Fawn, pennant number A325, was a Bulldog-class hydrographic survey ship of the British Royal Navy. On 20 November 1988 she was involved in an incident with a Guatemalan gunboat in Guatemalan waters while HMS Fawn was carrying out peaceful and legitimate hydrographic survey work in the high seas in the Gulf of Honduras. A protest was made to the Guatemalan Government. Fawn was paid off in October 1991 and sold to interests in West Germany to become an offshore support vessel of the West African and Chinese coasts under the name Red Fulmar.
