= Echo-class survey ship (1957) =

1957 class of British inshore survey craft

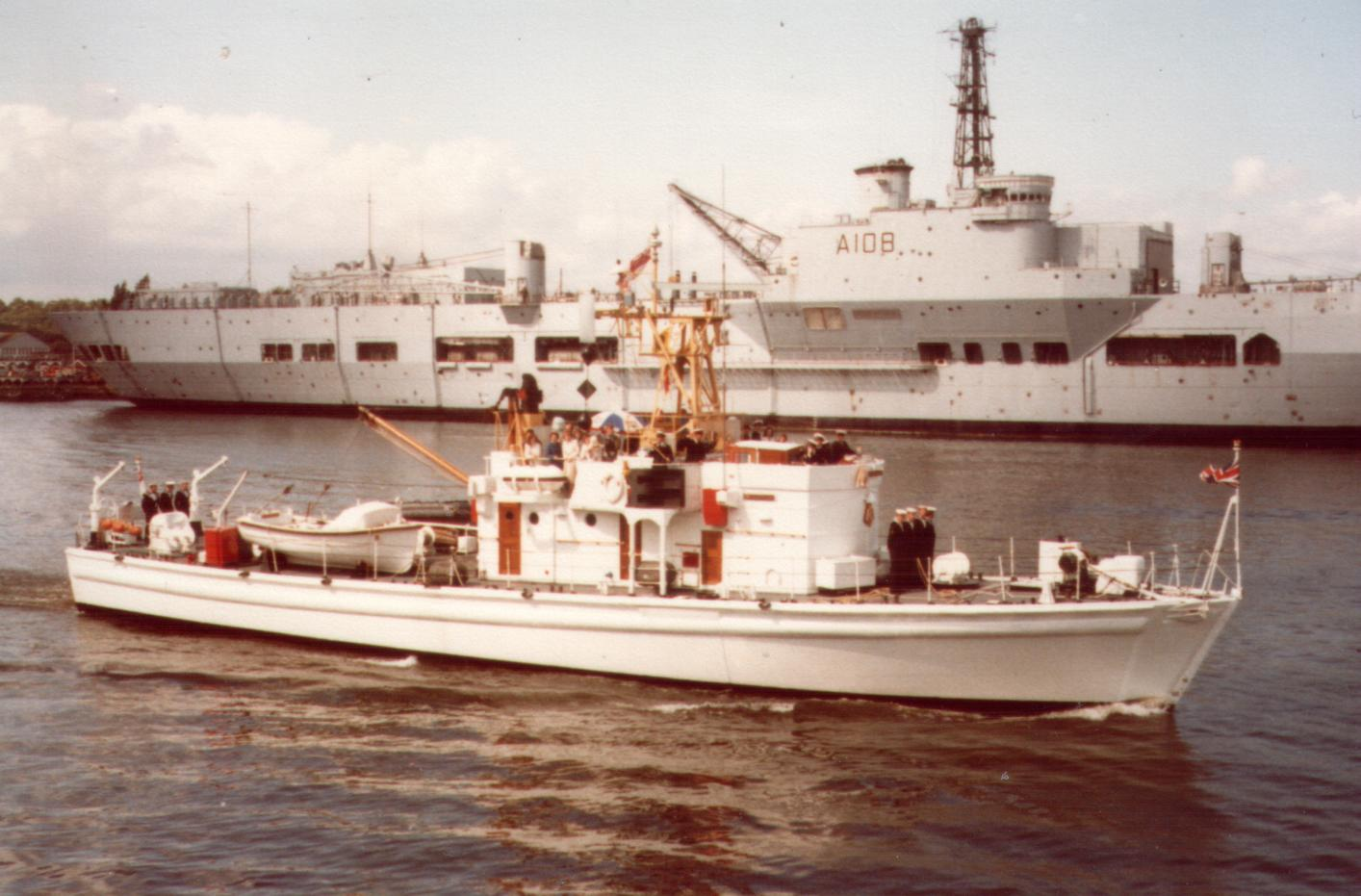
- HMS Enterprise at Chatham in 1981

Class overview
- Name: Echo class
- Operators: Royal Navy
- Built: 1958–1959
- In commission: 1958–1985
- Completed: 3
- Preserved: 1

General characteristics
- Type: Survey ship
- Displacement: 120 long tons (122 t) standard; 160 long tons (163 t) full
- Length: 100 ft (30 m) p/p; 106 ft (32 m) o/a
- Beam: 22 ft (6.7 m)
- Draught: 6 ft 9 in (2.06 m)
- Propulsion: Paxman diesel engines, 1,400 bhp (1,044 kW), 2 shafts, 15 tons diesel fuel
- Speed: 14 knots (26 km/h; 16 mph)
- Range: 4,500 nmi (8,300 km) at 12 kn (22 km/h; 14 mph)
- Complement: 5 officers, 34 ratings (with accommodation for 4 / 18)
- Armament: Fitted for 40 mm/60 Bofors gun

The Echo class was a class of inshore survey vessels built for the British Royal Navy in 1958–1959. The class was designed to operate in close waters such as harbour approaches, shipping lanes, rivers and estuaries. Together, the ships of this class formed the Royal Navy's Inshore Survey Squadron.

== Description ==
The class consisted of three ships, and were of composite (wood on metal frames) construction. They were based on the same basic hull as the Ham-class minesweeper and the Ley-class minehunter. They had a large superstructure with an open bridge on top. The engines were up-rated to 1,400 brake horsepower (1,000 kW). They were crewed by 5 officers and 34 ratings, with accommodation on board for 4 officers and 18 rates.

== Service history ==
In the late 1960s, two Ham-class minesweepers, HMS Powderham and HMS Yaxham were rebuilt as inshore survey vessels very similar to the Echos, although they could be identified by having an enclosed wheelhouse and a tripod mast. They were renamed HMS Waterwitch and Woodlark, respectively.

All ships were sold out of service in 1985. The Marine Society acquired two of the three vessels circa 1985 and converted them to training vessels. They were modified, from plans loaned by the Port of London Authority who had already purchased HMS Polsham in 1967 and converted her to a survey vessel, Maplin. The two vessels were renamed, Jonas Hanway and Earl of Romney, and were initially based and operated in conjunction with the Gravesend Sea School on the Thames at Denton. The third vessel is thought to have been included within the disposal package by the Ministry of Defence and acted as a spare parts source for the two operational vessels. Jonas Hanway was sold to a private owner in 1998 and As of 2021 is moored near Southend-on-Sea.

== Ships ==
- HMS Echo (A70), built by J Samuel White, Cowes, commissioned 12 September 1958, sold 1985 (scrapped for spares)
- HMS Enterprise (A71), built by WM Blackmore & Sons, Bideford, commissioned 1959, sold 1985 (renamed Earl of Romney)
- HMS Egeria (A72), built by William Weatherhead & Sons, Cockenzie, commissioned 1959, sold 1985 (renamed Jonas Hanway)

== See also ==
- Echo class, the Royal Navy's latest survey vessels, launched in 2002.
