= Cape Daiō =

Cape in Japan

Cape Daiō 大王崎 (Daiō-zaki)
- Cape
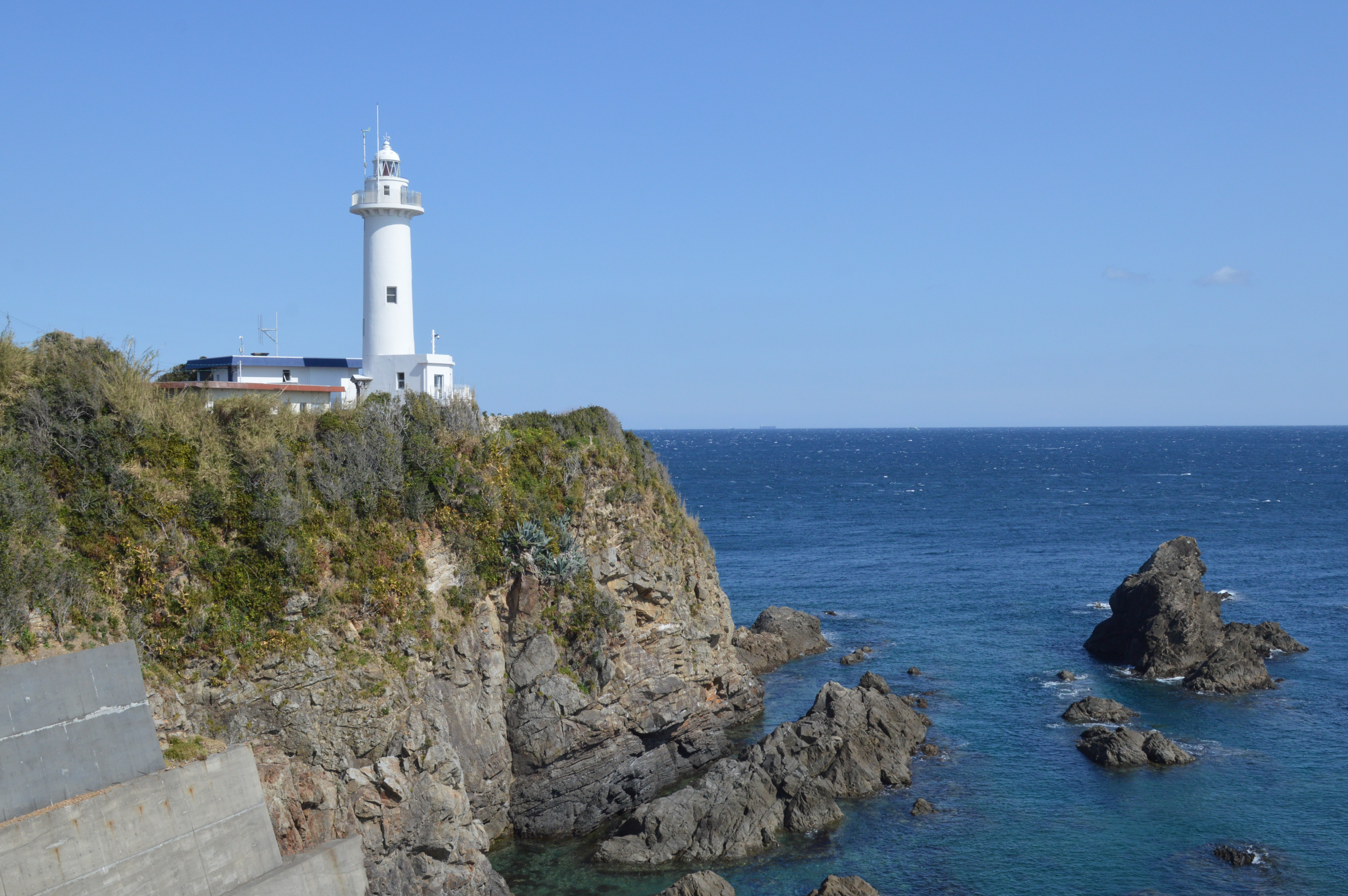
- View of Cape Daiō

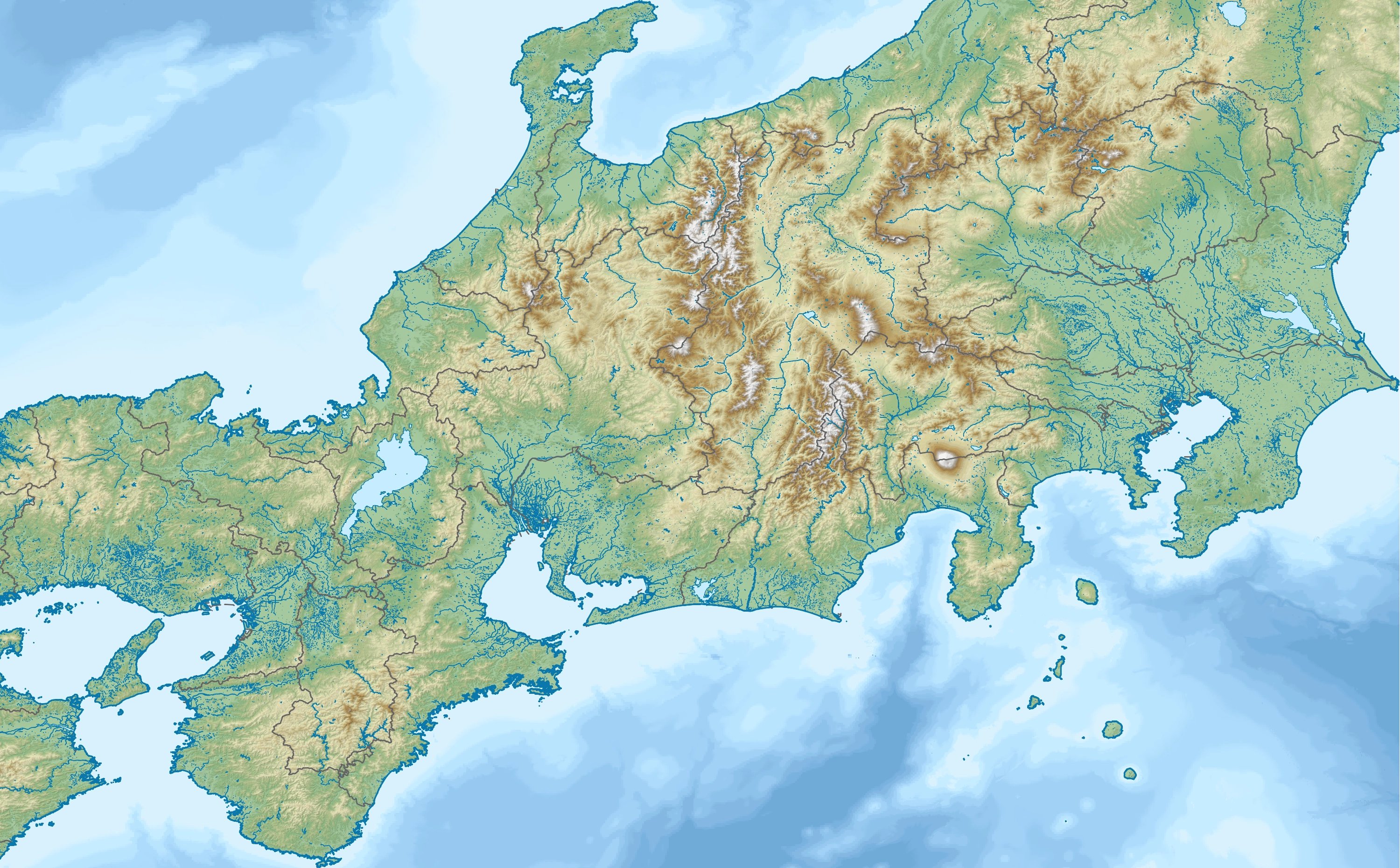
- Coordinates: 34°16′34″N 136°54′1″E
- Location: Shima, Mie Prefecture, Japan
- Offshore water bodies: Pacific Ocean

Cape Daiō (大王崎, Daiō-zaki) is a cape located in the Kii Peninsula in Shima, Mie in Japan.

== The lighthouse ==
The lighthouse of Cape Daiō was built in 1927. It was damaged by aerial bombardment during the Pacific War (1941-1945) and by the passage of Typhoon Vera in 1959. The limestone structure visible in 2015 is a renovated version of the original dating back to 1978.
