= Bulldog-class survey vessel =

1968 class of British survey vessels

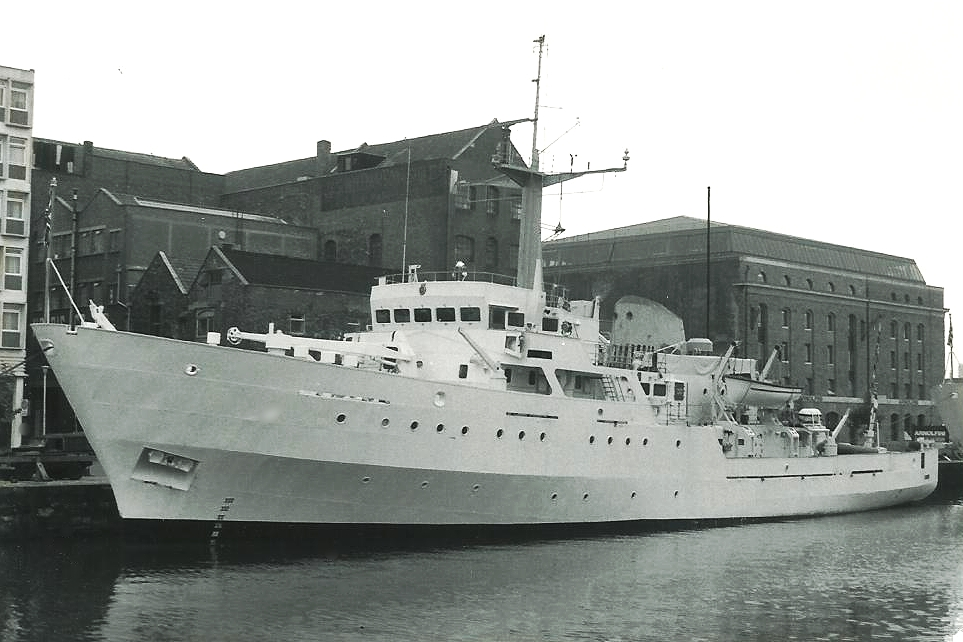
- HMS Fawn

Class overview
- Name: Bulldog class
- Builders: Brooke Marine, Lowestoft
- Operators: Royal Navy Nigerian Navy
- Preceded by: Hecla
- Succeeded by: Echo class
- Subclasses: 1
- Built: 1967–1976
- In commission: 1968–2002
- Completed: 5
- Retired: 5

General characteristics
- Type: Survey vessel
- Displacement: 1,050 long tons (1,067 t)
- Length: 189 ft 6 in (57.76 m)
- Beam: 37 ft 5 in (11.40 m)
- Draught: 12 ft (3.7 m)
- Propulsion: 4 × Lister Blackstone diesel engines; 660 bhp each; 2 × shafts
- Speed: 15 knots (17 mph; 28 km/h)
- Range: 4,000 nautical miles (7,400 km) at 12 knots (14 mph; 22 km/h)
- Boats & landing craft carried: 2 × 9.5 m survey boats
- Complement: 4 officers; 34 ratings
- Sensors & processing systems: 1 × 1007
- Armament: None (fitted for 2 × 20 mm Oerlikon GP)

The Bulldog class was a four ship class of survey vessels in service with the Royal Navy and Nigerian Navy NNS Lana A498 from the late 1960s until the start of the 21st century. Initially designed with service overseas in mind, they spent most of their careers off the British coast. A sixth ship was subsequently built to a modified design to support them in their activities. Decommissioned and sold off at the end of the 20th and start of the 21st centuries, they have continued in service as civilian vessels, with some being converted to private yachts and others entering other commercial sectors.

== Design ==
The Bulldogs were designated as coastal survey vessels, and were a smaller variant of the earlier Hecla-class designs. All five ships were built by Brooke Marine utilising merchant hulls. The resulting design was stable in a variety of sea conditions, and the class was considered to be good seakeepers, with an all-welded construction, a bulbous bow and a high flared forecastle. Anti-rolling tanks and twin rudders were also fitted. The ships used eight-cylinder Lister Blackstone diesel engines powering two variable-pitch propellers and were fitted with precise navaids, specialised echo-sounders, magnetometer and a variety of sonar and radar. Bulldog was retrospectively fitted with Marconi Hydrosearch sector scanning sonar. In addition they carried two small surveying boats (18 ft/35 ft), fitted with an array of equipment and capable of conducting surveys in shallow water.

== Careers ==
They were intended to serve overseas in pairs, with four ships being ordered in the late 1960/70's: Bulldog and Beagle; Fawn and Fox. with a fifth vessel ordered in 1973 for the Nigerian Naval Service NNS Lana. Despite the original intention to use them overseas, the growth of the exploitation of the oil and gas reserves in the North Sea from the 1960s onwards led to them spending most of their time engaged in survey work off the British coast. With the Nigerian vessel engaged in survey work of the Nigerian coast. The increased demand for their services led to the Admiralty ordering a sixth ship to a modified design in the 1980s, which became HMS Roebuck.

Fox was the first of the class to leave service, being sold to commercial interests in April 1989. Fawn was paid off in October 1991 and sold to interests in West Germany to become an offshore support vessel of the West African and Chinese coasts under the name Red Fulmar. Bulldog was paid off on 26 July 2001 and sold the following month for conversion to a luxury yacht. A major fire broke out while she was moored at Nelson, New Zealand and the conversion was not completed. Beagle was the last to leave service. She was paid off on 7 February 2002 and sold the following month to a yacht company at Poole for conversion.

== Ships ==
Name	Pennant	Builder	Launched	Completed	Commissioned	Fate	
Bulldog sub-group
Bulldog	A317	Brooke Marine, Lowestoft	12 July 1967	1968	21 March 1968	Sold to private company, August 2001	
Beagle	A319	Brooke Marine, Lowestoft	7 September 1967	1968	9 May 1968	Sold to private company as MY Titan, March 2002	
Fawn	A325	Brooke Marine, Lowestoft	29 February 1968	10 September 1968	4 October 1968	Sold to commercial interest, October 1991	
Fox	A320	Brooke Marine, Lowestoft	6 November 1967	1968	11 July 1968	Sold in April 1989 - Sank on relaunch HV Fox / Ultra Plus 2010 Bangkok. Delivered 2014 to Hong Kong, renamed Toy Heaven.	
Lana	A498	Brooke Marine, Lowestoft	5 April 1974	4 March 1976	15 July 1976	Decommissioned 2000	
Roebuck	H130	Brooke Marine, Lowestoft	14 November 1985	3 October 1986		Decommissioned 2010. Sold to Bangladesh Navy as BNS Anushandhan	Roebuck sub-group
