= Edmund Irving =

English naval hydrographer

Rear-Admiral Sir Edmund Irving KBE CB FRGS
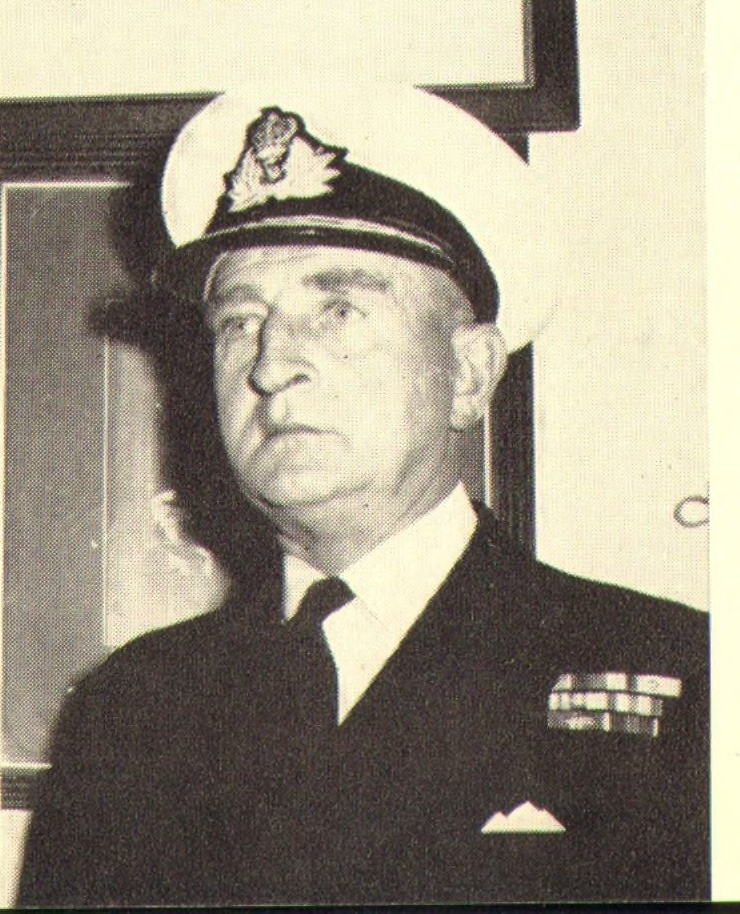
- Born: 5 April 1910; North Borneo
- Died: 1 October 1990 (aged 80)
- Allegiance: United Kingdom
- Branch: Royal Navy
- Service years: 1924-1966
- Rank: Rear admiral
- Office: Hydrographer of the Navy
- Term: 1960-1965

Rear-Admiral Sir Edmund George Irving, KBE, CB, FRGS (5 April 1910 – 1 October 1990) was a naval hydrographer.

== Early life ==
Irving was born in Sandakan, British North Borneo to the resident magistrate George Clerk Irving and his wife Ethel Mary Frances Poole.

== Education ==
Irving attended St Anthony's preparatory school, Eastbourne, and the Royal Naval College, Dartmouth. He then went to sea as a cadet in HMS Royal Oak in 1927.

== Career ==
In 1931 Irving joined the Royal Naval Surveying Service. In 1944, when in command of HMS Franklin, Irving resurveyed a number of the ports and harbours in north-west Europe as they fell into allied hands. After his ship berthed in Terneuzen his surveys of the Schelde enabled allied shipping to carry military supplies to Antwerp.

In 1948 Irving carried out sea trials of the newly developed two-range Decca system for fixing the position of surveying ships when out of sight of land in HMS Sharpshooter.

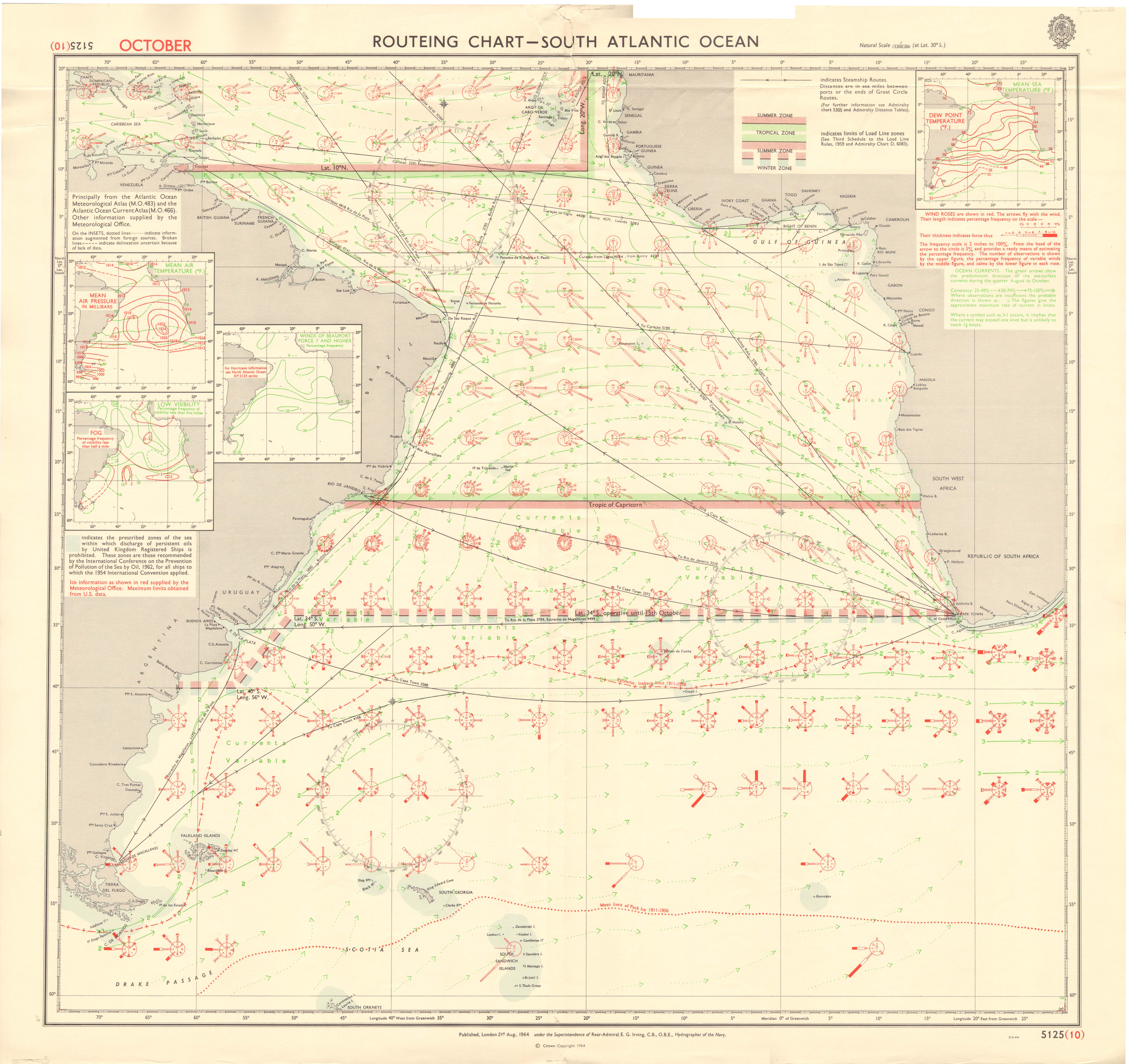
One of the routeing charts for the South Atlantic Ocean, prepared under the supervision of E.G. Irving as Hydrographer of the Navy

In the late 1950s, as a rear admiral, he was appointed Hydrographer of the Navy. In this position he convinced the Admiralty that purpose-built survey vessels would be cheaper than converted naval vessels, the first being launched as HMS Hecla in 1964. He retired in 1966, subsequently working for the Decca company.

== Honours ==
Irving was president of the Institute of Navigation from 1964 to 1967. He was president of the Royal Geographical Society (1969–71) and received their Patron's Medal in 1976.

Mount Irving in the South Shetland Islands was named in his honour.
