= HMS Enterprise (A71) =

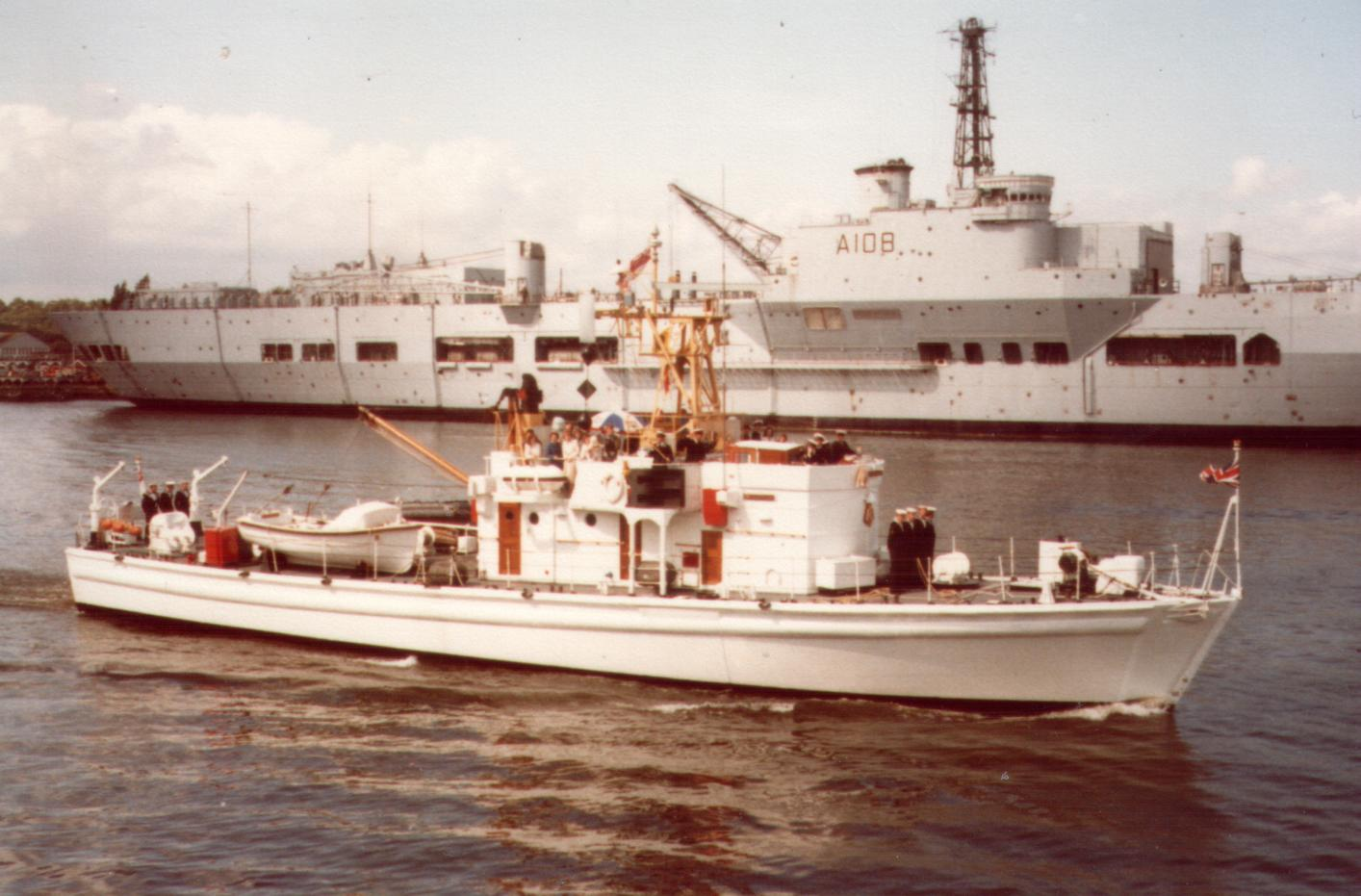
- HMS Enterprise

History

United Kingdom
- Name: HMS Enterprise
- Builder: M.W. Blackmore & Sons, Bideford
- Commissioned: 1959
- Fate: scrapped, 2023

General characteristics
- Class & type: Echo-class survey ship
- Displacement: 120 long tons (122 t) standard; 160 long tons (163 t) full
- Length: 100 ft (30 m) p/p; 106 ft (32 m) o/a
- Beam: 22 ft (6.7 m)
- Draught: 6 ft 9 in (2.06 m)
- Propulsion: Paxman diesel engines, 1,400 bhp (1,044 kW), 2 shafts, 15 tons diesel fuel
- Speed: 14 knots (26 km/h; 16 mph)
- Range: 4,500 nmi (8,300 km) at 12 kn (22 km/h; 14 mph)
- Complement: 18
- Armament: None

The ninth HMS Enterprise (A 71) of the Royal Navy was an Echo-class inshore survey ship built by M.W. Blackmore & Sons of Bideford and commissioned in 1959.

With her sister ships HMS Echo and HMS Egeria, Enterprise's career was spent in hydrographic surveys of the seas, sandbanks, and coastlines of the East Coast and Eastern English Channel. She was well known around the harbours of Eastern England, and showed the flag on many official visits to Belgian, Dutch, and German ports on the North Sea coast, and as far up the Rhine as Cologne. After the American television series Star Trek became popular, Enterprise inevitably became known throughout the Navy as "the Starship." She was put up for disposal by sale in 1985. In 2023 she was scrapped in Kilkeel harbour after sinking in shallow water.
