= BNS Anushandhan =

Survey vessel of the Bangladesh Navy, previously Royal Navy

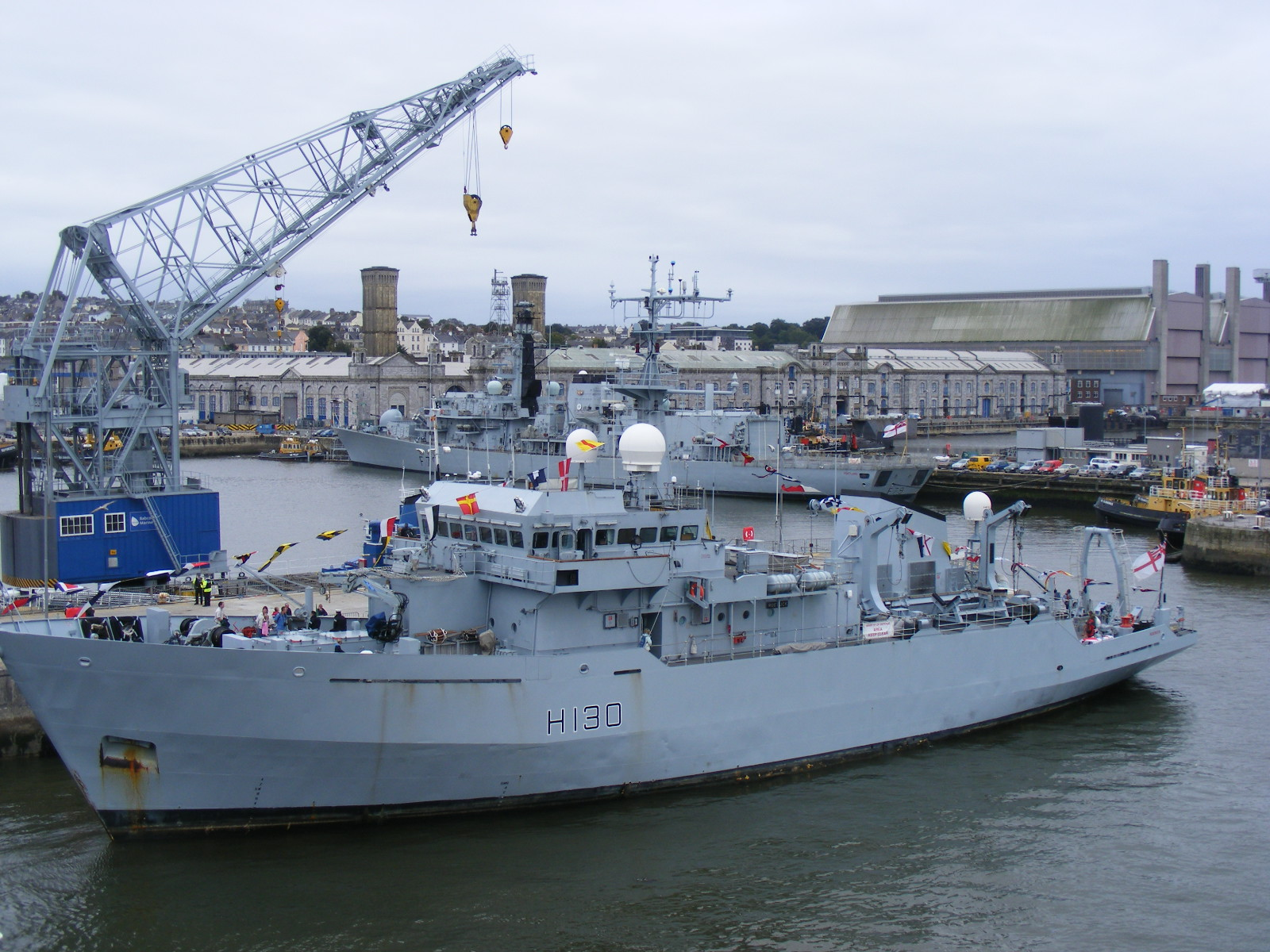
- HMS Roebuck at HMNB Devonport in August 2006

History

United Kingdom
- Name: HMS Roebuck
- Operator: Royal Navy
- Builder: Brooke Marine, Lowestoft
- Launched: 14 November 1985
- Sponsored by: Lady Cassels, wife of Admiral Cassels, last commander of the previous HMS Roebuck
- Completed: August 1986
- Commissioned: 3 October 1986
- Decommissioned: 15 April 2010
- Home port: HMNB Devonport, Plymouth
- Identification: IMO number: 8410196; Pennant number: H130
- Fate: Sold to Bangladesh Navy in 2010

Bangladesh
- Name: BNS Anushandhan
- Operator: Bangladesh Navy
- Acquired: 28 May 2010
- Commissioned: 29 December 2010
- Home port: Chittagong
- Identification: IMO number: 8410196; MMSI number: 405000085; Call sign: H584
- Status: Active

General characteristics
- Displacement: 1,477 tonnes
- Length: 64.01 m (210.0 ft)
- Beam: 13.03 m (42.7 ft)
- Draught: 4 m (13 ft)
- Depth: 6.13 m (20.1 ft)
- Propulsion: 2 × screws; 2 × Mirrlees Blackstone ES8 supercharged diesel engines
- Speed: 15 knots (28 km/h; 17 mph)
- Complement: 52
- Armament: 20 mm BMARC gun; Miniguns; GPMGs

BNS Anushandhan is a survey vessel of the Bangladesh Navy. She previously served with the Royal Navy as the coastal survey vessel HMS Roebuck from 3 October 1986 to 15 April 2010. She was the last traditional survey ship to serve in the Royal Navy. In 2010, she was sold to the Bangladesh Navy. She is the first dedicated hydrographic survey ship to serve with Bangladesh Navy.

== Construction ==
Brooke Marine built the ship at Lowestoft, Suffolk, launching her on 14 November 1985 and completing her in August 1986. She has twin screws, each powered by an eight-cylinder Mirrlees Blackstone diesel engine.

== Royal Navy service ==
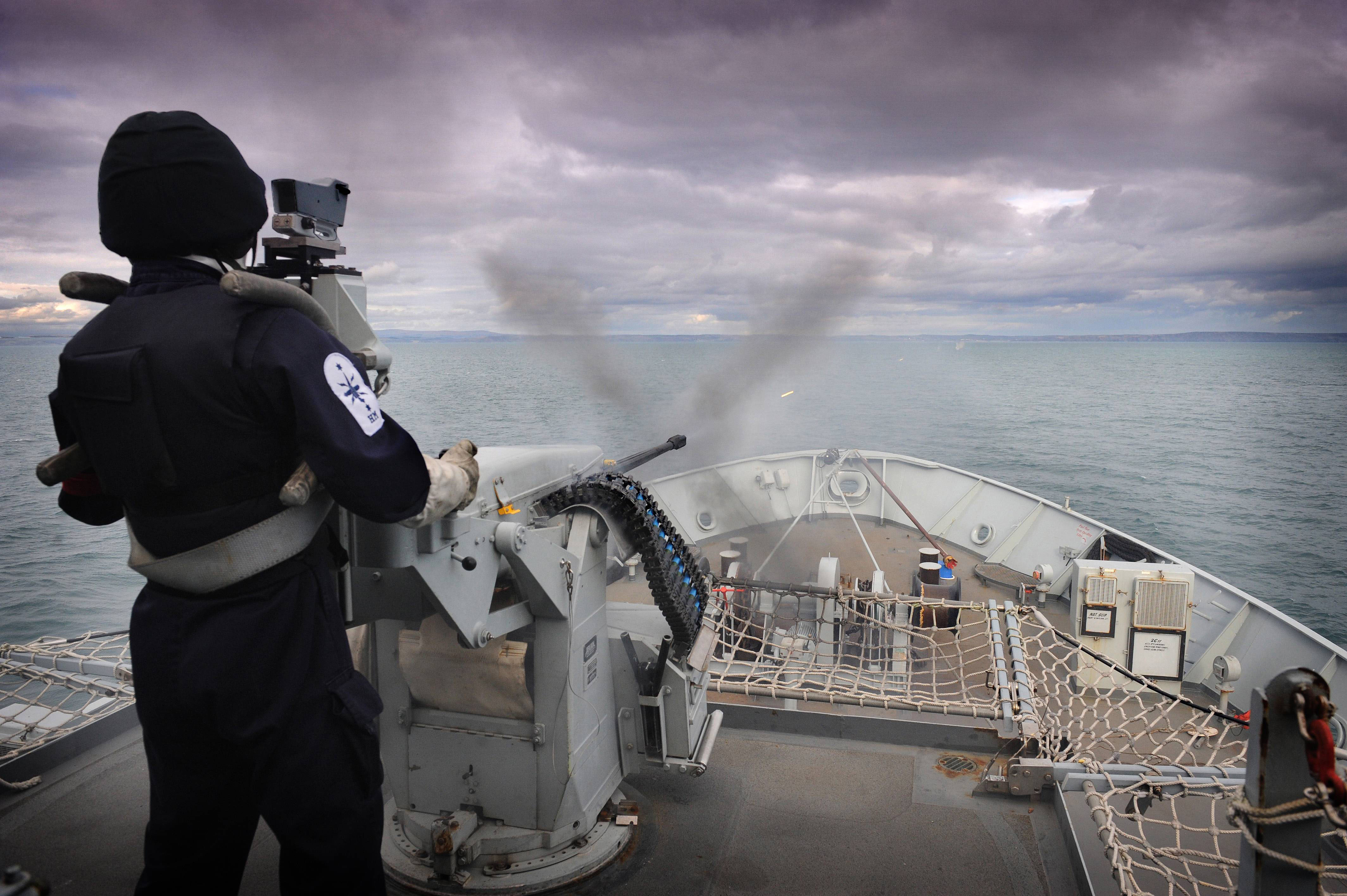
20mm Gambo Cannon Firing on HMS Roebuck, 2010 (MOD)

Although nominally used for surveying along the United Kingdom continental shelf, with the downsizing of the survey fleet, Roebuck was enhanced to enable her to operate overseas. She was fitted with a full suite of hydrographic sensors, and a Survey Motor Boat for inshore work. In addition, as with the other vessels of the survey squadron, she could also operate as a support ship for mine warfare vessels. Roebuck was due to be decommissioned in 2003 following the entry into service of the Echo class. However, the decision was then taken to keep the ship in service until 2014, though this was later revised in December 2009 to a 2010 decommissioning. It was declared that the ship had been sold to the Bangladesh Navy for £5 million. Her last commanding officer was Lieutenant-Commander Richard Bird.

Roebuck was the first RN ship into Umm Qasr Port following the second Gulf War. The work she carried out prior to, and during, the war proved invaluable, allowing coalition ships to operate closer to shore than previously thought possible, and reducing helicopter flying time by ten minutes per sortie during the landings.

Roebuck completed a Ship Life Extension Period (refit) towards the end of 2005, and then deployed to the Mediterranean, returning to the UK in April 2006. Roebuck then deployed to East Africa in June 2006, returning on Monday 21 August 2006. Upon arrival in August, the crew had barely a few hours' notice before the ship was placed on display at HMNB Devonport Navy Days 2006 as the representative of the Hydrographic Squadron after HMS Enterprise could not attend.

During 2008 Roebuck acted as the Command Platform for the NATO minehunting group SNMCMG1 (NATO Standing Naval Mine Countermeasures Group 1).

It was announced on 16 December 2009, that Roebuck would be decommissioned in 2010. She was decommissioned at HMNB Devonport on 15 April 2010. She was handed over to the Bangladesh Navy on 28 May and sailed on 1 June 2010.

=== Affiliations ===
Her affiliations according to her official website were:-

The Worshipful Company of Scientific Instrument Makers, the town of Didcot in Oxfordshire, TS Roebuck, the sea cadet unit based at Norton Manor Camp in Taunton in Somerset, and 130 (Bournemouth) Squadron of the Air Training Corps.

== Bangladesh Navy service ==
The ship reached Chittagong on 23 July 2010. On her way to Bangladesh, the ship visited ports of Gibraltar, Morocco, Egypt, Saudi Arabia, Cyprus, Oman and Sri Lanka. She was commissioned to the Bangladesh Navy on 29 December 2010. She played an important role to secure the maritime boundary verdict against Myanmar and India by supplying accurate data.

It is scheduled to be replaced by HMS Enterprise in 2027.

=== Equipment ===
The ship is fitted with a full suite of hydrographic sensors. She also carries a survey motor boat for inshore work. In October 2011 she was fitted with shallow-water multibeam echo-sounder. Its four Mirrlees Blackstone ES8 supercharged diesel engines can drive twin controllable pitch propellers via two gearboxes.

=== Mission ===
The mission of this ship is to maintain the marine environment and navigability of the rivers, delimitate the maritime boundary and preserve the coastal area by collecting the necessary information and statistical data. She will also play a significant role in research activities and extraction of marine resources. She can also act as a support ship for mine warfare vessels.
