= HMS Beagle (A319) =

Motor yacht; former survey vessel

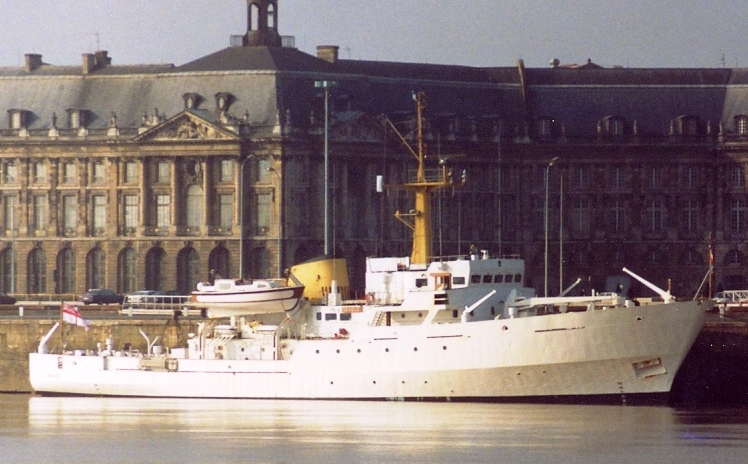
- Bordeaux Sun 1 Mar 92

History

United Kingdom
- Name: HMS Beagle
- Builder: Brooke Marine, Lowestoft
- Launched: 7 September 1967
- Commissioned: 9 May 1968
- Decommissioned: 7 February 2002
- Identification: IMO number: 4902921; MMSI number: 247244300; Callsign: IIJY2
- Fate: Sold March 2002

General characteristics
- Class & type: Bulldog class survey vessel
- Displacement: 1,050 long tons
- Length: 189.6 ft (57.8 m) o/a
- Beam: 37.5 ft (11.4 m)
- Propulsion: Four Lister Blackstone ER58M 8-cylinder diesel engines, 2,640 bhp, twin screws, variable pitch propellers.
- Speed: 15 knots (28 km/h; 17 mph)
- Range: 4,500 miles (at 12 knots)
- Complement: 45

HMS Beagle was a Bulldog class coastal survey vessel of the Royal Navy and was the ninth to bear the name.

== History ==
She was originally to have been called HMS Barracouta but her name was changed to HMS Beagle in honour of the ship, under the Command of Robert FitzRoy, which carried Charles Darwin.

She was built by yacht builder Brooke Marine, to commercial, rather than military, ship standards at a cost of £53,000,000 at 2007 prices. She was launched on 7 September 1967 by Mrs. GS Ritchie, wife of the then Hydrographer of the Navy, Rear Admiral GS Ritchie CB DSC FRICS and commissioned the following year. The class was the last Royal Navy vessels to have wooden (over steel) decks.

During her Royal Naval service, Beagle travelled throughout the world from the Indian Ocean to the West Indies and Scotland to South Africa. Originally designed to work in pairs, since the early 1980s Beagle generally worked alone around the UK shores progressing the areas not covered by side-scan sonars. Following a half-life refit in 1990, Beagle was fitted with the most modern Surveying Information Processing System (SIPS) which revolutionised the way sheets were drawn and surveys conducted.

Beagle had a ship's company of 45 Royal Naval personnel and was classed as a Warship under the White Ensign.

The well-equipped galley, situated on 2 deck amidships, fed the whole ship's company to a very high standard. The Wardroom, just to starboard, the Senior Rates Mess just aft and the Junior Ratings mess forward, all having easy access. All accommodation, except the Captain's, was on 3 deck. The Junior Ratings had a 28-berth mess deck forward, the Senior Rates lived in double cabins and the Officers had a mixture of two double-berth and two single-berth cabins. All accommodation spaces were air conditioned and this coupled with good sea-keeping qualities made these ships very comfortable indeed.

Specifically designed for Hydrographic Surveying, she was extensively modernised during her life with the original 28 ft survey launch being replaced with a 31 ft survey launch "FitzRoy" and the original 18 ft survey launch replaced with a Sea Rider RIB and associated davit. Designed originally to carry a SWB Land-Rover on the focsle, to be lifted on and off with the forward crane which also plumbed the forward survey hold.

Of the four ships in the class, Fox was sold in 1989, Fawn in 1991, and Bulldog in 2001.

Beagle was affiliated with the Devon town of Newton Abbot, the Norton Fitzwarren Royal Naval Association, the 2nd Gosport Beagle Cub Pack, Ruthin School CCF & the Bulldog, Beagle & Boadicea Old Crews Association.

She served in the Royal Navy until 7 February 2002 when she was paid off. She was sold in March that year for £750,000 to a yacht company in Poole for conversion. In 2002 she was refitted into a four deck luxury yacht and renamed MY Titan. She was able to sleep 22 guests and accommodate 20 crew.

In 2019 a second major refurbishment brought the vessel to world-class cruising specifications with the new name Aqua Blu. She now has 15 guest suites finished in a black and ivory theme, with the highest international safety classifications (RINA, SOLAS, ISM). She is now additionally equipped with Quantum Zero Speed stabilizers and operates in Indonesia and the surrounding waters.
