= HMS Franklin =

Minesweeper of the Royal Navy

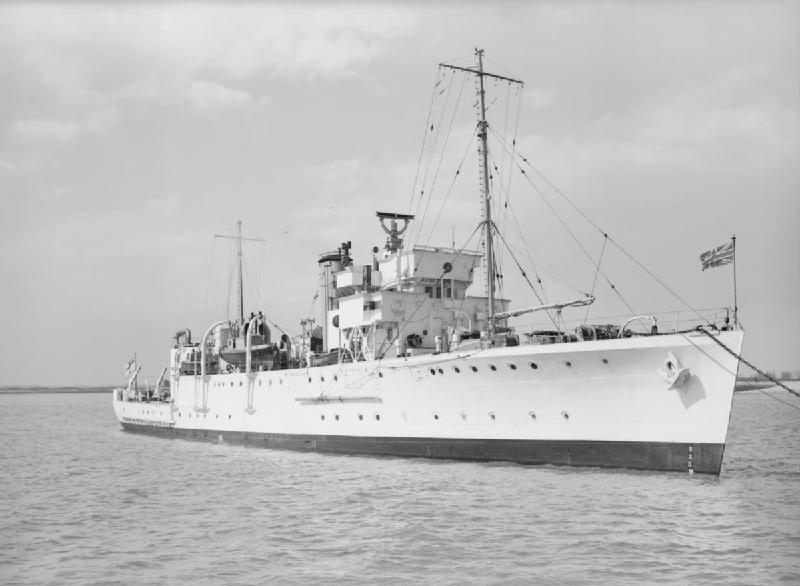
- HMS Franklin, 1946

History

United Kingdom
- Name: HMS Franklin
- Namesake: John Franklin
- Ordered: 4 September 1936
- Builder: Ailsa Shipbuilding Company, Troon
- Laid down: 17 December 1936
- Launched: 22 December 1937
- Commissioned: 17 August 1938
- Decommissioned: January 1953
- Honours and awards: Normandy 1944
- Fate: Scrapped, 1956
- Badge: On a field Blue a dolphin embowed White pierced through the sides with two fishing spears in saltire Gold

General characteristics
- Class & type: Halcyon-class minesweeper
- Displacement: 875 long tons (889 t) standard; 1,350 long tons (1,372 t) full load
- Length: 245 ft 9 in (74.90 m) o/a
- Beam: 33 ft 6 in (10.21 m)
- Draught: 9 ft (2.7 m)
- Propulsion: 2 × Admiralty 3-drum water-tube boilers; Parsons steam turbines; 2,000 shp (1,500 kW) on 2 shafts
- Speed: 16.5 knots (30.6 km/h; 19.0 mph)
- Range: 7,200 nmi (13,300 km; 8,300 mi) at 10 kn (19 km/h; 12 mph)
- Complement: 121
- Armament: 1 × 12-pounder AA gun forward (wartime only)

HMS Franklin (J84) was a Halcyon-class minesweeper (officially, "fleet minesweeping sloop") of the British Royal Navy, which was commissioned in 1938 as a survey ship. She served as such throughout World War II, continuing in that role until decommissioned in 1953.

== Service history ==
The ship was built by the Ailsa Shipbuilding Company, Troon, with engines provided by Thornycroft of Woolston. She was laid down on 17 December 1936 and launched on 22 December 1937. As a survey ship she differed from the others in her class by having a larger bridge, and a surveying chartroom aft. During the war the ship was armed with a 12-pounder anti-aircraft gun forward.

Franklin was commissioned on 17 August 1938, and carried out surveys off the Thames Estuary. In June 1939 she was sent to survey St Lewis Inlet, Newfoundland, but in August was ordered home in anticipation of the outbreak of World War II. During the war she carried out surveys around the coast of the UK, mostly in connection with the laying of minefields. In June 1944, under the command of Lt.Cdr. Edmund Irving, she was deployed off the French coast, following the Normandy landings, surveying ports as they fell to Allied forces. By November she was surveying the entrance to the Scheldt.

Following VE Day on 8 May 1945, she carried out wreck and mine clearance surveys in German ports, finally returning to the UK in October 1945. Franklin remained in service, mainly operating off the eastern coast of England, until decommissioned in January 1953. She was then placed in Reserve, until placed on the Disposal List, and sold for breaking up by Clayton and Davie, Dunston-on-Tyne. She was towed to the breaker's yard in February 1956.
