= HMS Fox (A320) =

Hydrographic survey ship

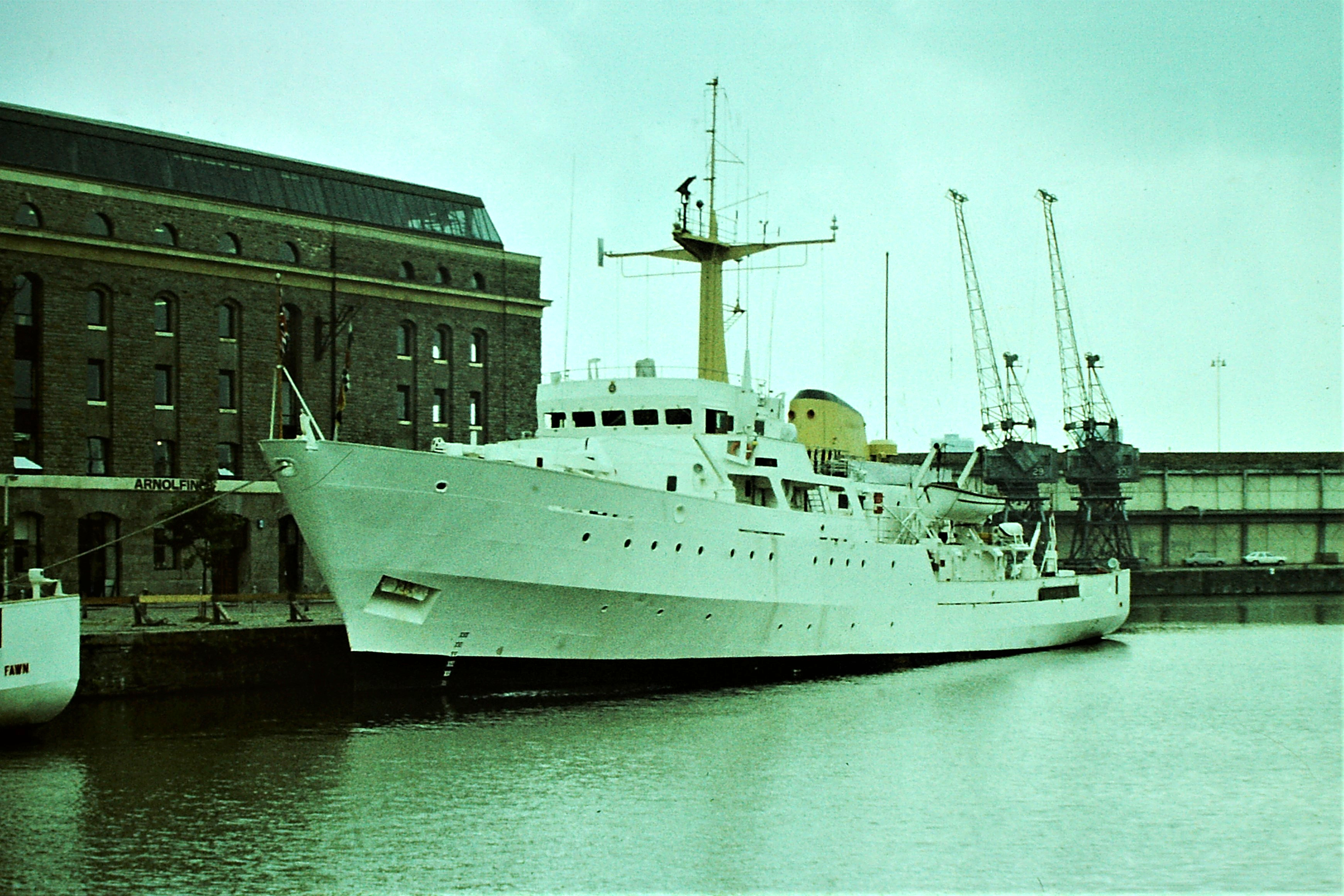
- Fox docked in Bristol Harbour, 1977

History

United Kingdom
- Name: HMS Fox
- Builder: Brooke Marine, Lowestoft, England
- Launched: 6 November 1967
- Commissioned: 11 July 1968
- Decommissioned: 1998
- Identification: IMO number: 8728359
- Fate: Sold 8 March 1989

General characteristics
- Displacement: 800 long tons (813 t) standard; 1,088 long tons (1,105 t) full load
- Length: 57.6 m (189 ft 0 in)
- Beam: 11.2 m (36 ft 9 in)
- Draught: 3.7 m (12 ft 2 in)
- Propulsion: 4 × Lister Blackstone ERS8M 8-cylinder diesel engines, 2,640 bhp (1,969 kW), twin shafts
- Speed: 15 kn (28 km/h; 17 mph)
- Range: 4,500 nmi (8,300 km; 5,200 mi) at 12 kn (22 km/h; 14 mph)
- Complement: 5 officers, 34 ratings
- Armament: Provision for 2 × 20 mm cannon

HMS Fox, pennant number A320, was a Bulldog-class hydrographic survey ship of the British Royal Navy.
