= JDS Harushio (SS-563) =

Asashio-class submarines

History

Japan
- Name: Harushio; (はるしお)
- Ordered: 1964
- Builder: Mitsubishi, Kobe
- Laid down: 12 October 1965
- Launched: 25 February 1967
- Commissioned: 1 December 1967
- Decommissioned: 30 March 1984
- Identification: Pennant number: SS-563
- Fate: Scrapped, March 1985

General characteristics
- Class & type: Asashio-class submarine
- Displacement: 1,650 long tons (1,676 t) surfaced; 2,250 long tons (2,286 t) submerged
- Length: 88 m (288 ft 9 in)
- Beam: 8.2 m (26 ft 11 in)
- Draft: 4.9 m (16 ft 1 in)
- Depth: 7.5 m (24 ft 7 in)
- Propulsion: Diesel-electric, 2 shafts; 2,900 bhp (2,200 kW) (surfaced); 6,300 shp (4,700 kW) (submerged)
- Speed: 14 knots (26 km/h; 16 mph) surfaced; 18 knots (33 km/h; 21 mph) submerged
- Complement: 80
- Armament: 8 × 533 mm (21 in) torpedo tubes (6 × bow-tube, 2 × stern-tube)

JDS Harushio (SS-563) was the second boat of the Asashio-class submarines. She was commissioned on 1 December 1967.

== Construction and career ==
Harushio was laid down at Mitsubishi Heavy Industries Kobe Shipyard on 12 October 1965 and launched on 25 February 1967. She was commissioned on 1 December 1967, into the 1st Submarine Group as a ship under direct control.

On 16 March 1968, she was reorganized into the 3rd Submarine under the 1st Submarine Group, and she was incorporated with Asashio.

Harushio participated in Hawaii dispatch training from June 20 to September 9, 1969.

On 9 September 1970, while she was participating in a Maritime Self-Defense Force exercise, Harushio collided with Ōi while diving west of Tsugaru Strait, damaging her periscope.

She participated in Hawaii dispatch training from September 15 to November 30, 1973. On October 16, the same year, the 3rd Submarine was reorganized into the 2nd Submarine Group, which was newly formed under the Self-Defense Fleet.

On 1 March 1983, she became a ship under the direct control of the 2nd Submarine Group.

She was decommissioned on 30 March 1984 and dismantled at Tokai Dock in March 1985.
