= JDS Ōshio =

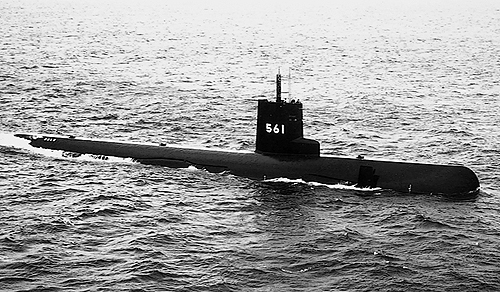
- JDS Ōshio

Class overview
- Operators: Japan Maritime Self-Defense Force
- Preceded by: Natsushio class
- Succeeded by: Asashio class

History

Japan
- Name: Ōshio; (おおしお)
- Ordered: 1961
- Builder: Mitsubishi, Kobe
- Laid down: 29 June 1963
- Launched: 30 April 1964
- Commissioned: 31 March 1965
- Decommissioned: 20 August 1981
- Home port: Kure
- Fate: Scrapped, March 1982

General characteristics
- Type: Submarine
- Displacement: 1,600 long tons (1,626 t) surfaced; 2,200 long tons (2,235 t) submerged
- Length: 88 m (288 ft 9 in)
- Beam: 8.2 m (26 ft 11 in)
- Draft: 4.7 m (15 ft 5 in)
- Depth: 7.5 m (24 ft 7 in)
- Propulsion: Kawasaki-MAN V8V 24 Diesel-electric, 2 shafts; 2,200 kW (2,900 bhp) (surfaced); 4,700 kW (6,300 shp) (submerged)
- Speed: 14 knots (26 km/h; 16 mph) surfaced; 18 knots (33 km/h; 21 mph) submerged
- Complement: 83
- Armament: 8 × 533 mm (21 in) torpedo tubes (6 × bow-tube, 2 × stern-tube)

JDS Ōshio (SS-561) was a submarine in service with Japanese Maritime Self Defense Force. Ōshio was planned and built to replace the aging JDS Kuroshio.

== Background ==
In 1955, the Japan Maritime Self-Defense Force received a loan from the United States Navy (USN) for the Gato-class submarine USS Mingo and recommissioned the vessel as the first JDS Kuroshio to begin the development (reconstruction) of the submarine force. Subsequently, by building the first Oyashio in the 1956 plan, domestic construction of submarines was resumed. In the subsequent First Defense Build-up Plan, from the perspective of arranging the numbers, the development of a small submarine (SSK) for local defense, which was modeled after the Barracuda class of the USN, was promoted, and the plan for 1959. Then, the Yashio type, the Natsushio type was built in the 1960 plan.

However, these small submarines had serious restrictions on their snorkeling and surface navigation capabilities, especially in stormy weather, which became a serious problem for submarine operations in the waters near Japan. In addition, since the USN had changed its policy to develop a large submarine such as the Tang-class submarine, the Maritime Self-Defense Force decided to follow suit, building a larger submarine (SSL) with excellent seakeeping. Only one ship of the class was greenlit in the naval plan of 1958, serving as a replacement ship for JDS Kuroshio.

== Design ==
The design of this ship uses the same technology as preceding diesel-electric submarines, but is expanded to almost the same size as the original Kuroshio.

This ship was designed as an underwater high-speed nautical submarine similar to other contemporary diesel-electric submarines. The hull structure is of double-hulled construction, but is somewhat slimmed down, with the aft of the vessel being of a partial single-hulled construction. As for the material of the pressure hull, NS46 tempered high-strength steel (yield strength 46 kgf / mm2 / 451MPa), which was limited only to the frame in earlier Japanese submarines, was fully adopted.

The propulsion system is a twin screwed diesel-electric system, and the basic configuration is similar to the system on the Oyashio. Diesel engines, two V-type 16-cylinder Kawasaki / MAN V8V 24 / 30m MAL, were installed. This is based on the Oyashios V8V 22 / 30m MAL, with the bore (piston diameter) expanded to increase the output. [6].

For electric propulsion, two Fuji Electric SG-3 traction motors (1,200 kW) and two Fuji Electric SM-3 traction motors (1,450 horsepower on water / 3,150 horsepower underwater), and 480 SCB-47W main storage batteries (4 groups of 120 each) were installed. The SCB-47W main storage battery is a water-cooled agitated fiber-clad lead battery similar to earlier submarines, but its life is longer and its discharge capacity is lower than before. This allowed for greater underwater endurance.

The propeller is the same 5-blade screw propeller (453 rpm) as used on preceding classes, but the shaping has been improved and the material changed to an aluminum-bronze alloy.

== Equipment ==
The sonar arrangement is similar to the Natsushio class. Its passive sonar, the JQO-3, is located at the bottom of the bow and the JQO-4 is located inside a dome on the front end of the sail. Its active sonar, the JQS-3 was mounted on the bottom of the ship below the command post in a hanging manner, similar to the Oyashio. The periscope, originally 10-meters, was subsequently refit with a longer 13-meter design.

Six torpedo tubes were placed on the bow and two at the stern. All of these are 533 millimetres (21 in), with the ones on the bow being the hydraulically-fired HU-601, and the stern tubes are the swimout type HU-201, which were used to protect the ship when evacuating. It was envisioned to launch a Mk.37 mod.0-N short torpedo (483 mm, 19 in diameter). However, this equipment method was evaluated as having limited effectiveness, and it is said that it was never used. The number of torpedoes installed was 18 for Mk.54 torpedoes and Mk.37 mod.0-N, and 6 torpedoes were installed at the stern.

== Construction and career ==
Ōshio was laid down on 29 June 1963 and launched on 30 April 1964 by Mitsubishi Heavy Industries Kobe Shipyard. She was commissioned on 31 March 1965 and incorporated into the 1st Submarine Group 2nd Submarine. On 8 April 1967, while moored at Kure, a short circuit occurred in the rear control panel room while charging the storage battery, and a fire broke out from a large discharge. At this time, the inner shell was partially melted and after that, it was operated with a limit on the dive depth.

From 25 January to 14 April 1969, she participated in Hawaii dispatch training. On 26 January 1970, while Ōshio was surfacing in Hiroshima Bay, she came into contact with a small tanker (186 tonnes) and broke two propeller shafts.

From 22 September to 10 December 1971, she participated in Hawaii dispatch training.

Ōshio was decommissioned on 20 August 1981 and dismantled in March 1982. The media was allowed to film inside the vessel before dismantling.

== See also ==
- JDS Oyashio (SS-511)
