= HMS Bulldog (A317) =

History

United Kingdom
- Name: HMS Bulldog
- Builder: Brooke Marine, Lowestoft
- Launched: 12 July 1967
- Commissioned: 21 March 1968
- Decommissioned: 26 July 2001
- Identification: IMO number: 4902907
- Fate: Sold August 2001 for conversion to luxury yacht; Damaged in a fire in May 2004 in Nelson, New Zealand; Conversion not completed

General characteristics
- Class & type: Bulldog class survey vessel
- Displacement: 1,050 long tons; 1,160 tons maximum
- Length: 189.6 ft (57.8 m) o/a
- Beam: 37.5 ft (11.4 m)
- Propulsion: Four × Lister Blackstone ERS8M diesels producing 2,640 hp (1,970 kW); Coupled to two shafts fitted with controllable pitch propellers.
- Speed: 15 knots (28 km/h)
- Range: 4,500 nautical miles (8,300 km) at 12 knots (22 km/h)
- Complement: 39

HMS Bulldog was one of four Bulldog class hydrographic survey ships of the Royal Navy. She was built by the yacht builder Brooke Marine and launched in 1968.

Displacing 1088 tons and with a top speed of 15 knots, the ship was known for both her attractive lines and excellent sea keeping. Her pennant number was originally A317 but this was changed in 1998 along with that of other survey ships to an H-prefix (for Hydrographic — S for survey already being in use for submarines) to emphasise that they were survey ships rather than naval auxiliaries. She was finally decommissioned on 26 July 2001. She was sold in August 2001 for conversion into a luxury yacht. She was damaged in a fire in May 2004 whilst at Nelson, New Zealand due to the incompetence of the company Nalder and Biddle and the conversion was not completed. Last heard of she was under tow to Brisbane Australia to be scrapped.
