= Enshū Sea =

Sea area in Japan

Coordinates: 34°25′N 137°40′E

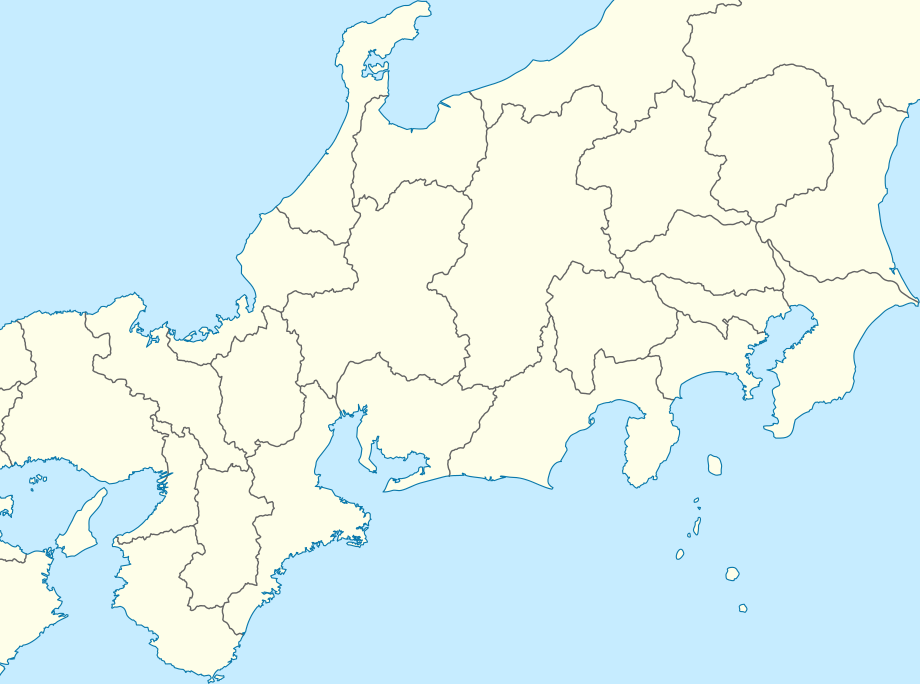
Location of Enshū Sea

Enshū Sea (Japanese: 遠州灘) is the sea area from Cape Irōzaki in Shizuoka Prefecture to Cape Daiō in Mie Prefecture. It is also called Tōtōmi Sea (Japanese: 遠江灘) or Tenryū Sea (Japanese: 天竜灘).
