= JDS Michishio (SS-564) =

Asashio-class submarines

History

Japan
- Name: Michishio; (みちしお)
- Namesake: Michishio (1937)
- Ordered: 1965
- Builder: Kawasaki, Kobe
- Laid down: 26 July 1966
- Launched: 5 December 1967
- Commissioned: 29 August 1968
- Decommissioned: 27 March 1985
- Identification: Pennant number: SS-564
- Fate: Scrapped

General characteristics
- Class & type: Asashio-class submarine
- Displacement: 1,650 long tons (1,676 t) surfaced; 2,250 long tons (2,286 t) submerged
- Length: 88 m (288 ft 9 in)
- Beam: 8.2 m (26 ft 11 in)
- Draft: 4.9 m (16 ft 1 in)
- Depth: 7.5 m (24 ft 7 in)
- Propulsion: Diesel-electric, 2 shafts; 2,900 bhp (2,200 kW) (surfaced); 6,300 shp (4,700 kW) (submerged)
- Speed: 14 knots (26 km/h; 16 mph) surfaced; 18 knots (33 km/h; 21 mph) submerged
- Complement: 80
- Armament: 8 × 533 mm (21 in) torpedo tubes (6 × bow-tube, 2 × stern-tube)

JDS Michishio (SS-564) was the third boat of the Asashio-class submarines. She was commissioned on 29 August 1968.

== Construction and career ==
Michishio was laid down at Kawasaki Heavy Industries Kobe Shipyard on 26 July 1966 and launched on 5 December 1967. She was commissioned on 29 August 1968, into the 1st Submarine Group Incorporated into the 3rd Submarine.

She participated in Hawaii dispatch training from May 15 to August 4, 1970.

On 16 October 1973, the 3rd Submarine was reorganized into the 2nd Submarine Group, which was newly formed under the Self-Defense Fleet.

On 20 August 1981, Michishio was transferred to the 2nd Submarine Group of the 1st Submarine Group.

She was decommissioned on 27 March 1985.
