= HMS Yaxham =

Minesweeper of the Royal Navy

History

United Kingdom
- Name: HMS Yaxham
- Namesake: Yaxham
- Builder: J. Samuel White
- Launched: 21 January 1958
- Completed: 19 March 1959
- Fate: Used as target, 1986

General characteristics
- Class & type: Ham-class minesweeper
- Notes: Pennant number(s): M2780 / IMS80

HMS Yaxham was one of 93 ships of the Ham class of inshore minesweepers.

Their names were all chosen from villages ending in -ham. The minesweeper was named after Yaxham in Norfolk.

Became survey vessel HMS Woodlark, 1964. Her final years were as the Southampton University Royal Naval Unit's training vessel. This unit now has HMS Blazer, a P2000 Archer-class patrol vessel.
