= Asashio-class submarine =

Japanese warship class

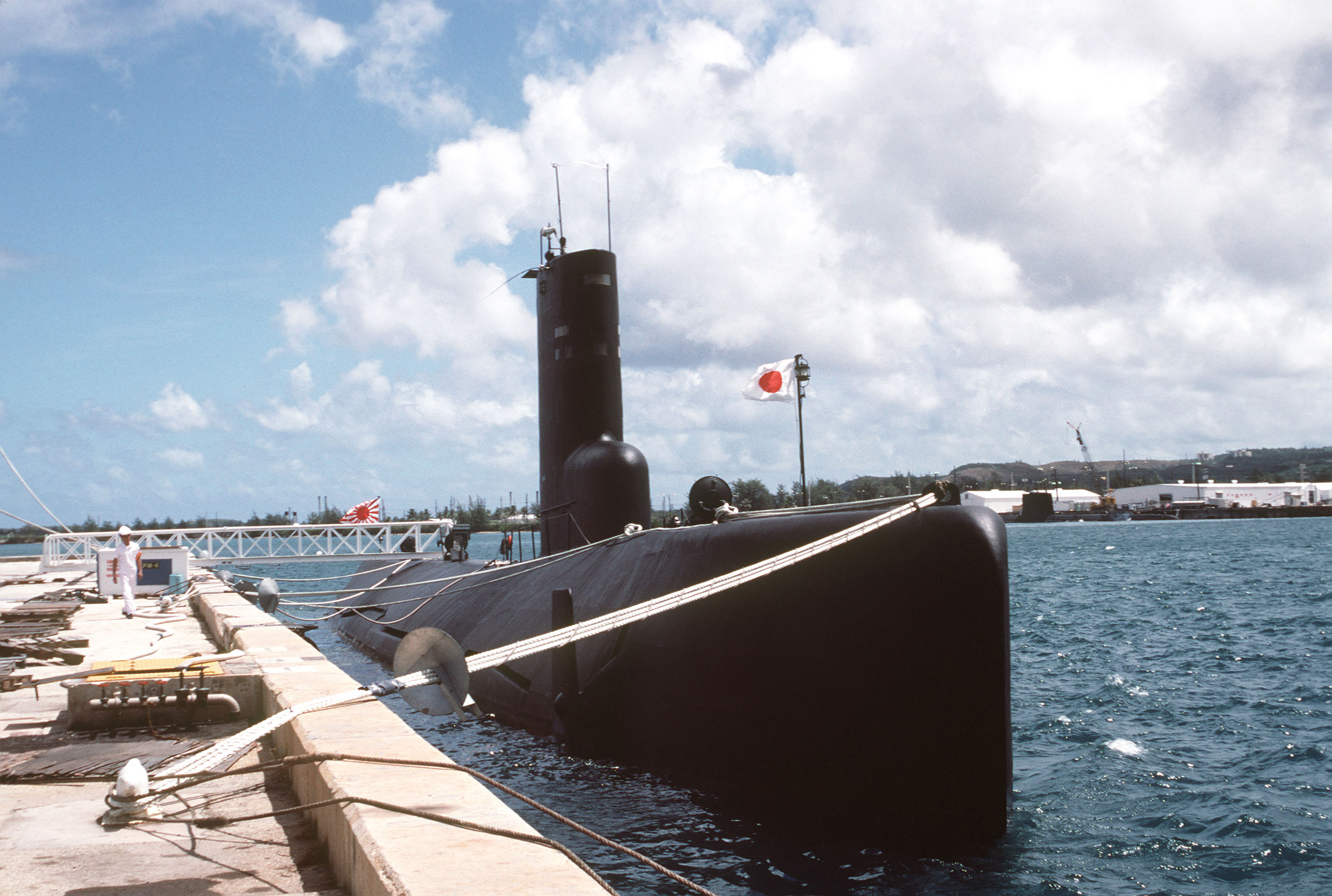
- Arashio alongside in Apra Harbor on 1 April 1984

Class overview
- Name: Asashio class
- Builders: Kawasaki Shipbuilding Corporation, Mitsubishi Heavy Industries
- Operators: Japan Maritime Self-Defense Force
- Preceded by: Ōshio class
- Succeeded by: Uzushio class
- Built: 1964−1969
- In commission: 1966−1986
- Planned: 4
- Completed: 4
- Retired: 4

General characteristics
- Type: Submarine
- Displacement: 1,650 long tons (1,680 t) surfaced; 2,150 long tons (2,180 t) submerged
- Length: 88 m (288 ft 9 in)
- Beam: 8.2 m (26 ft 11 in)
- Draft: 4.9 m (16 ft 1 in)
- Propulsion: Kawasaki Diesel-electric, 2 shafts; 2,900 bhp (2,200 kW) (surfaced); 6,300 shp (4,700 kW) (submerged)
- Speed: 14 knots (26 km/h; 16 mph) surfaced; 18 knots (33 km/h; 21 mph) submerged
- Complement: 80
- Armament: 6 × bow 533 mm (21 in) torpedo tubes; 2 × stern 320 mm (12.7 in) torpedo tubes

The Asashio-class submarine is a submarine class of Japanese Maritime Self-Defense Force comprising four boats. This class is the successor of Ōshio. The class were the first fleet submarines constructed for post-war Japan. The first submarine was authorized as part of the 1963 shipbuilding programme. Their design improved on previous Japanese classes by being larger to obtain better seaworthiness with greater torpedo stowage. The class entered service in the late 1960s and remained as such until the mid-1980s when they were taken out of service.

== Design and description ==
Based on the preceding Ōshio, the Asashio class were of similar design but with a different shaped bow and improved sonar. They are considered the first fleet submarines constructed for Japan in the post-World War II era. The submarines, constructed with a double hull, measured 88 meters (288 ft 9 in) long with a beam of 8.2 m (26 ft 11 in) and a draft of 4.9 m (16 ft 1 in). The vessels had a standard displacement of 1,650 long tons (1,680 t) surfaced and a submerged displacement of 2,150 long tons (2,180 t). The Asashio class had a complement of 80. The Asashio class were propelled by two propellers powered by a diesel-electric system comprising two Kawasaki diesel engines creating 2,900 brake horsepower (2,200 kW) and two electric motors creating 6,300 shaft horsepower (4,700 kW). This gave the submarines a maximum speed of 14 knots (26 km/h; 16 mph) submerged and 18 knots (33 km/h; 21 mph) while surfaced.

The vessels were equipped with eight torpedo tubes, six in the bow and two in the stern. The sources disagree on the torpedo armament, with two sources stating that all eight were for 533-millimeter (21.0 in) torpedoes, while another states that only the forward six were for the 533 mm torpedoes and the stern tubes were for 320 mm (12.7 in) torpedoes. Moore and Gardiner, Chumbley and Budzbon state that the stern tubes were for "swim-out" torpedoes with Gardiner, Chumbley and Budzbon adding they were for anti-submarine warfare (ASW) and that the forward tubes were intended for US Mark 54 torpedoes. This is erroneous because, aside from being of the wrong size and role, the Mark 54 entered service in 2004; the text must actually be referring to the Japanese-designed Type 54 torpedoes, and conflating them with the US Mark 37, of which one variant was locally manufactured in Japan, and other variants imported. They carried a total of 20 torpedoes. The Asahio class mounted ZPS-3 radar, SQS-4 active sonar and JQS-3A and JQQ-2A passive sonars. They were also equipped with BLR-1 intercept equipment.

== Boats ==
Asashio class construction data
Pennant no.	Name	Builder	Laid down	Launched	Commissioned	Fate
SS-562	Asashio (あさしお)	Kawasaki Shipbuilding Corporation	15 October 1964	27 November 1965	13 October 1966	Decommissioned 30 March 1983
SS-563	Harushio (はるしお)	Mitsubishi Heavy Industries	12 October 1965	25 February 1967	1 December 1967	Decommissioned 30 March 1984
SS-564	Michishio (みちしお)	Kawasaki Shipbuilding Corporation	26 July 1966	5 December 1967	29 August 1968	Decommissioned 27 March 1985
SS-565	Arashio (あらしお)	Mitsubishi Heavy Industries	5 July 1967	24 October 1968	25 July 1969	Decommissioned 27 March 1986

== Construction and career ==
The first submarine Asashio was ordered as part of the 1963 shipbuilding programme. Construction was split between the Kawasaki and Mitsubishi yards at Kobe. The submarines were used for ASW training for surface ships in naval exercises. The class was deleted in the mid-1980s.

== See also ==
Equivalent submarines of the same era

- Potvis class
- Sjöormen class
- Type 035
- Kalvari class
