= Brooke Marine =

British shipbuilding firm

Brooke Marine (also known as J.W. Brooke & Co. and Brooke Yachts) was a Lowestoft-based shipbuilding firm. The company constructed boats and small ships for civilian and commercial use, as well as minor warships for the Royal Navy, Royal Navy of Oman, Royal Australian Navy, Kenya Navy and United States Navy.

The company was founded in 1874 as a foundry by John Walter Brooke and expanded into boatbuilding and shipbuilding in the early 1900s. It operated until 1992.

== History ==
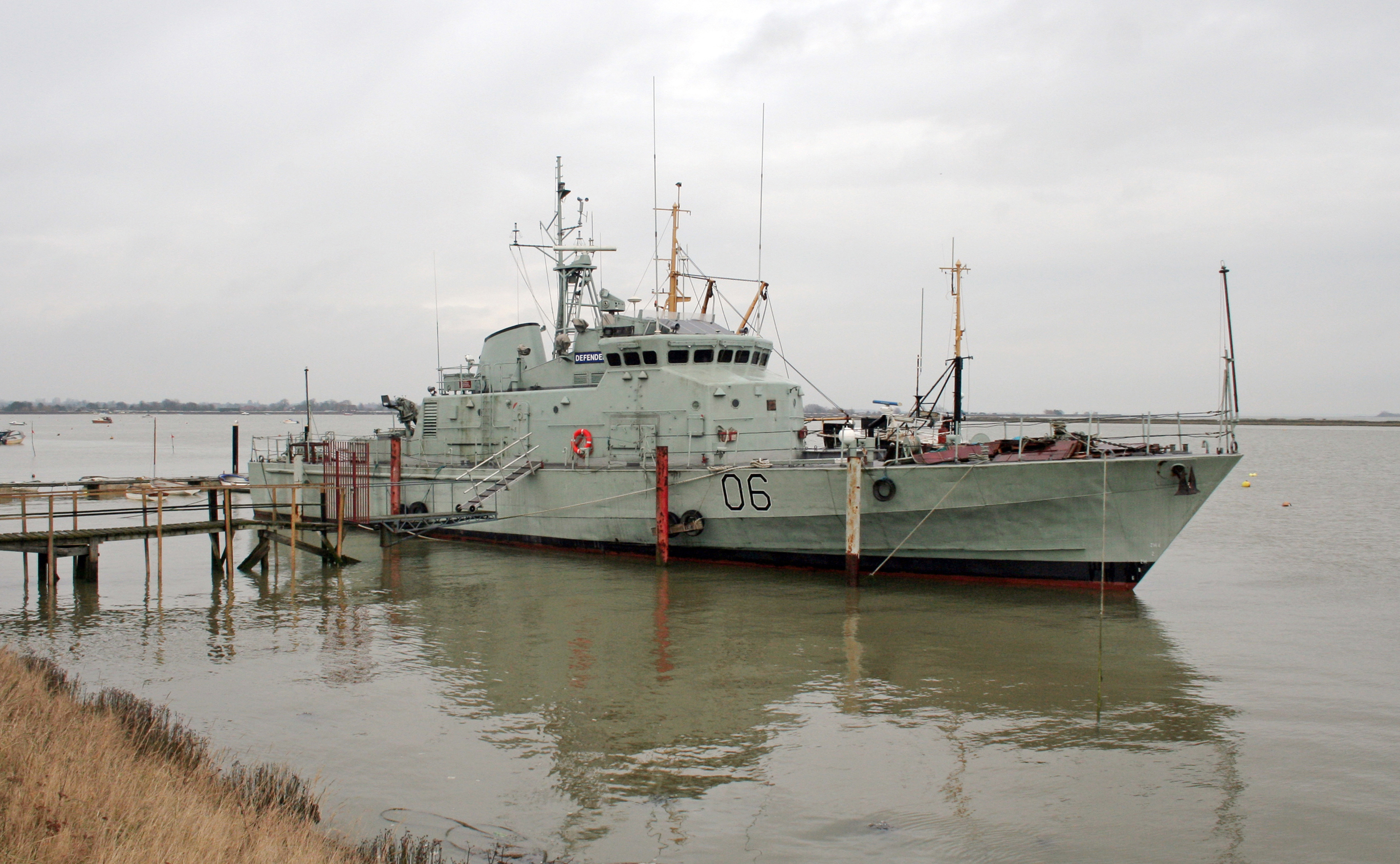
The Lowestoft Defender at Heybridge Basin. The fast attack craft was built by Brooke Marine in the 1970s for the Royal Navy of Oman.

Until 1911 the company, which produced engines and motor cars, sub-contracted its boat building operations to another firm in Oulton Broad. In 1911 it opened a shipyard on the north side of Lake Lothing and began to produce its own craft, all using engines produced at its Adrian Works in the town. Car production stopped in 1913, although the company continued producing engines until 1938, in total producing more than 7,000.

During World War I the company established a munitions factory. Following the war, the shipyard was expanded to produce boats up to 52 feet (16 m) in length. During World War II, the company produced and serviced Motor Launches and landing craft for the Royal Navy and other Allied forces. In 1940, the company was acquired by Harry Dowsett and renamed Brooke Marine.

In 1954, a new shipyard was built on the south side of Lake Lothing. The old yard was closed in 1955, and in 1975 was sold and levelled. The first ships produced at the new yard were twenty fishing trawlers ordered by the Russian government. Over 300 craft were eventually produced in the yard. In 1968 the company won the Queen's Award to Industry for Export Achievement.

In July 1977 the company was nationalised and became part of British Shipbuilders until a management buy-out in 1985. In 1987, Brooke Marine closed down and was put up for sale. The dockyard and facilities were purchased in May, with the new owners trading under the name Brooke Yachts. The company continued until September 1992, when it ceased trading. Receivers sold off all shipbuilding equipment in 1993.

The name and some assets of Brooke Marine were acquired in 2006 by Michael Fenton, who relaunched the business with many of the former employees. Brooke Marine Yachts Ltd traded until 2009. The shipyard was then purchased by an investment company which now leases many of the original buildings to a diverse range of businesses many of which are marine orientated.

=== Redevelopment Proposal ===
In October 2014, a planning application for Brook Peninsula & Jeld Wen submitted by Cardy Construction Ltd to Waveney District Council for a £150 million was granted consent development.

"Demolition of the existing industrial units and residential-led mixed use redevelopment for residential use (use class C3) of up to 850 dwellings or 950,000 sqft (whichever is the greater), up to 1774sqm commercial (use classes A1-A5), marina building (sui generis), 1.5 form entry primary school, and visitor centre (use class D1) for the County Wildlife Site; together with associated infrastructure including a new spine road access and open space" The master plan, designed by Assael Architecture, aims to create a new place to live, work and visit building on its unique location between the North Sea and the Broads.

== Ships built by Brooke Marine ==
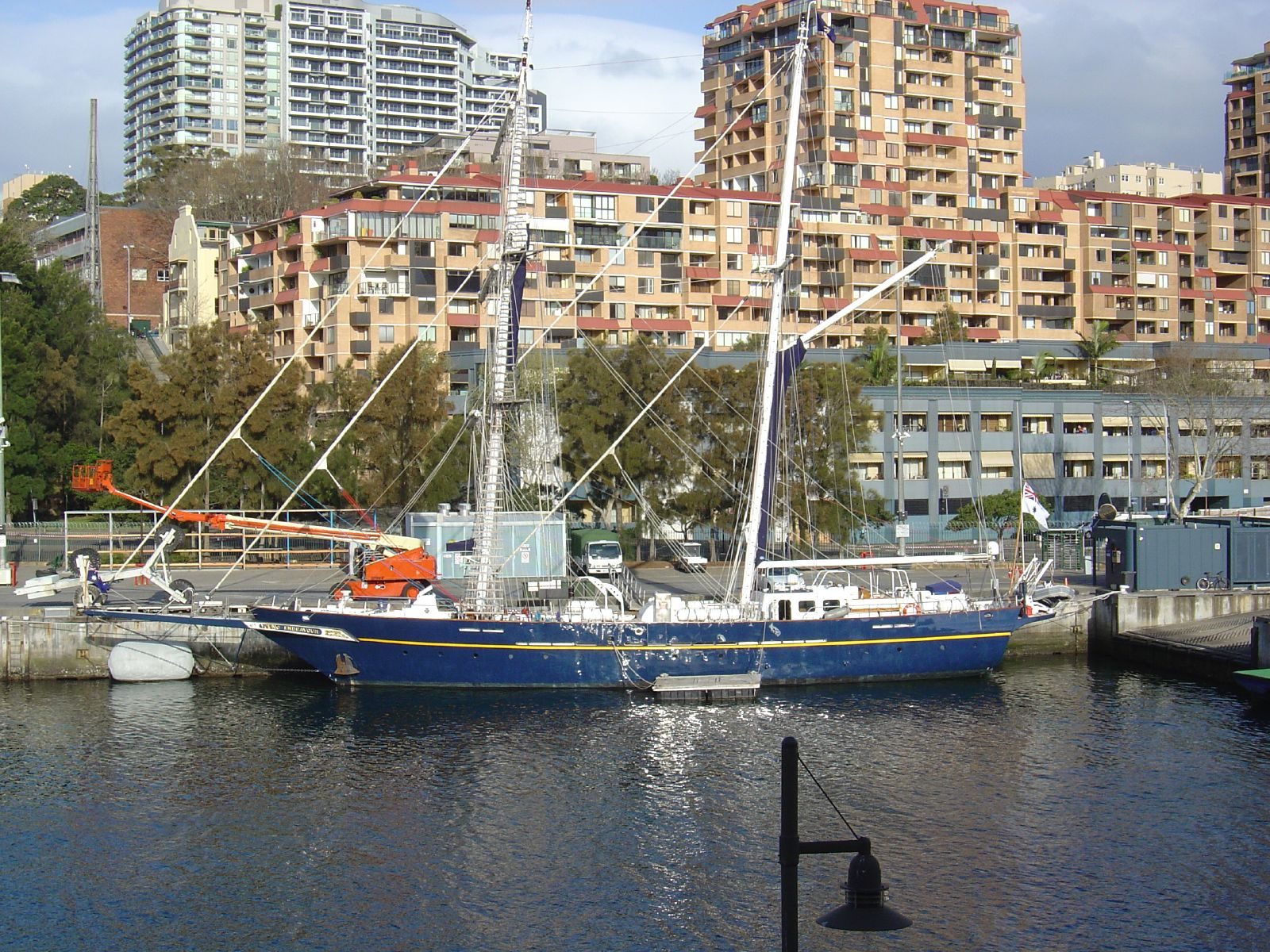
STS Young Endeavour in 2007

Most craft produced by the company were steel, ranging in size from 20 to 93 metres. In 1964–65, the shipyard built 4 patrol crafts for the Pakistan Navy namely PN Ships Sylhet, Jessore, Comilla and Rajshahi. During the Bangladesh Liberation War all but Rajshahi was sunk with Rajshahi escaping from the then East Pakistan to West Pakistan, via Penang, Malaysia. Jessore was later salvaged and, after refurbishment, was commissioned into the Bangladesh Navy as BNS Bishkhali. Other notable vessels include the Virgin Atlantic Challenger II and the first Al Said, the former royal yacht and flagship of the Oman navy. The Mincarlo, a trawler, is a floating museum based in the Port of Lowestoft for much of the year. The sail training ship Young Endeavor was begun by Brooke Marine before being completed by Brooke Yachts. It was a gift from the U.K. to Australia to celebrate the bicentenary of that country in 1988.

Brooke Marine built the seaplane tenders Zeta (1940) and Tristan (1949) as well as the flying boat refueller Lindsey 2111. All three craft are in the National Historic Ships register.

Brook Marine also built the deep-sea factory fishing vessel Gaul which was a based at Hull. Gaul was built in 1972 for the Ranger Fishing company and registered at North Shields as Ranger Castor, SN18, later being renamed when Ranger Fishing was bought by British United Trawlers and re-registered as Gaul, H243. She sank some time on the night of 8–9 February 1974 in storm conditions in the Barents Sea with all 36 crew lost.
