= Japanese destroyer Shimakaze =

Three warships of Japan have borne the name Shimakaze (島風, "island wind"):

- Japanese destroyer Shimakaze (1920), a Minekaze-class destroyer launched in 1920, renamed Patrol Boat No.1 in 1940 and sunk in 1943.
- Japanese destroyer Shimakaze (1942), a one-off World War II period super-destroyer launched in 1942 and sunk in 1944
- JS Shimakaze (DDG-172), a Hatakaze-class guided missile destroyer commissioned in 1988 and operated by the Japan Maritime Self-Defense Force (JMSDF).

== See also ==
- Shimakaze (CL-59), a Suzukaze-class patrol boat operated by the Japan Coast Guard (JCG).
- Super Shimakaze-class destroyer, a projected class of destroyers that was cancelled in 1942.
