= Japanese destroyer Hatakaze =

Three Japanese destroyers have been named Hatakaze (the Japanese word for "flag wind"):

- Japanese destroyer Hatakaze (1924), a Kamikaze-class destroyer (1922) of the Imperial Japanese Navy during World War II
- JDS Hatakaze (DD-182), an Asakaze-class destroyer of the Japan Maritime Self-Defense Force, launched in 1954 and deleted in 1969, formerly USS Macomb (DD-458).
- JS Hatakaze (DDG-171), lead ship of the Hatakaze class

== See also ==
- Hatakaze-class destroyer, a class of four destroyers of the Japanese Maritime Self-Defense Force in 1984.
