= Japanese destroyer Minegumo =

At least two warships of Japan have been named Minegumo:

- Japanese destroyer Minegumo (1937), an Asashio-class destroyer launched in 1937 and sunk in 1943.
- JDS Minegumo, a Minegumo-class destroyer launched in 1967 and struck in 1999.
