= Akizuki-class destroyer =

Akizuki-class destroyer may refer to:

- Akizuki-class destroyer (1942), the "Type B Destroyer" used by the Imperial Japanese Navy during World War II
- Super Akizuki-class destroyer, a developed version of the 1942 class
- Akizuki-class destroyer (1959), a Cold War era destroyer used by the Japanese Maritime Self-Defense Force for anti-submarine warfare.
- Akizuki-class destroyer (2010), a class of escort destroyers of the Japanese Maritime Self-Defense Force
