= JDS Murakumo =

Minegumo-class destroyer

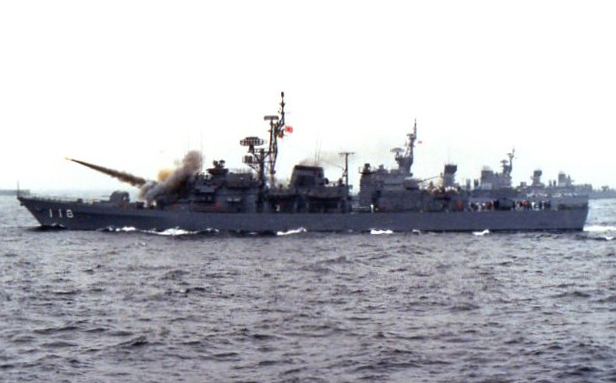
- JDS Murakumo

History

Japan
- Name: Murakumo; (むらくも)
- Namesake: Murakumo (1928)
- Ordered: 1967
- Builder: Hitachi, Osaka
- Laid down: 19 October 1968
- Launched: 15 November 1969
- Commissioned: 21 August 1970
- Decommissioned: 18 June 2000
- Reclassified: TV-3511
- Home port: Kure
- Identification: Pennant number: DD-118
- Fate: Scrapped

General characteristics
- Class & type: Minegumo-class destroyer
- Displacement: 2,150 long tons (2,185 t) standard; 2,750 long tons (2,794 t) full load
- Length: 115 m (377 ft 4 in)
- Beam: 11.8 m (38 ft 9 in)
- Draft: 3.8 m (12 ft 6 in)
- Complement: 210
- Sensors & processing systems: OPS-11B EWR; OPS-17 surface search radar; OQS-3 hull-sonar; SQS-35 variable depth sonar
- Electronic warfare & decoys: NOLR-1B electronic warfare suite
- Armament: 2 × Mk.33 twin 3"/50 caliber guns; 1 × OTO Melara 76 mm; 1 × Bofors 375 mm (15 in) ASW rocket launcher; 2 × HOS-301 triple 324 mm (12.8 in) torpedo tubes
- Aircraft carried: 2 × QH-50D DASH anti-submarine drone helicopter (removed in 1979-82 and ASROC fitted)

JDS Murakumo (DD-118) was the third ship of Minegumo-class destroyers.

== Construction and career ==
Murakumo was laid down at Hitachi Zosen Corporation Osaka Shipyard on 19 October 1968 and launched on 15 November 1969. She was commissioned on 21 August 1970. The stern of this ship was extended by 1 m, the standard displacement increased by 50 tons, VDS (Variable Depth Sonar) was installed from the time of new construction, and an upper command post was newly established on the bridge.

During a specific repair in 1975, she removed her rear Mk-63 fire control system and installed a domestic fire control system type 2 and completed it in October. She then conducted a maritime test of the fire control system.

Special refurbishment work was carried out between September 27, 1978 and March 30, 1979, the DASH Gyrodyne on the rear deck was removed, and an ASROC launcher was installed. In addition, the rear 3-inch gun was removed and replaced with a 62-caliber 76 mm single-armed rapid-fire gun manufactured by Oto Melara. Since the gun was decided to be used as the main gun of the new Maritime Self-Defense Force escort ship, it was purchased and installed on the ship for preliminary testing. Since then, a 76mm gun test has been conducted along with a functional test of the fire control system Type 2.

On March 27, 1982, the 22nd Escort Corps was reorganized into the 2nd Escort Corps.

On March 27, 1985, she became the flagship of the 3rd Escort Fleet and her fixed port was transferred to Yokosuka. New installation and remodeling of command and control related equipment will be carried out.

On March 16, 1998, she was reclassified as a training vessel and her registration number changed to TV-3511.

She was transferred to Training Squadron 1st Training Squadron, and her home port was transferred to Kure again. The remodeling work for her training vessel was carried out from February 9 to April 24, the ASROC vault was removed, and a trainee auditorium was newly established.

She was removed on June 13, 2000. Her total distance reached 620,329 nautical miles.
