= JS Shimakaze =

Hatakaze-class guided missile destroyer

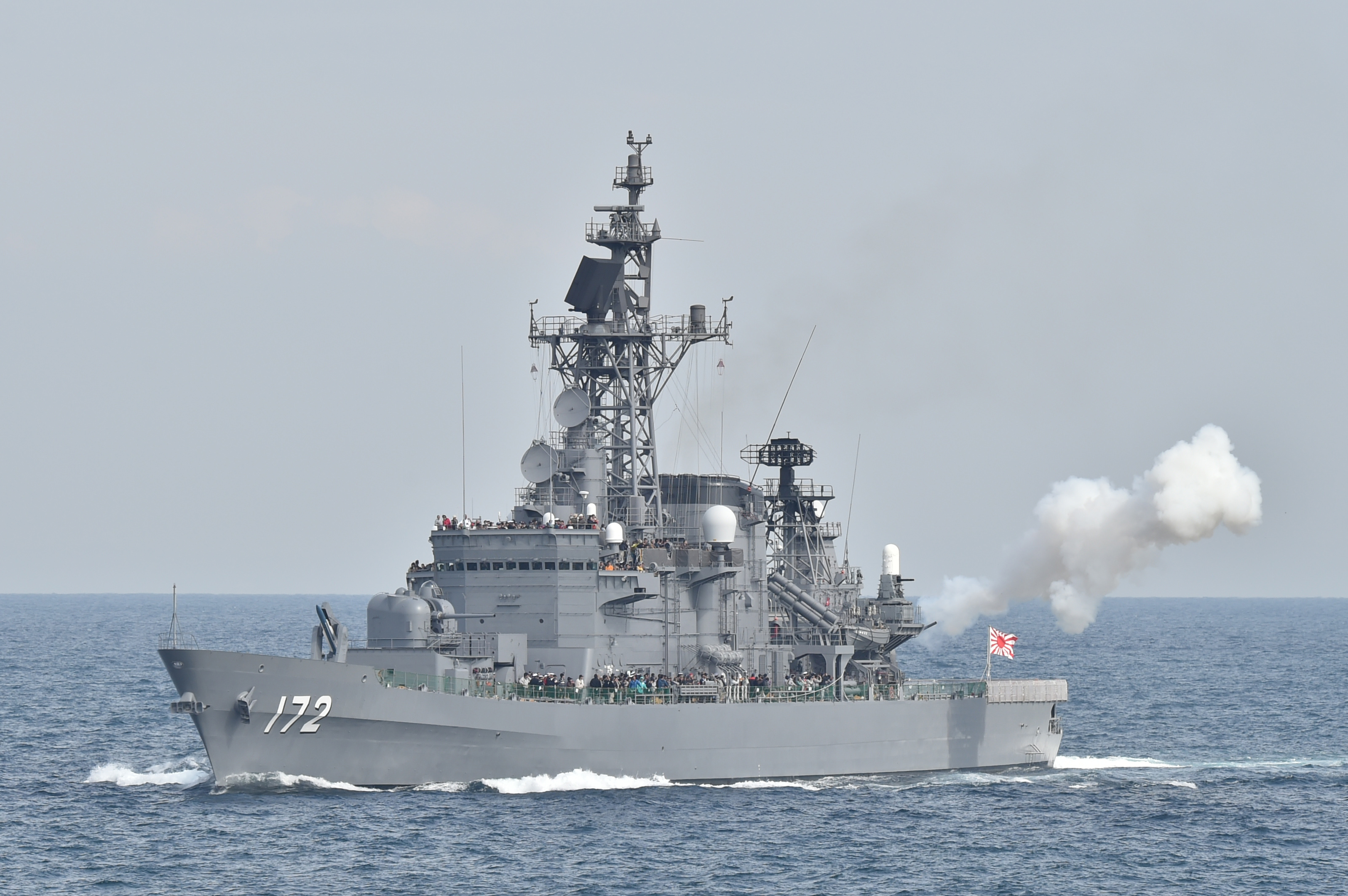
- JS Shimakaze (DDG-172) firing in a gunnery exercise on 21 December 2015

History

Japan
- Name: Shimakaze; (しまかぜ)
- Namesake: Shimakaze (1942)
- Builder: Mitsubishi, Nagasaki
- Laid down: 13 January 1985
- Launched: 30 January 1987
- Commissioned: 23 March 1988
- Reclassified: Training vessel, 19 March 2021
- Home port: Kure
- Identification: MMSI number: 431999525; Hull number: TV-3521
- Status: Active

General characteristics
- Class & type: Hatakaze-class destroyer
- Displacement: 4674 tons standard; 6096 tons full load
- Length: 492.1 ft (150.0 m)
- Beam: 53.9 ft (16.4 m)
- Draft: 15.8 ft (4.8 m)
- Propulsion: 2 × Kawasaki/Rolls-Royce Spey SM1A gas turbines; 2 × Rolls-Royce Olympus gas turbines; 2 × shafts; 72,000 shp (54,000 kW)
- Speed: 30 knots (56 km/h; 35 mph)
- Complement: 260
- Sensors & processing systems: AN/SPS-52 air-search radar; OPS-11C air-search radar
- Armament: 2 × 5 in (130 mm) 54 caliber Mark 42 deck gun; 8 × Harpoon ship-to-ship missiles; 1 × SM-1MR Mk13 Mod4 ship-to-air missile launcher; 1 × ASROC Mk112 octuple launcher (anti submarine); 2 × 20mm Phalanx CIWS; 2 × Type 68 triple torpedo tubes
- Aviation facilities: 1 × SH-60K helicopter

JS Shimakaze (DDG-172/TV-3521) is the second ship of the Hatakaze-class guided missile destroyers built for the Japan Maritime Self-Defense Force (JMSDF). The ship was reclassified as a training ship in 2021.

== Construction and career ==
Shimakaze was laid down on the 13 January 1985 at Mitsubishi Heavy Industries shipyard in Nagasaki. She was launched on 30 January 1987 and commissioned on 23 March 1988.

On 23 November 2017, Shimakaze, along with JS Kaga, Ise, Teruzuki, and Samidare, participated in the search and rescue of a crashed C-2A Greyhound from the United States Navy 7th Fleet.

HMCS Ottawa, JS Chōkai, and Shimakaze participated in a bilateral exercise between the Royal Canadian Navy and the JMSDF on 16 October 2019.

On 30 March 2020, Shimakaze was damaged in a collision with a Chinese fishing vessel in the East China Sea.

Shimakaze was converted to a training ship and redesignated as TV-3521 on 19 March 2021.

== See also ==
- List of active Japan Maritime Self-Defense Force ships
