= JDS Minegumo =

Minegumo-class destroyer

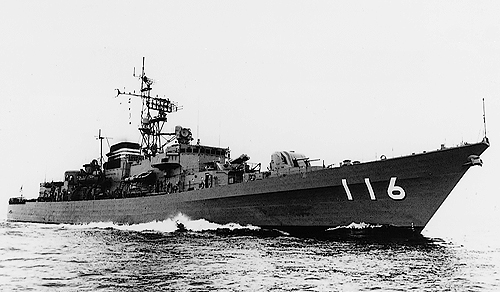
- JDS Minegumo

History

Japan
- Name: Minegumo; (みねぐも)
- Namesake: Minegumo (1937)
- Ordered: 1965
- Builder: Mitsui, Tamano
- Laid down: 14 March 1967
- Launched: 16 August 1967
- Commissioned: 31 August 1968
- Decommissioned: 18 March 1999
- Reclassified: TV-3509
- Home port: Kure
- Identification: Pennant number: DD-116
- Fate: Scrapped

General characteristics
- Class & type: Minegumo-class destroyer
- Displacement: 2,100 long tons (2,134 t) standard; 2,750 long tons (2,794 t) full load
- Length: 115 m (377 ft 4 in)
- Beam: 11.8 m (38 ft 9 in)
- Draft: 3.8 m (12 ft 6 in)
- Complement: 210
- Sensors & processing systems: OPS-11B EWR; OPS-17 surface search radar; OQS-3 hull-sonar; SQS-35 variable depth sonar
- Electronic warfare & decoys: NOLR-1B electronic warfare suite
- Armament: 2 × Mk.33 twin 3"/50 caliber guns; 1 × Bofors 375 mm (15 in) ASW rocket launcher; 2 × HOS-301 triple 324 mm (12.8 in) torpedo tubes; 1 × 8 ASROC (installed 1979-1982 after QH-50D DASH was removed)
- Aircraft carried: 2 × QH-50D DASH anti-submarine drone helicopter (removed in 1979-82 and ASROC fitted)

JDS Minegumo (DD-116) was the lead ship of Minegumo-class destroyers.

== Construction and career ==
Minegumo was laid down at Mitsui Engineering & Shipbuilding Tamano Shipyard on 14 March 1967 and launched on 16 August 1967. She was commissioned on 31 August 1968.

Special refurbishment work was carried out between November 24, 1981 and May 12, 1982, the DASH QH-50D on the rear deck was removed, and an ASROC launcher was installed.

On March 27, 1982, the 22nd Escort Fleet was reorganized under the 2nd Escort Group.

On March 19, 1986, the 22nd Escort Corps was reorganized under the Kure District Force.

Around 8:30 am on June 11, 1995, a fire broke out in the machine room during a test voyage at the Kii Channel, killing one crew member and injuring two.

On August 1, the same year, the type was changed to a training ship, and the ship registration number was changed to TV-3509. Transferred to Training Squadron 1st Training Squadron.

Removed from the register on March 18, 1999. The total cruising distance was 674,753.1 nautical miles.
