= Mark 32 surface vessel torpedo tubes =

Mark 32 torpedo tubes

Mark 32 torpedo tubes
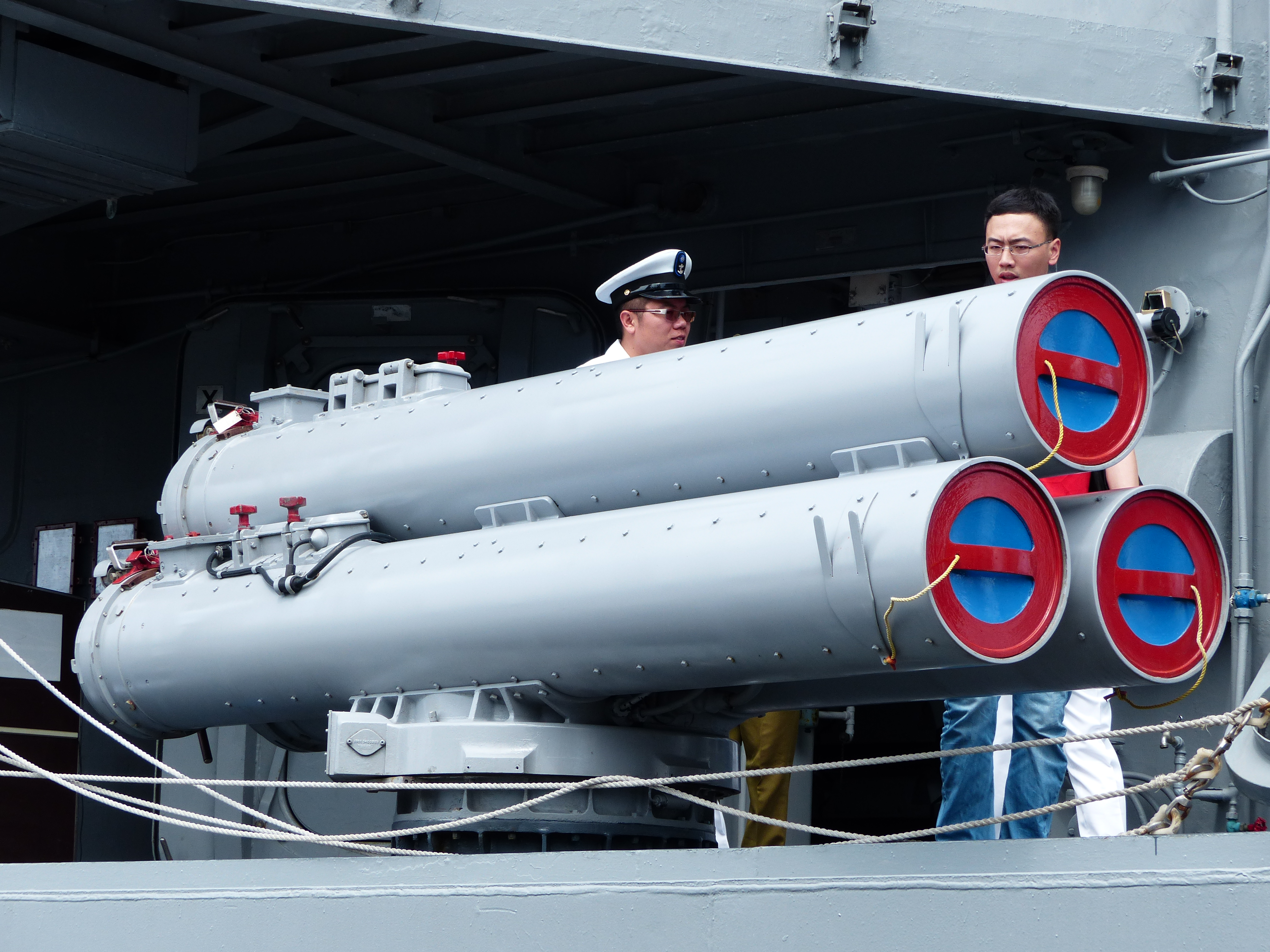
- Mark 32 torpedo tubes mounted on ROCS Tzu I
- Type: Torpedo tube
- Place of origin: United States

Service history
- In service: 1960–present
- Used by: United States Navy
- Wars: Cold War

Production history
- Manufacturer: Ordnance Technology Service
- Variants: Mod 5 Mod 7 Mod 9 Mod 11; Mod 14; Mod 15; Mod 17; Mod 19

Specifications
- Mass: 2,230 lb (1,010 kg)
- Launch platform: Surface vessel

Mark 32 surface vessel torpedo tubes (Mk 32 SVTT) is a torpedo launching system designed for the United States Navy.

== History ==
The Mark 32 has been the standard anti-submarine torpedo launching system aboard United States Navy surface vessels since its introduction in 1960, and is in use aboard the warships of several other navies.

During the FRAM Program, Fletcher, Allen M. Sumner and Gearing-class destroyers were modernized and fitted with two Mark 32 torpedo tubes on each side of their midship. The torpedo tubes' service extended to multiple other countries such as Mexico, South Korea, Taiwan, Turkey, Egypt and many more due to the fact that decommissioned American ships were bought or transferred over to them throughout the years, notably Oliver Hazard Perry-class frigates.

Japan uses the HOS-301 torpedo tubes which are redesignated version of the Mark 32.

=== Design ===
Most versions (referred to as modifications or mods) are triple-tube sets that can be rotated or trained to face a target. The exception is the Mod 9 sets, which only have two tubes and are fixed in position. The Mark 32 can fire 12.75-inch (324 mm) torpedoes of the Mark 44, Mark 46, Mark 50 (from the Mod 17 tubes onwards), and Mark 54 designs, and can be modified to use other torpedoes (such as the MU90 Impact aboard Royal Australian Navy frigates, or Royal Navy units using Sting Ray torpedoes). The tubes are designed to be fired remotely, but manual firing controls are fitted as a backup to all but the Spruance-class destroyer's Mod 15 sets, as all aspects of the tubes' operation are controlled remotely. The launch is powered by compressed air in a rear flask, which doubles as each tube's breech, and the torpedoes are fire-and-forget weapons.

The launcher can be made from fibreglass, or with a fibreglass liner encased in metal. The tubes were designed to be weatherproof and capable of storing torpedoes for long periods, but this is only practical with regular maintenance. Each triple-tube set weighs around 2,230 pounds (1,010 kg) unloaded, with variations between mods.

== Variants ==
- Mk 32 Mod 5 and 7: three-barrel variant designed for the Mark 44 and Mark 46 torpedoes
- Mk 32 Mod 9: two-barrel variant
- Mk 32 Mod 11: single-barrel variant
- Mk 32 Mod 14: three-barrel variant able to fire locally or remotely
- Mk 32 Mod 15: three-barrel variant designed for the Mark 46 and Mark 54 torpedoes able to fire locally or remotely
- Mk 32 Mod 17: three-barrel variant
- Mk 32 Mod 19: three-barrel variant

=== On board ships ===
==== United States ====
- Fletcher-class destroyer
- Allen M. Sumner-class destroyer
- Gearing-class destroyer
- Mitscher-class destroyer
- Forrest Sherman-class destroyer
- Farragut-class destroyer
- Charles F. Adams-class destroyer
- Spruance-class destroyer
- Kidd-class destroyer
- Arleigh Burke-class destroyer
- Claud Jones-class destroyer escort
- Knox-class frigate
- Oliver Hazard Perry-class frigate

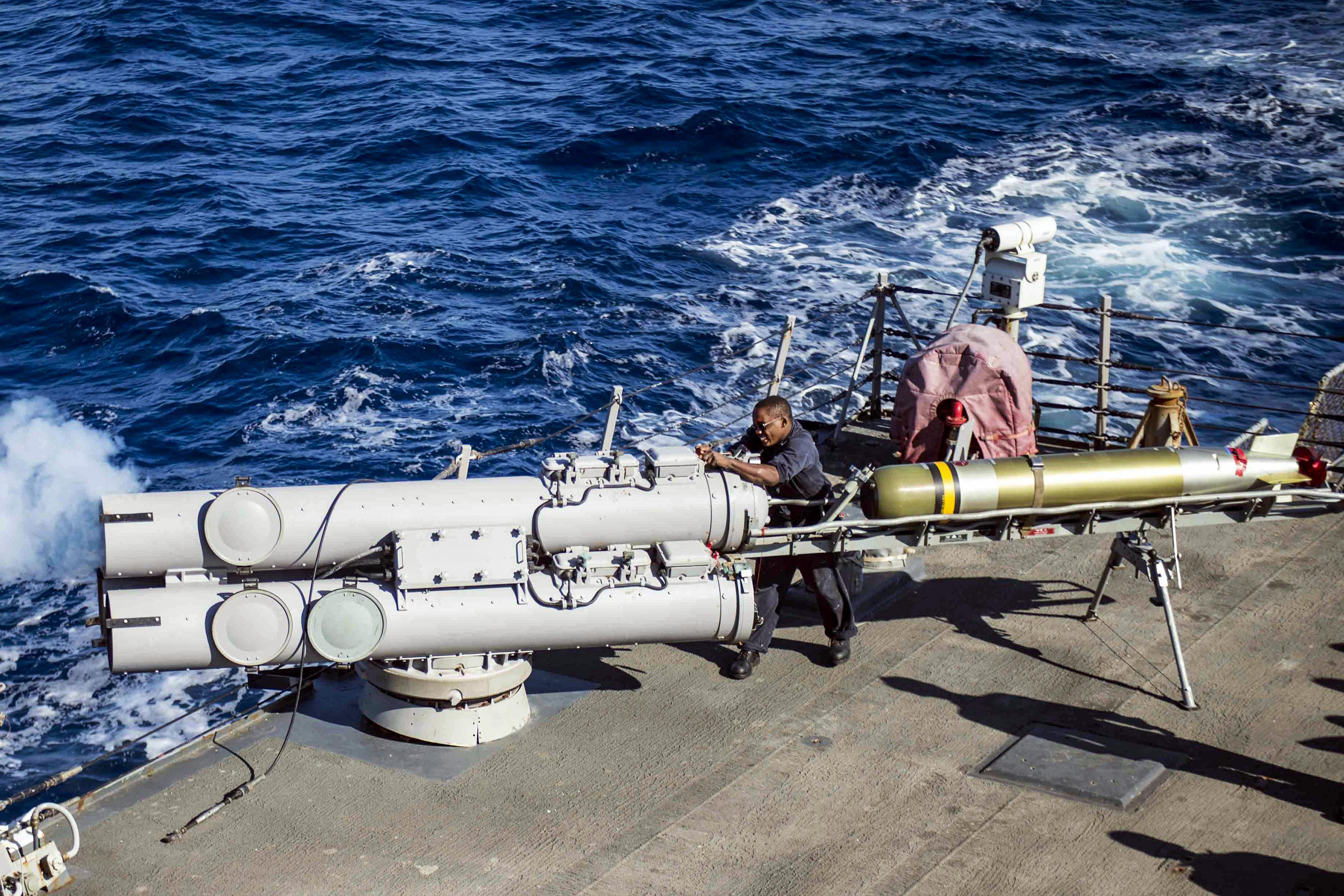
Mark 32 aboard USS Stout

- Long Beach-class cruiser
- Leahy-class cruiser
- Bainbridge-class cruiser
- Belknap-class cruiser
- Truxtun-class cruiser
- California-class cruiser
- Virginia-class cruiser
- Ticonderoga-class cruiser
- Hamilton-class cutter
- Treasury-class cutter

==== Japan ====
- Tachikaze-class destroyer
- Hatakaze-class destroyer
- Ayanami-class destroyer
- Akizuki-class destroyer (1959)

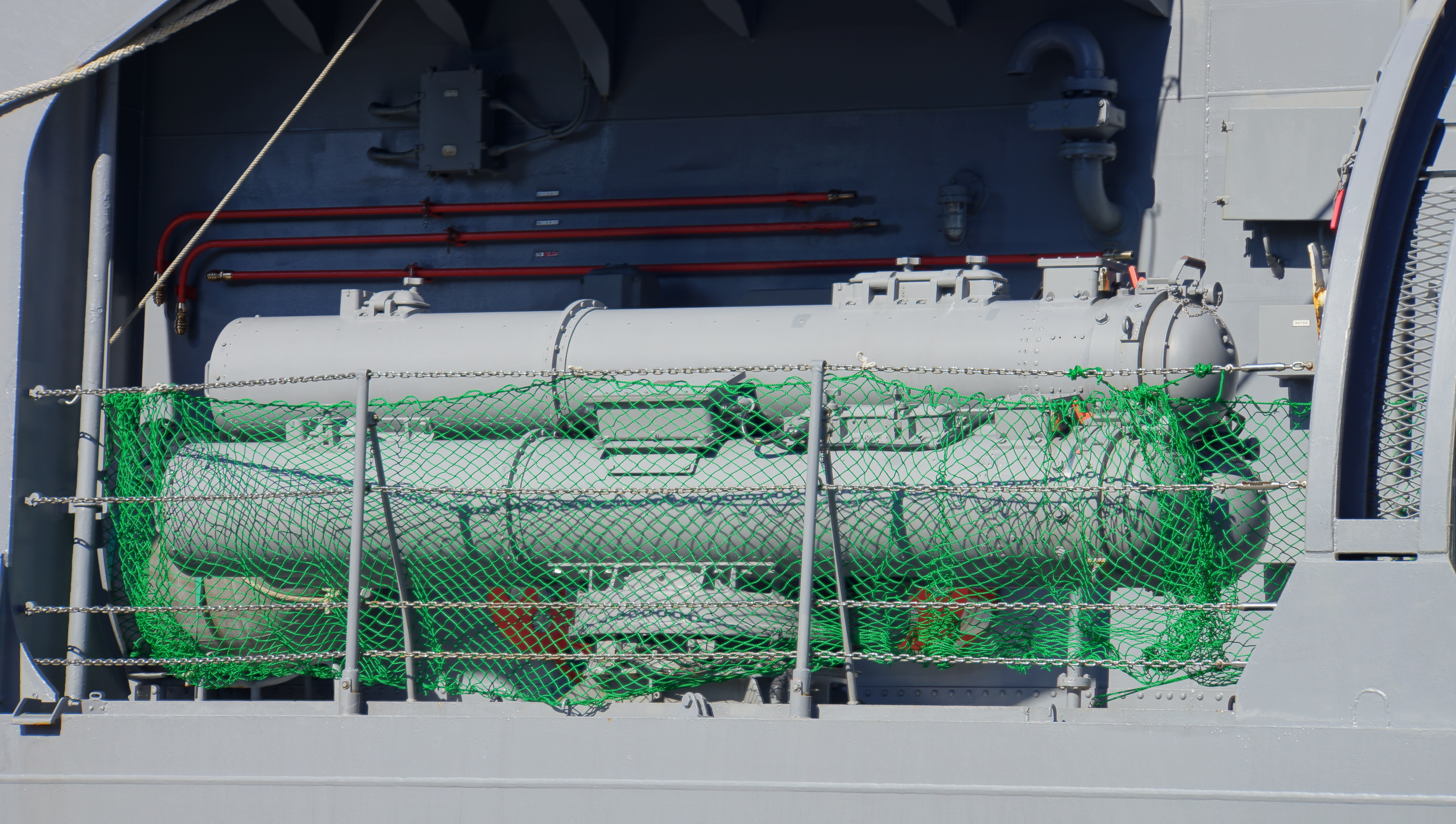
HOS-301 onboard JS Hatakaze

- Yamagumo-class destroyer
- Takatsuki-class destroyer
- Minegumo-class destroyer
- Hatsuyuki-class destroyer
- Asagiri-class destroyer
- Murasame-class destroyer
- Takanami-class destroyer
- Kongō-class destroyer
- Atago-class destroyer
- Maya-class destroyer
- Akizuki-class destroyer (2010)
- Asahi-class destroyer
- Isuzu-class destroyer escort
- Chikugo-class destroyer escort
- Ishikari-class destroyer escort
- Yūbari-class destroyer escort
- Abukuma-class destroyer escort
- Kashima-class training ship
- Asuka-class experimental ship

==== Canada ====
- St. Laurent-class destroyer
- Restigouche-class destroyer
- Mackenzie-class destroyer
- Annapolis-class destroyer
- Iroquois-class destroyer
- Halifax-class frigate

==== (Taiwan) Republic of China ====
- Kee Lung-class destroyer
- Chi Yang-class frigate
- Cheng Kung-class frigate
- Kang Ding-class frigate

==== Italy ====
- Audace-class destroyer
- Durand de la Penne-class destroyer
- Centauro-class frigate
- Bergamini-class frigate

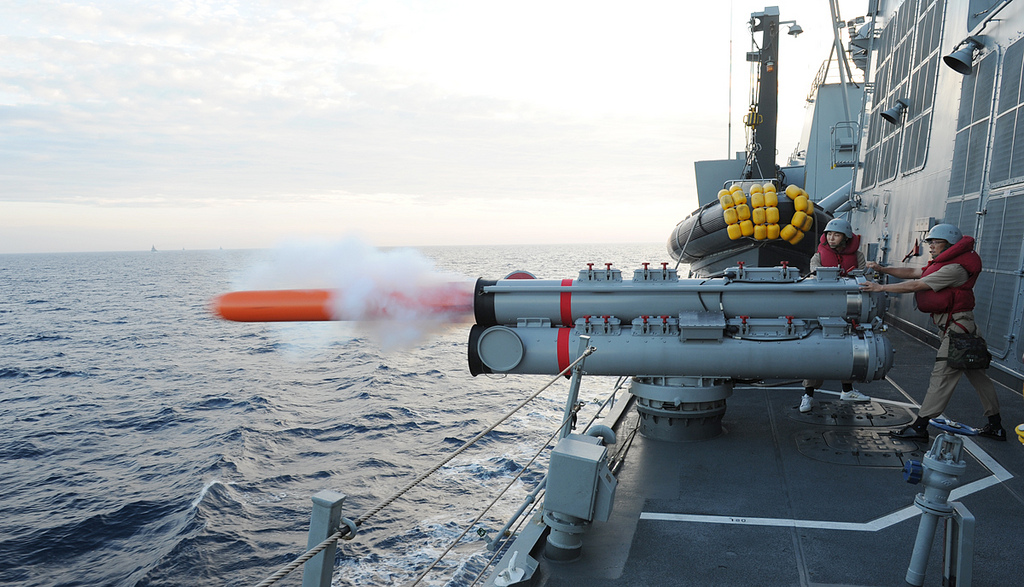
Mark 32 in South Korean service

- Alpino-class frigate
- Lupo-class frigate
- Maestrale-class frigate
- Albatros-class corvette

==== Australia ====
- Hobart-class destroyer

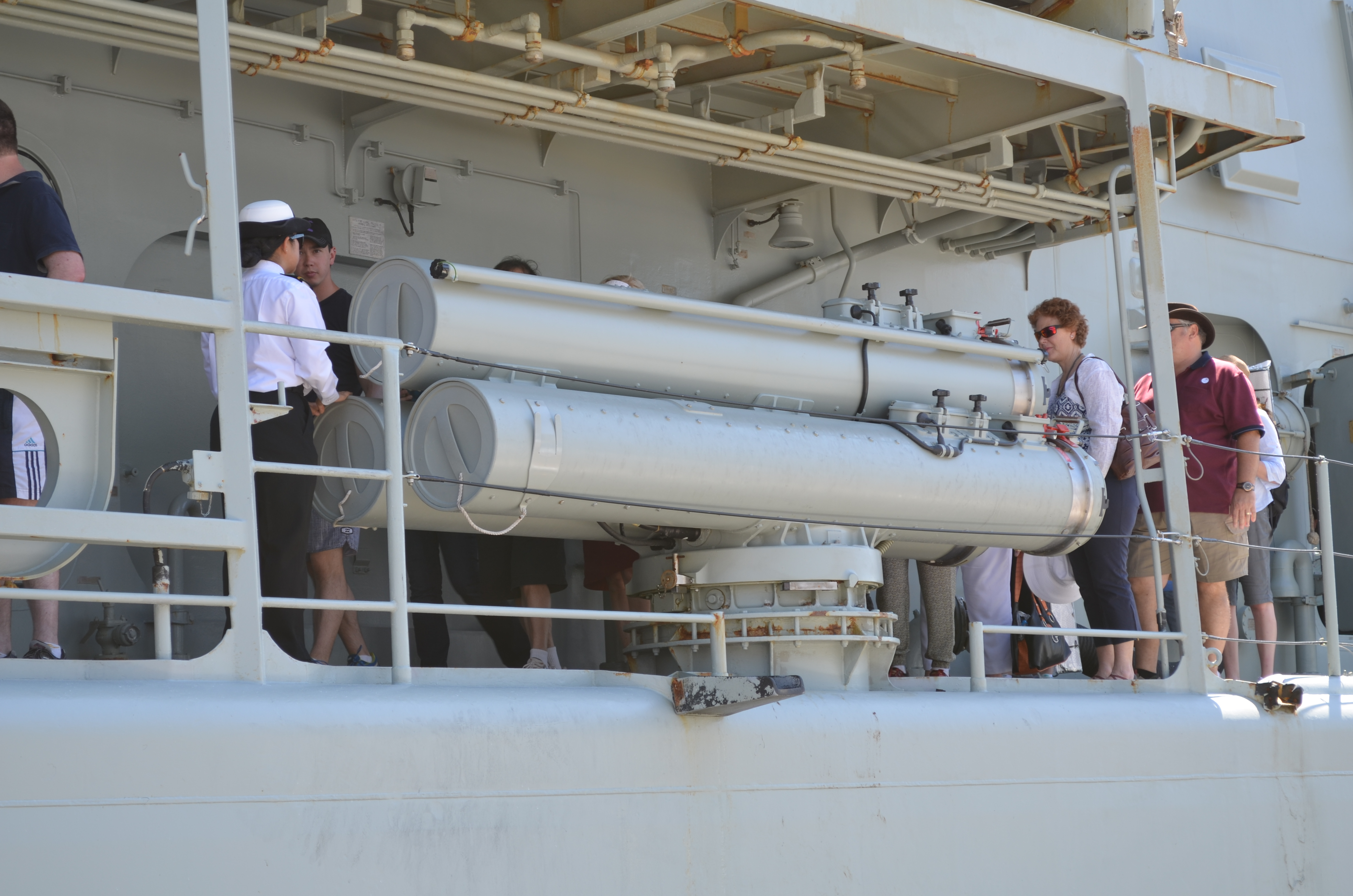
Mark 32 aboard HMAS Parramatta

- Anzac-class frigate
- South Korea
- Ulsan-class frigate
- Donghae-class corvette
- Pohang-class corvette
- Gwanggaeto the Great-class destroyer
- Chungmugong Yi Sun-sin-class destroyer
- Sejong the Great-class destroyer
- Incheon-class frigate
- Daegu-class frigate

==== Indonesia ====
- Claud Jones-class destroyer escort
- Ahmad Yani-class frigate
- Fatahillah-class corvette

==== Pakistan ====
- Babur-class corvette

== See also ==
- List of naval weapon systems
