= OPS-11 =

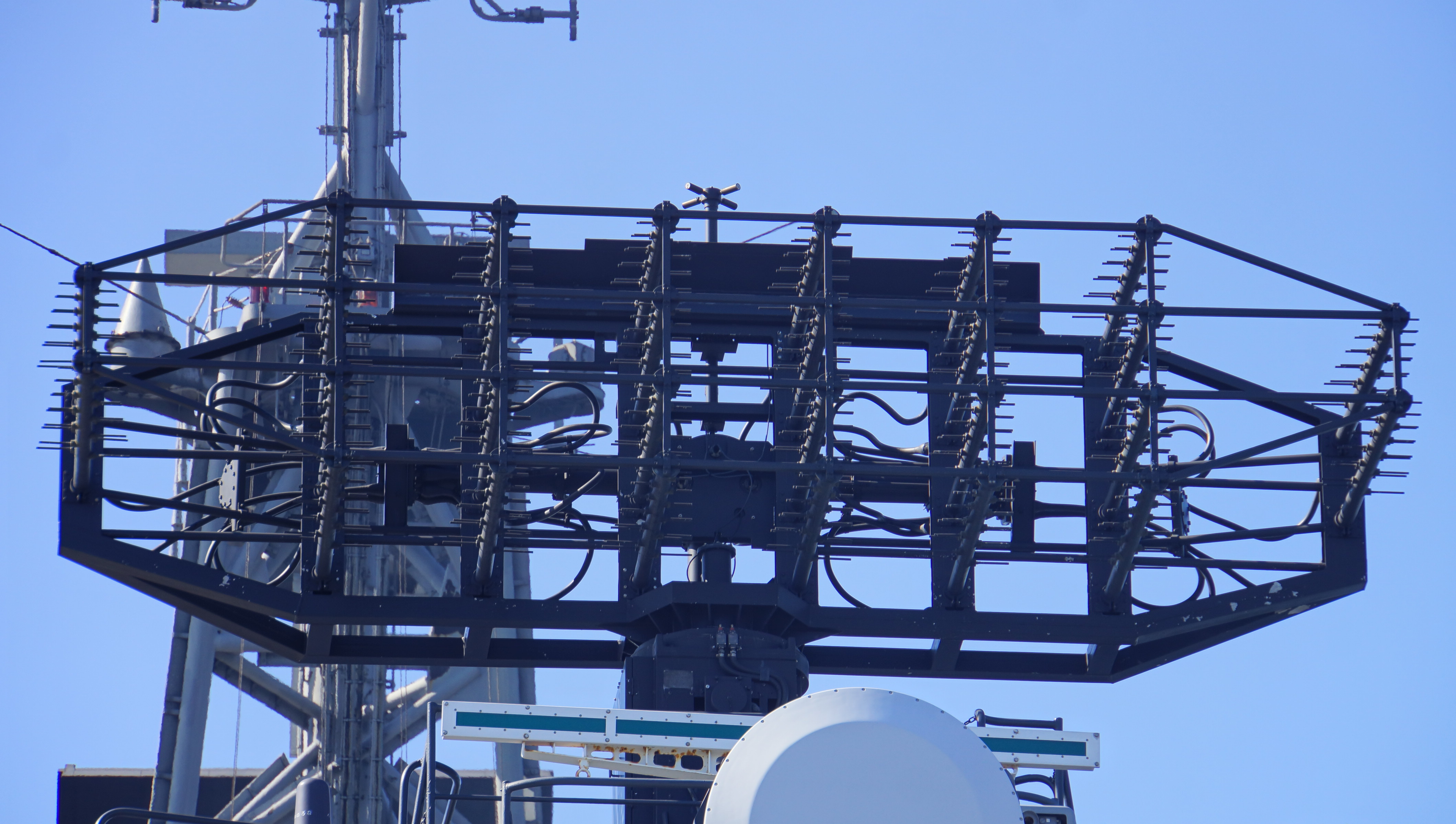
- OPS-11C aboard JS Hatakaze
- Country of origin: Japan
- Manufacturer: Mitsubishi Electric
- Introduced: 1966
- Type: 2D
- Frequency: B band
- Range: 350 ~ 450 km (190 ~ 240 nmi)

OPS-11 is a two-dimensional radar manufactured by Mitsubishi Electric. It is installed as an anti-aircraft search radar on the Maritime Self-Defense Force's escort ship, and it was the first model originally developed by Japan after World War II for this purpose. Variations include OPS-11B and OPS-11C.

The model numbers of the Maritime Self-Defense Force's electronic devices, including this machine, are generally based on the naming rules for military electronic devices of the U.S. military. It is for radar mounted on surface vessels, for detection / distance direction measurement / search.

== Overview ==
In developing the radar since the prototype electric probe, it was planned to model the AN/SPS-40, which was planned to be provided by the United States for the JDS Wakaba (former Imperial Japanese Navy Matsu-class destroyer). However, due to the delay in the provision of the actual product, most of the actual development was done independently by the Japanese side. For this reason, the pulse compression technology that was originally planned to be introduced from AN/SPS-40 will be researched independently. The Maritime Self-Defense Force already had OPS-1 and OPS-2 as a domestic anti-aircraft search radar, but since these were de facto pirated versions based on the American-made AN/SPS-6. This model is the first anti-aircraft search radar after the war.

Initially, the antenna shape was planned to be a parabolic antenna similar to the prototype AN/SPS-40. However, due to the design of the Yamagumo-class destroyer, which was planned to be installed as a ship, it was found that the antennas of the AN/SPS-40 would come into contact with each other when the ships of the same type were moored in parallel. Many Yagi-style dipole arrays were arranged in a planar frame (28 in total: 4 vertical rows x 6 horizontal rows + 2 on the outermost side of each row). The antenna of the identification friend or foe (IFF) is mounted on top of it. The frequency used is considered to be ultra high frequency (UHF; P (B) band), similar to AN/SPS-40. There are three variations of OPS-11, OPS-11B, and OPS-11C. OPS-11B is an amplifier added to increase the output, and OPS-11C is solid-state based on OPS-11B and movement target indication (MTI). The technology was introduced to enhance the clutter suppression performance.

Since it has a longer wavelength and better reachability than the new OPS-14 that uses the L band, it will be installed on the Tartar System-equipped missile destroyer even after the introduction of the OPS-14, complementing the 3D radar.

== On board ships ==
=== Destroyers ===
- Yamagumo-class
- Minegumo-class
- Takatsuki-class
- Haruna-class
- Tachikaze-class
- Hatakaze-class

== Gallery ==
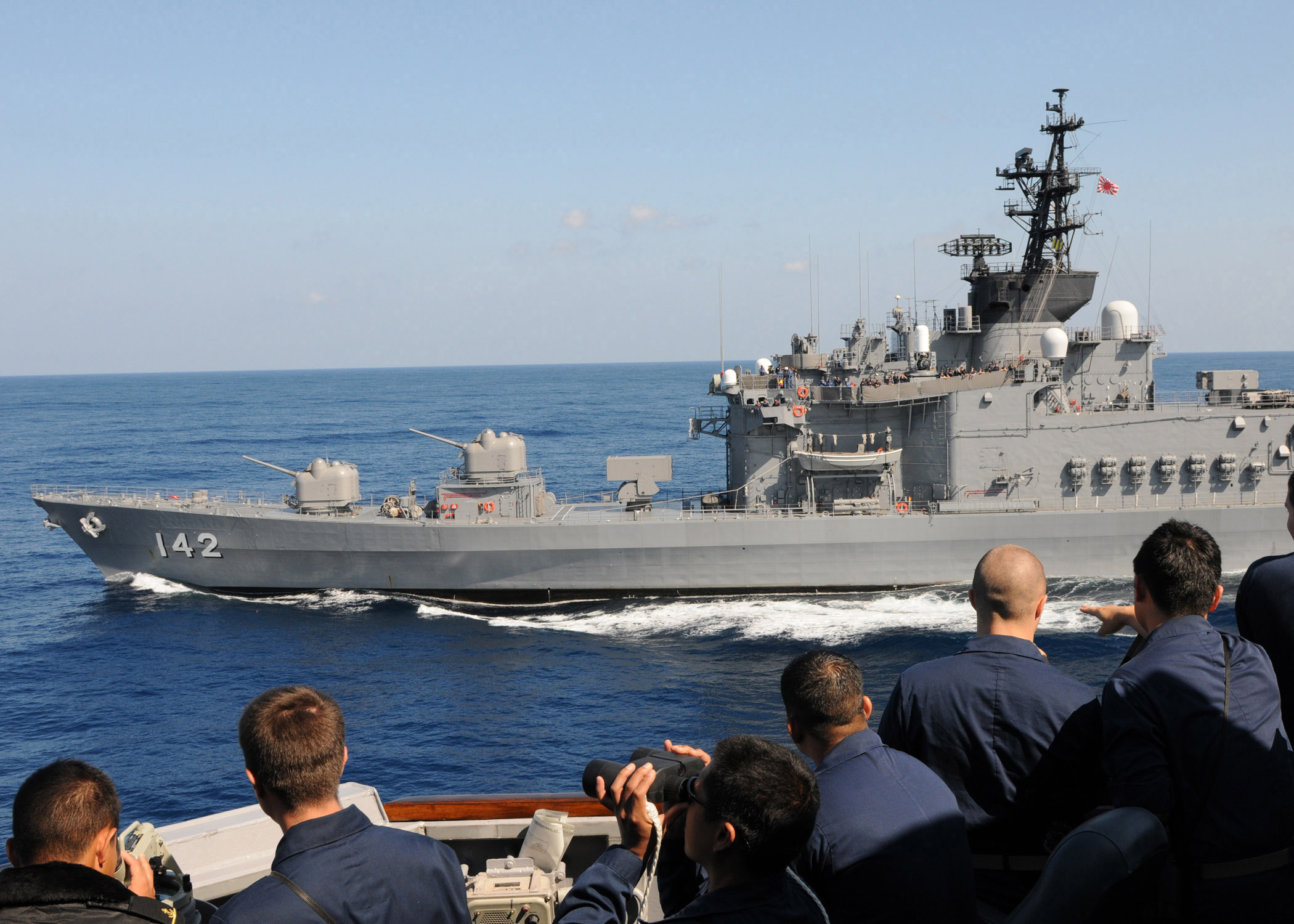
OPS-11C aboard JS Hiei

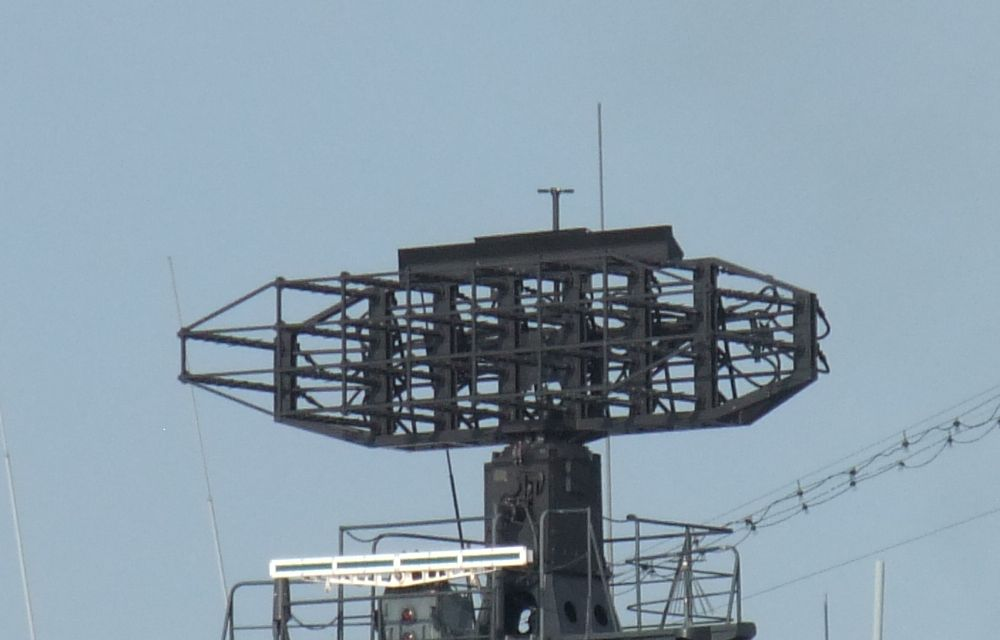
OPS-11C aboard JS Hatakaze

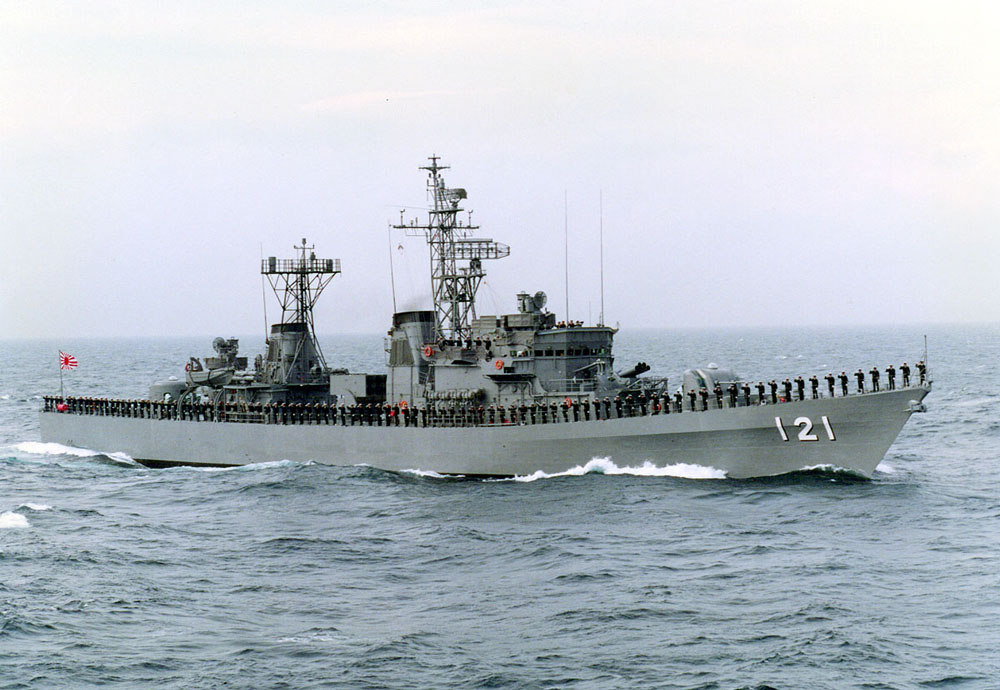
OPS-11B aboard JDS Yūgumo
