= JS Asagiri =

Asagiri-class destroyer

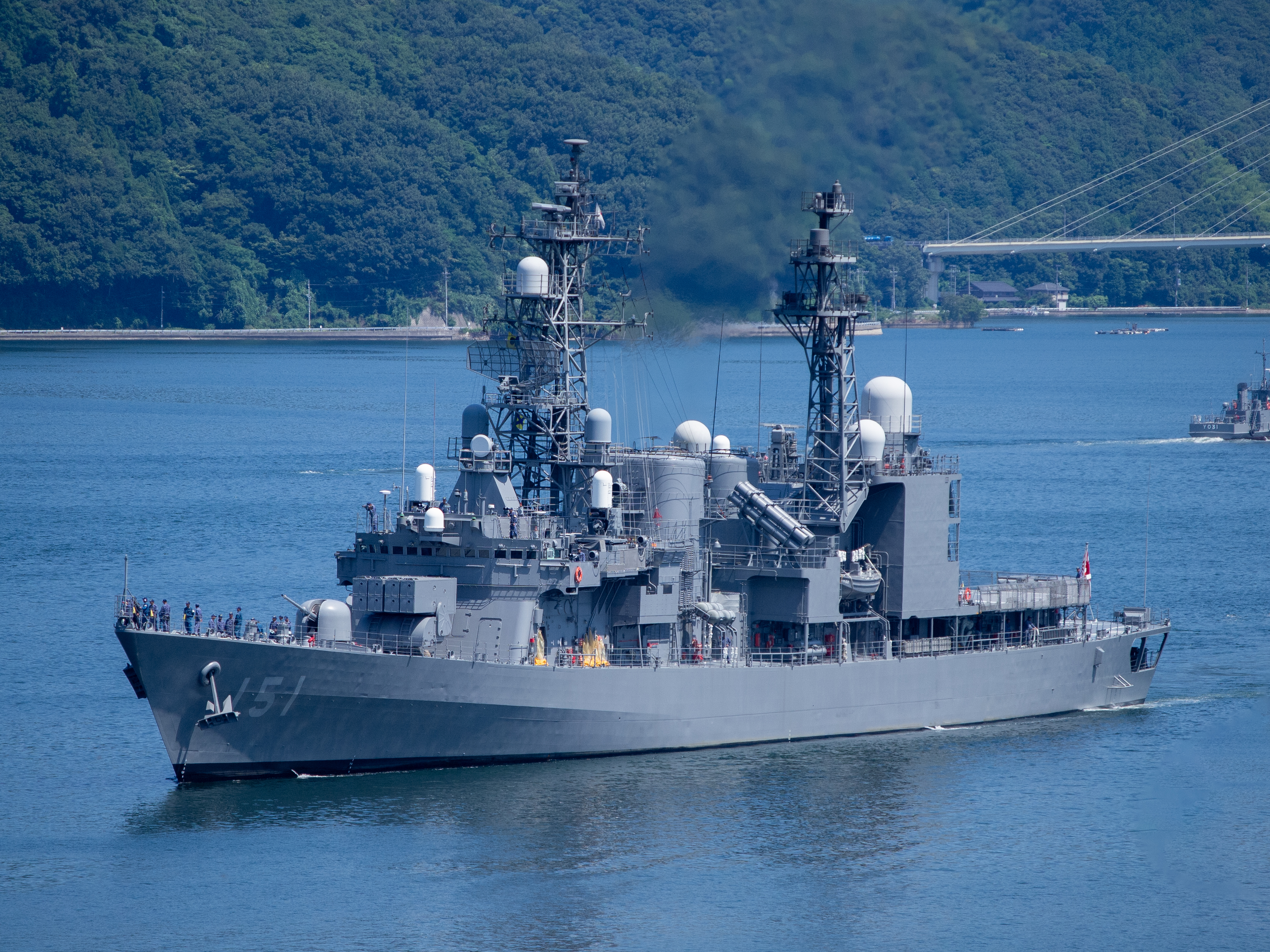
- JS Asagiri at Maizuru on 23 July 2025

History

Japan
- Name: Asagiri; (あさぎり)
- Namesake: Asagiri (1929)
- Ordered: 29 March 1984
- Builder: IHI Corporation, Tokyo
- Laid down: 13 February 1985
- Launched: 19 September 1986
- Commissioned: 17 March 1988
- Decommissioned: 23 March 2026
- Out of service: January 2026
- Reclassified: TV-3516 on 16 February 2005
- Home port: Maizuru
- Identification: MMSI number: 431999517; Callsign: JSPE; Pennant number: DD-151 as of 14 March 2012
- Status: Decommissioned in March 2026

General characteristics
- Class & type: Asagiri-class destroyer
- Length: 137 m (449 ft 6 in)
- Beam: 14.6 m (47 ft 11 in)
- Draft: 4.5 m (14 ft 9 in)
- Propulsion: 4 gas turbines 54,000 shp (40,000 kW)
- Speed: 30 knots (56 km/h; 35 mph)
- Range: 8,030 nmi (14,870 km; 9,240 mi) at 14 knots (26 km/h; 16 mph)
- Complement: 220
- Sensors & processing systems: OYQ-6/7 CDS (w/ Link-11); OPS-14/24 air search radar; OPS-28 surface search radar; OQS-4A hull sonar; OQR-1 TACTASS
- Electronic warfare & decoys: NOLR-8 intercept; OLT-3 jammer; Mark 36 SRBOC
- Armament: 1 × Otobreda 76 mm gun; 2 × missile canister up to 8 Harpoon SSM; 2 × 20 mm Phalanx CIWS; 1 × Mk.29 Sea Sparrow SAM octuple launcher; 1 × Mk.16 ASROC anti-submarine rocket octuple launcher; 2 × HOS-302A triple 324 mm (12.8 in) torpedo tubes
- Aircraft carried: 1 SH-60J(K) anti-submarine helicopter

JS Asagiri (DD-151) was an Asagiri-class destroyer of the Japan Maritime Self-Defense Force (JMSDF) and was the oldest warship in commission in the JMSDF.

== Development and design ==
The Asagiri class is equipped for combat and interception missions and is primarily armed with anti-ship weapons. They carry two of the Mk-141 Guided Missile Launching System (GMLS), which are anti-ship missile systems. The ship is also fitted to be used against submarines. She also carries Mk-32 Surface Vessel Torpedo Tubes (SVTT), which can be used as an anti-submarine weapon. The ship has two of these systems abeam to starboard and to port. The ship is also fitted with a Oto-Melara 62-caliber gun to be used against sea and air targets.

They are 137 m (449 ft 6 in) long and have a range of 8,000 nautical miles (15,000 km; 9,200 mi) at 14 knots (26 km/h; 16 mph), with a top speed of 30 knots (56 km/h; 35 mph). The ship can have up to 220 personnel on board. The ship is also fitted to accommodate for one aircraft. The ship's flight deck can be used to service a SH-60J9(K) Seahawk helicopter.

== Construction and career ==
She was laid down on 13 February 1985 and launched on 19 September 1986 by IHI Corporation, Tokyo. She was commissioned on 17 March 1988.

On 16 February 2005, she was reclassified as a training ship, and the ship's hull number was changed to TV-3516. It was transferred to the training fleet 1st training corps. In 2008 and 2011, she participated in a practice voyage to the ocean with the training ship JS Kashima.

On 14 March 2012, she was reclassified to an escort ship again, and the ship registration number was changed to DD-151. Reorganized into the 14th escort fleet, the ship's fixed port became Maizuru.

In late August 2019, she took over the mission of JS Sazanami, and, on 1 September on her way back to Japan, she stopped at Muscat, the capital of Oman in the Middle East and conducted tactical movements and communication & goodwill training with the Omani patrol boat Al Seeb in the waters around the country. Joint training with the Philippine Navy corvette BRP Emilio Jacinto was held from 24–26 September. On 4 October, she returned to Maizuru after completing her mission off the coast of Somalia.

== Gallery ==
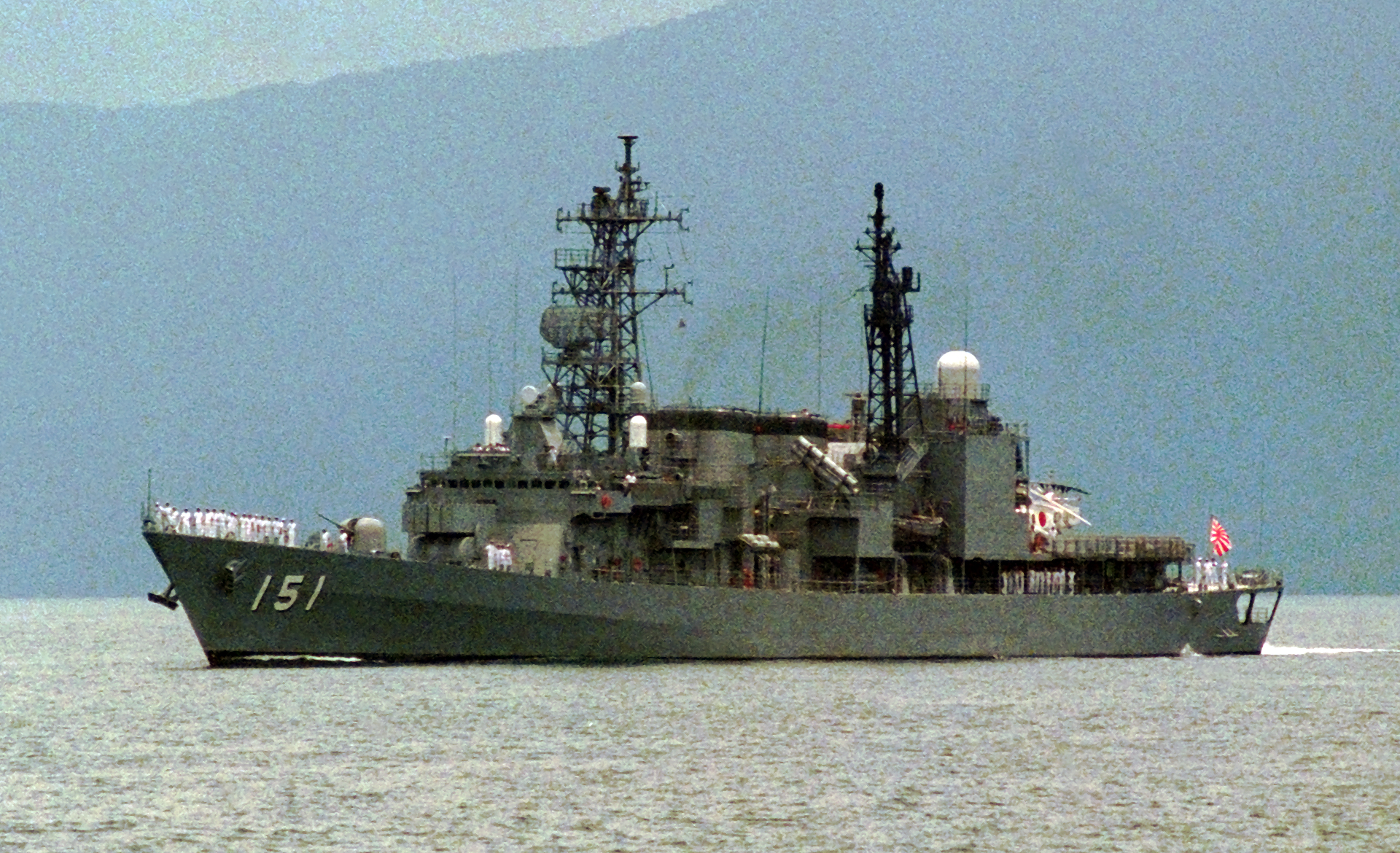
JS Asagiri on 1 July 1990.

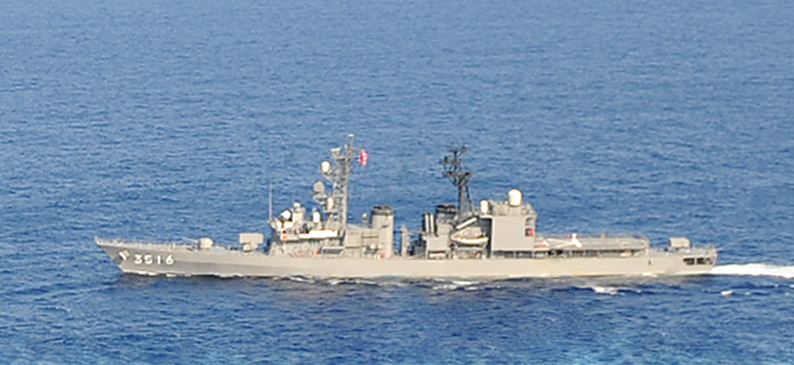
JS Asagiri as a training ship on 31 July 2011.

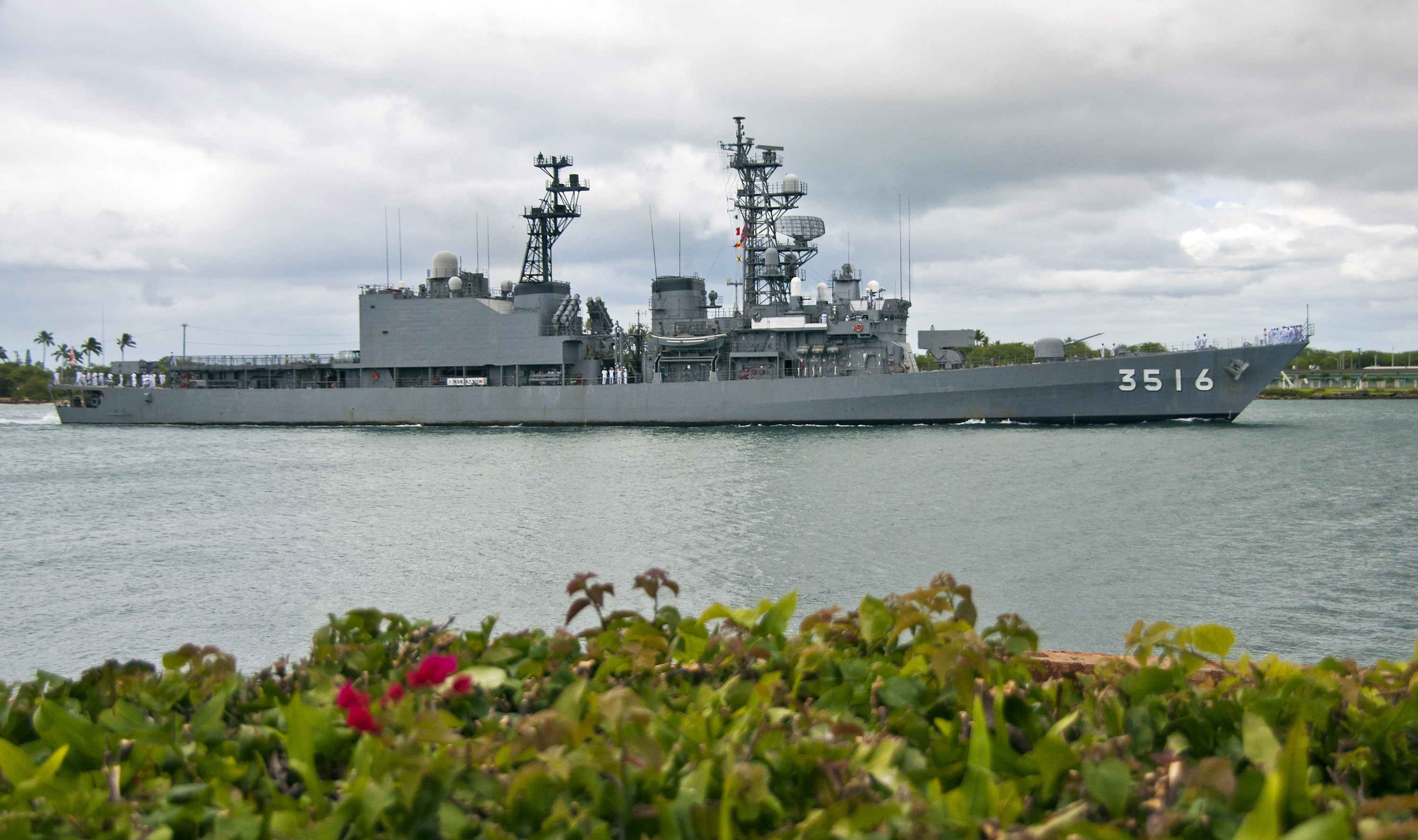
JS Asagiri at Pearl Harbor on 10 October 2011.

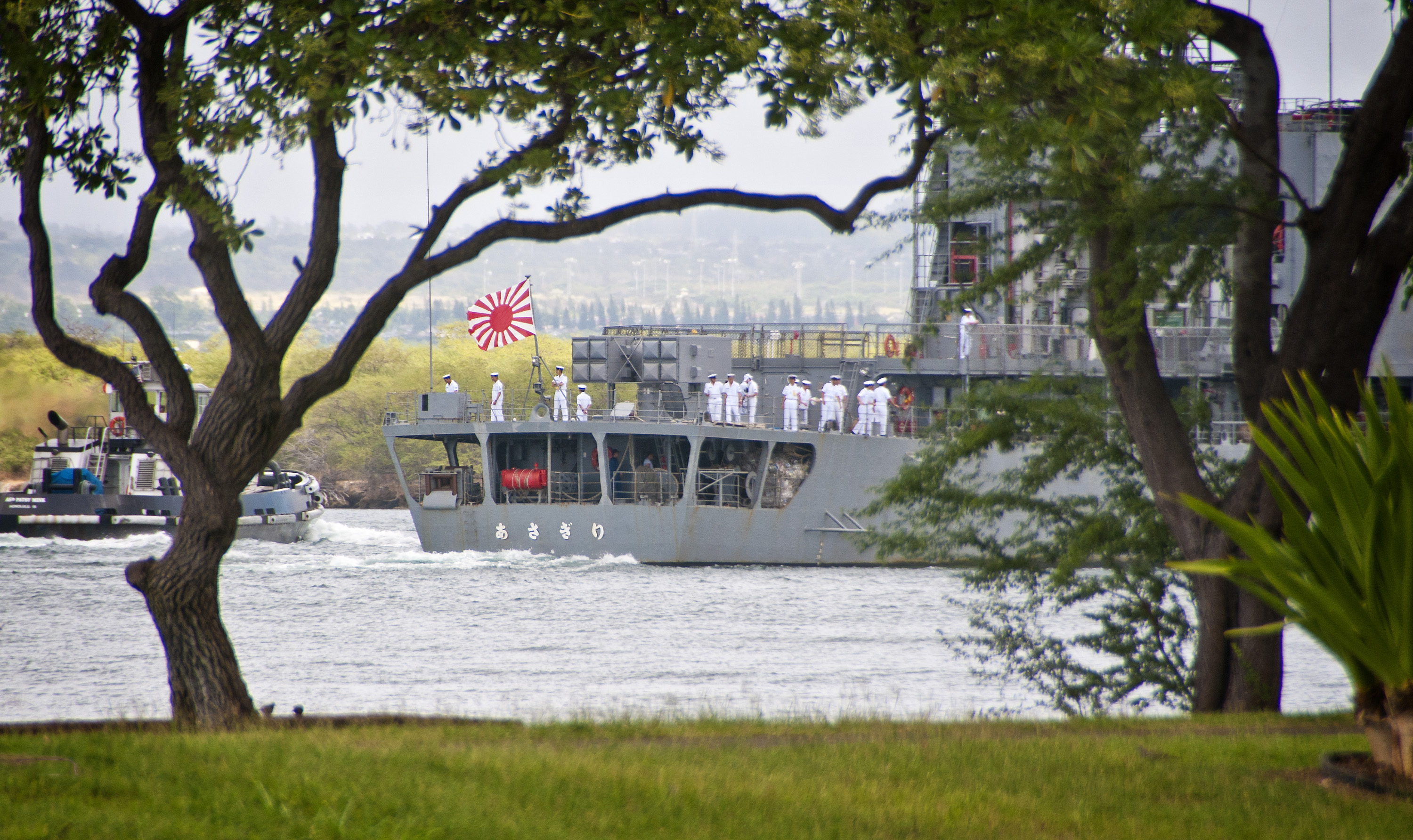
JS Asagiri at Pearl Harbor on 10 October 2011.

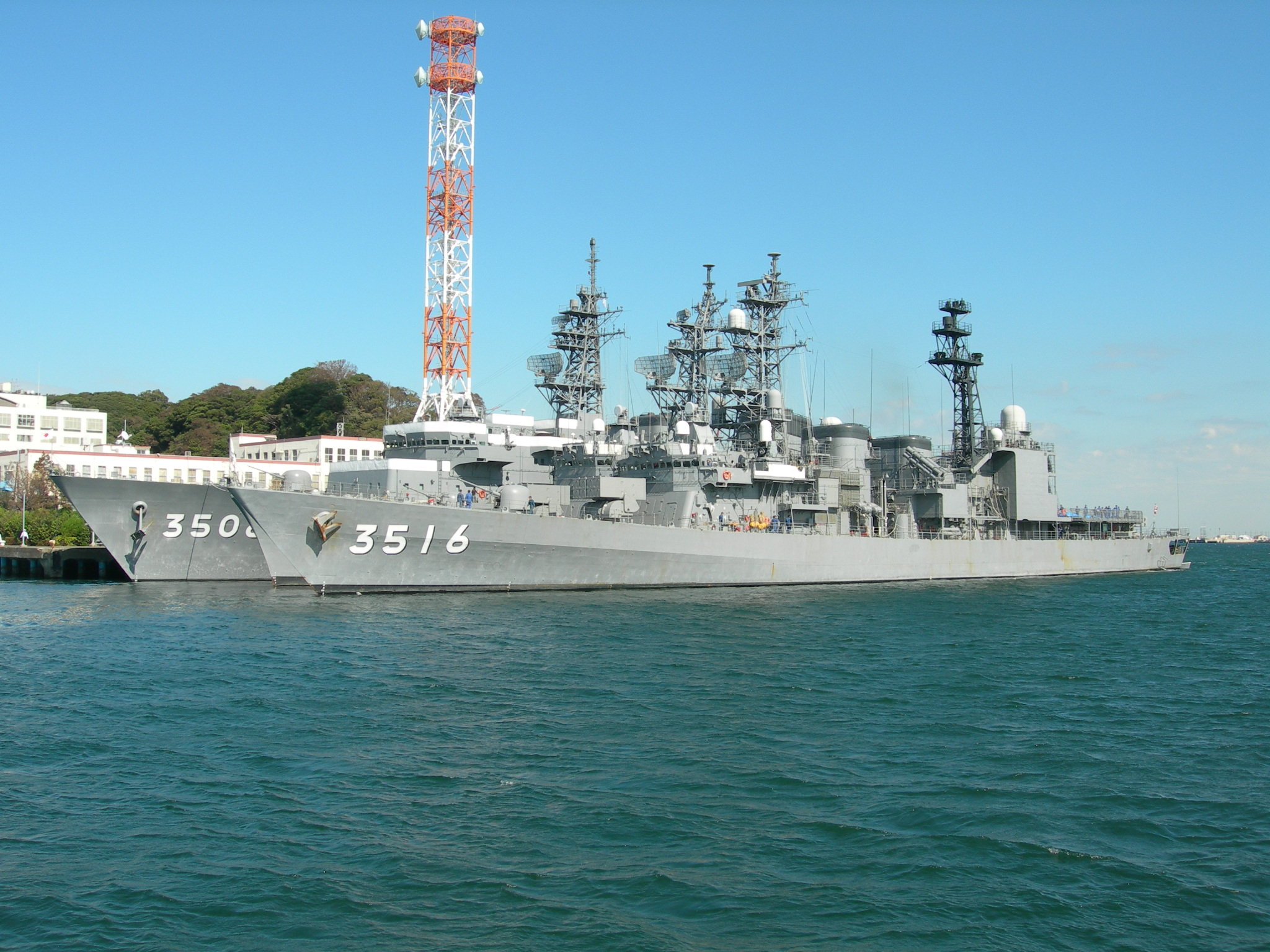
JS Asagiri alongside JS Kashima on 26 October 2011.

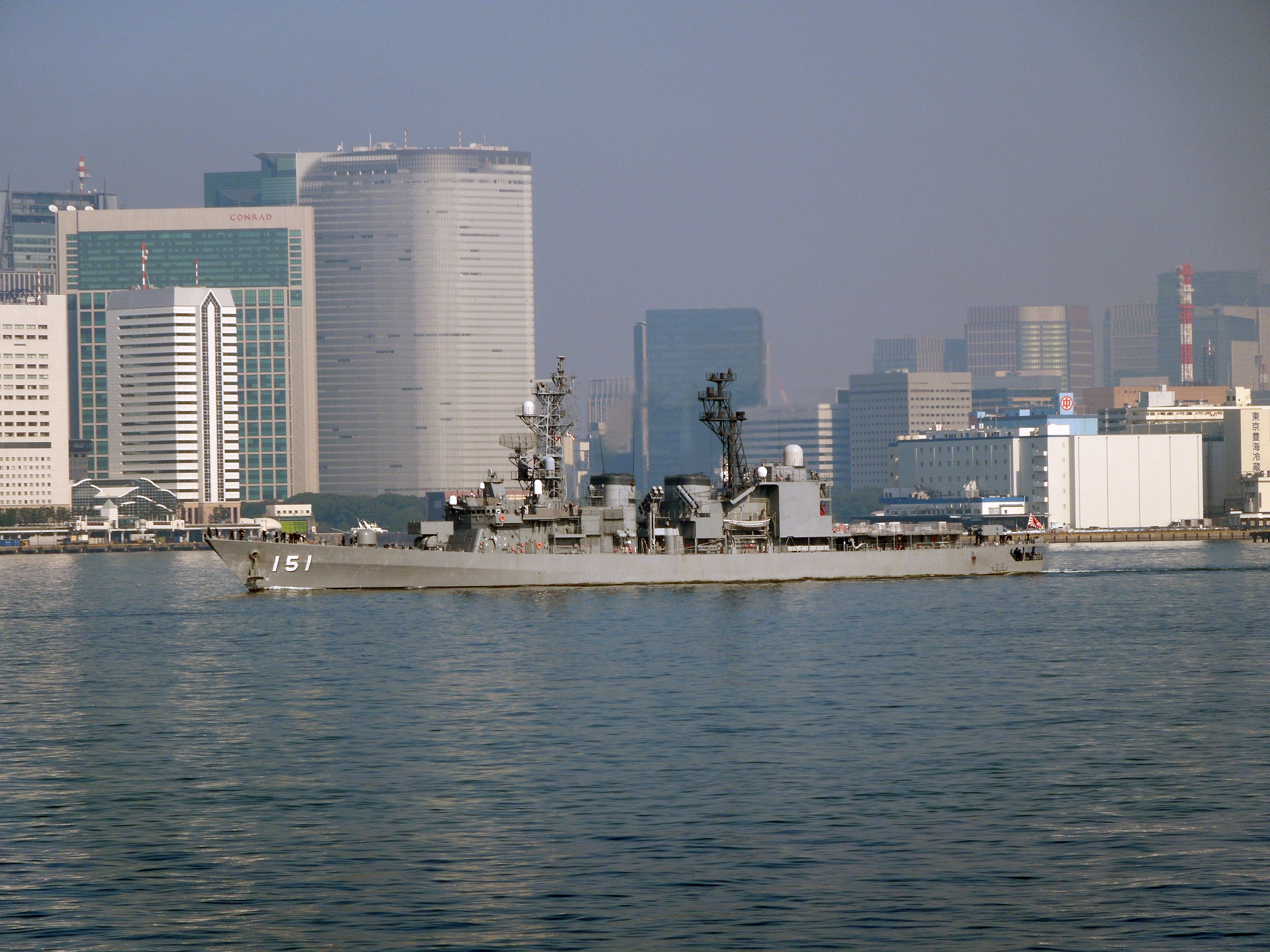
JS Asagiri on 25 October 2014.

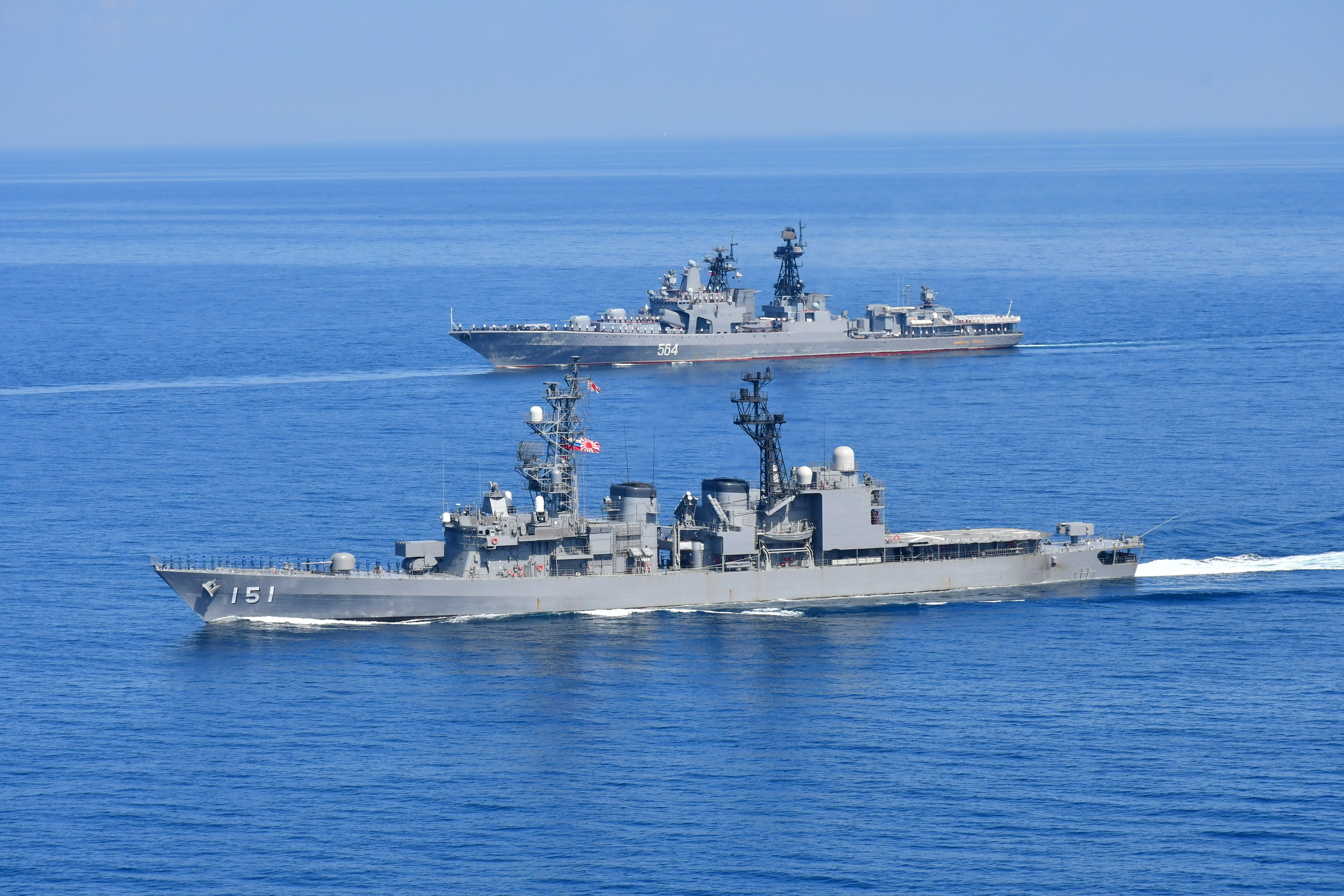
JS Asagiri with an Udaloy-class destroyer on 23 June 2018.

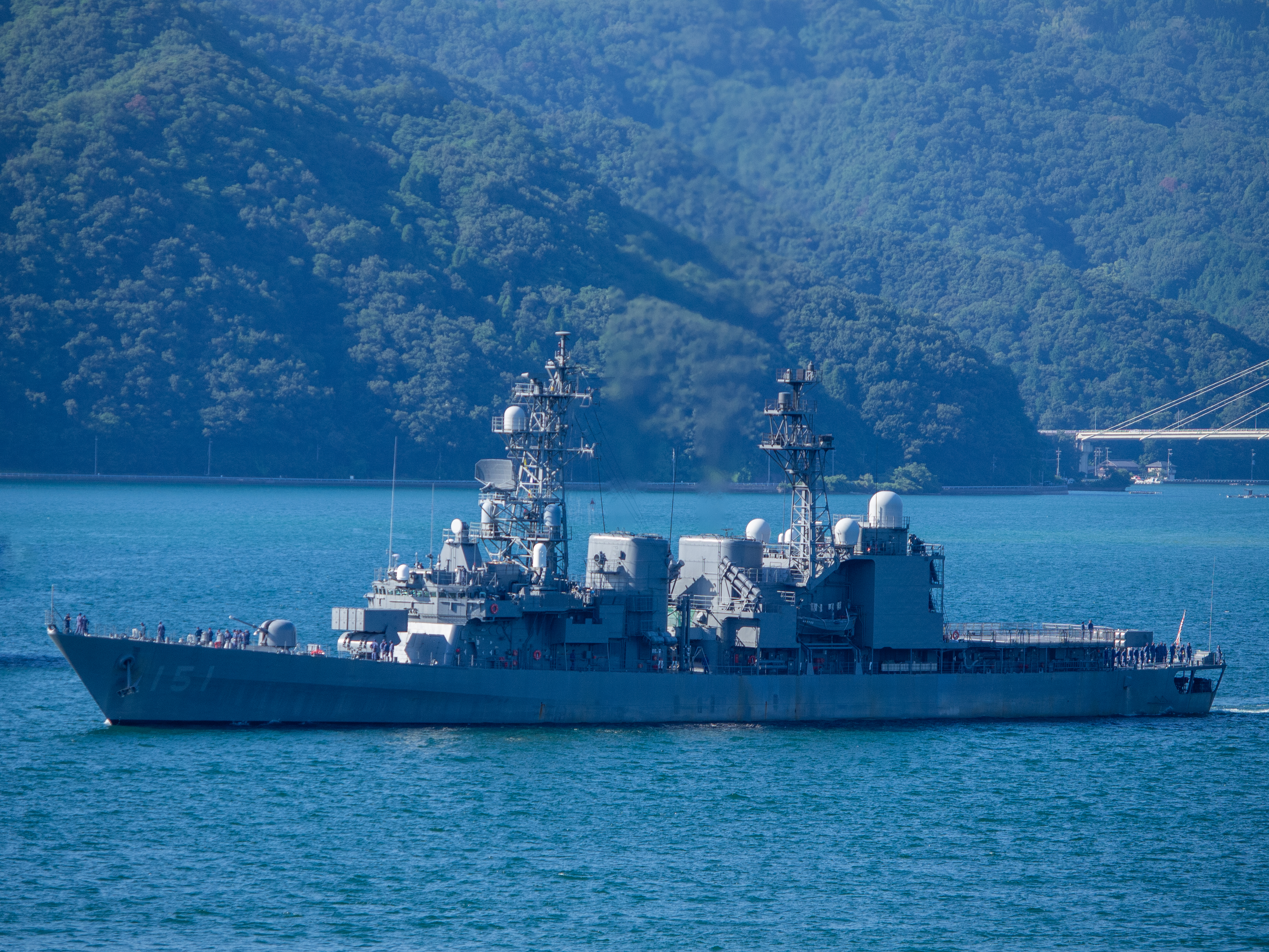
JS Asagiri in Maizuru, 2 August 2024.
