= JS Kashima =

Training ship owned by the Japan Maritime Self-Defense Force

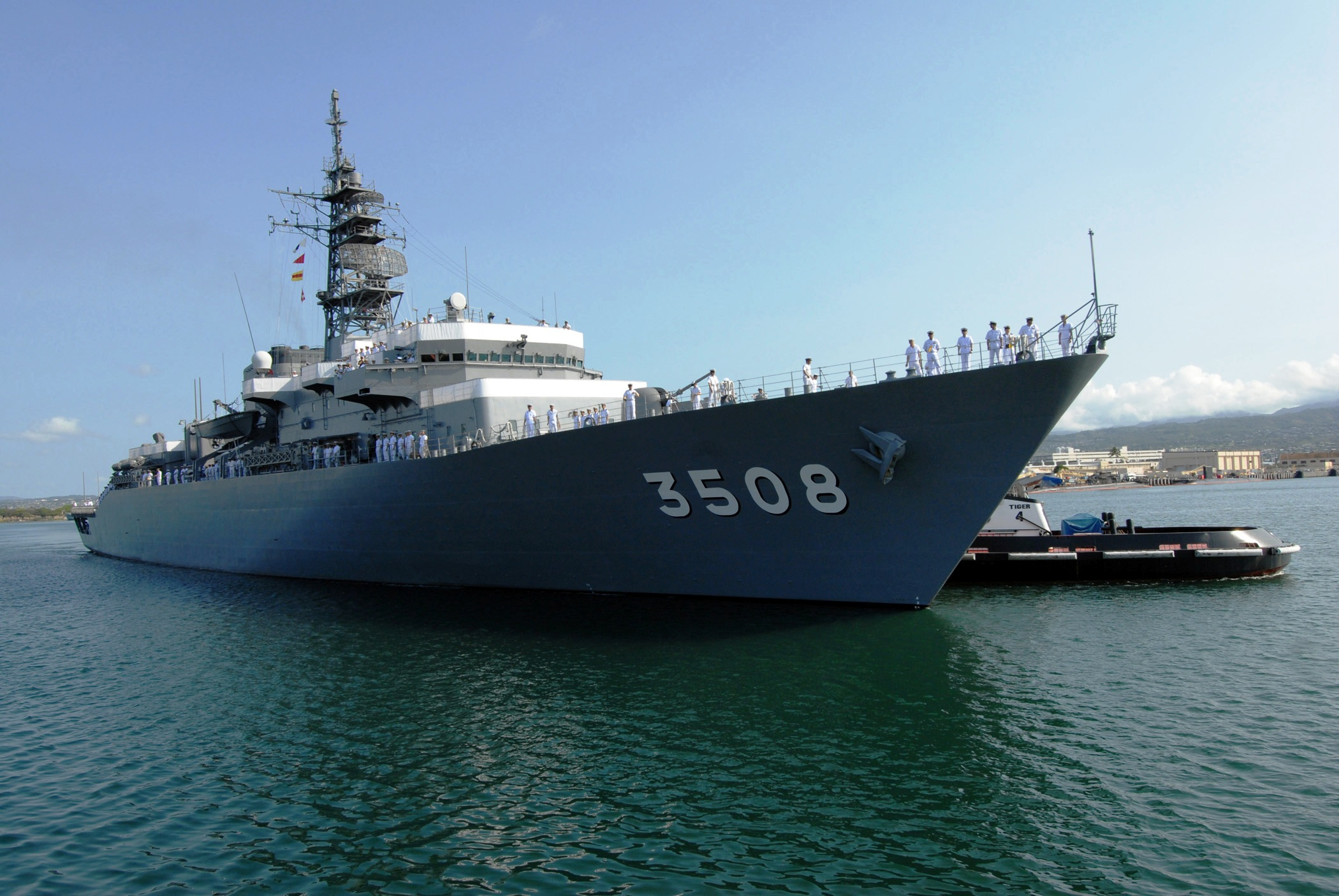
- JS Kashima in Pearl Harbor during April 2008

History

Japan
- Name: Kashima; (かしま)
- Namesake: Kashima
- Ordered: 1992
- Builder: Hitachi, Maizuru
- Laid down: 20 April 1993
- Launched: 23 February 1994
- Commissioned: 26 January 1995
- Home port: Kure
- Identification: MMSI number: 431999529; Pennant number: TV-3508
- Status: Active

General characteristics
- Type: Training ship
- Displacement: 4,050 tons Standard displacement
- Length: 143 m (469 ft)
- Beam: 18 m (59 ft)
- Draft: 4.6 m (15 ft)
- Propulsion: CODOG; 2 × Mitsubishi S16U-MTK diesels; 2 × Rolls-Royce Spey SM1C gas turbines - 26,150 shp each
- Speed: 25 knots (46 km/h; 29 mph)
- Complement: 370
- Armament: 1 × Otobreda 76 mm gun; 2 × triple torpedo tubes; 4 × saluting cannon
- Aviation facilities: Helipad

JS Kashima (TV-3508) is a training ship of the Japan Maritime Self-Defense Force (JMSDF). Built to a unique design during the mid-1990s, Kashima is flagship of the JMSDF Training Fleet. The name Kashima comes from the famous Shinto Kashima Shrine in Ibaraki prefecture, located to the northeast of Tokyo.

== Development and design ==
Kashima is of a unique design referred to as the "Kashima class cadet training ship". She is 143 metres (469 ft) long, with a beam of 18 metres (59 ft), and a draft of 4.6 metres (15 ft). Kashima has a full load displacement of 4,050 tons. She is powered by a combined diesel or gas (CODOG) system, which uses two Mitsubishi S16U-MTK diesel engines for cruising, and two Kawasaki-Rolls-Royce Spey SM1C gas turbines (providing 26,150 shaft horsepower each): a diesel and a gas turbine are connected to each of the two controllable-pitch propeller shafts.

The ship is armed with a single Otobreda 76 mm gun and two triple 324 mm torpedo tube sets. Four saluting cannon are also carried. Kashima has a ship's company of 370, including officer cadets. Cadets are accommodated in two-person staterooms, allowing cadets of both sexes to train aboard the ship. The open aft deck was designed for use as a ceremonial and exercise assembly area, but can be used as a temporary helicopter landing zone.

== Construction and career ==
The ship was originally authorised under the Financial Year budget ending in 1991, but construction did not start because of Japan's financial involvement in the Gulf War. The ship was requested again under the 1992 budget, and was approved. Kashima was laid down by the Hitachi Zosen Corporation at the former Maizuru Naval Arsenal shipyards on 20 April 1993. She was launched on 23 February 1994, and commissioned into the JMSDF on 26 January 1995. She is flagship of the JMSDF Training Fleet, and is homeported at Kure.

In July 2000, while visiting New York, Kashima was involved in a minor collision with Queen Elizabeth 2. The collision left a long scratch down the flank of the liner, and a dent in the warship's hull. The Japanese took the incident with good humour, with a Japanese admiral onboard commenting "it was an honour to be kissed by the Queen Elizabeth".

In June 2022, the Kashima made a port call in London as part of an exchange event between Japan and Britain and to commemorate the 120th anniversary of the Anglo-Japanese Alliance in 2022. The ship will participate in an exercise with Britain's Royal Navy. A second call in London was made in September 2024, marked by its band playing the theme from Thunderbirds while passing under Tower Bridge.

== Gallery ==
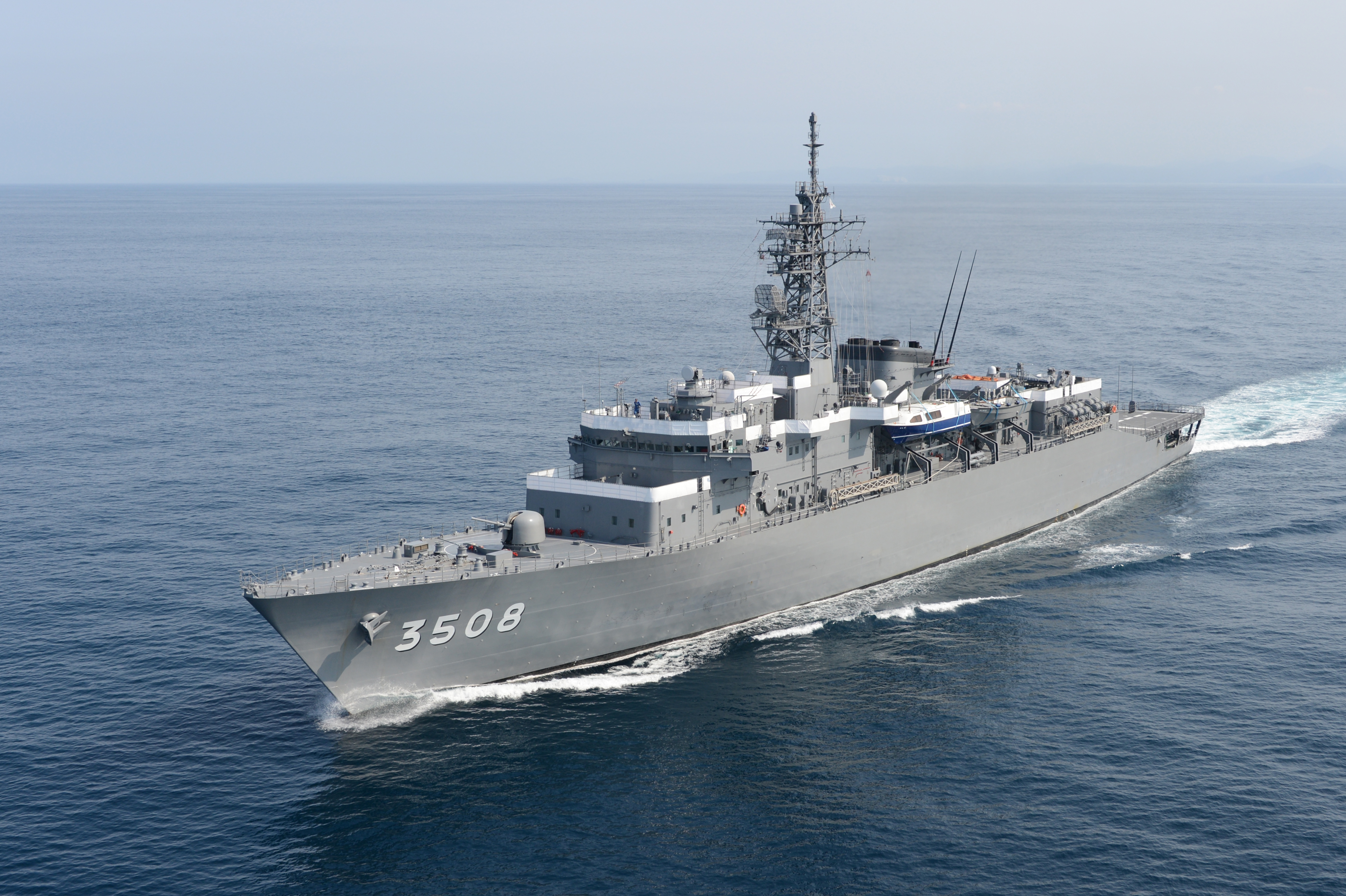
JS Kashima underway, date unknown

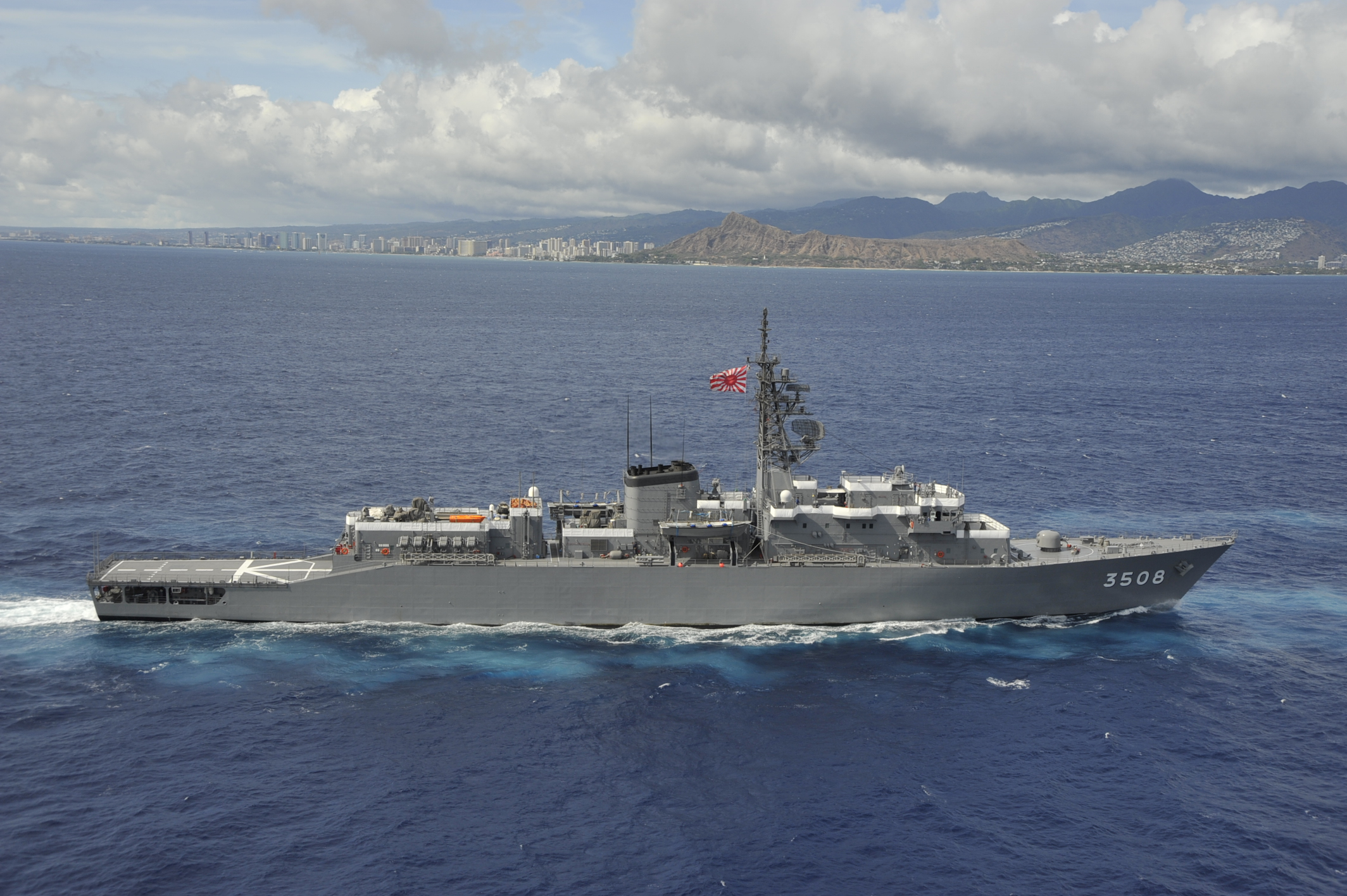
JS Kashima underway, date unknown

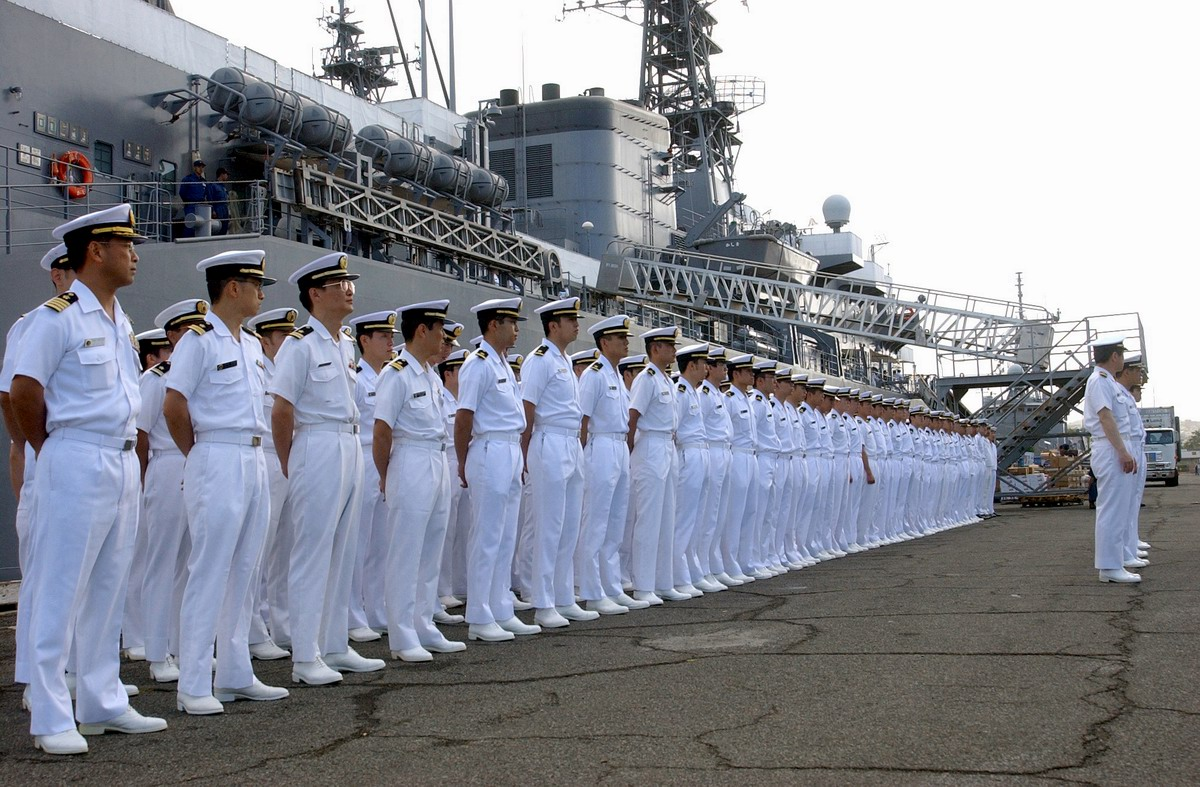
Japanese officers and sailors assigned to the JDS Kashima on a port call in Pearl Harbor, 2004

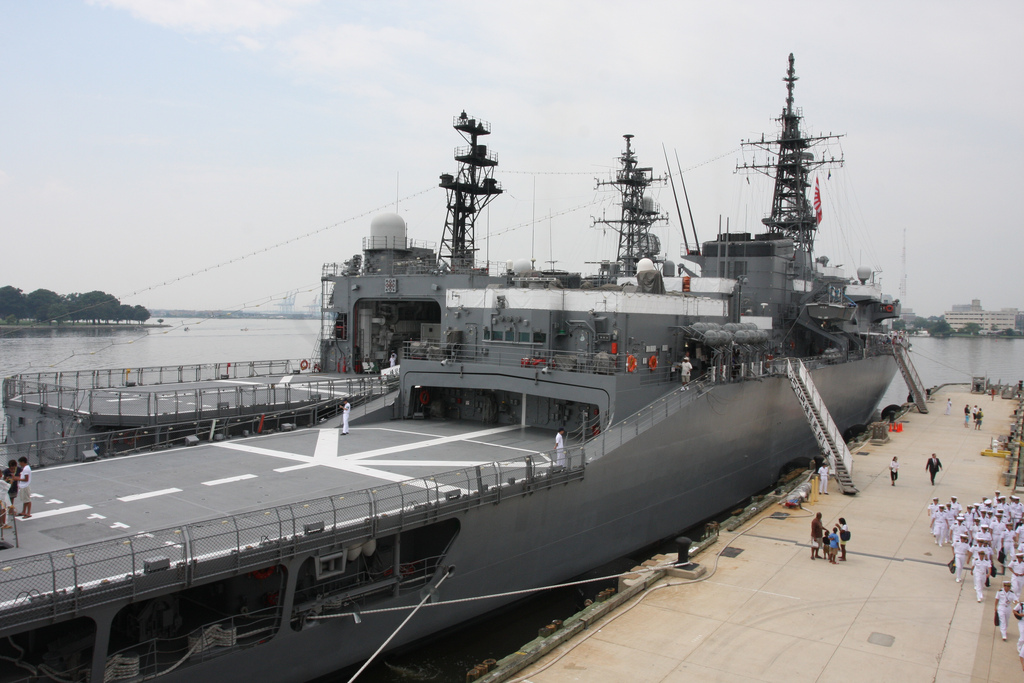
JS Kashima and JS Asagiri at Virginia on 3 August 2011.

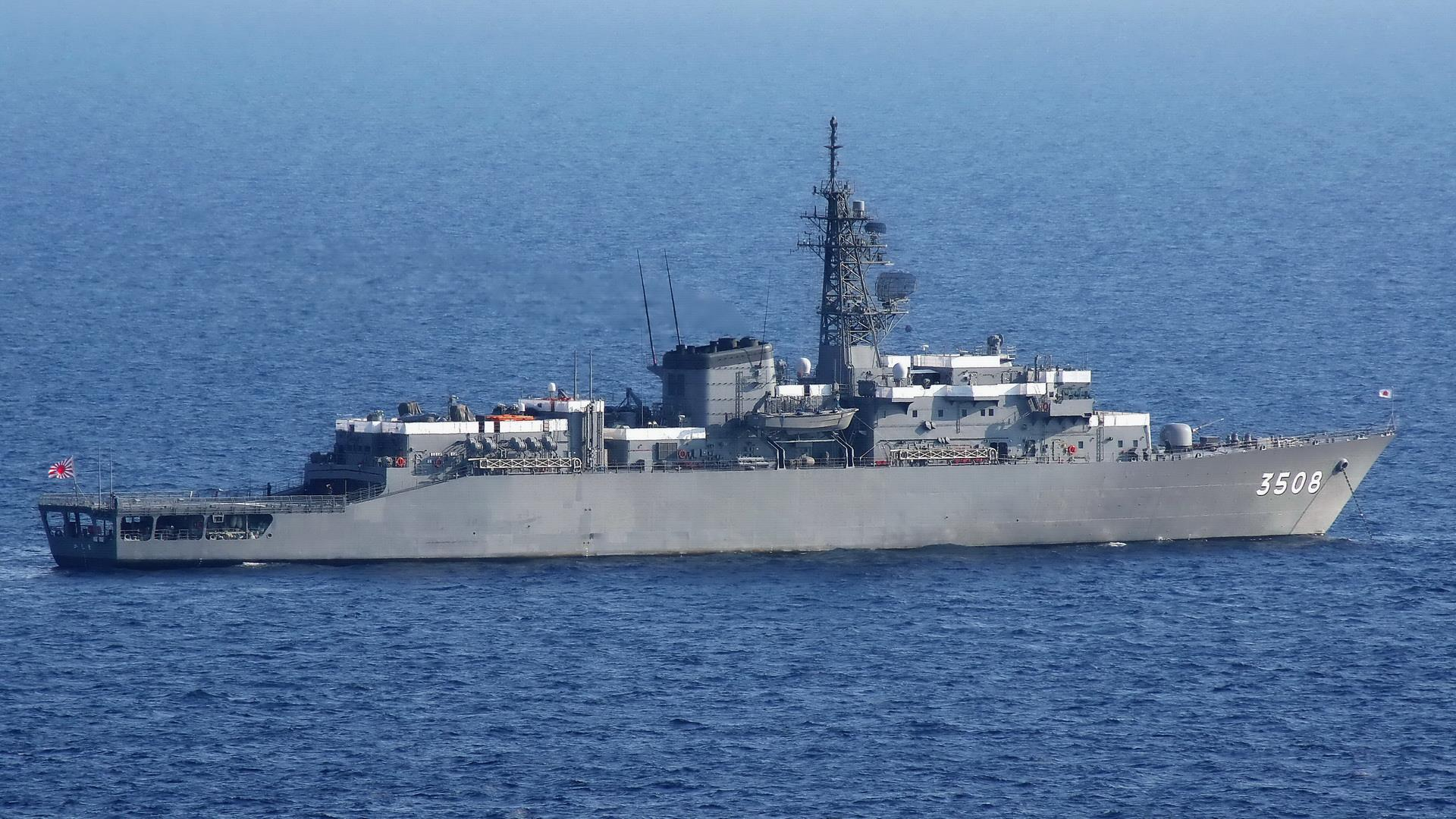
JS Kashima at Split on 2 September 2013.

== See also ==
- Kaiwo Maru (1989)
