= Minegumo-class destroyer =

Japanese military vessel

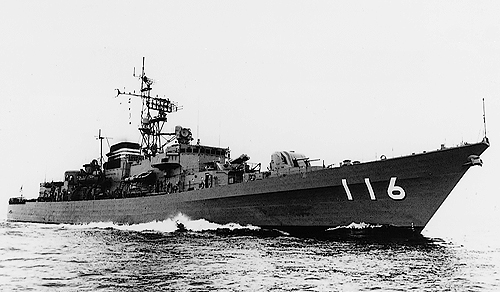
- JS Minegumo (DD-116)

Class overview
- Name: Minegumo-class destroyer
- Builders: Uraga Heavy Industries (1); Mitsui Shipbuilding & Engineering (1); Maizuru Heavy Industries (1)
- Operators: Japan Maritime Self-Defense Force
- Preceded by: Takatsuki-class destroyer
- Succeeded by: Yamagumo-class destroyer
- In commission: 1967–2000
- Completed: 3
- Retired: 3

General characteristics
- Type: Destroyer
- Displacement: 2,100 long tons (2,134 t) standard; (Murakumo : 2,150 long tons (2,185 t)); 2,750 long tons (2,794 t) full load
- Length: 115 m (377 ft 4 in)
- Beam: 11.8 m (38 ft 9 in)
- Draft: 3.8 m (12 ft 6 in)
- Complement: 210
- Sensors & processing systems: OPS-11B EWR; OPS-17 surface search radar; OQS-3 hull-sonar; SQS-35 variable depth sonar; Mark 56 fire-control system
- Electronic warfare & decoys: NOLR-1B electronic warfare suite
- Armament: 2 × Mk.33 twin 3"/50 caliber guns; 1 × OTO Melara 76 mm(Murakumo only); 1 × 4 Bofors 375 mm (15 in) ASW rocket launcher; 2 × HOS-301 triple 324 mm (12.8 in) torpedo tubes
- Aircraft carried: 2 × QH-50D DASH anti-submarine drone helicopter (removed in 1979-82 and ASROC fitted)

The Minegumo-class destroyer is a destroyer class of the Japanese Maritime Self-Defense Force, the successor of the Yamagumo class.

This class derived from its predecessor Yamagumo class to be fitted with the QH-50D DASH, the new anti-submarine drone helicopter in return for the removal of the ASROC system. And similarly, it mainly tasked with Anti-submarine warfare. In 1969, after the production of the QH-50D ceased, this class was no longer built and construction of the Yamagumo-class resumed.

The JMSDF considered refitting Light Airborne Multi-Purpose System Mk.1 with the Kaman SH-2 Seasprite helicopter in return for the facility of DASH, but this plan was abandoned because of the problem of cost. Finally, the facility of DASH was removed in 1979-82, and Mk.16 GMLS for the ASROC system was fitted.

Murakumo was refitted in 1978 for use as a gun trials ship. Rear Mk.33 gun was removed and a new OTO Melara 76 mm gun was added.

== Names ==
Pennant no.	Name	Shipbuilder	Laid down	Launched	Commissioned	Training Ship Conversion	Decommissioned
DD-116; TV-3509	Minegumo	Mitsui Shipbuilding, Tamano shipyard	March 14, 1967	December 16, 1967	August 31, 1968	August 1, 1995	March 18, 1999
DD-117; TV-3510	Natsugumo	Uraga Heavy Industries	June 26, 1967	July 25, 1968	April 25, 1969	August 1, 1995	March 18, 1999
DD-118; TV-3511	Murakumo	Maizuru Heavy Industries	October 19, 1968	November 15, 1969	August 21, 1970	March 16, 1998	June 18, 2000

== See also ==
- List of destroyer classes

Equivalent destroyers of the same era

- Type 82
- Mod Kashin class
- Daegu class
- Perth class
- Fante class
