= Super Shimakaze-class destroyer =

Abandoned class of Japanese ships in WWII

Class overview
- Name: Super Shimakaze class
- Operators: Imperial Japanese Navy
- Preceded by: Shimakaze
- Succeeded by: Super Akizuki
- Planned: 19 (1942)
- Canceled: 19 (1942)

General characteristics
- Type: Destroyer
- Displacement: 2,567 tons standard; 3,048 tons full load
- Length: 413 ft 5 in (126.01 m) (overall)
- Beam: 36 ft 9 in (11.20 m)
- Draught: 13 ft 7 in (4.14 m)
- Depth: 23 ft 4 in (7.11 m)
- Propulsion: 3 × Kampon water tube boilers, 2 × Kampon geared turbines, 2 shafts, 75,000 shp (56 MW)
- Speed: 39.0 kn (72.2 km/h)
- Range: 6,000 nmi (11,000 km) at 18 kn (33 km/h)
- Armament: 6 × 127 mm (5.0 in)/50 cal DP guns; some Type 96 25 mm AA guns; 15 × 610 mm Type 93 torpedoes; some depth charges

The Super Shimakaze-class destroyers (超島風型駆逐艦, Chō-Shimakaze gata kuchiku-kan) were a projected class of destroyer of the Imperial Japanese Navy (IJN), developed during the Second World War. The intention was to develop a mass-production destroyer based on the experimental destroyer Shimakaze. The IJN Fleet Command gave them the project number V6. However, the project was cancelled with none of the proposed ships being completed, because the IJN was heavily crippled at Midway in June 1942.

They were a lengthened version of the Yūgumo-class destroyer. These destroyers carried the most torpedo tubes out of any destroyer in the war, but no torpedo reloads were carried. Such a payload of torpedoes could have sunk a heavily armoured battleship in one go. A potent destroyer, they came too late in the war to do anything that could have changed the situation.

== General characteristics ==
The only destroyer was 126.01 metres (413 feet 5 inches) long overall, had a beam of 11.20 metres (36 feet 9 inches), a draught of 4.14 metres (13 feet 7 inches), and a depth of 7.10 metres. It displaced 2,570 tonnes at standard load and 3,048 tonnes at full load. It was powered by 3 Kampon water-tube boilers which fed steam to two Kampon geared steam turbines at two shafts, giving 75,000 shaft horsepower (55 MW). This allowed her to reach speeds exceeding 40 kn (46 mph; 74 km/h). She was able to travel at a maximum range of 6,000 nautical miles (6,900 mi; 11,000 km) at a speed of 18 kn (33 km/h; 21 mph).

== Armament ==
The main battery consisted of six 127 mm (5.0 in)/50 cal DP guns. Like all other Japanese destroyers these had a quite low rate of fire. The turrets that they are mounted on also were pretty slow at turning. They also carried an unknown number of Type 96 25 mm anti-aircraft guns, and an unknown number of Type 44 depth charges. For their torpedo, they carried 15 610 mm torpedo tubes which launch the Type 93 torpedoes.

== Ships in class ==
Ship	Ship #	Note
16 destroyers	733 to 748	Cancelled and re-planned to 7 of the Super Akizuki class (Ships # 5077–5083) on 30 June 1942

== Bibliography ==
- Rekishi Gunzō, History of Pacific War Vol.23 Akizuki class destroyers, Gakken (Japan), 1999, ISBN 4-05-602063-9
- Collection of writings by Sizuo Fukui Vol.5, Stories of Japanese Destroyers, Kōjinsha (Japan) 1993, ISBN 4-7698-0611-6
