= Japanese destroyer Shimakaze (1942) =

Destroyer of the Imperial Japanese Navy

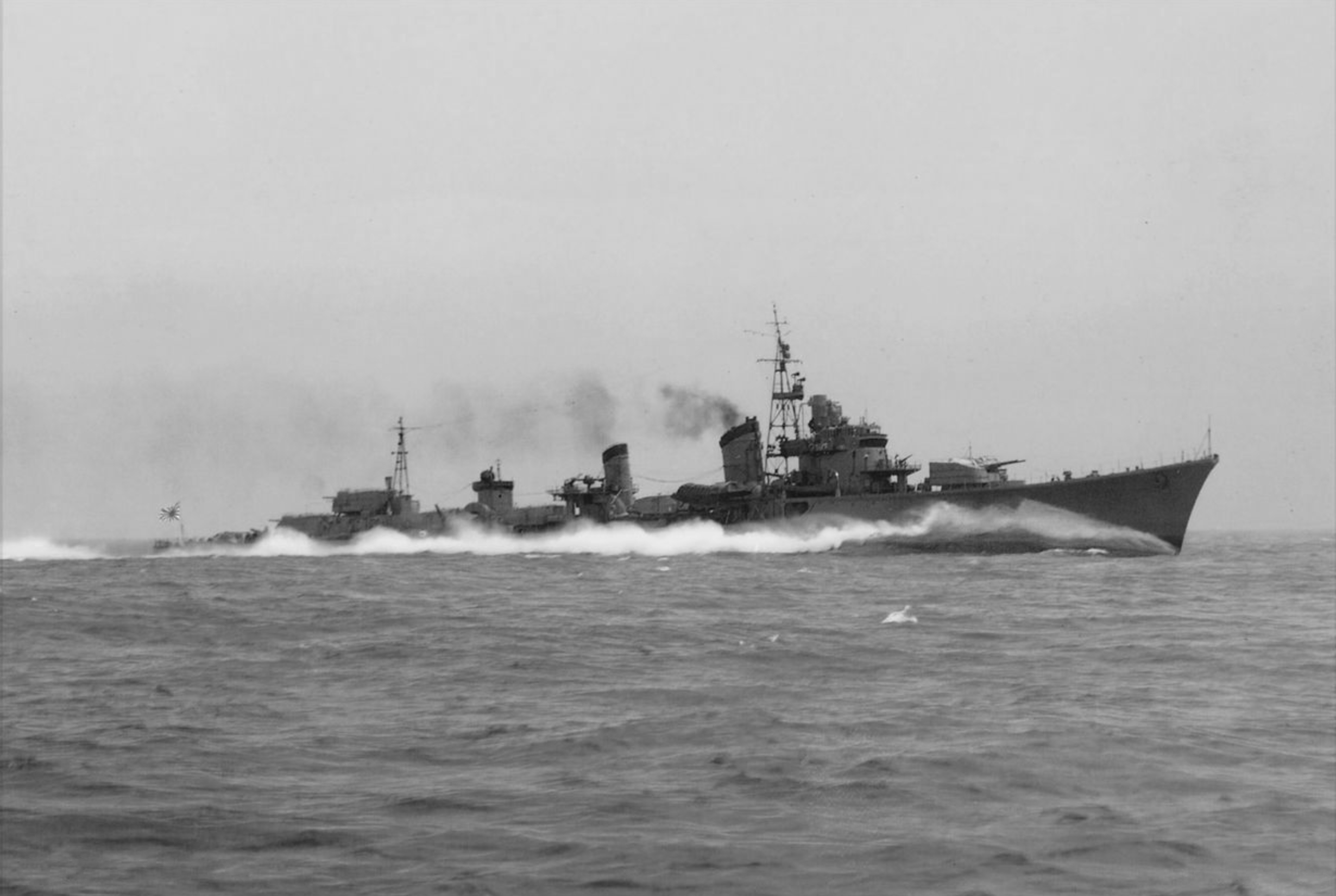
- Shimakaze on sea trials at Miyazu Bay, 5 May 1943

Class overview
- Name: Shimakaze class
- Operators: Imperial Japanese Navy
- Preceded by: Yūgumo class
- Succeeded by: Super Shimakaze class (planned)
- Completed: 1
- Lost: 1

History

Empire of Japan
- Name: Shimakaze
- Namesake: 島風 (Island Wind)
- Builder: Maizuru Naval Arsenal
- Laid down: 8 August 1941
- Launched: 18 July 1942
- Commissioned: 10 May 1943
- Stricken: 10 January 1945
- Fate: Sunk in the Battle of Ormoc Bay, 11 November 1944

General characteristics
- Type: Experimental Destroyer
- Displacement: 2,570 long tons (2,611 t) (standard); 3,300 long tons (3,353 t) (full load)
- Length: 129.5 m (424 ft 10 in) o/a; 126 m (413 ft 5 in) w/l
- Beam: 11.2 m (36 ft 9 in)
- Draft: 4.15 m (13 ft 7 in)
- Installed power: 3 × water-tube boilers; 75,000 shp (56,000 kW)
- Propulsion: 2 × shafts; 2 × geared steam turbines
- Speed: 40.9 knots (75.7 km/h; 47.1 mph)
- Range: 6,000 nmi (11,000 km; 6,900 mi) at 18 knots (33 km/h; 21 mph)
- Complement: 267 (May 1943)
- Armament: As Built: 6 × 12.7 cm Type 3 dual-purpose guns (3x2); 6 × 25 mm (1 in) Type 96 25mm anti-aircraft guns (2x3); 2 × 13.2 mm (0.52 in) anti-aircraft machine guns (1x2); 15 × 610 mm (24 in) torpedo tubes (3x5); 18 depth charges; Early 1944 Refit: 6 × 12.7 cm Type 3 dual-purpose guns (3x2); 16 × Type 96 anti-aircraft guns (4x3, 2x2) (increased in June to 28); 15 × 610 mm (24 in) torpedo tubes (3x5); 36 depth charges

Shimakaze (島風, Island Wind) was an experimental destroyer of the Imperial Japanese Navy during World War II, and intended as the lead ship in a projected new "Type C" of destroyers. She was the only destroyer to be armed with 15 torpedo tubes, each capable of firing the 610 mm (24 in) Type 93 "Long Lance" torpedo. The ship also served as a testbed for a powerful, high-temperature, high-pressure steam turbine that was able to develop 79,240 shp (59,090 kW). This made her one of the fastest destroyers in the world: her design speed was 39 knots (72 km/h; 45 mph), but on trials she made 40.9 knots (75.7 km/h; 47.1 mph).

== Background ==
Ordered in 1939 under the 4th Naval Armaments Supplement Programme, Shimakaze was laid down at Maizuru Naval Arsenal in August 1941 and completed on 10 May 1943. Under the 1941 5th Naval Armaments Supplement Programme, a total of 16 Shimakaze-class destroyers were budgeted, with long-term plans to build a total of 32 vessels to equip four destroyer squadrons. However, the complexity of the design, coupled with the lack of industrial capacity and resources during the Pacific War, prevented these plans from being realized.

== Design ==
Shimakaze was based on a lengthened version of the Yugumo design, with an additional 25 feet of length to mount an additional quintuple torpedo launcher amidships. The additional weight caused the design to be top-heavy, so no torpedo reloads were carried; however, with a broadside of three quintuple mounts which could be trained to either port or starboard, Shimakaze had one of the largest torpedo capacities of any World War II destroyer.

The main battery used on the Yugumo-class of six Type 3 127 mm 50 caliber naval guns in three twin-gun turrets, one superfiring pair aft and one turret forward of the superstructure, was retained as well as the anti-aircraft battery of two twin-mount Type 96 AA guns, and anti-submarine capability of 18 depth charges. She was also equipped with a Type 22 radar.

Her new experimental high temperature and pressure Kampon boilers developed 79,240 shaft horsepower (59,090 kW), powering a new type of turbine, which generated 50 percent more power than typical turbines used in previous destroyers. She was expected to reach a speed of 39 kn. However, during her trials on 7 April 1943, she was clocked at 40.90 knots (75.75 km/h; 47.07 mph), faster than initially planned.

In June 1944, during repairs and refit in Japan, her anti-aircraft capacity was enhanced with the additional set of triple Type 96 guns, seven single Type 96 guns, and one single Type 93 13mm machine gun, together with a Type 13 radar.

== Service history ==
On completion at Maizuru on 10 May 1943, Shimakaze was assigned to the IJN 1st Fleet, and participated in the evacuation of Japanese troops from Kiska Island towards the end of the Aleutian Islands campaign from July to August, serving as flagship for the screening force. In September and October, she was used to escort vessels between Yokosuka and Truk, and at the end of October escorted the fleet from Truk to Eniwetok due to increasing American air raids. She continued to serve as an escort to ships between Truk and Rabaul and between Truk and Yokosuka though November, and during December and January 1944 she escorted tankers between Truk, Saipan, Palau, Davao and Balikpapan. She was refitted at Kure Naval Arsenal from 17 March to 12 April 1944. From 20 April to 12 June, she was part of the escort to the Yamato and Maya from Kure to Manila, followed by Biak to cover the aborted evacuation of Japanese forces. Afterwards, she returned to Kure Naval Arsenal for repairs and enhancement of her anti-aircraft weaponry. In July, she escorted troop transports to Okinawa and continued on to Lingga, arriving in Brunei on 20 October.

She was present at the 23–25 October Battle of Leyte Gulf, although she played no role in the battle except for picking up survivors from the sunken battleship Musashi and cruiser Maya. Overloaded with survivors, she stayed at the rear of the fleet during the Battle off Samar and was unable to use her vaunted torpedo broadside. However, she did suffer minor damage due to air attacks and a minor collision with Akishimo. She returned to Manila on 31 October.

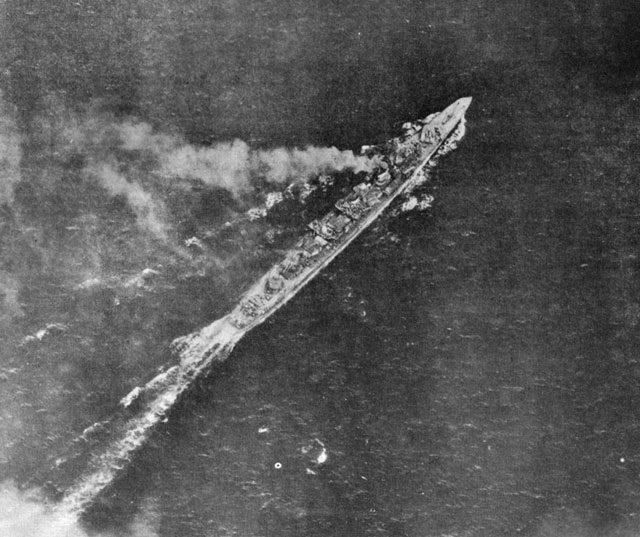
Shimakaze maneuvering during her final battle, battle of Ormoc Bay, November 11th 1944

On 4 November, Shimakaze was appointed flagship of Destroyer Squadron 2 under the command of Rear Admiral Mikio Hayakawa, and assigned to escort a troop convoy from Manila to Ormoc. She was attacked by American aircraft from Task Force 38 on 11 November 1944 during the Battle of Ormoc Bay, and disabled by strafing and near misses early in the attack. She drifted and burned for several hours before exploding and sinking at 10°50′N 124°35′E. A total of 131 survivors were rescued, but this total also included crewmen from Wakatsuki, so the total from Shimakaze is unknown. Admiral Hayakawa was killed in action. Shimakaze was removed from the navy list on 10 January 1945.

=== Wreck ===
Shimakaze was discovered by a Paul Allen-led expedition aboard RV Petrel in Ormoc Bay on 1 December 2017, 715 ft (218 m) below the surface. She was a mangled wreck but the three quintuple torpedo tube launchers confirmed her identity. Photographs from the wreck also debunked the assertion that she had one of her turrets removed in an early 1944 refit.

== Ships in class ==
Ship	Ship No.	Fate
Shimakaze (島風)	125	Exploded on 11 November 1944 after being attacked by American aircraft. Struck from record on 10 January 1945
16 destroyers (Super Shimakaze)	733-748	Cancelled and re-planned on 30 June 1942 to: 8 × Yūgumo class (Ship # 5041–5048); 7 × Super Akizuki class (Ship # 5077–5083)

== Sources ==
- Whitley, M.J. (1988). Destroyers of World War 2. Cassell Publishing. ISBN 1-85409-521-8.
- Collection of writings by Sizuo Fukui Vol.5, Stories of Japanese Destroyers, Kōjinsha (Japan) 1993, ISBN 4-7698-0611-6
- The Maru Special, Japanese Naval Vessels No.41 Japanese Destroyers I, Ushio Shobō (Japan), July 1980, Book code 68343-42
- Ford, Roger; Gibbons, Tony; Hewson, Rob; Jackson, Bob; Ross, David (2001). The Encyclopedia of Ships. London: Amber Books, Ltd. pp. 403–404. ISBN 978-1-905704-43-9.
