= JS Hatakaze (DDG-171) =

Hatakaze-class guided missile destroyer

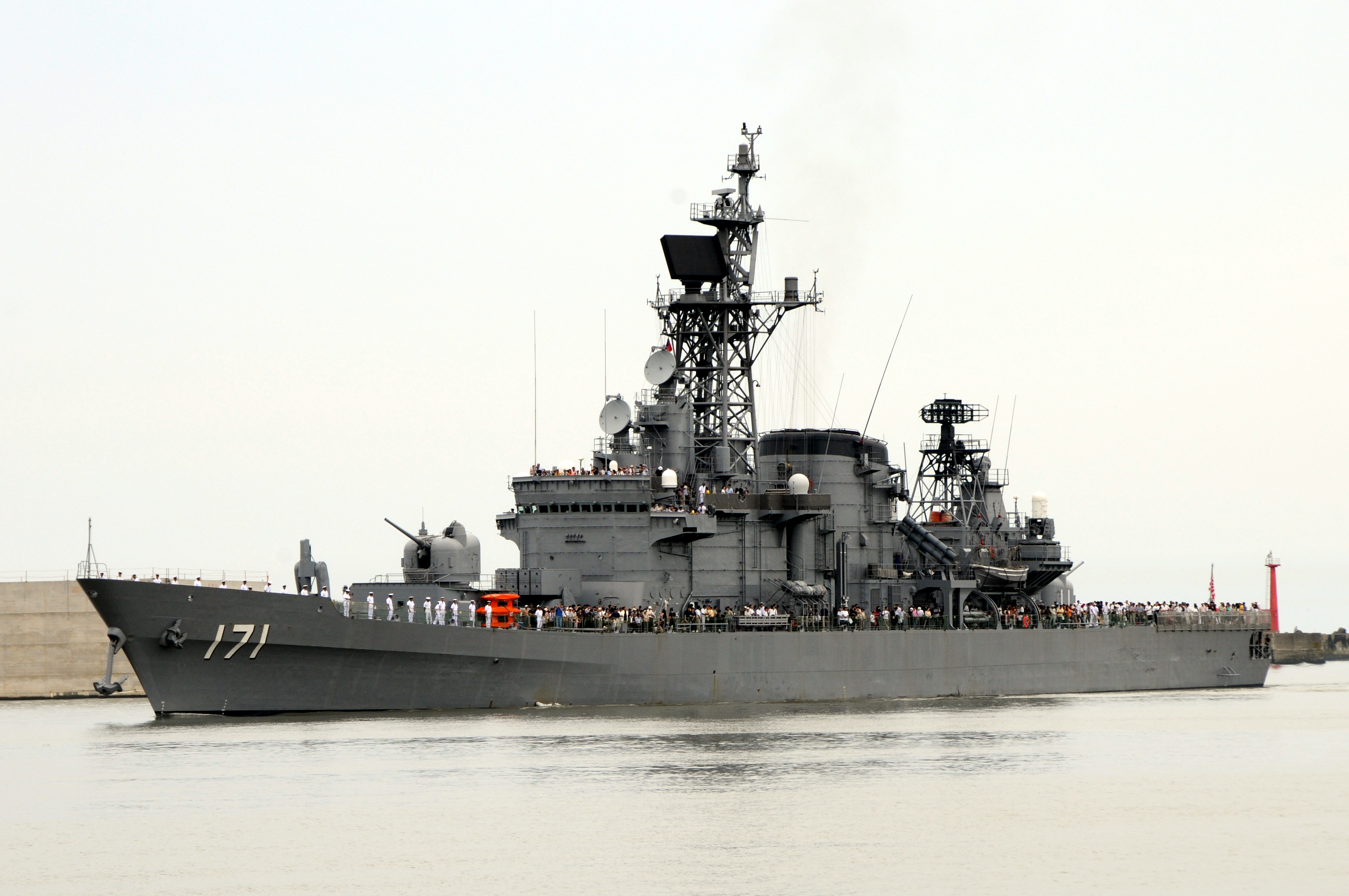
- JS Hatakaze (DDG-171) on 25 July 2009

History

Japan
- Name: Hatakaze; (はたかぜ)
- Namesake: Hatakaze (1942)
- Builder: Mitsubishi, Nagasaki
- Laid down: 20 May 1983
- Launched: 9 November 1984
- Commissioned: 27 March 1986
- Decommissioned: 17 March 2025
- Reclassified: Training vessel, 19 March 2020
- Home port: Yokosuka
- Identification: MMSI number: 431999503; Hull number: TV-3520
- Status: Retired

General characteristics
- Class & type: Hatakaze-class destroyer
- Displacement: 4674 tons standard; 6096 tons full load
- Length: 492.1 ft (150.0 m)
- Beam: 53.9 ft (16.4 m)
- Draft: 15.8 ft (4.8 m)
- Propulsion: 2 x Kawasaki/Rolls-Royce Spey SM1A gas turbines; 2 x Rolls-Royce Olympus gas turbines; 2 x shafts; 72,000 shp (54,000 kW)
- Speed: 30 knots (56 km/h; 35 mph)
- Complement: 260
- Sensors & processing systems: AN/SPS-52 air-search radar; OPS-11C air-search radar
- Armament: 2 x 5 in (130 mm) 54 caliber Mark 42 deck gun; 8 x Harpoon ship-to-ship missiles; 1 x SM-1MR Mk13 Mod4 ship-to-air missile launcher; 1 x ASROC Mk112 octuple launcher (anti submarine); 2 x 20mm CIWS; 2 x Type 68 triple torpedo tubes
- Aviation facilities: 1 × SH-60K helicopter

JS Hatakaze (DDG-171/TV-3520) was a Hatakaze-class guided missile destroyer built for the Japan Maritime Self-Defense Force (JMSDF). Hatakaze was the first vessel completed of her class, and she was the first JMSDF vessel to use gas turbine propulsion.

== Construction and career ==
Hatakaze was laid down on the 20 May 1983 at Mitsubishi Heavy Industries shipyard in Nagasaki. She was launched on 9 November 1984 and commissioned on 27 March 1986.

On 31 May 1994, Hatakaze, along with JS Kurama, Kongō, Asagiri, Yūgiri, Amagiri, Hamagiri, Sawagiri, Tokiwa, and Takashio, departed from Yokosuka Naval Base and participated in the RIMPAC 1994 exercise held in the waters around Hawaii from 23 June to 6 July.

She was converted to a training vessel on 19 March 2020 and was redesignated as TV-3520. On 18 August, a JMSDF MCH-101 helicopter successfully landed and took off from Hatakaze.

From 9 February to 16 March 2021, she participated in the open sea practice voyage of the 54th General Executive Candidate Course (internal course) students with the escort ship JS Yūgiri and the training ship JS Setoyuki. On 28 February, Hatakaze conducted joint training with USS Theodore Roosevelt and USS Bunker Hill in the sea and airspace around Guam.

== See also ==
- List of active Japan Maritime Self-Defense Force ships
