= Super Akizuki-class destroyer =

Projected class of destroyer

Class overview
- Name: Super Akizuki class
- Operators: Imperial Japanese Navy
- Preceded by: Akizuki class; Super Shimakaze class
- Planned: 16 (1941) + 7 (1942)
- Canceled: 23

General characteristics
- Type: Destroyer
- Displacement: 3,030 tons standard; 3,580 tons trial
- Length: 440 ft 3 in (134.19 m) (overall)
- Beam: 39 ft 4 in (11.99 m)
- Draught: 13 ft 7 in (4.14 m)
- Depth: 23 ft 9 in (7.24 m)
- Speed: 36.7 knots (68.0 km/h)
- Range: 8,000 nmi (15,000 km) at 18 kn (33 km/h)
- Armament: 4 × 2 3.9 in (100 mm) / 65 cal 10 cm/65 Type 98 naval guns DP guns; Some Type 96 25 mm AA guns; 5 or 6 × 24 in (610 mm) Type 93 torpedoes; Depth charges

The Super Akizuki-class destroyer (超秋月型駆逐艦 or 改秋月型駆逐艦, Chō Akizuki-class or Kai Akizuki-class) were a projected class of destroyer of the Imperial Japanese Navy (IJN), developed during the Second World War. The intention was to develop a faster destroyer based on the Akizuki class. The IJN Technical Department (艦政本部, Kansei-hombu) gave them the project number V7. However, the project was cancelled with none of the proposed ships being completed, because of the continued Japanese defeats.

== Ships in class ==
Ship	Ship #	Note
16 destroyers	770 to 785	Re-planned to 16 of Akizuki class (Ship # 5061–5076) on 30 June 1942.
Kitakaze (北風); Hayakaze (早風); Natsukaze (夏風); Fuyukaze (冬風); Hatsunatsu (初夏); Hatsuaki (初秋); Hayaharu (早春)	5077; 5078; 5079; 5080; 5081; 5082; 5083	Converted from Super Shimakaze class, cancelled on 9 June 1944

== Books ==
- Rekishi Gunzo, History of Pacific War Vol.23 Akizuki class destroyers, Gakken (Japan), 1999, ISBN 4-05-602063-9
- The Maru Special, Japanese Naval Vessels No.19 Destroyer Asashio class/Akizuki class, Ushio Shobō (Japan), 1978, Book code 8343–7
- Collection of writings by Sizuo Fukui Vol.5, Stories of Japanese Destroyers, Kōjinsha (Japan) 1993, ISBN 4-7698-0611-6
