= Hatakaze-class destroyer =

Guided-missile destroyer class in the Japanese Maritime Self-Defense Forces

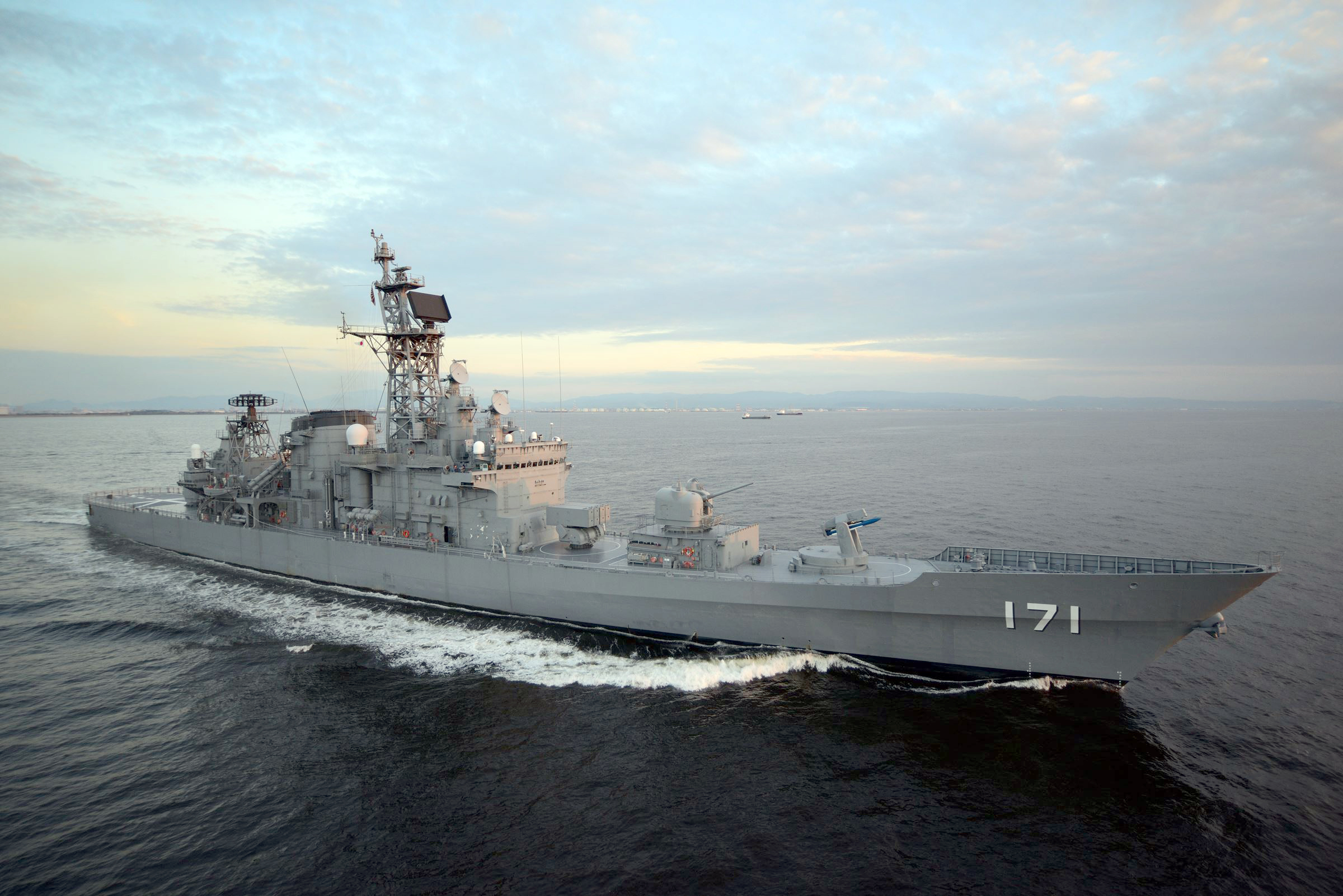
- Hatakaze (DDG-171)

Class overview
- Name: Hatakaze class
- Builders: Mitsubishi Heavy Industries; * Nagasaki Shipyard
- Operators: Japan Maritime Self-Defense Force
- Preceded by: Tachikaze class
- Succeeded by: Kongō class
- Cost: (Hatakaze) 61,980,000,000 JPY; (Shimakaze) 69,283,000,000 JPY
- Built: 1983–1988
- In commission: 1986–present
- Completed: 2
- Active: 1
- Retired: 1

General characteristics
- Type: Guided-missile destroyer
- Displacement: (Hatakaze); 4,600 long tons (4,674 t) standard; 6,000 long tons (6,096 t) full load; (Shimakaze); 4,650 long tons (4,725 t) standard; 6,050 long tons (6,147 t) full load
- Length: 150 m (492 ft 2 in)
- Beam: 16.4 m (53 ft 10 in)
- Draft: 4.8 m (15 ft 9 in)
- Propulsion: 2 × Kawasaki Rolls-Royce Spey SM1A gas turbines for cruising; 2 × Rolls-Royce Olympus gas turbines for high speed only; 72,000 hp (54,000 kW); 2 shafts
- Speed: 30 knots (56 km/h; 35 mph)
- Complement: 260
- Armament: RGM-84 Harpoon SSM; Standard missile MR SAM; ASROC anti-submarine rocket; 2 × 5"/54 caliber Mark 42 guns; 2 × 20 mm CIWS; 2 × Type 68 triple torpedo tubes

The Hatakaze-class of guided-missile destroyers is a third generation class of vessels in service with the Japan Maritime Self-Defense Force (JMSDF). They were the first of the JMSDF's ships to have gas-turbine propulsion.

The core weapon suite of the class is similar to that of the preceding Tachikaze class, but various improvements were made in many areas. Most notable are those that allow the Hatakaze-class to function as a group flagship. Normally, this duty resides with a larger type of ship, but, in case of their absence due to repairs, accident, or battle damage, the Hatakaze design allows for it to function as a command ship.

Hatakaze destroyers operate the OYQ-4-1 type tactical control system. Its weapon systems include the Standard missile surface-to-air missile, anti-submarine rockets, the RGM-84 Harpoon anti-ship missile, two Mark 15 20 mm CIWS gun mounts, two torpedo mounts in a triple tube configuration, and two 5 inch/54 caliber Mark 42 rapid-fire guns.

== Ships in the class ==
Building no.	Pennant no.	Name	Laid down	Launched	Commissioned	Decommissioned	Home port	Note
2311	DDG-171; TV-3520	Hatakaze	20 May 1983	9 November 1984	27 March 1986	17 March 2025	Yokosuka	Converted to training vessel (TV-3520) on 19 March 2020
2312	DDG-172; TV-3521	Shimakaze	13 January 1985	30 January 1987	23 March 1988		Sasebo	Converted to training vessel (TV-3521) on 19 March 2021

== See also ==
- List of destroyer classes in service

Equivalent destroyers of the same era

- Udaloy class
- Kidd class
- Almirante Brown class
- Rajput class
- Type 051D
