= Hydra =

Hydra generally may refer to:

- Lernaean Hydra, a many-headed serpent in Greek mythology
- Hydra (genus), a genus of simple freshwater animals belonging to the phylum Cnidaria

Hydra or The Hydra may also refer to:

== Astronomy ==
- Hydra (constellation)
- Hydra (moon), a satellite of Pluto

== Computing ==
- Hydra (chess), a chess computer
- Hydra (digital repository), an open-source digital repository software product later renamed Samvera
- Hydra (operating system), an early, discontinued, capability-based, object-oriented microkernel
- Hydra (software), a parallelized network login cracker built in various operating systems
- Hydra 100, a multi-GPU hardware solution
- HYDRA Game Development Kit, a development system by André LaMothe
- Razer Hydra, a game controller
- NEC HYDRAstor, a storage system

== Fictional entities ==
- Hydra (comics), a fictional supervillian organization in the Marvel Universe
  - Hydra (Marvel Cinematic Universe), an organisation in the Marvel Cinematic Universe based on the comics counterpart
- Hydra (Dungeons & Dragons), a fictional monster in D&D
- Hydra (Transformers), a character in Transformers
- The Hydra, a fictional organization in The Phantom
- Hydra, a character in UFO Ultramaiden Valkyrie
- The Hydra, a fictional deity created by Henry Kuttner
  - Mother Hydra, the co-ruler of the Deep One race in the Cthulhu Mythos
- The Hydra, a fictional fighter jet in Grand Theft Auto: San Andreas and Grand Theft Auto Online
- The Hydra, a fictional machine in Kirby Air Ride
- Hydra, a boss enemy in the video game Prototype 2
- Hydra the hydrogen truck, one of the 4 Fuel trucks from Starlight Express

== Film and television ==
- Hydra (film), a 2009 monster movie
- Hydra (Chuck), a fictional database on Chuck
- Hydra, a fictional Dharma Initiative station on Lost
- Habang Nilalamon ng Hydra ang Kasaysayan, 2025 Philippine drama film

== Music ==
- Hydra Entertainment, the hip-hop record label
- Hydra (band), an American southern rock band in the 1970s
- Hydra, an E.P. by British ambient duo Main, 1991
- Hydra (Otep album), 2013
- Hydra, an album by Satariel, 2005
- Hydra (Toto album), or the title song, 1979
- Hydra (Within Temptation album), 2014
- Hydra, an album by Iris, 2008
- Hydra, an instrumental track by Arch Enemy from Stigmata, 1998
- "Hydra", a song by Dir En Grey from Macabre, 2000
- "Hydra", a song by Twilight Force from Dawn of the Dragonstar, 2019
- "HYDRA", a song by Myth & Roid, 2018
- "The Hydra", a song by Le Sserafim from Antifragile, 2022

== People ==
- Hydra (skater), roller derby skater
- Hydra (wrestler), American professional wrestler
- Hydra, an alias of DJ and producer The Thrillseekers
- HyDra (Paco Rusiewiez), a French Call of Duty esports player and 2023 Call of Duty League season MVP

== Places ==
- Hydra, Algeria, a neighbourhood and a municipality in Algiers
- Hydra (island), an island of Greece

== Ships ==
- Hydra (ship), a hydrogen ship
- Greek ironclad Hydra, a French-built ironclad warship launched in 1889
- Greek destroyer Hydra, a Dardo-class destroyer launched in 1932
- Greek frigate Hydra, a MEKO 200-type frigate launched in 1992, lead ship of the Hydra class frigate
- HMS Hydra (1797), a 38-gun fifth rate
- HMS Hydra (1838), a wooden steam paddle sloop
  - Hydra-class sloop, a class of British steam sloops
- HMS Hydra (1871), a Cyclops-class turret ship
- HMS Hydra (1912), an Acheron-class destroyer
- HMS Hydra J275), an Algerine-class minesweeper launched in 1942
- HMS Hydra (A144), an oceanographic survey vessel launched in 1965
- Hydra-class minelayer, a class of Dutch 1910s minelayers
- HNLMS Hydra (A854), a Dutch Navy diving support vessel

== Other uses ==
- L'Hydre anarchiste (The Anarchist Hydra), an anarchist newspaper published in Lyon in 1884
- The Hydra, a literary magazine
- Hydra (association), a German self-help and advocacy group for prostitutes
- Hydra (video game), an arcade and Atari Lynx video game
- Hydra game, a concept in mathematical logic
- Hydra Market, a Russian language dark web marketplace that facilitated trafficking of illegal drugs as well as financial services
- Hydra the Revenge, a roller coaster at Dorney Park in Pennsylvania, US
- Hydra 70, an air-to-ground rocket
- Hydra Technologies, an unmanned aerial vehicle firm
- Hydra Trophy, a trophy of the roller derby WFTDA Championships
- Hydra, a wireless station during World War II at Camp X
- Operation Hydra (Yugoslavia)
- Operation Hydra (1943)

== See also ==
- Greek ship Hydra, a list of Hellenic Navy vessels
- HMS Hydra, a list of British Navy vessels
- Hydro (disambiguation)
- Hydrus, a small constellation in the deep southern sky
- Ghidra, reverse engineering software
