= List of hospitals and hospital ships of the Royal Navy =

HMHS is an acronym for His/Her Majesty's Hospital Ship.

== Early modern era ==
=== Seventeenth century ===
The earliest record of British hospital ship was Goodwill, which briefly accompanied a Royal Navy squadron in the Mediterranean in 1608 or 1609. From 1665 the Royal Navy formally maintained two hospital ships at any time, these being either hired merchant ship or elderly sixth rates, modified from their original design by the removal of internal bulkheads and addition of ports cut through the deck and hull for ventilation. The limit of two hospital ships at a time remained in place until the Nine Years' War at century's end. In 1691 there were four hospital ships in service, rising to five in 1693 and six in 1696.

In addition to their sailing crew, these seventeenth century hospital ships were staffed by a surgeon and four surgeon's mates. Standard medical supplies were bandages, soap, needles and bedpans, and patients were issued with a clean pair of sheets. Infectious patients were quarantined from the general population behind a sheet of canvas. The quality of food was very poor. In the 1690s the surgeon aboard Siam complained that the meat was in an advanced state of putrefaction, the biscuits were weevil-ridden and bitter, and the bread was so hard that it stripped the skin from patient's mouths.

Vessel name	Tons burthen	Guns	Crew	Hospital service
Goodwill	not recorded	not recorded	not recorded	1608 or 1609
Joseph	101	4	30-40	1665
Loyal Catherine (Note: Or Loyal Katherine)	298	36-40	35	1665-1666
Maryland Merchant	not recorded	41	40	1666
John's Advice	330	16	40-54	1672-1674
Unity	118	6-8	not recorded	1683
Welcome	78	10	not recorded	1683
Helderenberg	242	18-30	50	1688
Concord	352	22-30	45	1690-1695
Society	357	22-30	45	1690-1697
Baltimore	300/324	20	45	1691
Spencer	245	20	40-45	1691
London Merchant	250	22-30	30-45	1692-1696
Siam	333	22-30	45-58	1693-1697 (Note: Siam served as a hospital ship twice, from 1693 to 1697 and, after reconditioning, from 1702-1703.)
Bristol	532	20	40-45	1692-1694, 1696-1697
Josiah	664	30	30	1696
Muscovy Merchant	250	24	45	1696
London Merchant	250	22-30	30-45	1692-1696

=== Eighteenth century ===
Vessel name	Tons burthen	Guns	Crew	Hospital service
Lewis	460	42	50	1701
Suffolk (frigate)	477	8-30	50-70	1701, 1713
Siam	333	2-30	45-58	1702-1703
Antelope	550	24-30	60-83	1702-1703, 1706-1708
Princess Anne	484	24-30	70-83	1702-1706
Jeffreys	513	20-26	60-73	1702-1708
Sarah and Betty	370	24	45-58	1702-1703
Smyrna Factor	355	24	45-50	1702-1703, 1705-1709
Suffolk (hoy)	not recorded	10-30	80	1703-1704
Matthews	not recorded	not recorded	50-60	1705-1708
Martha	not recorded	22	70-80	1707-1710
Leake	not recorded	14	50-80	1708-1711
Arundel	not recorded	not recorded	not recorded	1709
Pembroke	not recorded	28	60-95	1709-1713
Delicia	not recorded	22	63-65	1710-1713
Looe	553	12-42	60	1717-1718
Portsmouth	not recorded	not recorded	not recorded	1731
Princess Royal	541	18	77	1740-1741
Scarborough	501	18	60	1740-1744
Jersey	1065	60	not recorded	1771-1779
Nabob	637	26	72	1779-1783
Lioness	711	26	72	1780-1783

== Boxer Rebellion ==
- HMHS Carthage
- HMHS Gwalior
- HMHS Maine

== Second Boer War ==
- HMHS Avoca
- HMHS Dunera
- HMHS Lismore Castle
- HMHS Maine
- HMHS Nubia
- HMHS Orcana
- HMHS Princess of Wales
- HMHS Simla
- HMHS Spartan
- HMHS Trojan

== World War I ==
- HMHS Aberdonian
- HMHS Agadir
- HMHS Albion
- HMHS Alexandra
- HMHS Anglia
- HMHS Aquitania
- HMHS Araguaya
- HMHS Assaye
- HMHS Asturias
- HMHS Berbice
- HMHS Brighton
- HMHS Britannic
- HMHS Cambria
- HMHS Carisbrook Castle
- HMHS Cecilia
- HMHS China
- HMHS Copenhagen
- HMHS Delta
- HMHS Devanha
- HMHS Dieppe
- HMHS Donegal
- HMHS Dongola
- HMHS Dover Castle
- HMHS Drina
- HMHS Dunluce Castle
- HMHS Dunvegan Castle
- HMHS Ebani
- HMHS Egypt
- HMHS Ellora
- HMHS Erin
- HMHS Erinpura
- HMHS Essequibo
- HMHS Formosa
- HMHS Galeka
- HMHS Gascon
- HMHS Glenart Castle
- HMHS Glengorm Castle
- HMHS Gloucester Castle
- HMHS Goorkha
- HMHS Grantala
- HMHS Grantully Castle
- HMHS Grianaig
- HMHS Guildford Castle
- HMHS Herefordshire
- HMHS Kalyan
- HMHS Kanowna
- HMHS Karapara
- HMHS Karoola
- HMHS Kildonan Castle
- HMHS Kyarra
- HMHS Lanfranc
- HMHS Letitia (1912), which served at Gallipoli.
- HMHS Liberty
- HMHS Llandovery Castle
- HMHS Loyalty
- HMHS Madras
- HMHS Magic II
- HMHS Maheno
- HMHS Marama
- HMHS Mauretania
- HMHS Morea
- HMHS Neuralia
- HMHS Nevasa
- HMHS Newhaven
- HMHS Oxfordshire
- HMHS Panama
- HMHS Plassy
- HMHS Queen Alexandra
- HMHS Rewa
- HMHS Rohilla
- HMHS Salta
- HMHS Sheelah
- HMHS Sicilia
- HMHS Somali
- HMHS Soudan
- HMHS St. Andrew
- HMHS St. Denis
- HMHS St. George
- HMHS ''St. Margaret of Scotland''
- HMHS St. Patrick
- HMHS Sunbeam
- HMHS Syria
- HMHS Tagus
- HMHS Takada
- HMHS Valdivia
- HMHS Varela
- HMHS Varsova
- HMHS Vasna
- HMHS Vita
- HMHS Wandilla
- HMHS Warilda
- HMHS Western Australia

== Russian Civil War ==
- HMHS Braemar Castle
- HMHS Garth Castle
- HMHS Kalyan

== Former Royal Naval Hospitals ==
- RNH Bighi (Malta)
- RNH Gibraltar
- RNH Haslar (Gosport England)
- RNH Mtarfa (Malta)
- RNH Portland (Portland England)
- RNH Simon's Town (South Africa)
- RNH Stonehouse (Devonport, England)
- RNH Hong Kong
- RNH Trincomalee (Trincomalee)

== World War II ==
- HMHS Aba
- HMHS Amarapoora
- HMHS Amsterdam
- HMHS Atlantis
- HMHS Brighton
- HMHS Cap St Jacques
- HMHS Chantilly
- HMHS Dinard
- HMHS Dorsetshire
- HMHS Duke of Argyll
- HMHS Duke of Lancaster
- HMHS Duke of Rothesay
- HMHS El Nil
- HMHS Gerusalemme
- HMHS Isle of Guernsey
- HMHS Isle of Jersey
- HMHS Karapara
- HMHS Karoa
- HMHS Lady Connaught
- HMHS Lady Nelson
- HMHS Leinster
- HMHS Letitia
- HMHS Llandovery Castle
- HMHS Maid of Kent
- HMHS Manunda
- HMHS Maunganui
- HMHS Naushon
- HMHS Newfoundland
- HMHS Oxfordshire
- HMHS Paris
- HMHS Prague
- HMHS St Andrew
- HMHS St David
- HMHS St Julien
- HMHS Tairea
- HMHS Talamba
- HMHS Takliwa
- HMHS Vasna
- HMHS Vita
- HMHS Wanganella
- HMHS Worthing

== Falklands War hospital ships ==
- HMS Hecla
- HMS Herald
- HMS Hydra
- SS Uganda

== RFA hospital ships ==
Royal Fleet Auxiliary hospital ships:

- RFA Maine (1887)
- RFA Maine (1905)
- RFA Maine (1902)
- RFA Maine (1924)
- RFA Argus (casualty receiving ship until 2024, not a hospital ship per Hague Convention X of 1907)
