= Hecla-class survey vessel =

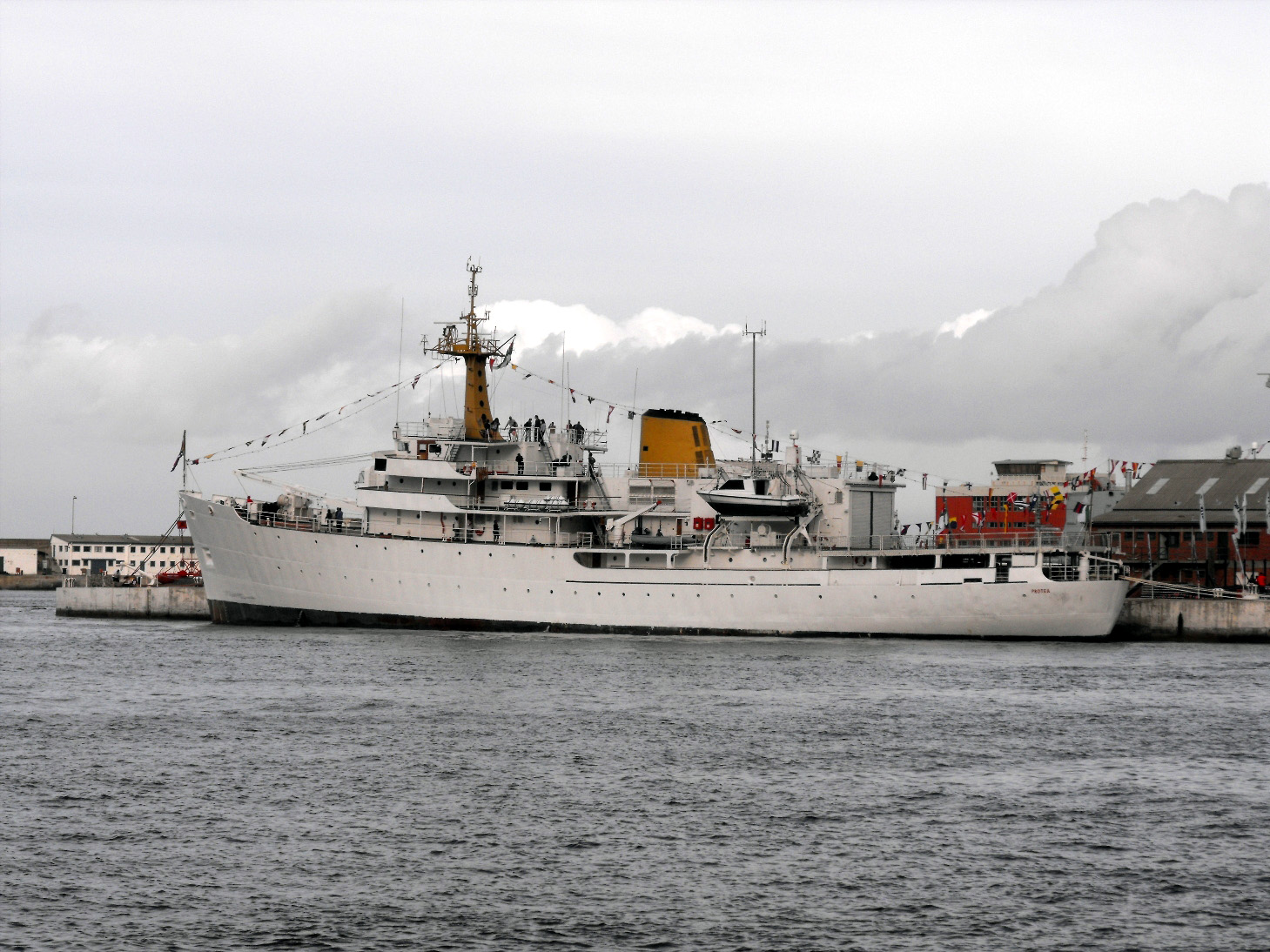
- SAS Protea at Cape Town in 2011

Class overview
- Operators: Royal NavySouth African Navy
- Cost: £1.25 million
- In commission: UK: 1966-2001; South Africa: 1972-present
- Completed: 5
- Active: 1
- Retired: 4

General characteristics
- Type: Deep ocean hydrographic survey vessel
- Displacement: 2,800 tons (originally 2,733 tons)
- Length: 260 ft (79 m)
- Beam: 50 ft (15 m)
- Draught: 16 ft (4.9 m)
- Propulsion: 3 × Paxman Ventura 12YJCZ 12-cylinder turbo-charged diesel-electric engines for the 2,000 shaft horsepower main propulsion; 2 × Paxman 6YJXZ auxiliary engines
- Speed: 14 knots (26 km/h)
- Range: 12,000 nautical miles (22,000 km)
- Boats & landing craft carried: 2 × 31 ft (9.4 m) surveying motor boats (SMB); 1 × 18 ft (5.5 m) SMB
- Complement: Generally a Commander (X)(H) in command (though sometimes a Captain RN), with 12-15 officers and 104-106 ratings, 1 NAAFI canteen manager, 1 laundryman
- Aircraft carried: 1 × Westland Wasp helicopter from 829 Naval Air Squadron
- Aviation facilities: Hangar, aft; Flight deck recognition letters were HD (Hydra), HE (Herald), HL (Hecla), HT (Hecate)
- Notes: 1 × Land Rover (with garage, forward)

The Hecla class formed the backbone of the Royal Navy's ocean survey fleet from the mid-1960s.

== Design ==
The hull design was based on that of the RRS Discovery and the Hecla class were built to commercial standards costing £1.25 million each. They carried two small survey craft, a launch, a Land Rover and a Wasp helicopter, for which there was a flight deck and hangar. They were chiefly funded from the Polaris Submarine Ballistic Nuclear Missile programme, with their major task to carry out regular oceanographic observations essential for the Polaris submarines to hide in thermal layers.

=== Special modifications ===
Besides the strengthened hull for work in ice and the provision of air conditioning necessary for work in all climates, they had modifications particular for a scientific vessel: wet and dry laboratories; a survey chartroom and photographic darkroom; oceanographic winches for deep seawater analysis and coring; stabilisers and a bow thruster, which enabled the ship to maintain her position when stopped for scientific observations. All 4 Royal Navy vessels were fitted with an Inertial Navigation System for mid-Ocean positioning. 'Drift' was corrected by taking satellite fixes from the Transit Doppler Sat Nav. Each vessel, due to their requirement to operate mid-Ocean, was equipped with a sick bay with a 2-bed ward and an operating theatre with X-Ray machine. Every vessel carried a Surgeon-Lieutenant and Leading Medical Assistant. In the 80's and 90's, 'Hecla' and 'Hecate' were equipped to make Gravity Free Air Anomaly observations over the mid-Atlantic ridge for the US Department of Defence 'Nav Star' GPS constellation of satellites.

== Ships in class ==
Name	Pennant No.	Builder	Laid down	Launched	Commissioned	Status
Royal Navy
HMS Hecla	A133	Blythswood Shipbuilding, Scotstoun	6 May 1964	21 December 1964	9 September 1965	Sold to private interests and renamed SV Bligh, 1997
HMS Hecate	A137	Yarrow Shipbuilders, Scotstoun	26 October 1964	31 March 1965	20 October 1965	Broken up at Pipavav, 1994
HMS Hydra	A144	Yarrow Shipbuilders, Scotstoun	14 May 1964	14 July 1965	4 May 1966	Sold to Indonesian Navy in 1986 and renamed KRI Dewa Kembar
HMS Herald	A138	Robb Caledon, Leith	9 November 1972	4 October 1973	22 November 1974	Sold to private interests and renamed SV Somerville, 2001; Broken up at Alang, 2004
South African Navy
SAS Protea	A324	Yarrow Shipbuilders, Scotstoun	20 July 1970	14 July 1971	23 May 1972	Active in service

== Service ==
The first three ships, HMS Hecla, HMS Hecate and HMS Hydra, were ordered in the early 1960s to replace the aging survey ships HMS Scott and HMS Shackleton.

A fourth ship, HMS Herald was ordered in the early 1970s. Apart from HMS Hecate, they all saw service as hospital ships in the Falklands War, while Herald and Hecla also served in the Gulf War and the former as a temporary Antarctic Patrol Ship in 1991 and 1992. Hecate saw service as the temporary Antarctic Patrol Ship in 1982 after being painted grey and fitted with AA guns in Gibraltar. Hecate was the first Royal Navy vessel to visit South America following the Falklands conflict. During the conflict, Hecla, commanded by Captain Geoffrey Hope RN, with Lt. Cdr. Ward as XO, ferried Argentinian prisoners of war to Montevideo. Being the first vessel of the conflict to be in the glare of the world media, she gained a high public profile out of proportion to her ambulance ship role. Hydra was also outfitted as an ambulance ship whereas Herald was equipped as a casualty reception station on a par with SS Uganda.

A fifth Hecla-class vessel, SAS Protea (A324) was ordered by the South African Navy and commissioned on 23 May 1972. As of 2017, Protea remains in service.

Hydra was sold to Indonesia Navy in 1986 and renamed KRI Dewa Kembar-932. As of 2017, Dewa Kembar remains in service.

Hecate decommissioned in 1990 and was broken up, while Herald was finally decommissioned in 2001, and was replaced the same year by HMS Echo.

Hecla was paid off in 1997 and sold to an Irish private company, renamed MV Blythe, to be replaced by HMS Scott. In 1969, commanded by Captain David Haslam (who retired after 10 years as Hydrographer in 1985), she landed a party who hoisted the Union Flag on Rockall, which significantly extended the UK's territory.

== Nomenclature ==
The first three ships in the class were named for the three paddle-wheel Hydra-class sloops, two of which (Hydra and Hecate) were fitted out as survey ships from around 1860.

== Gallery ==
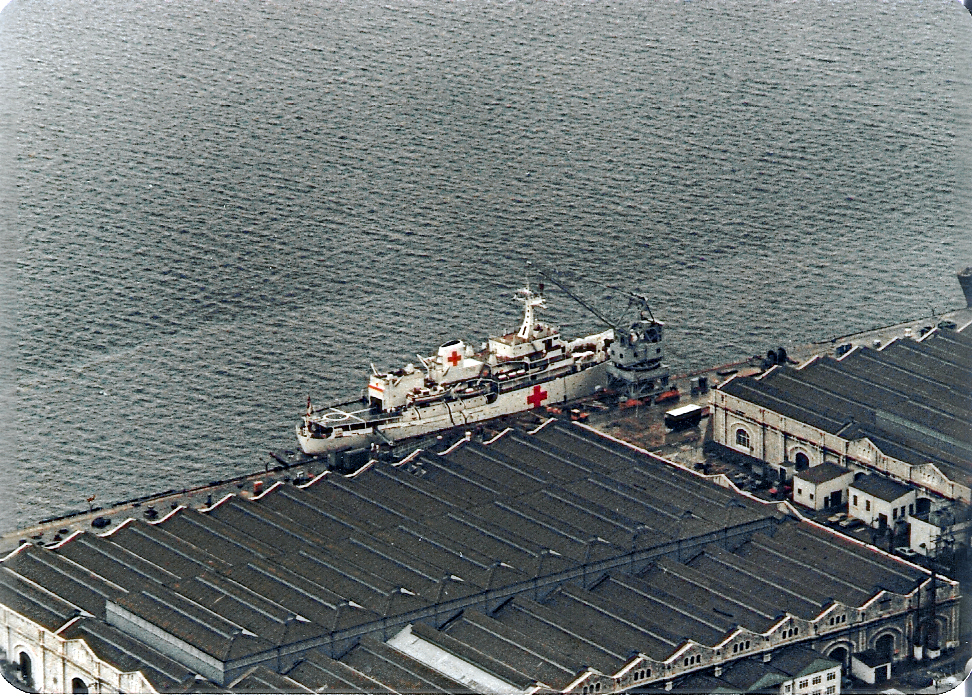
HMS Hecla being converted to an ambulance ship in HM Naval Base Gibraltar.

== See also ==
- List of survey vessels of the Royal Navy
