= HMS Herald (H138) =

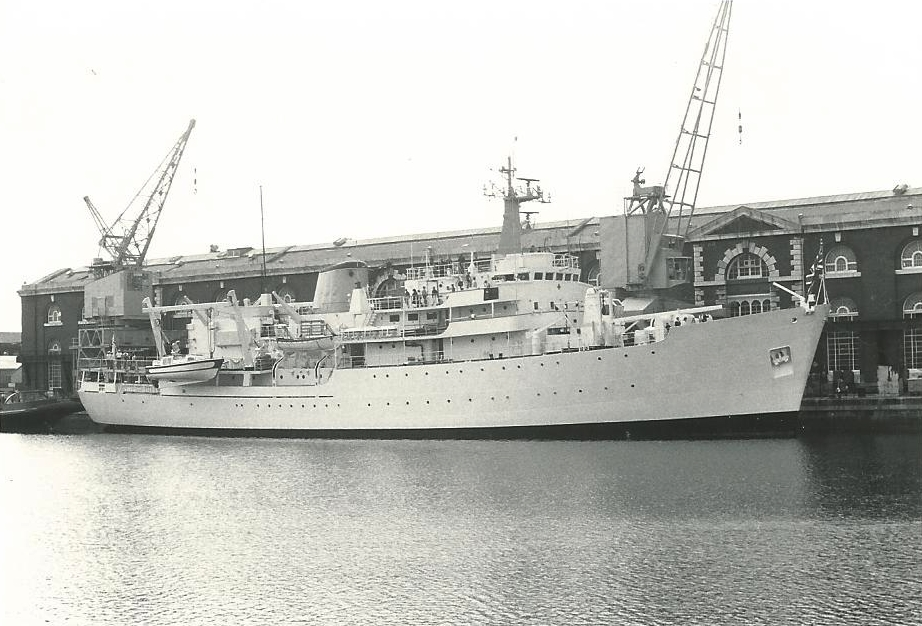
- HMS Herald

History

United Kingdom
- Name: HMS Herald (H138)
- Builder: Robb Caledon, Leith
- Laid down: 9 November 1972
- Launched: 4 October 1973
- Completed: 22 November 1974
- Commissioned: 1974
- Decommissioned: 31 May 2001
- Out of service: Sold to private hydrographic company in 2001
- Refit: Fitted with a strengthened and extended flight deck for Lynx helicopter, 1988
- Identification: IMO number: 7330349
- Fate: Scrapped in 2004.

General characteristics
- Displacement: 2,000 tons standard; 2,945 tons full load
- Length: 79 m (259 ft 2 in)
- Beam: 15.4 m (50 ft 6 in)
- Draught: 4.9 m (16 ft 1 in)
- Propulsion: Diesel-electric drive; 3 × Paxman 12 YJCZ diesels producing 2,434 hp; 1 electric motor producing 2,000 shp, driving a single shaft; Bow thruster
- Speed: 11 kn (20 km/h) cruise; 14 kn (26 km/h) maximum
- Range: 12,000 nmi (22,000 km) at 11 kn (20 km/h)
- Boats & landing craft carried: 2 × 35 ft (11 m) surveying motor boats
- Complement: 12 officers and 116 men
- Sensors & processing systems: Kelvin Hughes Type 1006 radar; Hydroplot Satellite navigation system; computerised data logging; gravimeter; magnetometers; sonars; echo-sounders
- Armament: None
- Aviation facilities: Helideck for 1 × Westland Lynx HAS 2/3

Service record
- Operations: Falklands War; Gulf War

HMS Herald was a Hecla-class ocean survey ship that served with the Royal Navy during both the Falklands War and Gulf War.

== Design and construction ==
The Hecla-class were designed as combined hydrographic and oceanographic survey ships, built to merchant ship standards and of similar design to RRS Discovery. Herald was the fourth ship of the class and was built to an improved design to the three earlier Heclas. She was laid down at the Robb Caledon's Leith shipyard on 9 November 1971, was launched on 4 October 1973 and completed on 31 October 1974. She had the Pennant number A138.

Herald was 260 feet 2 inches (79.3 m) long, with a beam of 49 feet 3 inches (15.0 m) and a draught of 15 feet 5 inches (4.7 m). Displacement was 2,000 long tons (2,000 t) standard and 2,945 long tons (2,992 t) full load. She had diesel-electric propulsion, with three Paxman Ventura 12-cylinder diesel engines rated at 1,280 brake horsepower (950 kW) powering two electric motors, rated at a total of 2,000 horsepower (1,500 kW) and driving one propeller shaft, giving a speed of 14 knots (16 mph; 26 km/h). She had a range of 12,000 nautical miles (14,000 mi; 22,000 km) at a speed of 11 knots (13 mph; 20 km/h). The ship had a complement of 128 officers and other ranks.

== Operational history ==
In January 1979, Herald, along with sister ship Hydra and the smaller survey ships Fawn and Fox, was carrying out survey operations off the coast of Iran when she was diverted to pick up about 60 British and American dependents from the port of Bandar Abbas in the wake of the Iranian Revolution.

During the Falklands War, Herald served as a Red Cross ship, ferrying casualties from San Carlos to Montevideo. During 1983 she served as a South Atlantic Guardship.

Following the Iraqi Invasion of Kuwait in August 1990, Herald was deployed to the Eastern Mediterranean as a support ship for the minehunters of the 3rd Mine Countermeasures Squadron. She continued to support the squadron after it moved to the Gulf, and was still on station when the Gulf War air campaign began in January 1991, but was relieved by sister ship Hecla.

In 1998 she located the wreck of HMS Russell, off Malta. The ship's pennant number changed to H 138 in 1998.

In December 2000, Herald answered a Mayday call and took part in a joint operation with the Royal Air Force to rescue the crew of the Cypriot ferry Royal Prince. The 35-metre ship sank in rough seas, but the crew were rescued by an RAF helicopter from RAF Akrotiri and landed on HMS Herald.

== Decommissioning ==
Herald was paid off on 12 April 2001 and decommissioned on 31 May 2001, having been replaced by the two new survey vessels of the Echo class, HMS Echo and HMS Enterprise.

After decommissioning, Herald joined her sister HMS Hecla in Waterford after a brief re-fit in Cork dockyard. She was renamed Somerville after Admiral James Somerville and was used for a hydrographic survey in Irish waters. The ship was sold in 2004 to Indian breakers and beached on 18 June of that year.

== Postage stamps ==
Herald appears on two stamps with Prince Andrew, Duke of York, issued by Saint Helena.
