= HMS Hecla (A133) =

Oceangoing survey ship in the Royal Navy

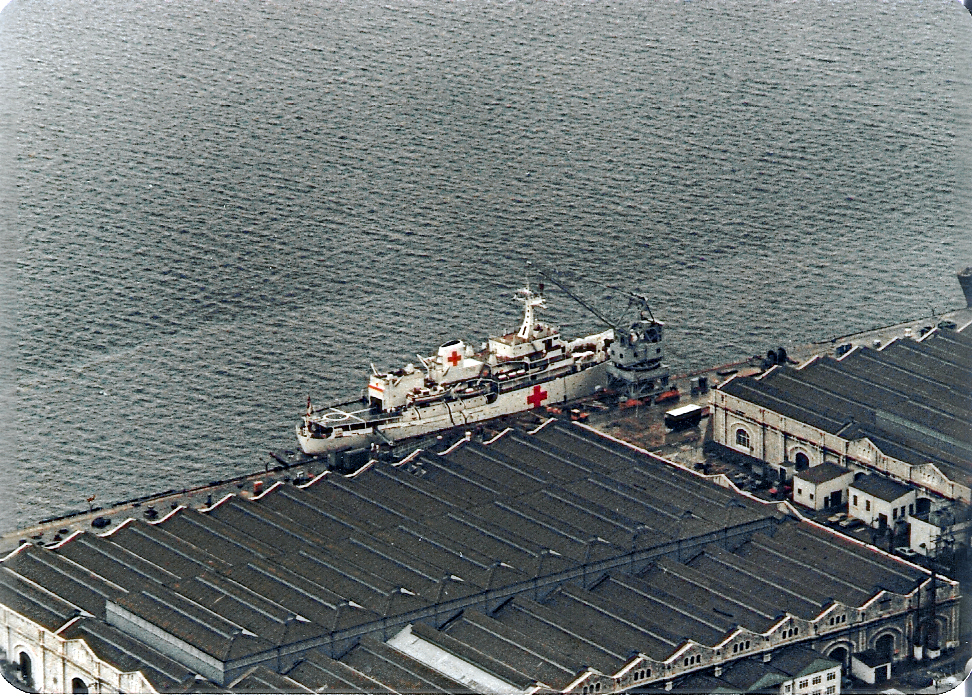
- Hecla at HM Naval Base Gibraltar, during conversion to a hospital ship for use during the Falklands War

History

United Kingdom
- Name: HMS Hecla
- Builder: Blythswood
- Laid down: 6 May 1964
- Launched: 21 December 1964
- Completed: 24 August 1965
- Commissioned: 9 September 1965
- Identification: Pennant number: A133; IMO number: 4902426
- Fate: Sold 1997

General characteristics
- Class & type: Hecla-class survey vessel
- Displacement: 2,800 tons full load
- Length: 79 m (259 ft 2 in)
- Beam: 15.4 m (50 ft 6 in)
- Draught: 4.9 m (16 ft 1 in)
- Propulsion: 3 × Paxman Ventura V-12 diesel engines
- Speed: 14 knots (26 km/h; 16 mph) maximum
- Range: 12,000 nmi (22,000 km; 14,000 mi) at 11 knots (20 km/h)
- Complement: 121
- Aircraft carried: 1 × Westland Wasp light helicopter

HMS Hecla was the lead ship of the Hecla class, an oceangoing survey ship type in the Royal Navy. She was ordered in the mid-1960s, along with her sister ships HMS Hecate and HMS Hydra. A fourth ship, HMS Herald, was completed in the early 1970s. The ship served for thirty years in this role, and various others, before finally being replaced by HMS Scott in 1997. Hecla was sold to private interests, being renamed "Bligh" after Vice-Admiral William Bligh. After this, the vessel was used in a hydrographic survey of Irish waters, and was based in Waterford, Ireland.

== Design and construction ==
The Hecla class were designed as combined hydrographic and oceanographic survey ships, built to merchant ship standards and of similar design to RRS Discovery. She was laid down at Yarrow Shipbuilders' Blythswood, Glasgow shipyard on 6 May 1964, was launched on 21 December 1964 and was commissioned on 9 September 1965. She had the pennant number A133.

Hecla was 260 feet 2 inches (79.3 m) long, with a beam of 49 feet 3 inches (15.0 m) and a draught of 15 feet 5 inches (4.7 m). Displacement was 1,915 long tons (1,946 t) light and 2,733 long tons (2,777 t) full load, with a gross tonnage of 2,898. She had diesel-electric propulsion, with three Paxman Ventura 12-cylinder diesel engines rated at 1,280 brake horsepower (950 kW) powering two electric motors, rated at a total of 2,000 horsepower (1,500 kW) and driving one propeller shaft, giving a speed of 14 knots (26 km/h; 16 mph). She had a range of 12,000 nautical miles (22,000 km; 14,000 mi) at a speed of 11 knots (20 km/h; 13 mph) and 20,000 nautical miles (37,000 km; 23,000 mi) at 9 knots (17 km/h; 10 mph). The ship had a complement of 127 officers and other ranks. She was fitted with a hangar and helideck aft to allow operation of a single Westland Wasp helicopter, while two surveying launches were carried.

the Hydrographer's three new survey ships were the first to be designed for significant work in addition to conventional hydrographic survey obtaining soundings for nautical charts. Their requirement included measurements of gravity and magnetism as well as depth with gravity measurements requiring accurate ship's speed relative to the ground as determined by frequent and accurate ship's position. The scale of navigation and data logging could only practically be done using computers. A system based on an Elliott 920B digital computer was installed and linked to the sensors, logging device and displays for those functions. The first installation was in Hecla in March 1968.

== Service ==
In 1982, Hecla was used as an ambulance ship for the duration of the Falklands War. In this role, she ferried wounded from both sides to the main hospital ship, SS Uganda.
