= HMHS Garth Castle =

Hospital ship during the First World War

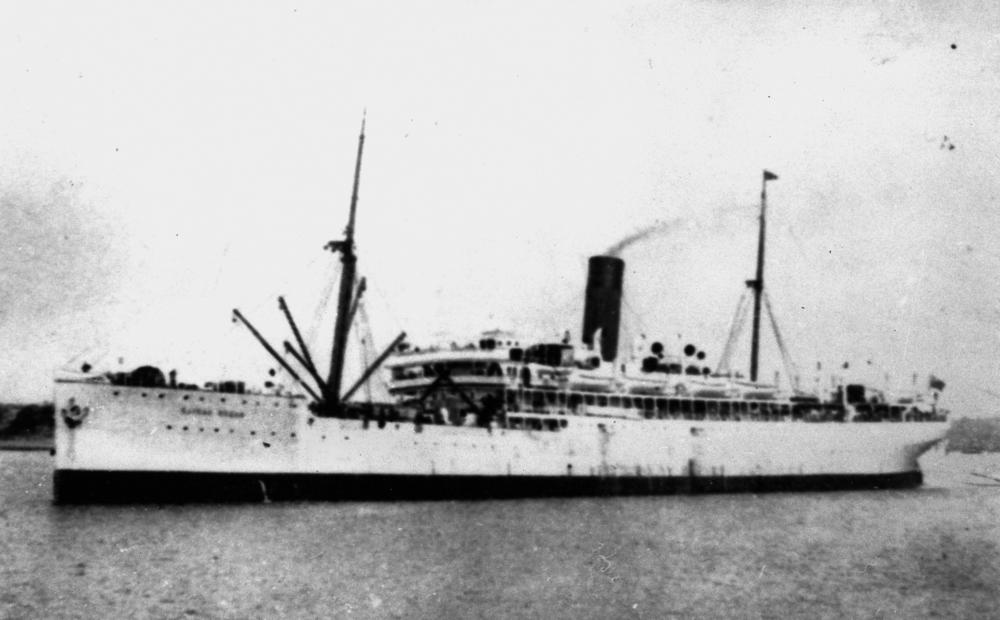
- Garth Castle before her conversion to hospital ship

History

United Kingdom
- Name: Garth Castle
- Namesake: Garth Castle
- Owner: Union-Castle Line (1910-1914, 1919-1939); Royal Navy (1914-1919)
- Operator: Union-Castle Line (1910-1914, 1919-1939); Royal Navy (1914-1919)
- Port of registry: (United Kingdom) London
- Builder: Barclay Curle, Glasgow
- Yard number: 478
- Launched: 13 January 1910
- Commissioned: 4 November 1914 (Royal Navy)
- Decommissioned: 24 October 1919
- Maiden voyage: April 1910
- In service: April 1910
- Out of service: 1939
- Identification: UK official number 129078; Code letters HQMP
- Fate: Broken up, 1939

General characteristics
- Type: Ocean liner (1910-1914, 1919-1939); Hospital ship (1914-1919)
- Tonnage: 7,612 gross register tons (GRT)
- Length: 452.6 ft (138.0 m)
- Beam: 54.3 ft (16.6 m)
- Depth: 30.7 ft (9.4 m)
- Installed power: 647 horsepower
- Propulsion: 2x quadruple expansion steam engine
- Speed: 13 knots
- Capacity: 250 casualties (hospital ship)

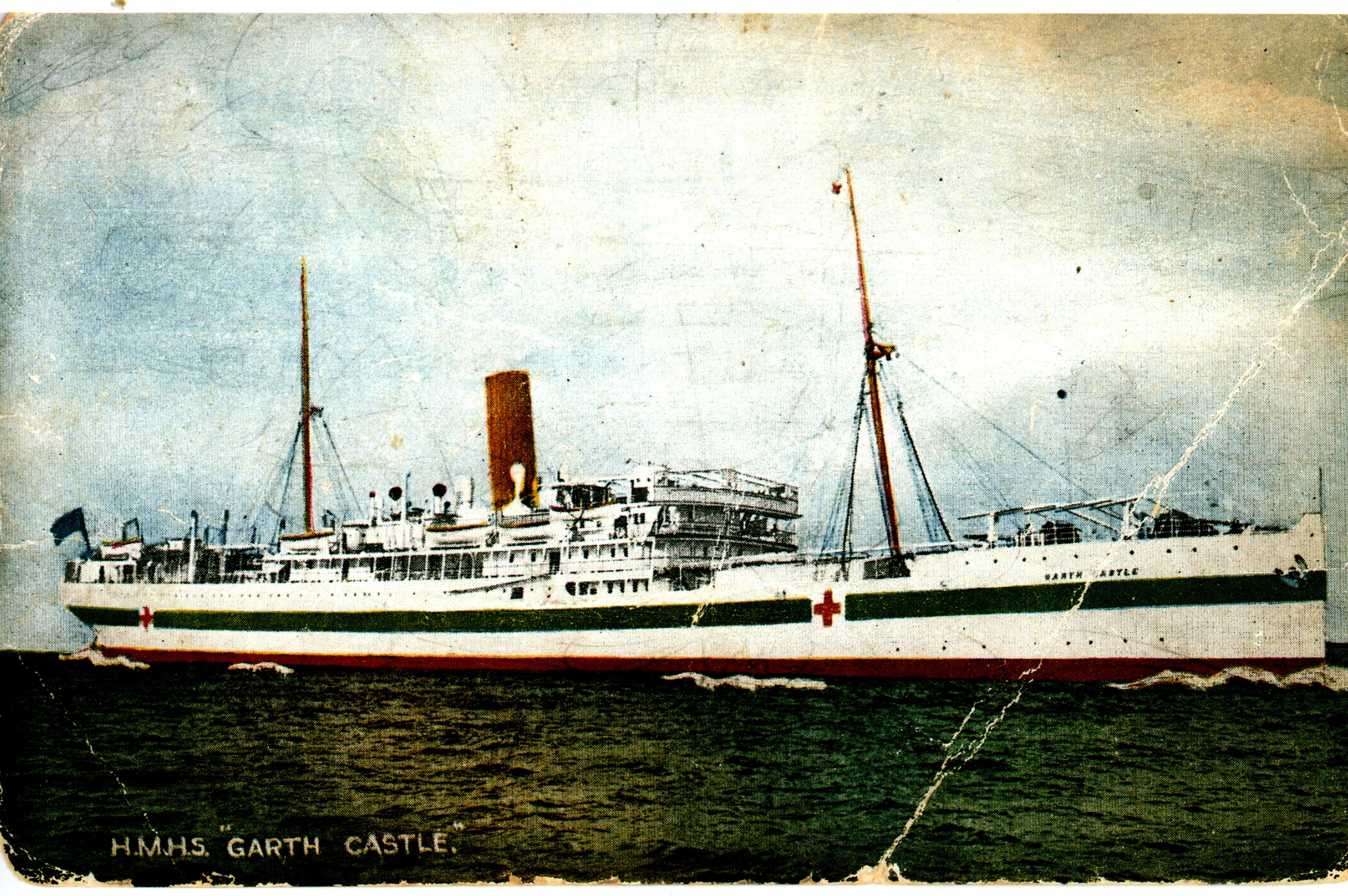

HMHS Garth Castle was a British ocean liner built for the Union-Castle Line in 1910 that served as a hospital ship in the Royal Navy during the First World War.

== Construction and prewar career ==
As the first decade of the 20th century drew to a close, Union-Castle Line chairman Sir Donald Currie ordered a pair of sister ships to be built at the Barclay, Curle & Company shipyard in Glasgow, Scotland for service on the company's intermediate service, carrying both passengers and refrigerated cargo to and from South Africa. The first of this pair, SS Grantully Castle, was launched on 14 October 1909, and her sister ship, Garth Castle, was launched just under three months later on 13 January 1910. Currie did not live to see either ship progress far into their construction, having passed away in April of 1909, with the pair being the last ordered under his supervision. Garth Castle entered service on the intermediate service in April of 1910 under the command of Captain G. K. Gandy.

== Wartime service ==
With the outbreak of the First World War in the summer of 1914, Garth Castle was commissioned into the Royal Navy on 4 November 1914, initially filling the role of an auxiliary ship, carrying personnel to their assignments at naval bases, but later being converted into a hospital ship with a capacity of roughly 250 casualties. The ship and her medical personnel were presented to King George V at a fleet inspection on 24 June 1917, and she also took part in the North Russia Intervention in 1918–19.

== Postwar career ==
In November 1918, hostilities came to an end, and Garth Castle was returned to her owners on 24 October 1919. On 25 March 1926, she ran aground in English Bay on Ascension Island before being refloated and brought to Cape Town for repairs. She was briefly laid up in 1931, and in 1939, she was sold to Hughes Bolckow of Blyth, Northumberland for scrapping, arriving on June 14th of that year.

== See also ==
List of hospitals and hospital ships of the Royal Navy
