= Hydro =

Hydro (from Ancient Greek: ὕδωρ, romanized: hýdōr, lit. 'water') may refer to:

== Energy technologies ==
- Water-derived power or energy:
  - Hydropower, derived from water
  - Hydroelectricity, in electrical form
- "Hydro", AC mains electricity in parts of Canada
- Micro hydro, a type of hydroelectric power that typically produces from 5 kW to 100 kW of electricity using the natural flow of water
- Pico hydro, a term used for hydroelectric power generation of under 5 kW
- Small hydro, the development of hydroelectric power on a scale suitable for local community and industry, or to contribute to distributed generation in a regional electricity grid

== Utilities ==
=== Australia ===
- Snowy Hydro
- Hydro Tasmania

=== Canada ===
- Canadian Hydro Developers (not specific to a province)
- In Manitoba:
  - Manitoba Hydro
  - Winnipeg Hydro, Manitoba
- In Ontario:
  - Hydro One
  - Ontario Hydro
  - Hydro Ottawa
  - Toronto Hydro
- Specific to other provinces:
  - BC Hydro, British Columbia
  - Newfoundland and Labrador Hydro
  - Hydro-Québec

=== Europe ===
- Norsk Hydro, in Norway
- Scottish Hydro Electric

== Other uses ==
- Hydro (fuel-station chain), in Sweden
- SF Hydro, former Norwegian railway ferry

=== Places ===
- Hydro, Kentucky, United States
- Hydro, Oklahoma, United States
- Hydro, Ontario, Canada

=== Personal names ===
- "Hydro", professional wrestler Jamar Shipman

=== Buildings ===
- Hydro, a term for a hydropathic establishment, often preserved in the names of hotels that no longer offer the water cure
- Hydro Majestic Hotel, New South Wales, Australia
- OVO Hydro, arena in Glasgow, Scotland

== See also ==
- Hydra (disambiguation)
- Hydroponics
