= HMS Hydra =

Seven ships of the Royal Navy have borne the name HMS Hydra, after the Lernaean Hydra of Greek mythology:

- HMS Hydra (1778) was a 24-gun sixth rate launched in 1778 and sold in 1783.
- HMS Hydra (1797) was a 38-gun fifth rate launched in 1797. She was used as a troopship from 1812 and was sold in 1820.
- HMS Hydra (1838) was a wooden steam Hydra-class paddle sloop launched in 1838, used as a survey vessel after 1852, paid off in 1868 and sold in 1870.
- HMS Hydra (1871) was a Cyclops-class turret ship launched in 1871 and sold in 1903.
- HMS Hydra (1912) was an Acheron-class destroyer launched in 1912 and sold in 1921.
- HMS Hydra (J275) was an Algerine-class minesweeper launched in 1942. She was damaged by a mine in 1944 and not repaired. She was scrapped in 1945.
- HMS Hydra (A144) was an oceanographic survey vessel launched in 1965, sold to Indonesia in 1986 and renamed Dewa Kembar.

== Battle honours ==
- Syria 1840
- Dogger Bank 1915
- Jutland 1916
- North Sea 1943
- Arctic 1943–44
- Normandy 1944
- South Atlantic 1982
