= Hydra Engine =

HYDRA Engine is a brand name for a multi-GPU developed by Lucid Logix. Similar to nVidia's SLI and ATI's Crossfire-technologies, Hydra allows linking several video cards together producing a single output and higher performance. Unlike SLI and CrossFire however, Hydra allows video cards from different chip manufactures to be linked together. Lucid claims it can do so with near to linear scaling of performance, i.e. two video cards equals twice the performance. The technology consists of both hardware on the motherboard and device drivers.

Currently there are two chips released under the Hydra Engine brand: Hydra 100 and Hydra 200. The basic concept behind the hardware is to intercept Microsoft DirectX or OpenGL sent to the video cards from the CPU and split these up to divide the calculation task fairly common amongst the present GPUs.

== Reception ==
SweClockers.com, when testing the MSI Big Bang Fusion which features Hydra 200, gave it very poor ratings citing the following: Poor drivers, poor game support, small if any performance gain over a single video card, graphical artifacts, unstable gameplay and a high price tag.

== See also ==
- Scalable Link Interface
- ATI CrossFire
