= HMHS China =

Hospital ship of the Royal Navy

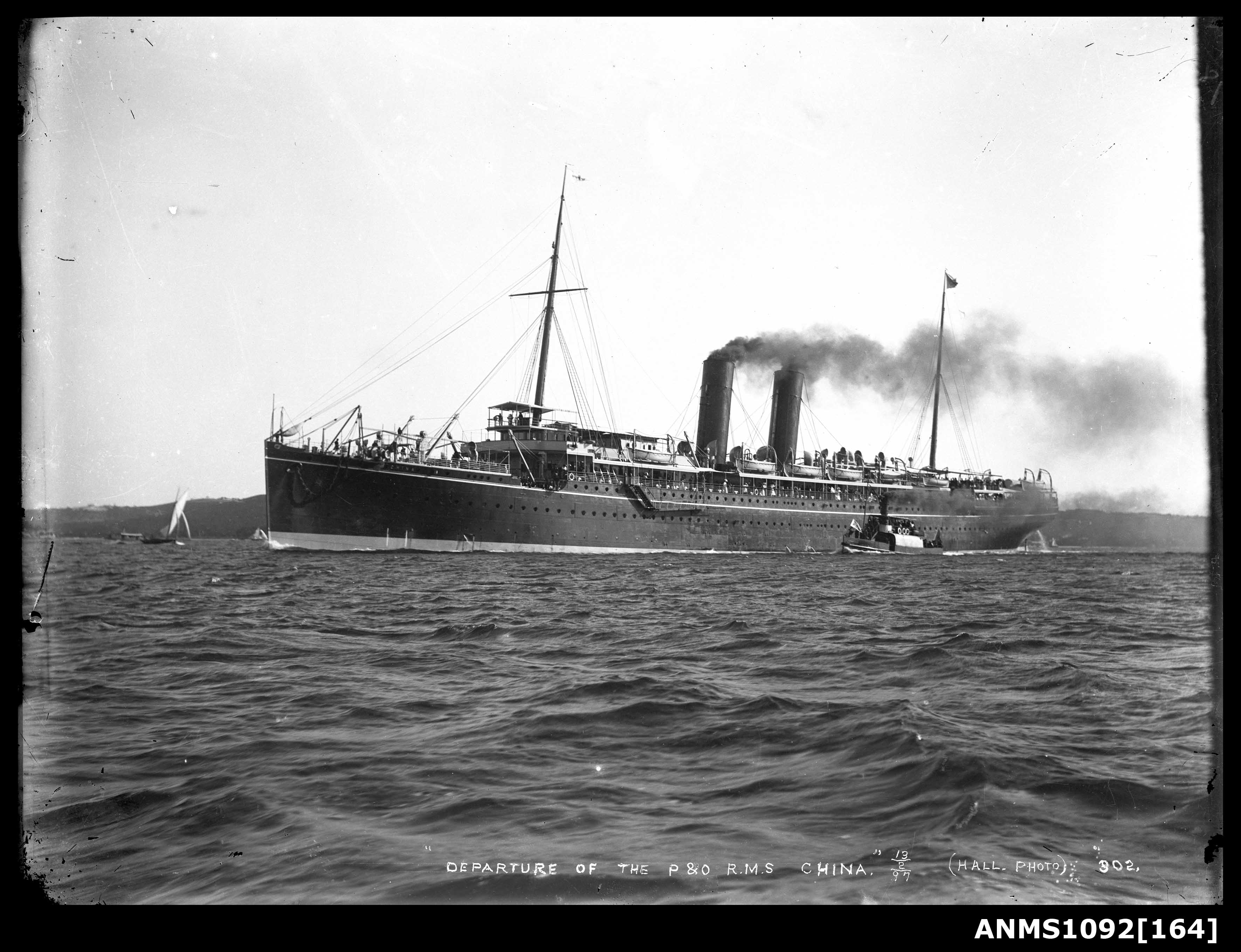
- RMS China in 1897

History

United Kingdom
- Name: China
- Owner: P&O
- Builder: Harland & Wolff Belfast
- Yard number: 299
- Launched: 13 June 1896
- Completed: 28 November 1896
- Fate: Scrapped 22 July 1928

General characteristics
- Tonnage: 7899 GRT

HMHS China was a hospital ship that served with the Royal Navy during the First World War. She was launched in 1896 for P&O as RMS China from Harland and Wolff in Belfast.

Four crew from the ship died after hitting a mine in a whaler while China was moored at Scapa Flow.

== See also ==
- List of hospitals and hospital ships of the Royal Navy
