= SS Nubia (1894) =

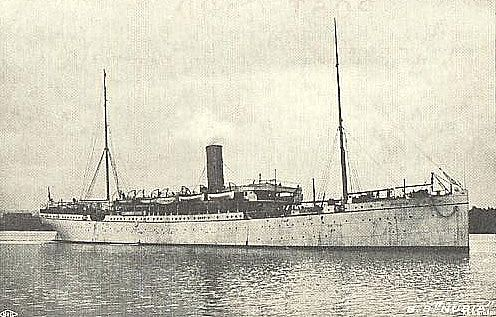
- SS Nubia in 1895

History

United Kingdom
- Name: Nubia
- Owner: P&O
- Builder: Caird & Company, Greenock
- Yard number: 276
- Launched: 13 December 1894
- Completed: 5 February 1895
- Maiden voyage: 1 March 1895
- Home port: Greenock
- Identification: UK Official Number 102394; Call sign NQWP
- Fate: Wrecked, 20 June 1915

General characteristics
- Type: Passenger-cargo ship
- Tonnage: 5,914 GRT; 3,845 NRT
- Length: 430 ft 0 in (131.06 m)
- Beam: 49 ft 3 in (15.01 m)
- Depth: 29 ft 9 in (9.07 m)
- Installed power: 662 Nhp
- Propulsion: Caird & Company 3-cylinder triple expansion
- Speed: 14 1/2 knots (16.7 mph; 26.9 km/h)
- Capacity: 90 first class; 62 second class

SS Nubia was a passenger-cargo steamer built for the Peninsular and Oriental Steam Navigation Company by Caird & Company of Greenock, Scotland, at a cost of £100,000 and launched on 13 December 1894.

== History ==
Originally named SS Singapore, she was 430 feet long and 49 feet 4 inches in beam, with a three-cylinder triple expansion steam engine and a top speed of 14.5 knots. She had a capacity of 90 first-class and 62 second-class passengers and also carried cargo.

Nubia began her maiden voyage on 1 March 1895 bound for Calcutta, India, but ran aground 18 days later in Banden Fukon Bay, Aden. She was refloated, repaired, and resumed operations. In January 1899, five crewmen of the North Lancashire Regiment died aboard Nubia after a cholera outbreak believed to have been caused by fruit taken on board in Port Said, Egypt. Between 1899 and 1903, Nubia was used for transportation and treating patients during the Second Boer War. She eventually was wrecked on 20 June 1915 in the Bay of Bengal about 0.5 miles (0.80 km) north of Colombo, Ceylon.

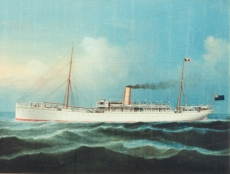
Nubia passenger cargo ship
