= Greek ship Hydra =

Five ships of the Hellenic Navy have borne the name Hydra or Ydra (Ύδρα), named after the island of Hydra, which played a major role in the Greek War of Independence:

- Hydra (1827–1831), a 26-gun sail corvette captured from the Egyptian fleet in 1827, destroyed in 1831 at Poros during a rebellion against Governor Ioannis Kapodistrias
- Hydra, a 433-ton steam gunboat built at the Black Wall Shipyard in England in 1891. It was armed with one fixed Krupp 270/30 gun and one small rapid-fire gun
- Hydra (1889–1918), a French-built ironclad warship
- Hydra (1932–1942), a Dardo-class destroyer
- Hydra (1992–today), a MEKO 200-type frigate, lead ship of the Hydra class frigate
