= HMHS Aberdonian =

British hospital ship

HMHS Aberdonian was a hospital ship which served with the Royal Navy during World War I and World War II.

== History ==
Originally the SS Aberdonian, she was built in 1909 by D&W Henderson in Glasgow, for the Aberdeen Steam Navigation Company. The ship was launched on 23 March; she was completed that May. In 1915 she was acquired by the Royal Navy and converted into a hospital ship, with the pennant number E80. After serving in both World Wars, the ship was sold to the Shaihin Steam Ship Company in 1946, and renamed Taishan Peak, then renamed again to Parviz two years later. The ship was sold for scrap on 1 December 1949 and broken up in Bombay in 1950.
