= SweClockers.com =

Swedish online magazine

SweClockers.com is a Swedish online magazine about computers and computer hardware, founded in 1999, with about 270,000 unique visitors per week and 200,000 registered users, as of August 2017. The website has one of Sweden's largests forums which is focused on computer hardware, software, modding and overclocking. Folding@SweClockers.com is the most successful Nordic team in the distributed computing project Folding@Home and has its own forum on the website.
