= HMS Hecate (A137) =

Royal Navy deep-ocean survey vessel of the Hecla class

History

United Kingdom
- Name: HMS Hecate
- Builder: Yarrows Yard, Scotstoun, Glasgow
- Christened: Lady Yarrow
- Decommissioned: 1990
- Home port: Plymouth
- Identification: A137

General characteristics
- Displacement: 2,800 tons full load
- Length: 79 m (259 ft 2 in)
- Beam: 15.4 m (50 ft 6 in)
- Draught: 4.9 m (16 ft 1 in)
- Propulsion: 3 × Paxman Ventura V-12 diesel engines
- Speed: 11 kn (20 km/h) cruise; 14 kn (26 km/h) maximum
- Range: 12,000 nmi (22,000 km) at 11 kn (20 km/h)
- Complement: 121 (13 officers and 6 scientists)
- Armament: 2 × Oerlikon 20 mm guns
- Aircraft carried: 1 × Westland Wasp light helicopter
- Aviation facilities: Hangar workshop rear of flight deck

Service record
- Operations: Falklands War

HMS Hecate (A137) was a Royal Navy deep ocean survey vessel of the Hecla class. She was present at the "presentation of fleet colours" review in Torbay on 29 July 1969. The ship was decommissioned in 1990.

== Design and construction ==
The Hecla class were designed as combined hydrographic and oceanographic survey ships, built to merchant ship standards and of similar design to RRS Discovery. She was laid down at Yarrow Shipbuilders' Scotstoun shipyard on 26 October 1964, was launched on 31 March 1965 and was commissioned on 20 December 1965. She had the pennant number A137.

Hecate was 260 feet 2 inches (79.3 m) long, with a beam of 49 feet 3 inches (15.0 m) and a draught of 15 feet 5 inches (4.7 m). Displacement was 1,915 long tons (1,946 t) light and 2,733 long tons (2,777 t) full load, with a gross tonnage of 2,898. She had diesel-electric propulsion, with three Paxman Ventura 12-cylinder diesel engines rated at 1,280 brake horsepower (950 kW) powering two electric motors, rated at a total of 2,000 horsepower (1,500 kW) and driving one propeller shaft, giving a speed of 14 knots (26 km/h; 16 mph). She had a range of 12,000 nautical miles (22,000 km; 14,000 mi) at a speed of 11 knots (20 km/h; 13 mph) and 20,000 nautical miles (37,000 km; 23,000 mi) at 9 knots (17 km/h; 10 mph). The ship had a complement of 127 officers and other ranks. She was fitted with a hangar and helideck aft to allow operation of a single Westland Wasp helicopter, while two surveying launches were carried.

== History ==
On 21 April 1971, two launches attached to HMS Hecate were towed out to sea and bombed by the Provisional Irish Republican Army while the vessels were moored at Baltimore, Republic of Ireland. One of the launches, Stork, was wrecked, while the other boat, Puffin, survived with minor damage. HMS Hecate was carrying out a hydrographic survey in collaboration with the government of the Republic.

In the mid-1970s HMS Hecate was in the Persian Gulf surveying the entrance areas in the event of conflicts while based in Bandar Abbas, Iran.

In November 1981 while on a routine visit to Nantes, France, an attempt was made to sink the vessel using a bomb placed on the hull by divers. The detonator went off in the early hours of the morning, but the explosive failed to detonate. French IRA sympathisers calling themselves "the Bobby Sands Committee" later claimed responsibility. Hecate was undamaged and conducted North Atlantic surveys for the next 4 months, visiting Gibraltar, Tangiers, Madeira and Lisbon.

In June 1982, during the Falklands War, while her sister ship were used as hospital ships, Hecate was painted grey and given an armament of two 20 mm guns and Blowpipe surface-to-air missiles. On 23 July, after the ceasefire had ended the fighting, Hecate was sent to the South Atlantic to relieve HMS Endurance as Ice Patrol Ship while Endurance returned to Britain for a refit. Hecate conducted patrols and surveys in the South Atlantic. A survey was made at Mare Harbour in East Falkland, which later became the port facilities for RAF Mount Pleasant. A survey was also made of the Bay of Isles, South Georgia. Hecate visited British Antarctic Survey bases and spent Christmas in Grytviken, South Georgia, where the crew attended a candlelit Christmas mass in the settlement's old whaling church. The New Year was spent at the Falkland Islands before Hecate became the first Royal Navy ship to visit South America following the hostilities. Hecate embarked a Chilean pilot at Punta Arenas before sailing to Talcahuano, Chile via the Patagonian Channel. Following a brief visit, Hecate took passage through the Panama Canal for a four-day visit to Antigua. Hecate returned to the UK in February, 1983.
