= HMS Scott (H131) =

1997 Ocean survey vessel of the Royal Navy

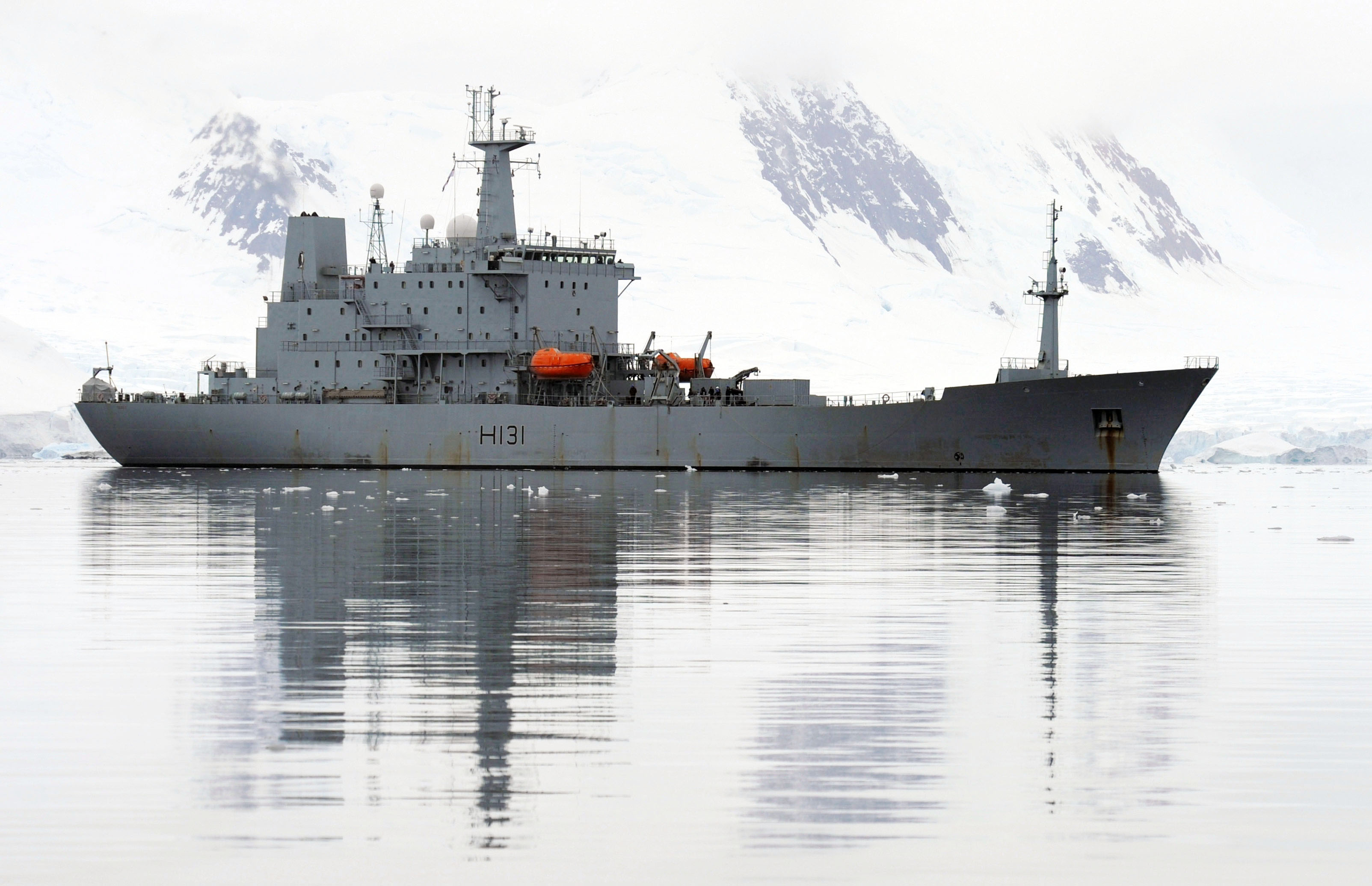
- HMS Scott at the British Antarctic Territory, 2010

History

United Kingdom
- Name: HMS Scott
- Operator: Royal Navy
- Ordered: 20 January 1995
- Builder: Appledore Shipbuilders, Bideford (Subcontracted from BAeSEMA)
- Launched: 13 October 1996
- Commissioned: 30 June 1997
- Refit: Major 2013-2014
- Home port: HMNB Devonport, Plymouth
- Identification: Pennant number: H131; International call sign: GCUP; IMO number: 9127289; MMSI number: 233844000
- Status: in active service
- Badge

General characteristics
- Class & type: Scott-class ocean survey vessel
- Displacement: 13,500 t (13,300 long tons; 14,900 short tons)
- Length: 131.1 m (430 ft)
- Beam: 21.5 m (71 ft)
- Draught: 8.3 m (27 ft)
- Propulsion: 2 × Krupp MaK 9M32 9-cylinder diesel engines; Single shaft with controllable-pitch propeller; Retractable bow thruster
- Speed: 18 knots (33 km/h; 21 mph)
- Complement: 78
- Sensors & processing systems: Kelvin Hughes ARPA 1626, I-band navigation radar; Sonar array sounding system (SASS); Proton magnetometer; Sonar 2090 ocean environment sensor; SASS IV multibeam depth-sounder

HMS Scott is an ocean survey vessel of the Royal Navy, and the only vessel of her class. She is the third Royal Navy ship to carry the name, and the second to be named after the Antarctic explorer, Robert Falcon Scott. She was ordered to replace the survey ship HMS Hecla.

== Construction ==
The ship was ordered from BAeSEMA in 1995 to replace the ageing HMS Hecla. She was built at the Appledore Shipbuilders in North Devon and launched on 13 October 1996 by Mrs Carolyn Portillo, wife of Michael Portillo, the then-Secretary of State for Defence. She was commissioned on 20 June 1997. Not only is she the largest vessel in the Royal Navy's Hydrographic Squadron, and the fifth largest in the entire surface fleet, but she is also the largest survey vessel in Western Europe.

== Role ==
Scott is the Royal Navy's only ocean survey vessel. She can remain at sea for up to 300 days a year, thanks to her crew rotation system. Her complement of 78 is divided into three sections: two sections are required to keep the ship operational, with the third on shore on leave or in training. When the ship returns to port, one crew section on board is replaced by the section on shore. The ship can then deploy again almost immediately. As with all of the Royal Navy's large survey vessels, Scott has an auxiliary role in support of mine countermeasure vessels.

== Service ==
In February 2005 Scott surveyed the seabed around the 2004 Indian Ocean earthquake, which varies in depth between 1,000 m (3,300 ft) and 5,000 m (16,000 ft). The survey, conducted using a high-resolution, multi-beam sonar system, revealed that the earthquake had made a huge impact on the topography of the seabed.

In September 2006, Scott was granted the Freedom of the City of Swansea. From August 2008 until June 2009 she was refitted in Portsmouth.

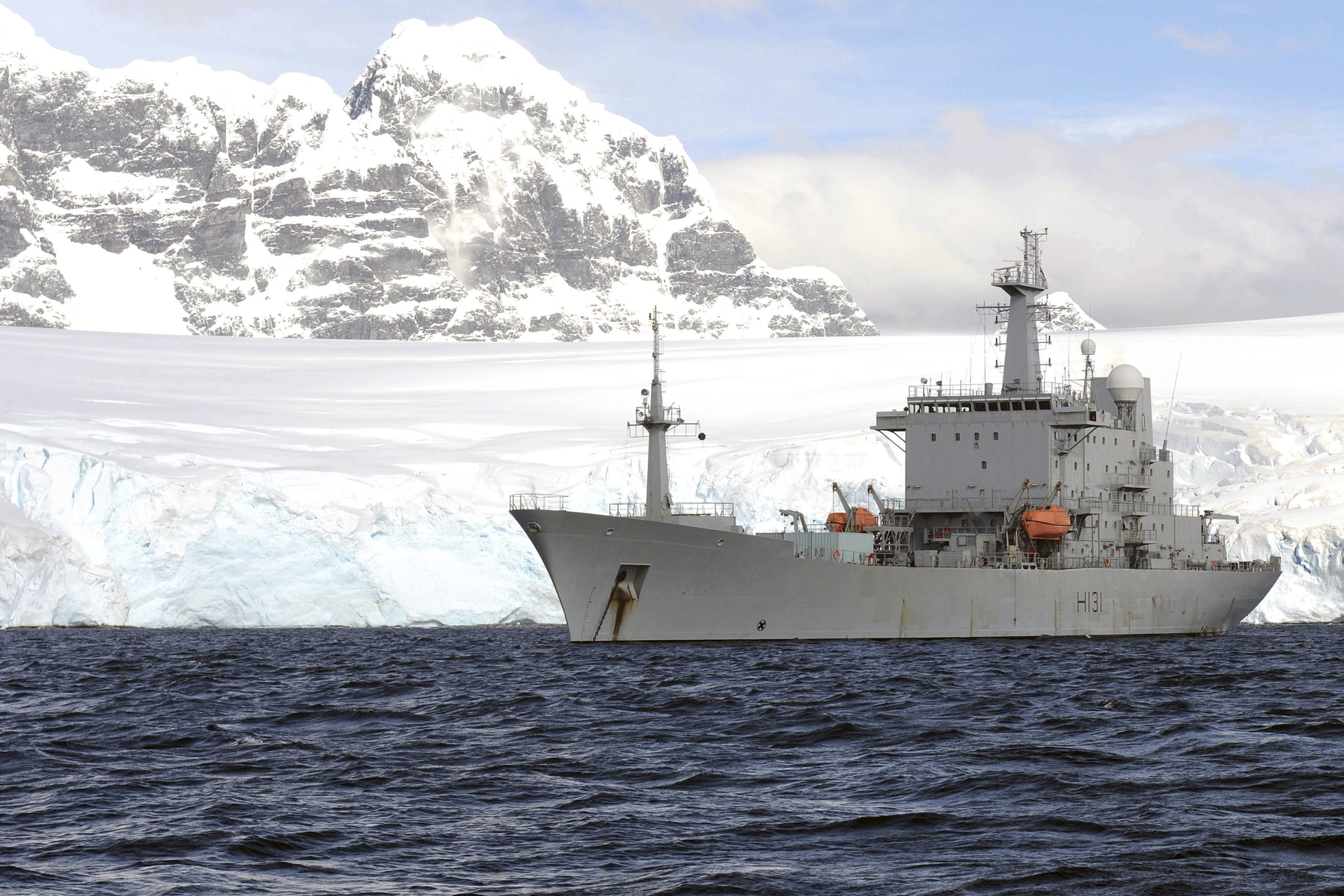
HMS Scott at anchor near Port Lockroy in the Antarctic

On 26 October 2009 and again on 25 November 2010 the ship deployed to the South Atlantic and Antarctic to cover for the non-availability of the Royal Navy icebreaker HMS Endurance. In February 2010, Scott hosted artist Rowan Huntley for a month in Antarctica, in a new artist-in-residence programme for the Royal Navy inaugurated by the Friends of the Scott Polar Research Institute (SPRI).

In June 2010, the ship visited Cardiff to mark the centenary of Robert Falcon Scott's departure from Cardiff on 15 June 1910 for the South Pole, at the start of the Terra Nova Expedition. In February 2011, Scott hosted Dafila Scott, Scott's granddaughter, in Antarctica for a month as the Friends of the SPRI's second artist-in-residence.

The ship returned to Devonport in April 2011. With the task of Antarctic patrol taken over by HMS Protector in that year, Scott left Devonport in September to resume deep-water surveying, initially in the Atlantic. From November 2013 to June 2014 her most extensive refit to date took place, in Devonport. This included coating the hull with Hempasil X3 non-toxic anti-fouling paint, which is expected to increase her fuel efficiency.

The Ministry of Defence stated in October 2017 that the planned out-of-service date for Scott was to be 2022. In February 2022, it was indicated that the out of service date would be extended to 2023. In March 2023, and in advance of her purported decommissioning, the Defence Equipment Sales Authority (DESA) listed HMS Scott as for sale. However, in May 2023 it was reported that she would receive a major life extension refit and her service life would now be extended up to 2033 when she is likely to be replaced by the second Multi-Role Ocean Surveillance Ship which may be a new-build vessel for the Royal Fleet Auxiliary. In the interim, HMS Scott underwent a shorter maintenance period in Gibraltar to continue operations during 2023.

She visited the United States in 2023 participating in US Navy Fleet Week from the 24th to the 29th May. From there she visited Portsmouth, New Hampshire where her ship's company participated in the Portsmouth 400th anniversary celebrations. The ship's company also visited the Portsmouth Naval Shipyard Cemetery. On 3rd June, 2023 they participated in a Remembrance Service organised by the British & Commonwealth Remembrance Project laying a wreath at the Commonwealth War Graves Commission Royal Navy graves at Portsmouth Naval Shipyard Cemetery.

It has been reported that Scott would now carry at least one of the new 11-metre survey module variants of the Sea-class workboats being procured for various tasks in the Royal Navy. In late 2024, Scott entered refit at A&P Falmouth to extend her service life to the early 2030s. Post-refit, the ship returned to sea in June 2026.

== Affiliations ==
- 42 Engineer Group (Geographic), Royal Engineers
- City and County of Swansea
- Plymouth Child Development Centre (Scott Hospital, Plymouth)
- TS Scott - Maidstone Sea Cadets
- The Captain Scott Society
- The Worshipful Company of Water Conservators
- Newcastle-under-Lyme School CCF
