= SS Kalyan =

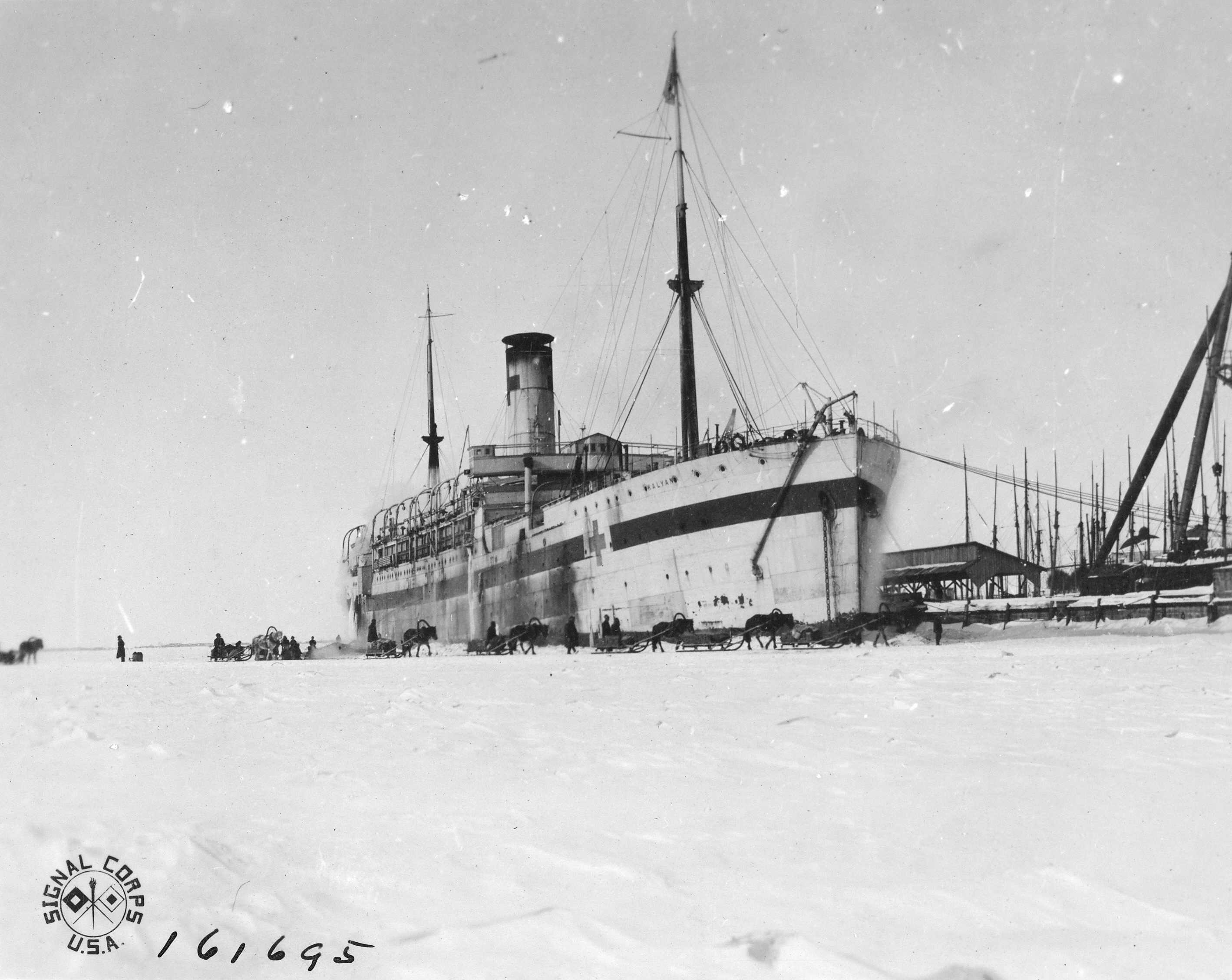

History

United Kingdom
- Name: SS Kalyan
- Operator: Royal Navy (1915—1919) P & O (1919–1932)
- Builder: Cammell Laird, Birkenhead
- Laid down: 1914
- Launched: 24 September 1914
- Out of service: 1932
- Fate: Sold to Japanese ship breakers, 12 February 1932

General characteristics
- Type: Troop ship (1915–1918); Hospital ship (1918–1919); Passenger-cargo ship (1919–1932)
- Tonnage: 9,144 GRT
- Length: 480.6 ft (146.5 m)
- Beam: 58.2 ft (17.7 m)
- Height: 37.7 ft (11.5 m)
- Propulsion: 2 screws producing 7,040 hp (5.25 MW)

SS Kalyan was a ship operated by the P & O shipping line between 1915 and 1932.

== Wartime Service ==
Kalyan was used as a troop ship between England, Egypt and Salonika. She was then refitted as a hospital ship and dispatched to North Russia in October 1918. After a 12-day voyage she arrived in Archangel. There she acted as a temporary base hospital for British, Canadian, French, Italian, Chinese and Russian sick and wounded. The ship remained there throughout the winter, with ice having to be broken each day to prevent damage through "pinching".

She returned to Leith in June 1919. Many of her crew were Muslim Lascars who had problems during Ramadan 1919, as they were above the Arctic Circle and the sun did not set. General Ironside gave them dispensation from observing the Ramadan fast.

== Sister ships ==
- SS Karmala
- SS Kashgar
- SS Kashmir
- SS Khiva
- SS Khyber
