= HMS Hydra (A144) =

Royal Navy deep ocean hydrographic survey vessel

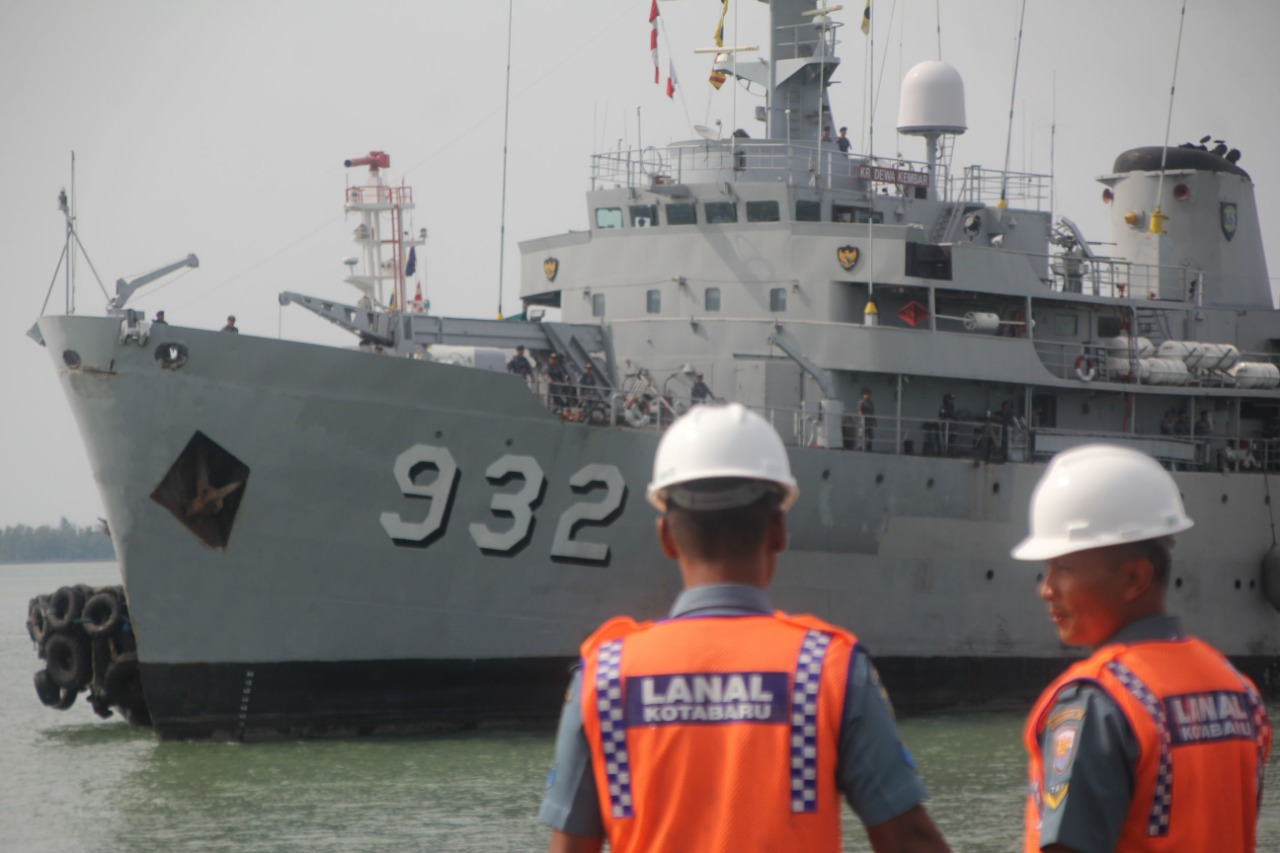
- KRI Dewa Kembar (932) as of August 2019

History

United Kingdom
- Name: HMS Hydra
- Builder: Yarrow Shipbuilders, Scotstoun
- Yard number: 2258
- Laid down: 14 May 1964
- Launched: 14 July 1965
- Commissioned: 4 May 1966
- Decommissioned: 1986
- Identification: Pennant number: A144; IMO number: 6519340
- Motto: Ut Herculis Perseverantia; ("Like Hercules Persevere")
- Fate: Sold to the Indonesian Navy, 1986

Indonesia
- Name: KRI Dewa Kembar
- Namesake: Aśvins
- Acquired: 1986
- Identification: Pennant number: 932; IMO number: 6519340
- Status: in active service, as of 2019

General characteristics
- Class & type: Hecla-class survey vessel
- Displacement: 2,000 tons standard; 2,945 tons full load
- Length: 79 m (259 ft 2 in)
- Beam: 15.4 m (50 ft 6 in)
- Draught: 4.9 m (16 ft 1 in)
- Propulsion: Diesel-electric drive; 3 × Paxman 12 YJCZ diesels producing 2,434 hp; 1 electric motor producing 2,000 shp (1,500 kW), driving a single shaft; Bow thruster
- Speed: 11 kn (20 km/h) cruise; 14 kn (26 km/h) maximum
- Range: 12,000 nmi (22,000 km) at 11 kn (20 km/h)
- Boats & landing craft carried: 2 × 35 ft (11 m) surveying motor boats
- Complement: 12 officers and 116 men
- Sensors & processing systems: Kelvin Hughes Type 1006 radar; Hydroplot Satellite navigation system; computerised data logging; gravimeter; magnetometers; sonars; echo-sounders
- Armament: 2 × 2M-1 Twin DShK 1938/46 (in Indonesian navy service)
- Aircraft carried: 1 × Westland Wasp helicopter
- Aviation facilities: A hangar for light helicopter

Service record
- Operations: Falklands War

HMS Hydra (pennant number A144) was a Royal Navy deep ocean hydrographic survey vessel, the third of the original three of the Hecla class. The ship was laid down as yard number 2258 on 14 May 1964 at Yarrow Shipbuilders, at Scotstoun on the River Clyde and launched on 14 July 1965 by Mary Lythall, wife of the then Chief Scientist (Royal Navy), Basil W Lythall CB (1919–2001). She was completed and first commissioned on 4 May 1966 and, as the replacement for the survey ship HMS Owen, her commanding officer and many of her ship's company formed the first commission of HMS Hydra. She was decommissioned and sold to the Indonesian Navy in 1986 and renamed KRI Dewa Kembar (Pennant Number 932); she was still in service in 2019.

== Ship's name and battle honours ==
There have been eight ships of the name HMS Hydra in the Royal Navy, named for the Hydra of Greek Mythology, a serpent with many heads (though nine is generally accepted as standard), the centre one of which was immortal. The monster was overcome and slain by Hercules. The ship's badge of HMS Hydra depicts the monster with seven heads. The ship's motto was Ut Herculis Perseverantia ("Like Hercules Persevere").

== Late 1960s ==
In the month after first commissioning Hydra carried out machinery and equipment trials and embarked stores at Chatham, before sailing for surveys in the North Atlantic. Based in Reykjavík, an extensive area south of Iceland was surveyed between June and September 1966. She then visited Copenhagen and for the remainder of 1966, was employed in searching for wrecks in the shipping lanes of the North Sea and the approaches to the Dover Strait, before returning to Chatham in early December for her winter lie-up. March 1967 saw the ship carrying out a short survey of the critical depths at the entrance of the Black Deep Channel in the Thames estuary. She then carried out a major survey of the bathymetry, gravity anomalies and total magnetic field in a large area of the Atlantic Ocean, covering the North-West Approaches to Britain. At the same time, between May and August 1967, a detached party and the ship's two surveying motor boats undertook a survey of the fishing port of Burtonport, Donegal. After summer leave and maintenance and a visit to Brest, she spent a fortnight on oceanographic surveys in the Azores area, followed by a visit to Lisbon and passage to Freetown. An oceanographic survey of the fishing grounds between Freetown and Agadir was completed. At Gibraltar in mid-November, she conducted trials of towed and free balloons carrying meteorological instruments before reaching Chatham for refit on 24 November 1967.

She recommissioned on 30 January 1968 and in March undertook an oceanographic voyage designed to advance knowledge of air/sea interaction. She carried out surveys in the Bristol Channel in April and then, for six weeks, in the southern approaches to the River Clyde. For the following two months, she was based at Londonderry and an area in the north-western approaches to Ireland was surveyed to the 100-fathom (600 ft; 180 m) line. At Chatham in late August, she took part in Navy Days and then visited the Pool of London in early September. The ship sailed Chatham in late October and carried out surveys off the west coast of Africa, spending Christmas 1968 in Gibraltar.

In early January 1969 she carried out surveys off the French Mediterranean coast. She then took part in the Atlantic Trade Wind Experiment, with survey ships from West Germany and the US; this consisted of a 15-day drift, with engines stopped, from a position some 600 miles (970 km) west of Cape Verde Islands. Hydra returned to Sierra Leone in mid-February and carried out surveys until she sailed Freetown on 25 May 1969. She spent a fortnight investigating an up-welling off Cape Blanc, then calling at Gibraltar before arriving on 19 June 1969 for a refit at Chatham. A new ship's company joined at the end of August and she sailed from Chatham at the end of October for the Far East. Calls were made en route at Freetown, Simonstown and Mauritius and Singapore was reached in time for Christmas. A survey of the Malacca Strait was started on 31 December 1969.

== 1970s - and five years away from the UK ==
Surveying a route 10 miles (16 km) wide down the 180-mile (290 km) length of the Malacca Strait was a mammoth task. Breaks for maintenance, fuel and recreation were taken at Singapore, with a longer interruption from mid-June to mid-October 1970 for refit by Sembawang Shipyard. The ship visited Port Swettenham before resuming surveys in the Malacca Strait. However, she was detached after a fortnight to support the British task force sent from Singapore to relieve the area of East Pakistan stricken by a severe cyclone and storm surge. The ship was used in a survey role, finding and marking channels for small craft to take in food and supplies. She later resumed the Malacca Strait survey and spent Christmas 1970 at Singapore. During her year in the Malacca Strait, 63 shoal soundings were reported and promulgated by Notice to Mariners.

The surveys of the Malacca Strait were concluded in March 1971 and she then spent three weeks in Hong Kong charting waters to the south of Lantao. On 6 April 1971, HMS Hydra sailed from Hong Kong to return to the UK, via the Panama Canal. She called at Yokosuka, Long Beach, Acapulco and Bridgetown, Barbados, making gravity, magnetics and bathymetric observations on passage and investigating several shoals. The summer and autumn of 1971 were spent at Chatham, with a refit and trials.

Recommissioned at Chatham on 11 October 1971, she sailed on 30 November 1971 via the Cape of Good Hope, to return to the Far East from where she was not to return for five years, carrying out extensive surveys in the south Pacific. She left Simonstown on 3 January 1972 and called at Mauritius before carrying out a short investigation around the Aldabra Islands. After a visit to Mombasa to calibrate the ship's gravimeter, the first half of February was spent in the Seychelles where the ship's helicopter helped with the erection of Hi-Fix sites.

Hydra was detached from surveying, and ordered to return to the Mauritius area, arriving off Rodrigues Island, one of the Mascarene Islands, on 26 February to assist in disaster relief. She left the area and arrived Singapore on 13 March, thus completing a circumnavigation of the globe in one year. After a short period of maintenance, she set sail for her 1972 survey area in the Solomon Islands. This survey, from 17 April to 18 August, covered the Bougainville Strait, last surveyed in 1884. Visits were paid to Honiara (Guadalcanal Island), Ghizo Island and Kieta (Bougainville Island). A three-week visit to Brisbane was brought forward in order to have two defective main engines replaced by two flown out from the United Kingdom. The ship arrived in Hong Kong at the end of August, where she spent three months, some time being spent on surveys in local waters. She sailed from Hong Kong on 28 October and arrived in Singapore for her annual refit which began on 13 November; the most important work was the installation of the SRN9 satellite navigation system.

The refit was completed on 13 January and Hydra sailed 12 February 1973 to resume surveys in the Solomon Islands, brief visits being paid to Jakarta and Thursday Island during the 4,000-mile (6,400 km) passage to Honiara. Surveys of Bougainville Strait and New Georgia Sound were completed. A three-week visit was paid to Brisbane in May, for maintenance, and while on passage both ways a reconnaissance was made of Indispensable Reef. For the next thirteen weeks, almost without a break, surveys were undertaken along the north coasts of Choiseul and Santa Isabel Islands and of Manning Strait. A Solomon Islands 45c postage stamp was issued in January 1981, recording the ship's surveying from April 1972 to September 1973.

Preparations for future surveys were carried out around Fiji in late 1973 and a visit was made to Sydney on passage back to Singapore, where she arrived on 26 October for refit; the ship's company lived ashore in the ANZUK barracks. No time was lost owing to bad weather or breakdown during a year in which the ship had steamed over 48,000 miles (77,000 km). The two survey boats had steamed an additional 10,000 miles (16,000 km) during the surveys of the Solomon Islands.

With the refit completed in January 1974, her next surveys were around the Maldives, during which time she visited Gan. She made the long passage east, via Singapore, and arrived at her new base of Suva, in the Fiji Islands, on 12 April. Surveys were carried out off northern Viti Levu, with a break in June/July for maintenance in Brisbane. Back off Viti Levu in July, these surveys were completed by August. The next month, work began on modern surveys off northern Vanua Levu and of Yandua Island. Before departing Fijian waters on 21 October, HMS Hydra took part in celebrations to mark the centenary of the cession of the islands to Queen Victoria, with Prince Charles embarked for part of the time. Survey was made of Epi Island, and other areas, of the New Hebrides on passage for Auckland, New Zealand, where the ship arrived on 28 November for maintenance and leave.

Surveys off Vanua Levu were resumed in January 1975, though work was punctuated with excursions to the Koro Sea for hurricane assistance and search and rescue work. The ship was absent from surveys in the Fiji area in March for a series of vigia investigations in the south-western Pacific. Surveys were broken off at the end of April and, on 2 May, the ship sailed Suva for Singapore, where she arrived on 22 May for a ten-week refit.

HMS Hydra then sailed for the Indian Ocean and was surveying the waters around the Seychelles from September to November. She then had a maintenance period in Mombasa, returning to survey off Mahé. Christmas 1975 was spent in Port Victoria and the ship sailed the Seychelles on 29 December for the Persian Gulf.

The main survey was on the traffic separation routes about 60 miles (97 km) from the eastern end of the Persian Gulf, around the Tunb Islands off Iran. The surveys began with a visit to Bandar Abbas and Iranian naval personnel were attached to the ship for the duration. The ship remained in the area until the end of April, working mostly out of Bandar Abbas, but visits were paid to Karachi (for maintenance), Masirah and Dubai. Passage through the Suez Canal into the Mediterranean was followed by a two-week maintenance period in Malta in late May 1976. Surveys then began in the western Mediterranean, until the middle of September, with visits to Palermo, Malta and Gibraltar. She sailed the Rock on 14 September for Portsmouth, her first sighting of the UK in five years. She then underwent a refit at Vosper Thornycroft in Southampton, when her living accommodation was extensively modernised; boat surveys of Portsmouth harbour, and other south coast harbours, were carried out during the refit. No chart of Chichester harbour had previously existed, and parts of the Poole area had not been surveyed since 1878.

HMS Hydra completed refit in August 1977 and was operational again on 26 September. She sailed 24 October for Iran, calling briefly at Gibraltar and Malta. She arrived at Bandar Abbas, in company with HMS Hecate, on 23 November and surveys then began along the Iranian coast in the Gulf of Oman. Christmas 1977 was spent in Bahrain. She was employed on surveys in the Persian Gulf, off Iran, for much of 1978 and 1979.

On 1 January 1979, as one of four Royal Navy survey ships forming the Persian Gulf Surveying Squadron (Hydra, HMS Herald, HMS Fawn and HMS Fox), HMS Hydra was at anchor in Char Bahar bay on the south-east coast of Iran. Later in the month, the ship was at Bombay for maintenance, resuming surveys off Iran on 4 February. The surveys were almost complete when the ship was ordered to Bandar Abbas assist with the evacuation of western nationals during the Iranian revolution. While awaiting a decision as to their future employment, the ships of the squadron were engaged in investigations of the many shoals in the centre of the Persian Gulf. The ship visited Muscat and then the decision was made to withdraw the squadron, so passage was set for the UK, with visits to Haifa, Catania and Gibraltar, before arriving in Portsmouth on 19 April. She sailed on 9 May for shoal investigations in Scottish waters and spent July and August in Southampton for docking and repairs at Vosper. The autumn of 1979 was spent off the west coast of Scotland, starting a detailed survey of the Western Approaches to the North Channel, an area where a large number of U-boats were sunk in 1946 after their surrender.

== Three years in the life of a Royal Navy survey ship 1980–1983 ==
=== Service 1980–1981 ===
HMS Hydra was employed on surveys off the west coast of Scotland in 1980 and 1981.

=== To West Africa and surveys in the Caribbean 1981–1982 ===
Newly fitted with a leased Sercel Syledis positioning system for evaluation, she sailed on 7 September 1981 to conduct surveys in the Caribbean Sea, surveying the Josephine Bank and the Ampere Bank on 11 and 13 September, as well as investigating "vigia 4", "vigia 7" and "vigia 23". With a maximum speed of 14 knots (26 km/h; 16 mph) using all three engines, when the starboard engine was lost on 21 September, the ship was limited to 11 knots (20 km/h; 13 mph) for the rest of the deployment.

She arrived Dakar, Senegal for a visit from 24 to 28 September 1981. On leaving Dakar, the ship was directed to Banjul, on 29 September in order to locate a ditched Senegalese Puma helicopter, which had crashed into the river while landing Senegalese troops during the attempted coup d'état on 1 August 1981, in the Gambia. Using copies of a recent survey, by sister ship HMS Hecla flown to Dakar from the United Kingdom Hydrographic Office, in Taunton, HMS Hydra's two surveying motor boats began sounding and sonar sweeping and located the ditched machine, the local port authority marking the helicopter's position with a float. She sailed the next day.

She arrived in Lagos, Nigeria, on 5 October 1981, in company with the destroyer USS Conyngham), which she had met, by chance, in fog outside the entrance to the port. She sailed from Lagos on 9 October passing north of St Peter and St Paul Rocks on 16 October, arriving at Bridgetown, Barbados, for a visit from 23 to 27 October. During the trip across the Atlantic the side-scan sonar was deployed the autopilot and engine speed set in an attempt to set a record for the longest survey line. The journey parallel to the equator was carried out with just one small course correction to avoid a fleet of fishing boats near to the coast of South America.

She was alongside at the US Naval Station at Roosevelt Roads, Puerto Rico (known to sailors as Roosey Roads from 29 to 31 October before setting up camps and sites on Great Inagua and the Turks Islands, in order to carry out hydrographic surveys centred on the waters around the British Virgin Islands. These surveys were part of a project in co-operation with the United States Navy, in the Turks and Caicos Islands, covering the Mouchoir Passage and Turks Island Passage. These passages were last surveyed by Commander Richard Owen in HMS Blossom in 1829.

Visits were made to Roadtown, Tortola) from 12 to 16 November and, after sailing, a rendezvous was made with RFA Stromness near Vieques to take on stores, before resuming surveys. On 2 December, she broke off from surveys to visit Nassau, Bahamas from 4–8 December 1981 and then continued surveying (Hydrographic Instruction - HI 54) until 15 December. Changes were found in the configuration of the reefs - the northern edge of the Mouchoir Bank being nearly two miles south of its charted position.

Leaving a handful of volunteers to guard the various sites on island shores, she sailed north in order to spend two weeks alongside in St. Petersburg, Florida, arriving 18 December, for Christmas and New Year 1981/1982. Sailing on 2 January 1982, she arrived on the survey ground four days later and recovered the landed sailors, after their lonely three weeks in the sun.

Hydrographic Instruction "HI 54" was completed by 15 January 1982 and equipment ashore recovered. At anchor overnight on 15/16 January, she sailed for Roosevelt Roads arriving 18 January. She sailed three days later for Sand Cay in order to set up the surveys in the British Virgin Islands (BVI) area; time off task was necessitated by the ship being ordered to co-ordinate a search and rescue operation for a woman lost overboard from a yacht; the search was called off at sunset without finding her. 21–22 January was spent in Road Town, Tortola and then hydrographic surveys began, anchoring overnight 22/23 January off Beef Island, before setting up the boat camp and trisponder station on Guana Island and "bottoming" overnight. Hydrographic surveys continued in the BVI, including a detached boat camp in West Anegada, until completion on 8 February, anchoring that night in Cane Garden Bay, Tortola.

A visit was made to St. John's, on the island of Antigua, from 9–13 February, before passage east across the Atlantic Ocean. 21–22 February was spent surveying the Atlantic Seamount, 400 miles (640 km) southwest of the Azores, completing with a visit to Ponta Delgada, the island's capital, on 25–26 February. At anchor off Swanage, and later in Spithead on 3 March, she returned to Portsmouth Naval Base on 4 March 1982.

=== Hospital ship: The Falklands War of 1982 ===
March was spent in the naval base, the ship undergoing assisted maintenance and the ship's company taking leave. The ship's programme for more surveys off the west coast of Scotland in the summer of 1982 was changed by Argentina's invasion of the Falkland Islands in April 1982. HMS Hydra was converted in Portsmouth Naval Base for service as a hospital ship – a replenishment at sea position was fitted, the yellow funnel painted white and red crosses painted prominently, and the starboard engine replaced – and she sailed on 24 April 1982, in company with her sister-ship HMS Herald, with additional medical staff, for the South Atlantic. A BBC News report on that day described the ship as "... converted to a casualty ferry ... [whose] job will be to ferry wounded troops from the Falklands' beachhead to the hospital ship Uganda; at this stage it was not at all certain quite how the ship would be used.

Her journey south took four weeks, crossing the line on 6 May (although the traditional ceremony was held the previous day, for operational reasons). She was a short time in the anchorage off Ascension Island for replenishment on 8 May. She was at position 35°S 35°W on 15 May and 45°S 47°W on 18 May. HMS Hydra joined sister ship HMS Hecla and SS Uganda, in the "Red Cross Box" (48°30′S 53°45′W), about 45 miles (72 km) north of Falkland Sound on 19 May.

A rendezvous was made on 25 May 1982 with the requisitioned P&O liner, the troopship SS Canberra, and MV Norland in order to transfer casualties by the ship's Westland Wasp helicopter. The day after she arrived in "Red Cross Box 2" – at position 50°50′S 58°40′W on 30 May, she embarked 49 casualties from Uganda. Underway the next day, 2 June 1982, on passage for Montevideo, she undertook the ship's first-ever replenishment at sea – an RAS(L) – with the oiler RFA Olmeda, in order to take on fuel. The ship arrived in the River Plate on 6 June, disembarking her patients in the full glare of the world's media, eager for news and photographs. She sailed south at 2200 the same day.

The pattern of casualty evacuation was thus established: HMS Hydra worked with her two sister ships, HMS Hecla and HMS Herald, to take casualties from the main hospital ship Uganda, operating in the declared "Red Cross Box", to Montevideo, Uruguay, where they were disembarked by a fleet of Uruguayan ambulances and flown by RAF VC10 aircraft to the UK for transfer to the Princess Alexandra Hospital at RAF Wroughton, near Swindon. The hospital ship HMS Hydra made four such passages from the waters off the Falkland Islands to Montevideo, carrying a total of 251 British military casualties, many of them burns victims after the air attacks on landing ships at Bluff Cove. The last three 'lifts' of patients were made with departures from Grantham Sound, in the Falkland Islands, to Montevideo on 14 June with 80 wounded patients, 24 June with 66 patients and, finally, on 7 July 1982 with 48 patients for medical treatment. Thirty of the ship's company had been trained, during the passage south, to support the medical staff as temporary nurses and many were called on for that assistance. Inspections to ensure compliance with International Committee of the Red Cross (ICRC) conditions were carried out by ICRC staff, some transferring to the ship in an Argentine hospital ship aircraft on 12 June. An inspection was also made by Argentine naval officers in the estuary of the River Plate.

After the surrender, to Royal Marines Major-General Jeremy Moore, of the Argentine occupying forces on 14 June 1982, HMS Hydra stayed behind as the Falkland Islands Hospital Ship, based in Stanley (see), until the airport runway was repaired and extended. After her last journey to Uruguay, she returned south and went to anchor in Port William, Falkland Islands, on 17 July. The next day she weighed anchor and sailed into Stanley, to anchor near the damaged RFA Sir Tristram, spending a week in the harbour, undergoing self-maintenance.

She later visited most of the major settlements, providing transport for a civilian doctor to visit the scattered population, and was at Fox Bay from 15 to 17 August. She finally left Stanley on 27 August 1982, calling at Ascension Island on 9 September 1982, disembarking an advance leave party to fly home ahead of the ship.

HMS Hydra was the last unit of the original Operation Corporate Task Force to return to the UK, arriving to an extraordinary welcome in Portsmouth on 24 September 1982; the Hydrographer of the Navy, Rear-Admiral David Haslam, embarked for the passage from Spithead, his flag flying from the ship's HiFix mast so as not to displace the Red Cross flag from the mainmast; also notable was the salute paid to HMS Hydra by the NATO Commander, COMSTRIKFLTLANT, Vice-Admiral James A Lyons Jr of the United States Navy, and the ship's company of his flagship, USS Mount Whitney, lining the deck. The American ship was on a routine visit to Portsmouth; his flagship saluting the junior ship in a signal tribute to her war service, rather than HMS Hydra saluting his senior flag as would be the normal maritime custom (both salutes being made using a Boatswain's call).

HMS Hydra was then converted back to her survey fleet role and resumed surveys in UK waters later in the year. Meanwhile, the ship's company went on leave, many having been away from home waters for eleven of the past twelve months.

=== United Kingdom waters 1982–1983 ===
HMS Hydra, freshly painted in her survey livery and with a large number of new faces among her 120 men, sailed Portsmouth on 25 November 1982 for surveys in the Western Approaches. At first it was too rough to start surveying, so the ship anchored off Scalasaig, Colonsay, on 28 November and weighed anchor to resume surveying the next day; after calibration of the Hyperfix chain being used for positional control, the sonar sweep and sounding began.

She broke off surveying and set passage to Greenock on 5 December, arriving alongside Greenock Pier the next day. She sailed out of the River Clyde on 8 December, and was east of Jura the following day, having resumed surveys. She broke off surveying on 13 December and sailed south for Portsmouth, securing outboard of the Tribal-class frigate HMS Zulu on 16 December 1982, before granting Christmas leave to the majority of the ship's company. Despite the interruptions due to bad weather, 250 square miles (650 km^{2}) of surveying were completed in the three weeks on task.

She sailed Portsmouth five days into the New Year and arrived on the survey ground, off the west coast of Scotland, on 7 January 1983, but surveying proved difficult owing to rough weather; the survey area was about 30 miles (48 km) north of the aptly named Bloody Foreland in the northwest of Ireland. She was off Jura on 8 January and made passage through the Sound of Islay on 10 January. She broke off surveying on 13 January and set passage to the River Clyde, arriving alongside Greenock Pier a day later, sailing again for the survey ground on 17 January.

She passed round the Mull of Kintyre to the Sound of Jura on 18 January and resumed surveys the next day. Very rough weather forced the ship to shelter behind the island of Inishtrahull on 20 January, so little progress had been made before she broke off from surveys and sailed for Belgium on 26 January. She was on passage through the Irish Sea the next day and arrived alongside in Antwerp on 31 January for a four-day visit. She arrived back in Portsmouth, her home port, on 5 February 1983 for a scheduled docking and repairs to defects. She moved into dry dock, and was docked down from 15 to 23 February, the dock being flooded up on 24 February.

HMS Hydra returned to sea on Monday 25 April 1983, for a brief trials and shakedown cruise prior to a week's Safety Operational Sea Training (SOST) at the Portland Naval Base, from 17 to 25 May. On completion of SOST, specialist equipment and trials personnel were embarked from the Admiralty Underwater Weapons Establishment (AUWE), Portland, for a two-month oceanographic trials cruise, in the Rockall Trench area and off Bear Island (Norway). The prototype Depth Analysis System developed at the Admiralty Compass Observatory was installed on the bridge, and trials staff embarked to conduct a short trial while on passage to Scotland. Visits were made to Trondheim and Lorient before the ship returned to her new base port of Devonport at the end of July 1983.

In early September 1983, HMS Hydra returned to Scottish waters and began surveys to the west of the Outer Hebrides for a proposed deep draught shipping route. The ship returned to Devonport on 21 October to prepare for a deployment to the Indian Ocean.

== Final years - 1984–1986 ==
HMS Hydra sailed on 14 November 1983 via Gibraltar, Naples and the Suez Canal for her first survey off the north coast of Oman. Christmas 1983 was spent at Dubai. 300 square miles (780 km^{2}) of surveys were completed before the ship broke off for passage to Mombasa for a period of assisted maintenance. Boat surveys of Mombasa harbour were carried out. Sailing north to the Red Sea, a brief call was made at Hodeida, in the Yemen Arab Republic, before passage north to the Suez Canal and through to the Mediterranean Sea. A visit was made to Haifa and then the ship called at Gibraltar before conducting a short examination of the Chaucer Bank before returning to Devonport in mid-April 1984. The remainder of 1984 was spent surveying between St Kilda and Barra, off the west coast of Scotland, with a short period on oceanographic work in northern waters. A detached party carried out a boat survey of Loch Melfort.

She spent the early part of 1985 continuing a survey of the Sea of the Hebrides. On 10 September 1985 she sailed from Devonport to continue surveys in Kenyan waters, which she had started in 1984, and this work continued until January 1986. In mid-January she was ordered to proceed to assist with the evacuation of expatriates from the People's Democratic Republic of Yemen. She assisted HMY Britannia with the evacuation of 49 civilians before being released for the homeward passage to the United Kingdom. She arrived in Devonport on 27 February 1986 wearing her paying-off pennant. She was decommissioned and put on the disposal list on 31 March 1986.

== Honours ==
HMS Hydra added a seventh Battle Honour – South Atlantic 1982 – to her name. From September 1981, her ship's company of 120 changed little for a year, notably the addition of wartime medical staff in April 1982. All the ship's company involved in Operation Corporate in 1982 were awarded the South Atlantic Medal, with rosette, engraved with their rank, name and ship's name.
