= NEC HYDRAstor =

- Stable release: HS8-5000 / 2016
- Written in: C++
- Platform: Cross-platform
- Type: Backup and Archive
- License: proprietary
- Website: www.necam.com/hydrastor/

NEC HYDRAstor is a disk-based grid storage system with data deduplication for backups and archiving, developed by NEC Corporation. A HYDRAstor storage system can be composed of multiple nodes, starting from one up to 100+ nodes. Each node contains standard hardware including disk drives, CPU, memory and network interfaces and is integrated with the HYDRAstor software into a single storage pool. HYDRAstor software incorporates multiple features of distributed storage systems: content-addressable storage, global data deduplication, variable block size, Rabin fingerprinting, erasure codes, data encryption and load balancing.

== History ==
HYDRAstor project was started in 2002 by Cezary Dubnicki and Cristian Ungureanu in NEC Research in Princeton, NJ. Prototype version was implemented and evaluated in 2004. After another 3 years of development, first version of HYDRAstor was brought to the market in US and Japan. In January 2008 Cezary Dubnicki founded 9Livesdata LLC which developed HYDRAstor backend features in cooperation with NEC. Subsequent version with improved software and hardware were released in following years, with latest version, HS8-5000, providing 72TB raw storage per node, up to 11.88PB of raw capacity in its maximum configuration.

== Main features ==
HYDRAstor can be scaled from single node to 165 nodes in a multi-rack grid appliance. Capacity and bandwidth can be scaled independently by using different types of nodes:

- HYDRAstor nodes:
  - storage nodes – adding capacity
  - hybrid nodes – adding both capacity and performance
- high9stor h9s-1 nodes – compatible with NEC HydraStor storage nodes

HYDRAstor supports online expansion, with automatic data migration and with no downtime. In standard configuration, HYDRAstor provides resiliency to up to 3 concurrent disk or node failures. Failures are automatically detected and data reconstruction is automatically performed, which means that if time between failures is enough to reconstruct data, system can withstand any number of them.
