= Hydra-class sloop =

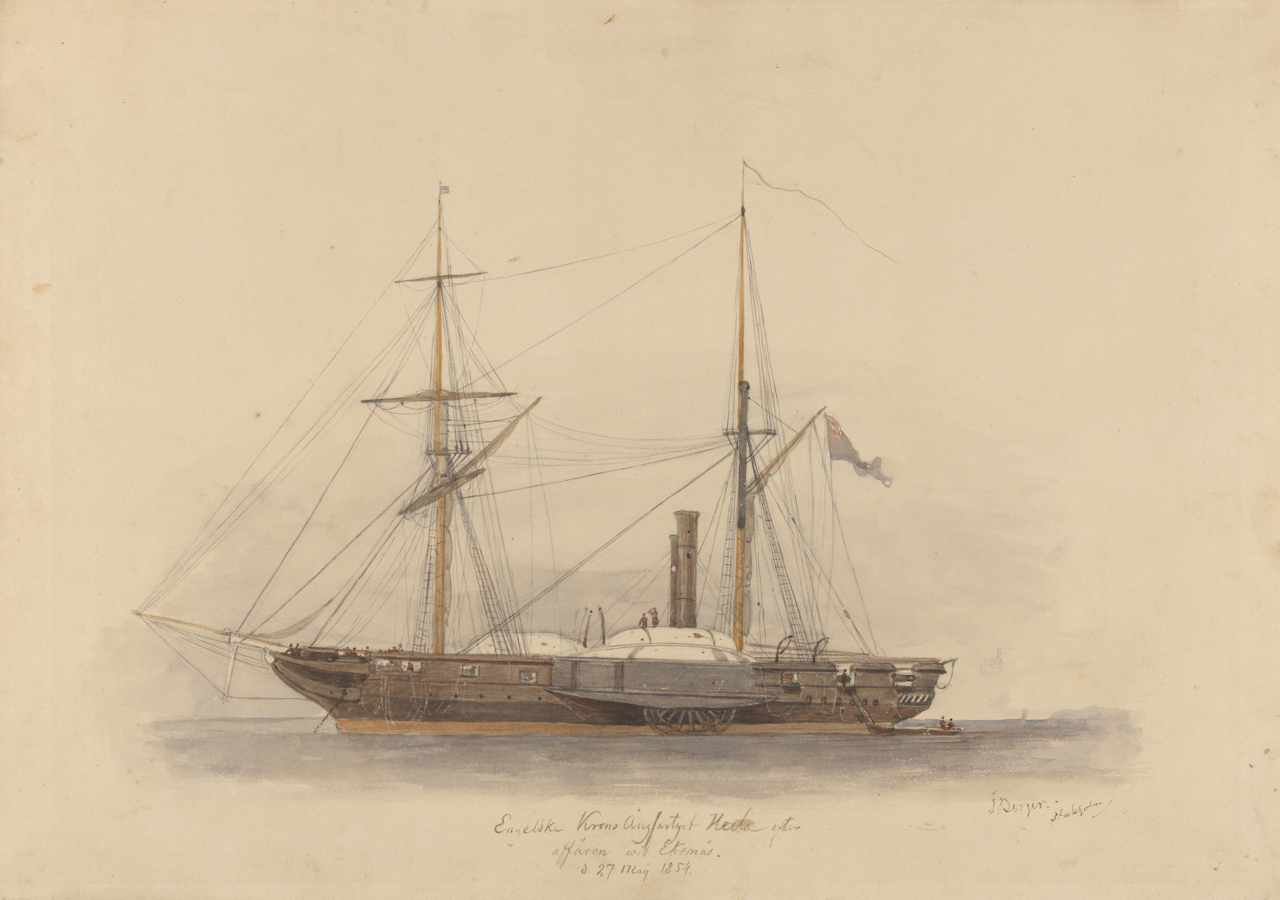
- Hecla in 1854

Class overview
- Name: Hydra-class steam sloop
- Builders: Chatham Dockyard
- Operators: Royal Navy
- Preceded by: HMS Gorgon
- Succeeded by: Merlin-class sloop
- Cost: £37,239 (Note: A total cost accounting for inflation of approximately £4,235,200 in today's money.)
- Built: 1837–1839
- In commission: 1838–1870
- Completed: 3
- Retired: 3

General characteristics
- Type: Second-class steam vessel; (later second class sloop)
- Displacement: 1,096 long tons (1,114 t)
- Tons burthen: 814 91/94 tons bm
- Length: 165 ft 0 in (50.3 m) (gundeck); 143 ft 7 1/4 in (43.8 m) (keel)
- Beam: 32 ft 10 in (10.0 m)
- Draught: 12 ft 1 in (3.7 m) (forward); 13 ft 0 in (4.0 m) (aft)
- Depth of hold: 20 ft 4 in (6.2 m)
- Installed power: Hydra: 220 nhp; Hecla & Hecate: 240 nhp
- Propulsion: Hydra: Boulton and Watt side-lever steam engine; Iron tubular boilers; Side paddles; Hecla & Hecate: Sinclair & Scott side-lever steam engine; Iron tubular boilers; Side paddles
- Sail plan: Brig rig
- Speed: 9 knots (17 km/h) (under steam)
- Complement: 135
- Armament: 2 × 32-pounder (50 cwt) guns; 2 × 8-inch (204 mm) 65 cwt pivot guns

The Hydra class were a class of three paddlewheel steam sloops of the British Royal Navy. They saw active service variously in the Baltic during the Crimean War, against Ottoman forces in Syria and against slavers in West Africa. Latterly, Hydra and Hecate were used for surveys in the Mediterranean, the Pacific, Australia and the Atlantic, and thus their names were re-used for the Hecla-class survey vessels in the late 20th century. Two of the classes were broken up after more than twenty-five years of service, and Hecla was sold for commercial use in 1863.

== Design ==
The ships were designed by Sir William Symonds and were approved on 3 November 1837. They were built of wood, displaced 1,096 tons and had a length on the gundeck of 165 feet (50.3 m).

=== Propulsion ===
Power was provided by a two-cylinder side-lever steam engine driving paddle wheels. In Hecla and Hecate this engine was provided by Scott & Sinclair, and was rated at 240 nominal horsepower; in Hydra, the steam engine was provided by Boulton and Watt and rated at 220 nominal horsepower. All the ships were capable of about 9 knots (17 km/h) under steam. Paddle sloops of the period were usually built with a schooner rig, but later pictures show Hecate with a brig rig.

Hecla had her engines replaced in her 1848–1849 refit.

=== Armament ===
All three ships were armed with two 32-pounder (50 cwt) smoothbore muzzle-loading guns on truck mounts and two 8 in (200 mm) (65 cwt) smoothbore muzzle-loading shell guns on pivoting mounts. (Note: "cwt", or "hundredweight" refers to the weight of the gun itself. "32-pounder" refers to the weight of the ball fired.)

=== Crew ===
They had a complement of approximately 135 men.

== Service ==
=== Hecate ===
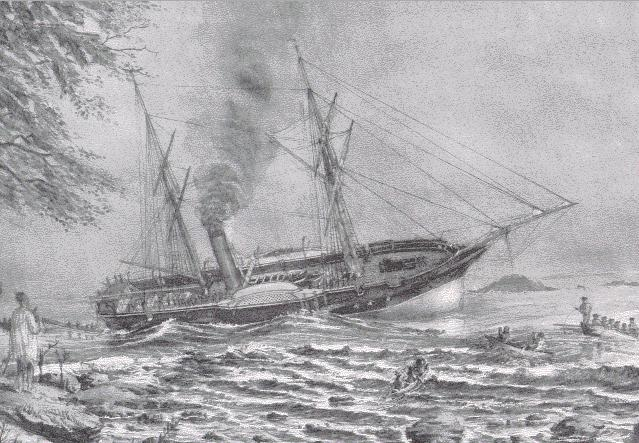
Hecate run aground at Neah Bay east of Cape Flattery in 1861

Hecate served in the Mediterranean from 1840 to 1843, including operations against the Ottomans in Syria in 1840. From 1845 to 1857 she served off the west coast of Africa, including anti-slavery operations. In 1860 she became a survey vessel, and under George Henry Richards she made a survey of Vancouver Island.

=== Hydra ===
With Hecate, Hydra served in the Mediterranean, including the 1840 Syria operations. She served from 1840 to 1862 on both seaboards of the North and South Atlantic, including the period 1858 to 1862, when she was commanded by Richard Vesey Hamilton, later to become First Naval Lord. In 1863 she conducted survey work in the Mediterranean.

=== Hecla ===
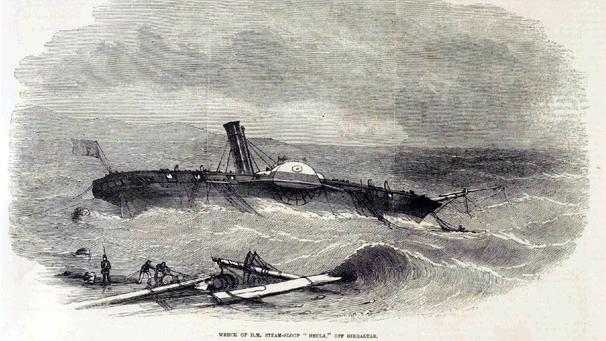
Hecla run aground off Gibraltar in 1855

From her commissioning in 1839 to 1854 Hecla served in the West Indies, in the Mediterranean and on the west coast of Africa. In February 1854 she reconnoitred the Baltic for British operations there during the Crimean War, and from March to November 1854, under the command of Captain William Hutcheon Hall, who had taken command of the small vessel because a warship of the size appropriate to his seniority was not available. She ran aground off Gibraltar on 23 January 1855, for which her commanding officer, Henry Samuel Hawker was severely reprimanded by a court martial. She served off the west coast of Africa until 1859, and was sold to Williams & Co. for £2,550 for commercial use on 15 June 1863 and renamed Typhoon.

== Ships ==
Name	Ship builder	Laid down	Launched	Commissioned	Fate
Hydra	Chatham Dockyard	January 1838	13 June 1838 (Note: Winfield has "July 1838")	11 July 1838	Sold for breaking 13 May 1870
Hecla	Chatham Dockyard	June 1838	14 January 1839	28 August 1839	Sold to Williams & Co. for commercial use on 15 June 1863 and renamed Typhoon
Hecate	Chatham Dockyard	June 1838	30 March 1839	7 December 1839	Sold for breaking in 1865

== See also ==
- Hydra-class ironclad
- Hydra-class minelayer
- Hydra-class frigate
