= RRS Discovery (1962) =

British Royal Research Ship

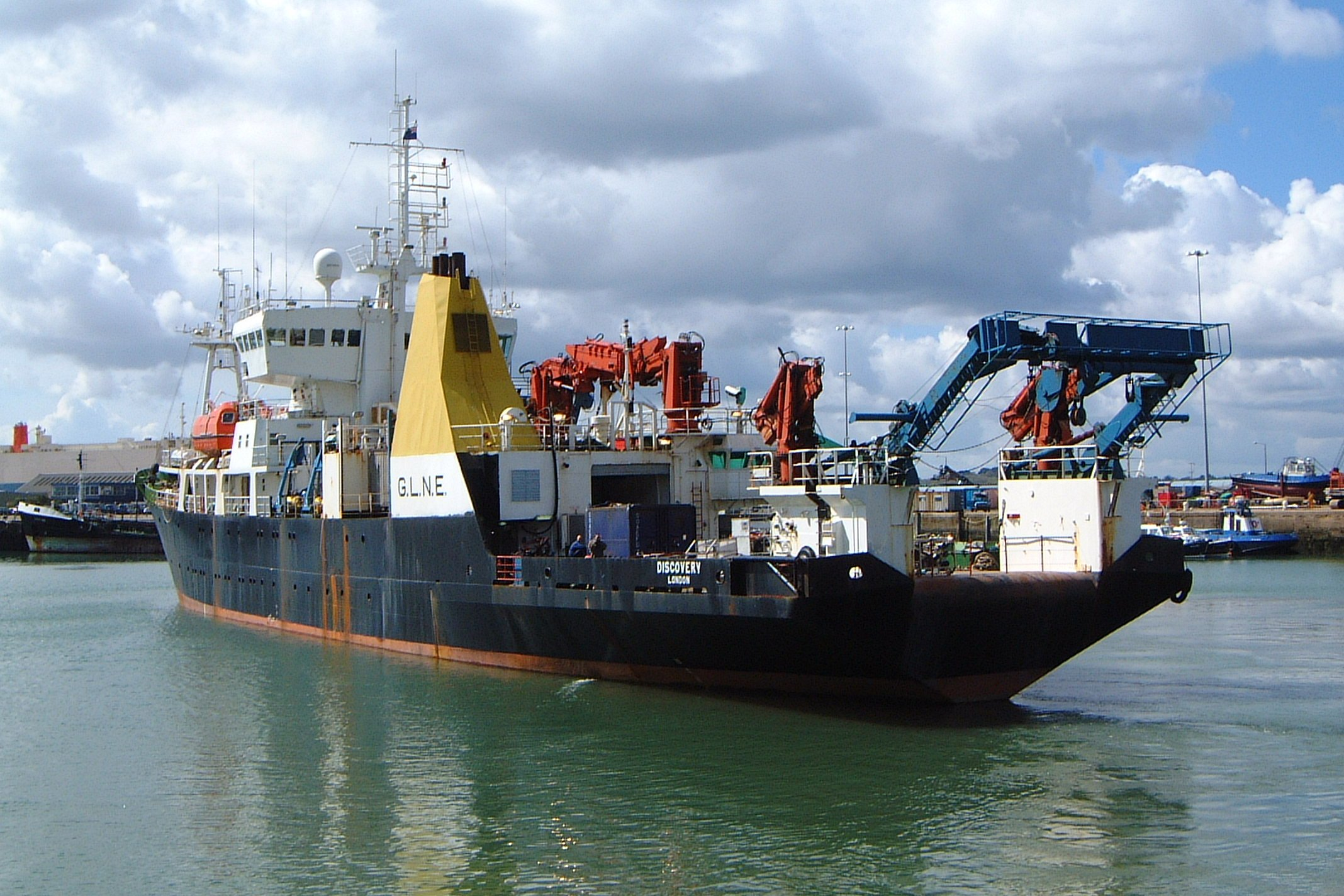
- RRS Discovery

History

United Kingdom
- Name: RRS Discovery
- Owner: NERC National Marine Facilities Division
- Builder: Hall Russell, Aberdeen
- Yard number: 899
- Laid down: 1962
- Launched: 3 July 1962
- Out of service: 14 December 2012
- Identification: IMO number: 5090660; MMSI number: 233882000; Call Sign: GLNE; ICES Code: 74E3
- Fate: Scrapped Ghent 27 February 2013

General characteristics
- Class & type: Royal Research Ship; DTp VII, Lloyds 100A1
- Tonnage: 3,008 GT; 4,378 DWT
- Length: 90.0 m
- Beam: 14.0 m
- Draught: 5.52 m (full load)
- Depth: 7.83 m
- Installed power: 3716 kW
- Propulsion: Diesel-electric system with 2 × Mirrlees Blackstone ESL6 and 2 × Mirrlees Blackstone ELS9 Mk2 Diesel engines driving a propulsion motor. 360° azimuth thruster unit at bow
- Speed: 11.0 knots (max: 12.5 knots)
- Endurance: 55 days
- Crew: 9 Officers; 13 Crew; 28 Scientists

RRS Discovery was a British Royal Research Ship operated by Natural Environment Research Council (NERC).

RRS Discovery (III) was built in Aberdeen in 1962 and named after Robert Falcon Scott's 1901 ship, RRS Discovery. Until 2006, she was the largest general purpose oceanographic research vessel in use in the United Kingdom. Measuring 90 metres in length, and fitted with a broad range of oceanographic equipment, Discovery could also accommodate containerized laboratories. She had berths for 28 scientific staff, and the ability to spend up to 45 days at sea. Her last major overhaul was in 1991, when a new superstructure and power plant were installed and her hull lengthened by 10 metres.

Discovery carried out oceanographic and marine biology research from the National Oceanography Centre, Southampton. She operated as part of a fleet maintained by the NERC, National Marine Facilities Division (NMFD), along with the larger RRS James Cook.

In February 2000, Discovery observed some of the largest waves, called rogue waves, up to 29.1 metres (95.5 feet), recorded by scientific instruments up to that time.

Discovery was scrapped at Ghent on 27 February 2013.
