= List of ship launches in 2002 =

The list of ship launches in 2002 includes a chronological list of all ships launched in 2002.

Date	Ship	Class / type	Builder	Location	Country	Notes
19 January	P&O Nedlloyd Encounter	Santa-R-class container ship	Samsung Heavy Industries	Geoje	South Korea	For Offen Group
25 January	Navigator of the Seas	Voyager-class cruise ship	Kvaerner Masa-Yards	Turku	Finland	For Royal Caribbean International
1 February	Lykes Ranger	Charleston-Express-class container ship	China Shipbuilding Corporation	Kaohsiung	Taiwan	For Lykes Lines
9 February	E.R. India	Samsung 5500-class container ship	Samsung Heavy Industries	Goeje	South Korea	
9 February	Nathalie Ehler	Sietas type 178 container ship	Schiffswerft J.J. Sietas	Hamburg-Neuenfelde	Germany	For Reederei Ehler
25 February	MSC Marianna	Sealand-New-York-type container ship	Ulsan	Hyundai Heavy Industries	South Korea	For Costamare Shipping
28 February	Almirante Juan de Borbón	Álvaro de Bazán-class frigate	Izar	Ferrol	Spain	
28 February	Maersk Kobe	Sealand-New-York-type container ship	Ulsan	Hyundai Heavy Industries	South Korea	For Costamare Shipping
3 March	P&O Nedlloyd Botany	Santa-R-class container ship	Samsung Heavy Industries	Geoje	South Korea	For Offen Group
4 March	Echo	Echo-class survey ship	Appledore Shipbuilders Ltd.	Appledore	United Kingdom	For Royal Navy.
16 March	MSC Barbara	Sealand-New-York-type container ship	Ulsan	Hyundai Heavy Industries	South Korea	For Costamare Shipping
20 March	U-31	Type 212 submarine	HDW	Kiel	Germany	For German Navy
20 March	E.R. Denmark	Samsung 5500-class container ship	Samsung Heavy Industries	Goeje	South Korea	
22 March	Antje-Helen Wulff	Type Stocznia Gdynia 8184-container ship	Stocznia Gdynia	Gdynia	Poland	
5 April	MSC Michaela	Sealand-New-York-type container ship	Ulsan	Hyundai Heavy Industries	South Korea	For Costamare Shipping
12 April	Cornelia Mærsk	Mærsk C-class container ship	Odense Staalskibsvaerft	Lindø	Denmark	For Maersk Line
13 April	De Ruyter	De Zeven Provinciën-class frigate	Koninklijke Schelde Groep	Flushing	Netherlands	
19 April	Hurst Point	Point-class sealift ship	Flensburger Schiffbau-Gesellschaft	Flensburg	Germany	For British Armed Forces
26 April	Soderman	Watson-class vehicle cargo ship	National Steel and Shipbuilding Company	San Diego, California	United States	
27 April	Tyne	River-class patrol vessel	VT Group	Southampton	United Kingdom	For Royal Navy
2 May	Enterprise	Echo-class survey vessel	VT Group: Appledore Shipbuilders	Appledore	United Kingdom	For Royal Navy.
11 May	P&O Nedlloyd Barossa Valley	Type Hyundai 2530 TEU container ship	STX Offshore & Shipbuilding	Jinhae	South Korea	
11 May	MSC Loretta	Sealand-New-York-type container ship	Ulsan	Hyundai Heavy Industries	South Korea	For Costamare Shipping
12 May	P&O Nedlloyd Pegasus	Santa-R-class container ship	Samsung Heavy Industries	Geoje	South Korea	For Offen Group
18 May	Contship Aurora	Dublin Express-class container ship	Daewoo Shipbuilding & Marine Engineering	Geoje	South Korea	For Contship Containerlines
20 May	E.R. Sweden	Samsung 5500-class container ship	Samsung Heavy Industries	Goeje	South Korea	
25 May	Ballarat	Anzac-class frigate	Tenix Defence Systems	Williamstown, Victoria	Australia	
25 May	Guangzhou	Type 052B destroyer	Jiangnan Shipyard	Shanghai	China	
25 May	Wuhan	Type 052B destroyer	Jiangnan Shipyard	Shanghai	China	
25 May	Rickmers Tokyo	Type Superflex Heavy MPC container ship	Xiamen Shipbuilding Industry	Xiamen	China	For Rickmers Group
30 May	Rickmers Singapore	Type Superflex Heavy MPC container ship	Nanjing Jinling Shipyard	Nanjing	China	For Rickmers Group
31 May	Brilliance of the Seas	Radiance-class cruise ship	Meyer Werft	Papenburg	Germany	For Royal Caribbean International
6 June	Amatola	Valour-class frigate	Blohm + Voss	Hamburg, Germany	Germany	For South African Navy
14 June	P&O Nedlloyd Dubai	Type Stocznia Gdynia 8184-container ship	Stocznia Gdynia	Gdynia	Poland	
22 June	Jerambak	Nakhoda-Ragam-class corvette	BAE Systems Marine	Scotstoun	Scotland	For Royal Brunei Navy
24 June	Rickmers Shanghai	Type Superflex Heavy MPC container ship	Shanghai Shipyard & Chengxi Shipyard	Shanghai	China	For Rickmers Group
25 June	TMM Guanajuato	Charleston-Express-class container ship	China Shipbuilding Corporation	Kaohsiung	Taiwan	For Transportacion Maritima Mexicana
26 June	Pinckney	Arleigh Burke-class destroyer	Ingalls Shipbuilding	Pascagoula, Mississippi	United States	
28 June	Columbine Mærsk	Mærsk C-class container ship	Odense Staalskibsvaerft	Lindø	Denmark	For Maersk Line
16 July	Hellespont Tara	TI-class supertanker	Daewoo Shipbuilding & Marine Engineering	Geoje	South Korea	For Hellespont
1 August	Anvil Point	Ferry	Harland & Wolff	Belfast	United Kingdom	For Bank Line.
3 August	P&O Nedlloyd Palliser	Santa-R-class container ship	Samsung Heavy Industries	Geoje	South Korea	For Offen Group
8 August	Makinami	Takanami-class destroyer			Japan	
16 August	Hamburg	Sachsen-class frigate	HDW	Kiel	Germany	
16 August	Eddystone	Point-class sealift ship	Flensburger Schiffbau-Gesellschaft	Flensburg	Germany	For British Armed Forces
20 August	Rickmers Seoul	Type Superflex Heavy MPC container ship	Shanghai Shipyard & Chengxi Shipyard	Shanghai	China	For Rickmers Group
24 August	Hong Kong Express	Hamburg-Express-class container ship	Hyundai Heavy Industries	Ulsan	South Korea	For Hapag Lloyd
6 September	Hartland Point	Ferry	Harland & Wolff	Belfast	United Kingdom	For Bank Line.
7 September	Stena Britannica II	Seamaster-RoPax-ferry	Hyundai Heavy Industries	Ulsan	South Korea	For Stena Line
7 September	Pioneer Ocean	Sietas type 178 container ship	Schiffswerft J.J. Sietas	Hamburg-Neuenfelde	Germany	
14 September	Columbus New Zealand	Santa-R-class container ship	Samsung Heavy Industries	Geoje	South Korea	For Offen Group
16 September	Pride of America	Cruise ship	Ingalls Shipbuilding	Pascagoula, Mississippi	United States	For American Classic Cruises
2 October	Clementine Mærsk	Mærsk C-class container ship	Odense Staalskibsvaerft	Lindø	Denmark	For Maersk Line
17 October	Tian Dan	Cheng Kung-class frigate	China Shipbuilding	Kaohsiung	Taiwan	
17 October	Lykes Flyer	Charleston-Express-class container ship	China Shipbuilding Corporation	Kaohsiung	Taiwan	For Lykes Lines
17 October	TMM Yucatán	Charleston-Express-class container ship	China Shipbuilding Corporation	Kaohsiung	Taiwan	For Transportacion Maritima Mexicana
21 Oktober	P&O Nedlloyd Mairangi	Santa-R-class container ship	Samsung Heavy Industries	Geoje	South Korea	For Offen Group
23 October	Kuroshio	Oyashio-class submarine			Japan	
25 October	Lina	Sietas type 178 container ship	Schiffswerft J.J. Sietas	Hamburg-Neuenfelde	Germany	For Reederei Heinz-Georg Vöge
26 October	Maersk Kolkata	Sealand-New-York-type container ship	Ulsan	Hyundai Heavy Industries	South Korea	For Costamare Shipping
27 October	Norwegian Dawn	Cruise ship	Meyer Werft	Papenburg	Germany	For Norwegian Cruise Line
31 October	Stena Adventurer	Seamaster-RoPax-ferry	Hyundai Heavy Industries	Ulsan	South Korea	For Stena Line
2 November	Chafee	Arleigh Burke-class destroyer	Bath Iron Works	Bath, Maine	United States	
4 November	Rickmers Antwerp	Type Superflex Heavy MPC container ship	Xiamen Shipbuilding Industry	Xiamen	China	For Rickmers Group
8 November	Longstone	Point-class sealift ship	Flensburger Schiffbau-Gesellschaft	Flensburg	Germany	For British Armed Forces
date	Toisa Independent	Offshore supply vessel	Appledore Shipbuilders Ltd.	Appledore	United Kingdom	For Toisa Ltd.
22 November	Pioneer Lake	Sietas type 178 container ship	Schiffswerft J.J. Sietas	Hamburg-Neuenfelde	Germany	
4 December	Severn	River-class patrol vessel	VT Group	Southampton	United Kingdom	For Royal Navy
5 December	Isandlwana	Valour-class frigate	Howaldtswerke-Deutsche Werft	Kiel, Germany	Germany	For South African Navy
15 December	Chung-Hoon	Arleigh Burke-class destroyer	Ingalls Shipbuilding	Pascagoula, Mississippi	United States	
26 December	OOCL Shenzhen	OOCL SX-class container ship	Samsung Heavy Industries	Geoje	South Korea	For Orient Overseas Container Line
Unknown date	Faoilean	Workboat	David Abels Boatbuilders Ltd.	Bristol	United Kingdom	For private owner.
Unknown date	Grigory Lovtsov	Ro-ro coastal cargo ship	Watanabe Zosen K. K.	Japan	Russia	
Unknown date	RPA 12	Fireboat	Stocznia Tczew	Tczew, Poland	Netherlands	For Rotterdam Port Authority
Unknown date	Tempera	Crude oil tanker	Sumitomo Heavy Industries	Yokosuka, Japan	Japan	For Neste Oil; first double acting tanker
