= Andrian =

Andrian may refer to:

- Andrian, South Tyrol, an Italian commune
- Andrian (name)
- -andrian, a botanical suffix
- SS Andrian, a British cargo ship
- The Bacchanal of the Andrians, an oil painting by Titian

== See also ==
- Adrian
- Andriano
- Andriani
- Andrien, a surname
