= Rickmers =

Rickmers may refer to:

== People ==
- Erck Rickmers, a German businessman and politician

== Ships ==
- R. C. Rickmers (1906), a German five-masted steel clipper barque
- Rickmer Rickmers, a museum ship in Hamburg, Germany
- SS Claus Rickmers, a cargo ship which was built in 1923 for Rickmers Reederei AG

== Other uses ==
- Rickmers Group, an international provider of services for the maritime industry
