= List of ship commissionings in 2003 =

The list of ship commissionings in 2003 includes a chronological list of all ships commissioned in 2003.

	Operator	Ship	Flag	Class and type	Pennant	Other notes
26 February	Japan Maritime Self-Defense Force	Kunisaki		Ōsumi-class tank landing ship	LST-4003	
March	Royal Canadian Navy	Corner Brook		Victoria-class submarine	SSK 878	
3 March	Japan Maritime Self-Defense Force	Narushio		Oyashio-class submarine	SS-595	
7 March	Royal Navy	Echo		Echo-class survey ship	H87	First in class
12 March	Japan Maritime Self-Defense Force	Takanami		Takanami-class destroyer	DD-110	First in class
13 March	Japan Maritime Self-Defense Force	Onami		Takanami-class destroyer	DD-111	
14 March	Royal Netherlands Navy	Tromp		De Zeven Provinciën-class frigate	F803	
29 March	Royal Australian Navy	Rankin		Collins-class submarine	SSG 78	
12 April	United States Navy	Mason		Arleigh Burke-class destroyer	DDG-87	
18 June	Indian Navy	Talwar		Talwar-class frigate	F40	First in class
19 June	Royal Navy	Albion		Albion-class landing platform dock	L14	First in class
25 June	Indian Navy	Trishul		Talwar-class frigate	F43	
25 June	Royal Canadian Navy	Windsor		Victoria-class submarine	SSK 877	
July	Royal Navy	Severn		River-class patrol vessel	P282	
July	Royal Navy	Tyne		River-class patrol vessel	P281	
8 July	United States NOAA	Thomas Jefferson		Survey vessel	S 222	
12 July	United States Navy	Ronald Reagan		Nimitz-class aircraft carrier	CVN-76	
26 July	United States Navy	Mustin		Arleigh Burke-class destroyer	DDG-89	
4 September	Chilean Navy	Almirante Williams		Type 22 frigate	FF-19	former HMS Sheffield
4 October	Royal Australian Navy	Parramatta		Anzac-class frigate	FFH 154	
17 October	Royal Navy	Enterprise		Echo-class survey ship	H88	
18 October	United States Navy	Chafee		Arleigh Burke-class destroyer	DDG-90	
December	Royal Navy	Mersey		River-class patrol vessel	P283	
