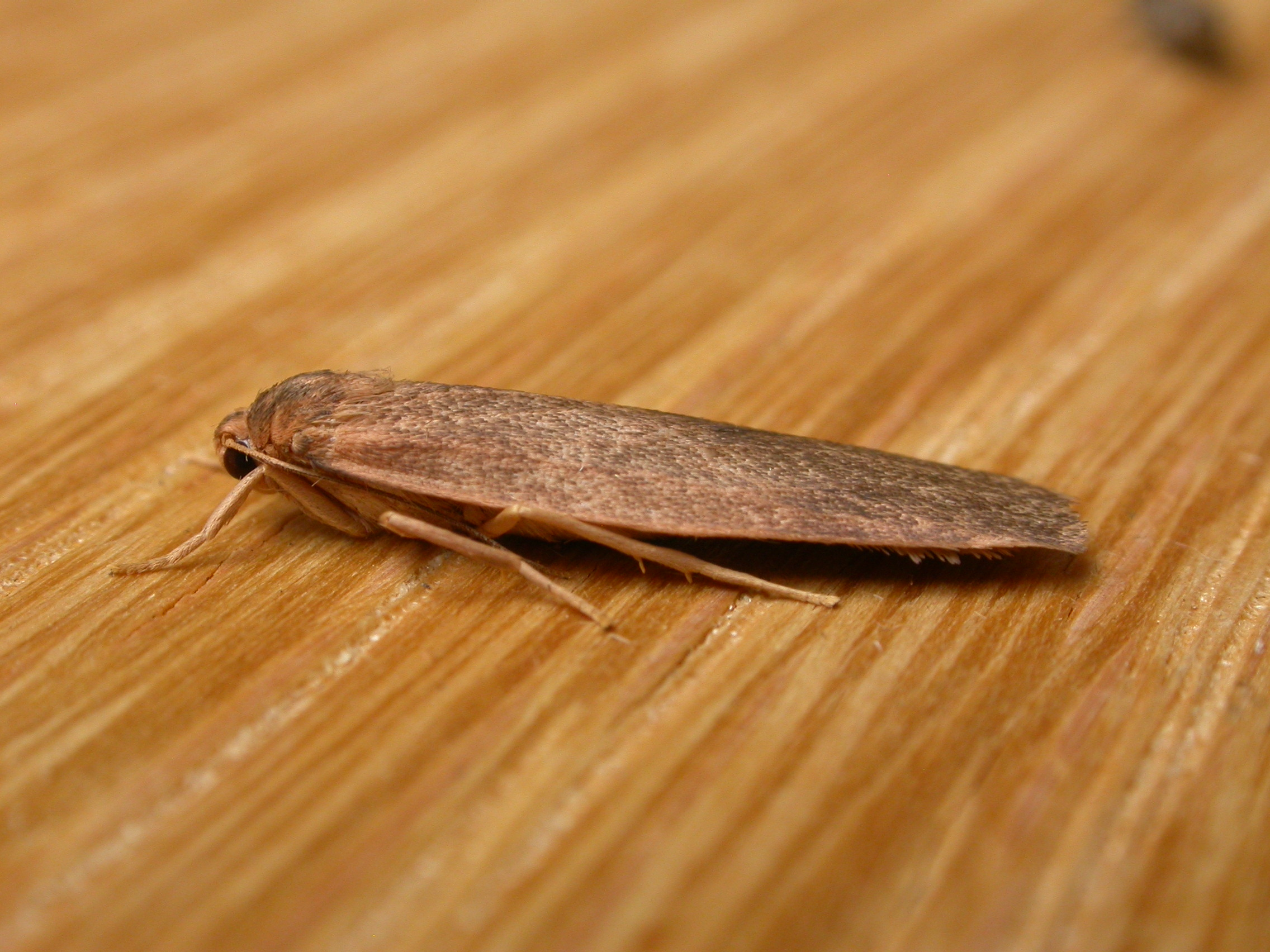

Scientific classification
- Kingdom: Animalia
- Phylum: Arthropoda
- Class: Insecta
- Order: Lepidoptera
- Superfamily: Noctuoidea
- Family: Erebidae
- Subfamily: Arctiinae
- Subtribe: Lithosiina
- Genus: Scoliacma; Meyrick, 1886

= Scoliacma =

Genus of moths

Scoliacma is a genus of tiger moths in the family Erebidae. The genus was erected by Edward Meyrick in 1886.

== Species ==
- Scoliacma adrasta (Turner, 1940)
- Scoliacma adriani De Vos, 2008
- Scoliacma albicostata Hampson, 1918
- Scoliacma albogrisea Rothschild, 1912
- Scoliacma aroa Bethune-Baker, 1904
- Scoliacma bicolora (Boisduval, 1832)
- Scoliacma brunnea H. Druce, 1899
- Scoliacma fasciata (Aurivillius, 1920)
- Scoliacma fuscofascia Rothschild, 1913
- Scoliacma hampsoni Bethune-Baker, 1904
- Scoliacma heringi Gaede, 1925
- Scoliacma laniata (Hampson, 1914)
- Scoliacma ligneofusca Rothschild, 1912
- Scoliacma nana Walker, 1854
- Scoliacma pactolias Meyrick, 1886
- Scoliacma pasteophara Turner, 1940
- Scoliacma suzannae De Vos, 2008
- Scoliacma virginea Bethune-Baker, 1908
- Scoliacma xuthopis Hampson, 1914

== Former species ==
- Scoliacma nephelozona (Meyrick, 1889)
