= Andriano =

Andriano is a surname. Notable people with the surname include:

- Dan Andriano (born 1977), American singer, songwriter, and musician
- Joseph Andriano, American politician

== See also ==
- Andrian (disambiguation)
- Adriano
- Andriani
