= Adriani =

Adriani may refer to:

== People ==
- Camillus Adriani, a Roman Catholic prelate who served as Auxiliary Bishop of Ostia-Velletri;
- Giovanni Battista Adriani (1511/1513–1579), Italian historian;
- Götz Adriani (born 1940), German art historian;
- Isabelle Adriani (born 1972), Italian actress;
- Jerry Adriani (1947–2017), Brazilian singer, musician and actor;
- Nicolaus Adriani (1865–1926), Dutch missionary and linguist.

== Other ==
- Alberto Adriani Municipality, a municipality in Venezuela;
- Scoliacma adriani, a moth found in Papua;
- Spilarctia adriani, a moth found in Papua.

== See also ==
- Andriani
