= Scoliacma pasteophara =

Scientific classification
- Domain: Eukaryota
- Kingdom: Animalia
- Phylum: Arthropoda
- Class: Insecta
- Order: Lepidoptera
- Superfamily: Noctuoidea
- Family: Erebidae
- Subfamily: Arctiinae
- Genus: Scoliacma
- Species: S. pasteophara

Binomial name
- Scoliacma pasteophara Turner, 1940

Species of moth

Scoliacma pasteophara is a moth in the family Erebidae. It was described by Alfred Jefferis Turner in 1940. It is found in Australia, where it has been recorded from Western Australia.
