= Scoliacma brunnea =

Scientific classification
- Domain: Eukaryota
- Kingdom: Animalia
- Phylum: Arthropoda
- Class: Insecta
- Order: Lepidoptera
- Superfamily: Noctuoidea
- Family: Erebidae
- Subfamily: Arctiinae
- Genus: Scoliacma
- Species: S. brunnea

Binomial name
- Scoliacma brunnea H. Druce, 1899

Synonyms
- Ilema hades Bethune-Baker, 1904; Nishada brunnea Rothschild, 1912 (nec Druce, 1899)

Species of moth

Scoliacma brunnea is a moth in the family Erebidae. It was described by Herbert Druce in 1899. It is found in New Guinea. The habitat consists of both lowlands and areas at higher altitudes.
