= Andrien =

Andrien is a surname. Notable people with the surname include:

- Jean-Jacques Andrien (born 1944), Belgian film director
- Martin-Joseph Andrien (1766–1822), French operatic bass

== See also ==
- Adrien
- Andrian (name)
- Andries
- Andraux
