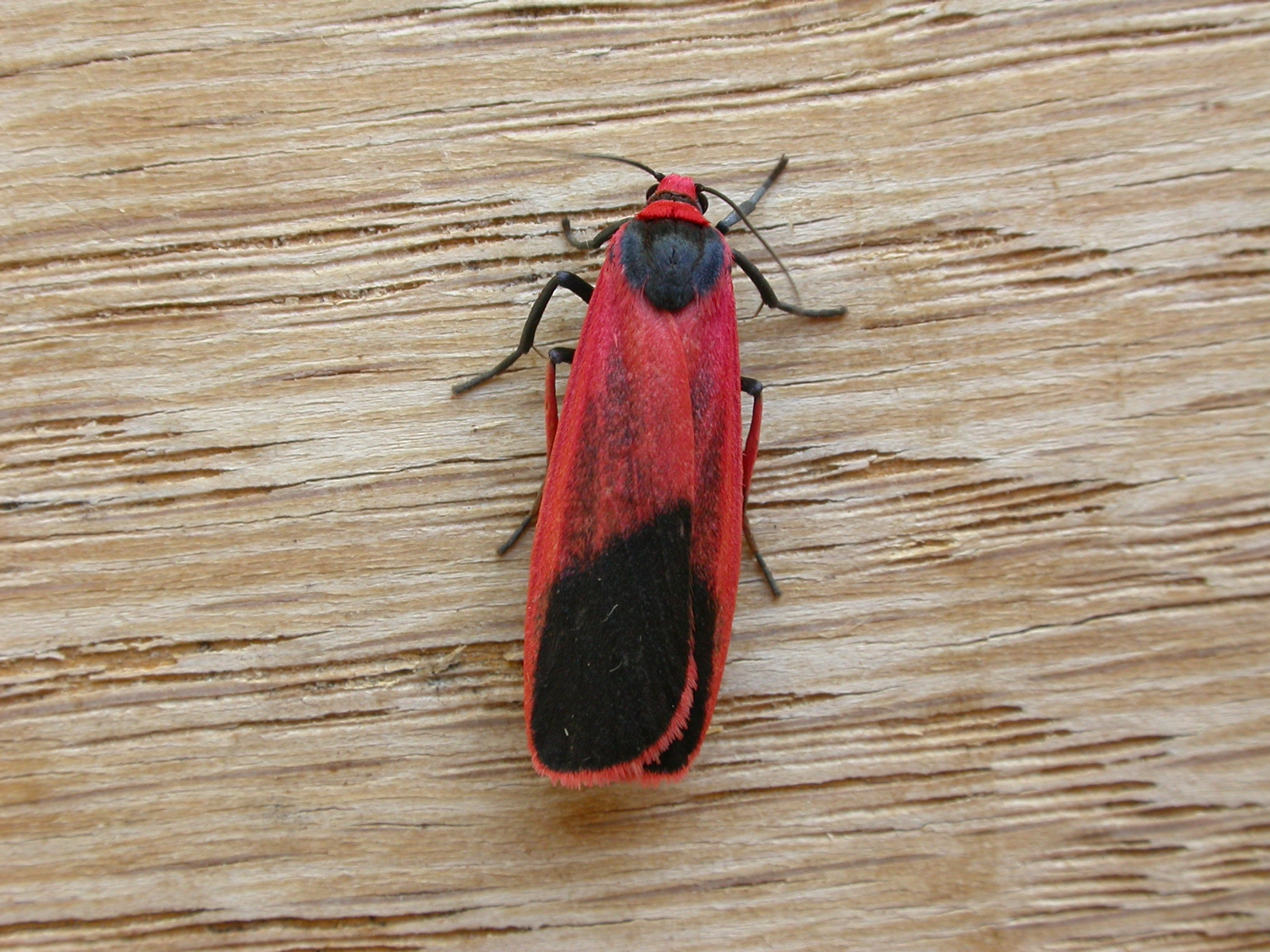

Scientific classification
- Domain: Eukaryota
- Kingdom: Animalia
- Phylum: Arthropoda
- Class: Insecta
- Order: Lepidoptera
- Superfamily: Noctuoidea
- Family: Erebidae
- Subfamily: Arctiinae
- Genus: Scoliacma
- Species: S. bicolora

Binomial name
- Scoliacma bicolora (Boisduval, 1832)

Synonyms
- Lithosia bicolora Boisduval, 1832; Lithosia rubratra Tepper, 1882; Lithosia rubrata Hampson, 1900

= Scoliacma bicolora =

Species of moth

Scoliacma bicolora is a species of moth of the family Erebidae. It is known from Papua New Guinea and most of Australia, including the Australian Capital Territory, New South Wales, Queensland, South Australia, Tasmania and Victoria.

The wingspan is about 25 mm. Adults are half scarlet and half black.

The larvae feed on liverworts, mosses and lichens.
