= Scoliacma fuscofascia =

Scientific classification
- Domain: Eukaryota
- Kingdom: Animalia
- Phylum: Arthropoda
- Class: Insecta
- Order: Lepidoptera
- Superfamily: Noctuoidea
- Family: Erebidae
- Subfamily: Arctiinae
- Genus: Scoliacma
- Species: S. fuscofascia

Binomial name
- Scoliacma fuscofascia (Rothschild, 1913)

Synonyms
- Nishada fuscofascia Rothschild, 1913

Species of moth

Scoliacma fuscofascia is a moth in the family Erebidae. It was described by Walter Rothschild in 1913. It is found in Papua New Guinea, where it is restricted to the Central Mountain Range.
