= Scoliacma hampsoni =

Scientific classification
- Domain: Eukaryota
- Kingdom: Animalia
- Phylum: Arthropoda
- Class: Insecta
- Order: Lepidoptera
- Superfamily: Noctuoidea
- Family: Erebidae
- Subfamily: Arctiinae
- Genus: Scoliacma
- Species: S. hampsoni

Binomial name
- Scoliacma hampsoni Bethune-Baker, 1904

Synonyms
- Ilema nivea Bethune-Baker, 1904; Tigrioides albescens Rothschild, 1912

Species of moth

Scoliacma hampsoni is a moth in the family Erebidae. It was described by George Thomas Bethune-Baker in 1904. It is found in Papua New Guinea.
