= Scoliacma albicostata =

Scientific classification
- Kingdom: Animalia
- Phylum: Arthropoda
- Class: Insecta
- Order: Lepidoptera
- Superfamily: Noctuoidea
- Family: Erebidae
- Subfamily: Arctiinae
- Genus: Scoliacma
- Species: S. albicostata

Binomial name
- Scoliacma albicostata Hampson, 1918

Species of moth

Scoliacma albicostata is a moth in the family Erebidae. It was described by George Hampson in 1918. It is found in Papua New Guinea.

== Taxonomy ==
The status of this species is uncertain. It is probably a female of Lambula flavobrunnea.
