= Scoliacma virginea =

Scientific classification
- Domain: Eukaryota
- Kingdom: Animalia
- Phylum: Arthropoda
- Class: Insecta
- Order: Lepidoptera
- Superfamily: Noctuoidea
- Family: Erebidae
- Subfamily: Arctiinae
- Genus: Scoliacma
- Species: S. virginea

Binomial name
- Scoliacma virginea Bethune-Baker, 1908

Species of moth

Scoliacma virginea is a moth in the family Erebidae. It was described by George Thomas Bethune-Baker in 1908. It is found in New Guinea. The habitat consists of mountainous areas.
