= Teratopora =

Scientific classification
- Kingdom: Animalia
- Phylum: Arthropoda
- Class: Insecta
- Order: Lepidoptera
- Superfamily: Noctuoidea
- Family: Erebidae
- Subfamily: Arctiinae
- Subtribe: Lithosiina
- Genus: Teratopora; Meyrick, 1889

Genus of moths

Teratopora is a genus of moths in the family Erebidae.

== Species ==
- Teratopora acosma (Turner, 1899)
- Teratopora agramma Hampson, 1914
- Teratopora haplodes Meyrick, 1889
- Teratopora unifascia (Rothschild, 1912)
