= Scoliacma xuthopis =

Scientific classification
- Kingdom: Animalia
- Phylum: Arthropoda
- Class: Insecta
- Order: Lepidoptera
- Superfamily: Noctuoidea
- Family: Erebidae
- Subfamily: Arctiinae
- Genus: Scoliacma
- Species: S. xuthopis

Binomial name
- Scoliacma xuthopis Hampson, 1914

Species of moth

Scoliacma xuthopis is a moth in the family Erebidae. It was described by George Hampson in 1914.

== Distribution ==
It is found in Australia, where it has been recorded from Western Australia.
