= E.R. Schiffahrt =

E.R. Schiffahrt GmbH & Cie. KG
- Type: GmbH & Co. KG
- Industry: Ship management
- Founded: 1998
- Defunct: 2018
- Fate: Ceased operating under its original name in after being acquired by the Zeaborn Group
- Headquarters: Hamburg, Germany
- Key people: Nils Aden, Erik Kruse, Helge Bartels, Isabelle Rickmers
- Number of employees: 3500
- Website: www.er-ship.com/

E.R. Schiffahrt GmbH & Cie. kg was a shipping company with headquarters in Hamburg. It employs around 3,500 staff at sea and on land (as of 2016). In 2018 following acquisition by Zeaborn Group, E.R. Schiffahrt and Rickmers Shipmanagement were combined as Zeaborn Ship Management.

In April 2012, E.R. Schiffahrt joined the United Nations Global Compact. The company hereby undertakes to link social, ecological and economic aspects and to document actively implemented measures as part of an annual progress report. The voluntary commitment to responsible corporate behaviour is focused on ten principles from the fields of human rights, employment standards, environmental protection and the fight against corruption.

In addition, E.R. Schiffahrt is a founding and member of the steering committee of the ‘Container Ship Safety Forum’ (CSSF). The Business-to-Business network was founded in May 2014 in order to increase safety on board, as well as to improve management practices.

Alongside ship management (technical management and crewing), the company offered services in the fields of chartering, new-build planning, modifications and insurance to its customers.

== History ==
The company's roots lie in the foundation in 1992 of Emissionshaus Nordcapital by Erck Rickmers and his brother Bertram Rickmers. Initially run together, the brothers parted company in 1996, with Erck Rickmers continuing to manage Nordcapital and founding the shipping company E.R. Schiffahrt two years later. The company's first new build was the container ship E.R. Hamburg, brought into service in September 1998 with a capacity of 2,226 TEU.

In the beginning, E.R. Schiffahrt focused on the operation and chartering of container vessels, but from 2006 expanded into operating offshore vessels and Bulk carriers. In January 2008, Erck Rickmers merged shipping companies E.R. Schiffahrt and E.R. Offshore, along with investment company Nordcapital, under the umbrella of E.R. Capital Holding.

In 2012, E.R. Schiffahrt merged with ship management company Komrowski and its subsidiary Blue Star under the umbrella of Blue Star Holding. The umbrella company's capital majority is held by E.R. Capital Holding.

== Fleet ==
E.R. Schiffahrt operated a fleet of more than 90 vessels, among them four Ultra large container ships and more than forty Post-Panamax Class container ships.

== Bibliography ==
- Erik Lindner: 175 Jahre Rickmers. Hoffmann und Campe 2009, ISBN 978-3455501117.
