= Scoliacma aroa =

Scientific classification
- Kingdom: Animalia
- Phylum: Arthropoda
- Clade: Pancrustacea
- Class: Insecta
- Order: Lepidoptera
- Superfamily: Noctuoidea
- Family: Erebidae
- Subfamily: Arctiinae
- Genus: Scoliacma
- Species: S. aroa

Binomial name
- Scoliacma aroa Bethune-Baker, 1904

Synonyms
- Melanaema apiciplaga Rothschild, 1913

Species of moth

Scoliacma aroa is a moth in the family Erebidae. It was described by George Thomas Bethune-Baker in 1904. It is found in Papua New Guinea.

== Bibliography ==
- Pitkin, Brian & Jenkins, Paul. "Search results Family: Arctiidae". Butterflies and Moths of the World. Natural History Museum, London.
