= Teratopora acosma =

Scientific classification
- Domain: Eukaryota
- Kingdom: Animalia
- Phylum: Arthropoda
- Class: Insecta
- Order: Lepidoptera
- Superfamily: Noctuoidea
- Family: Erebidae
- Subfamily: Arctiinae
- Genus: Teratopora
- Species: T. acosma

Binomial name
- Teratopora acosma (Turner, 1899)

Synonyms
- Tigrioides acosma Turner, 1899; Teratopora irregularis Hampson, 1900

Species of moth

Teratopora acosma is a moth in the family Erebidae. It was described by Alfred Jefferis Turner in 1899. It is found in Australia, where it has been recorded from Queensland and Victoria. The habitat consists of wet tropical areas.
