= Scoliacma fasciata =

Scientific classification
- Domain: Eukaryota
- Kingdom: Animalia
- Phylum: Arthropoda
- Class: Insecta
- Order: Lepidoptera
- Superfamily: Noctuoidea
- Family: Erebidae
- Subfamily: Arctiinae
- Genus: Scoliacma
- Species: S. fasciata

Binomial name
- Scoliacma fasciata (Aurivillius, 1920)

Synonyms
- Pusiola fasciata Aurivillius, 1920

Species of moth

Scoliacma fasciata is a moth in the family Erebidae. It was described by Per Olof Christopher Aurivillius in 1920. It is found in Australia, where it has been recorded from Queensland.
