= Teratopora agramma =

Scientific classification
- Kingdom: Animalia
- Phylum: Arthropoda
- Class: Insecta
- Order: Lepidoptera
- Superfamily: Noctuoidea
- Family: Erebidae
- Subfamily: Arctiinae
- Genus: Teratopora
- Species: T. agramma

Binomial name
- Teratopora agramma Hampson, 1914

Species of moth

Teratopora agramma is a moth in the family Erebidae. It was described by George Hampson in 1914. It is found on New Guinea, where it has been recorded from Papua New Guinea and Papua (eastern part of the Central Mountain Range). The habitat consists of mountainous areas.
