= Scoliacma heringi =

Scientific classification
- Domain: Eukaryota
- Kingdom: Animalia
- Phylum: Arthropoda
- Class: Insecta
- Order: Lepidoptera
- Superfamily: Noctuoidea
- Family: Erebidae
- Subfamily: Arctiinae
- Genus: Scoliacma
- Species: S. heringi

Binomial name
- Scoliacma heringi Gaede, 1925

Synonyms
- Scoliacma flava De Vos & Van Mastrigt, 2007

Species of moth

Scoliacma heringi is a moth in the family Erebidae. It was described by Max Gaede in 1925. It is found in Papua New Guinea. The habitat consists of mountainous areas.
