= Scoliacma albogrisea =

Scientific classification
- Domain: Eukaryota
- Kingdom: Animalia
- Phylum: Arthropoda
- Class: Insecta
- Order: Lepidoptera
- Superfamily: Noctuoidea
- Family: Erebidae
- Subfamily: Arctiinae
- Genus: Scoliacma
- Species: S. albogrisea

Binomial name
- Scoliacma albogrisea (Rothschild, 1912)

Synonyms
- Tigrioides albogrisea Rothschild, 1912

Species of moth

Scoliacma albogrisea is a moth in the family Erebidae. It was described by Walter Rothschild in 1912. It is found in Papua New Guinea.
