= Scoliacma pactolias =

Scientific classification
- Kingdom: Animalia
- Phylum: Arthropoda
- Class: Insecta
- Order: Lepidoptera
- Superfamily: Noctuoidea
- Family: Erebidae
- Subfamily: Arctiinae
- Genus: Scoliacma
- Species: S. pactolias

Binomial name
- Scoliacma pactolias Meyrick, 1886

Species of moth

Scoliacma pactolias is a moth in the family Erebidae. It was described by Edward Meyrick in 1886. It is found in Australia, where it has been recorded from the Australian Capital Territory, New South Wales, Queensland, South Australia, Tasmania and Victoria.
