= Scoliacma ligneofusca =

Scientific classification
- Domain: Eukaryota
- Kingdom: Animalia
- Phylum: Arthropoda
- Class: Insecta
- Order: Lepidoptera
- Superfamily: Noctuoidea
- Family: Erebidae
- Subfamily: Arctiinae
- Genus: Scoliacma
- Species: S. ligneofusca

Binomial name
- Scoliacma ligneofusca (Rothschild, 1912)

Synonyms
- Ilema ligneofusca Rothschild, 1912

Species of moth

Scoliacma ligneofusca is a moth in the family Erebidae. It was described by Walter Rothschild in 1912. It is found in Papua New Guinea. The habitat consists of coastal lowland areas.
