= Teratopora unifascia =

Scientific classification
- Domain: Eukaryota
- Kingdom: Animalia
- Phylum: Arthropoda
- Class: Insecta
- Order: Lepidoptera
- Superfamily: Noctuoidea
- Family: Erebidae
- Subfamily: Arctiinae
- Genus: Teratopora
- Species: T. unifascia

Binomial name
- Teratopora unifascia (Rothschild, 1912)

Synonyms
- Ilema unifascia Rothschild, 1912; Teratopora plicata Hampson, 1914

Species of moth

Teratopora unifascia is a moth in the family Erebidae. It was described by Walter Rothschild in 1912. It is found in New Guinea, where it has been recorded from Papua New Guinea and Papua. The habitat consists of lowland areas.
