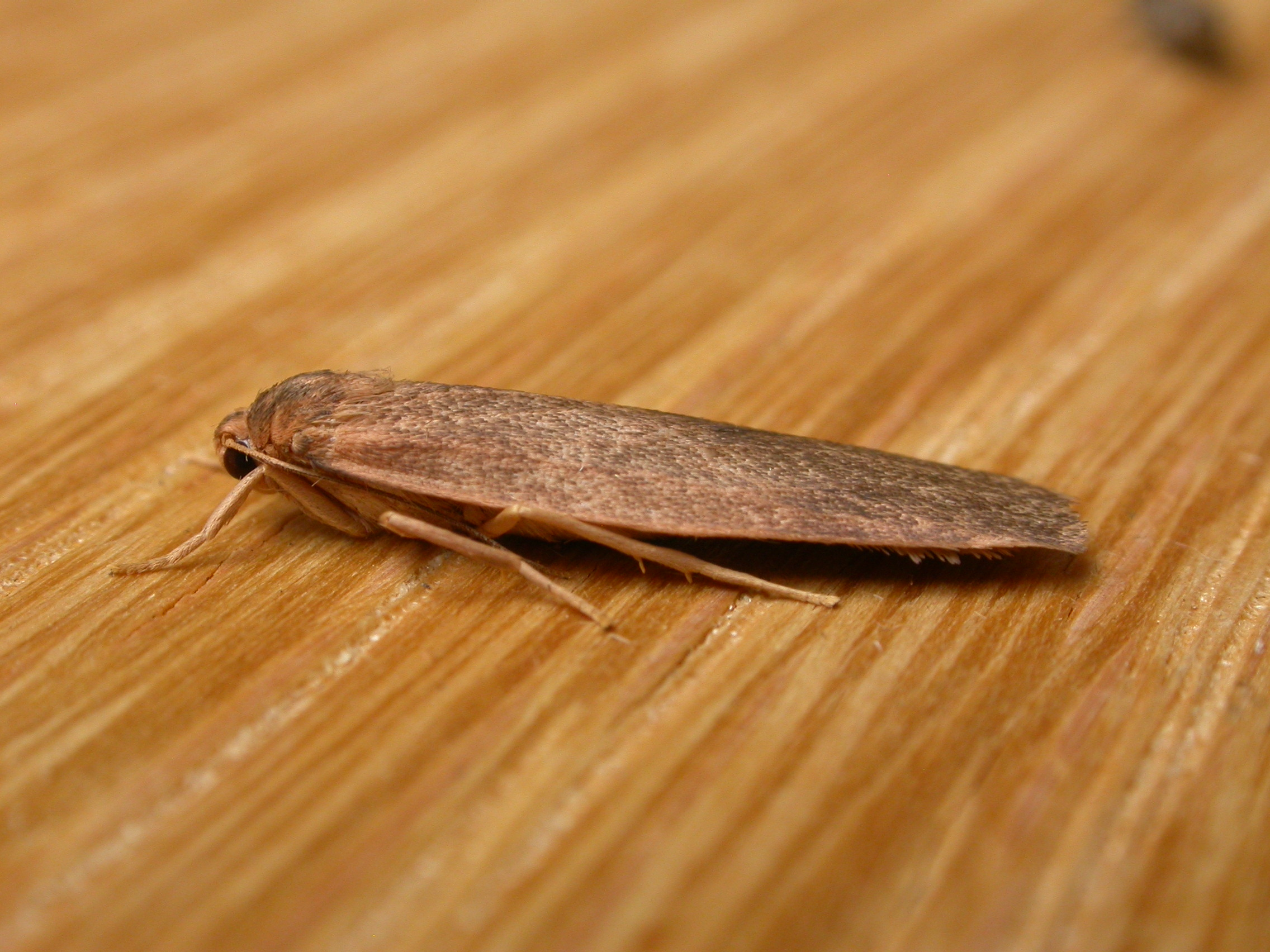

Scientific classification
- Kingdom: Animalia
- Phylum: Arthropoda
- Class: Insecta
- Order: Lepidoptera
- Superfamily: Noctuoidea
- Family: Erebidae
- Subfamily: Arctiinae
- Genus: Scoliacma
- Species: S. nana

Binomial name
- Scoliacma nana (Walker, 1854)

Synonyms
- Lithosia nana Walker, 1854; Scoliacma orthotoma Meyrick, 1886; Tigrioides spilarcha Meyrick, 1886

= Scoliacma nana =

Species of moth

Scoliacma nana is a moth of the family Erebidae first described by Francis Walker in 1854. It is found in the Australian states of New South Wales and Queensland.
