= Scoliacma laniata =

Scientific classification
- Kingdom: Animalia
- Phylum: Arthropoda
- Class: Insecta
- Order: Lepidoptera
- Superfamily: Noctuoidea
- Family: Erebidae
- Subfamily: Arctiinae
- Genus: Scoliacma
- Species: S. laniata

Binomial name
- Scoliacma laniata (Hampson, 1914)

Synonyms
- Tigrioides laniata Hampson, 1914

Species of moth

Scoliacma laniata is a moth in the family Erebidae. It was described by George Hampson in 1914. It is found in Papua New Guinea.
