= Scoliacma suzannae =

Scientific classification
- Domain: Eukaryota
- Kingdom: Animalia
- Phylum: Arthropoda
- Class: Insecta
- Order: Lepidoptera
- Superfamily: Noctuoidea
- Family: Erebidae
- Subfamily: Arctiinae
- Genus: Scoliacma
- Species: S. suzannae

Binomial name
- Scoliacma suzannae De Vos, 2008

Species of moth

Scoliacma suzannae is a moth in the family Erebidae. It was described by Rob de Vos in 2008. It is found in Papua, Indonesia.
