= Scoliacma adrasta =

Scientific classification
- Domain: Eukaryota
- Kingdom: Animalia
- Phylum: Arthropoda
- Class: Insecta
- Order: Lepidoptera
- Superfamily: Noctuoidea
- Family: Erebidae
- Subfamily: Arctiinae
- Genus: Scoliacma
- Species: S. adrasta

Binomial name
- Scoliacma adrasta (Turner, 1940)

Synonyms
- Threnosia adrasta Turner, 1940

Species of moth

Scoliacma adrasta is a moth in the family Erebidae. It was described by Alfred Jefferis Turner in 1940. It is found in Australia, where it has been recorded from Tasmania.
