= Rickmers Group =

Shipping company

- Industry: Marine transportation
- Founded: 1834
- Defunct: 2017
- Headquarters: Hamburg, Germany
- Area served: Worldwide
- Parent: Rickmers Holding AG
- Website: rickmers.com

The Rickmers Group was an international provider of services for the maritime industry, a vessel owner and an ocean freight carrier. The group's head offices are located in Hamburg and Singapore. The group of companies is divided in three segments: Maritime Assets, Maritime Services and Rickmers-Linie. Following insolvency proceedings in 2017 the assets were acquired by Zeaborn Group and Bertram Rickmers The following year Rickmers and E.R. Schiffahrt were combined as Zeaborn Ship Management.

In the Maritime Assets segment the Rickmers Group acted as Asset Manager for its own vessels and also for those of third parties and is in charge of related shipping projects. In the Maritime Services business segment the Group provides ship management services, whereas in the Rickmers-Linie business segment the Rickmers Group operated as a shipping line for breakbulk, heavy lift and project cargo, and additionally offered individual voyages.

== Figures ==
Rickmers Group operated a fleet of 130 ships with more than 1,720 seafarers and over 470 staff ashore (as at 31 Dec 2015). A total of 95 companies have been included in the consolidated financial statements in the year 2015.

== History ==
The Rickmers family has been in the shipping industry for more than 180 years. Nucleus of the present day Rickmers Group was the Rickmers Werft shipyard founded in 1834 by Rickmer Clasen Rickmers in Bremerhaven. R.C. Rickmers was born in 1807 as the son of fisherman Peter Andreas and his wife Deike on Helgoland. “Fear God – act justly and dread no one” was his dictum in life when he went into business as a young shipbuilder.

Today, the brothers Bertram R.C. Rickmers and Erck Rickmers, fifth-generation descendants of Rickmer Clasen Rickmers, operate two legally independent companies. Bertram R. C. Rickmers, who left the family firm in 1982, went into business in Hamburg as shipbroker and shipowner with establishing his first company (MCC Marine Contracting and Consulting). Two years later he founded the shipping company Schiffahrtsgesellschaft Reederei B. Rickmers GmbH & Cie. KG and put his first containership Patricia Rickmers into service in 1985.

In the year 2009 the two brothers Bertram R.C. Rickmers and Erck Rickmers teamed up to celebrate 175 years of family history. The celebration included a reception at Hamburg's City Hall and a symposium with speakers on geopolitics and economics.

In the year 2015 Rickmers Group parent Rickmes Holding changed its legal form from limited partnership to stock corporation. Bertram R.C. Rickmers acts as chairman of the supervisory board, with Rickmers Group CEO Ignace Van Meenen and CFO Mark-Ken Erdmann serving as members of the Rickmers Holding AG executive board.

=== Bankruptcy ===
The fiscal year of 2016 ended with a loss of 341 million euros, the debt is around 1.5 billion euros. This also includes 275 million euros, which the investors of company have made available via a high-interest bond with a coupon of 8.875 per cent.
