= Teratopora haplodes =

Scientific classification
- Kingdom: Animalia
- Phylum: Arthropoda
- Class: Insecta
- Order: Lepidoptera
- Superfamily: Noctuoidea
- Family: Erebidae
- Subfamily: Arctiinae
- Genus: Teratopora
- Species: T. haplodes

Binomial name
- Teratopora haplodes Meyrick, 1889

Synonyms
- Tigrioides nephelozona Meyrick, 1889

Species of moth

Teratopora haplodes is a moth in the family Erebidae. It was described by Edward Meyrick in 1889. It is found in New Guinea, where it has been recorded from Papua New Guinea and Papua. The habitat consists of lowland areas.
