= Scoliacma adriani =

Scientific classification
- Domain: Eukaryota
- Kingdom: Animalia
- Phylum: Arthropoda
- Class: Insecta
- Order: Lepidoptera
- Superfamily: Noctuoidea
- Family: Erebidae
- Subfamily: Arctiinae
- Genus: Scoliacma
- Species: S. adriani

Binomial name
- Scoliacma adriani De Vos, 2008

Species of moth

Scoliacma adriani is a moth in the family Erebidae. It was described by Rob de Vos in 2008. It is found in Papua, Indonesia, where it has been recorded from the area south of the Cenderawasih Bay.
