= RPA 12 =

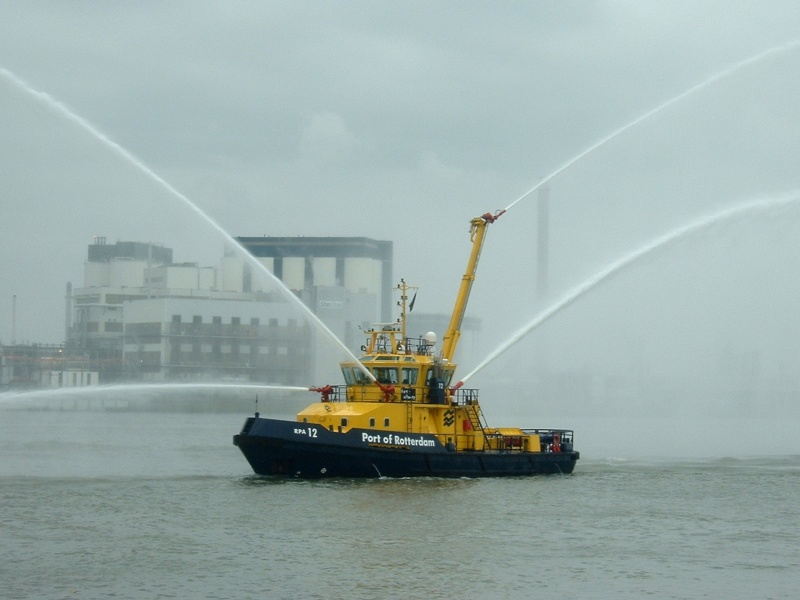
- The RPA 12 in the Port of Rotterdam

History

Netherlands
- Name: RPA 12
- Owner: Rotterdam Port Authority (Gemeentelijk Havenbedrijf Rotterdam)
- Builder: Hull built by Stocznia Tczew. Sp. z.o.o., Tczew, Poland; Fit out built by: B.V. Scheepswerf Damen, Gorinchem, Netherlands
- Yard number: 509201
- Laid down: January 2002
- Christened: 2002
- Identification: IMO number: 9239551; MMSI number: 244050469; ENI number: 02325535; Callsign: PE6168

General characteristics
- Type: Tugboat
- Tonnage: 150 GT; 52 DWT
- Length: 28.78 m (94 ft 5 in)
- Beam: 8.20 m (26 ft 11 in)
- Draught: 2.55 m (8 ft 4 in)
- Depth: 3.80 m (12 ft 6 in)
- Propulsion: Main engine: 2 × Caterpillar Diesels Inc., model 3412E, 12 cyl diesel, 1,318 bhp (983 kW); Propellers: 2 × variable pitch
- Speed: 12.5 kn (23.2 km/h)

RPA 12 is a fireboat built in 2002 and owned by the Port of Rotterdam.

== Numbers ==
- IMO number: IMO 9239551
- MMSI number: 244050469
- Callsign: PE6168
