= Andriani =

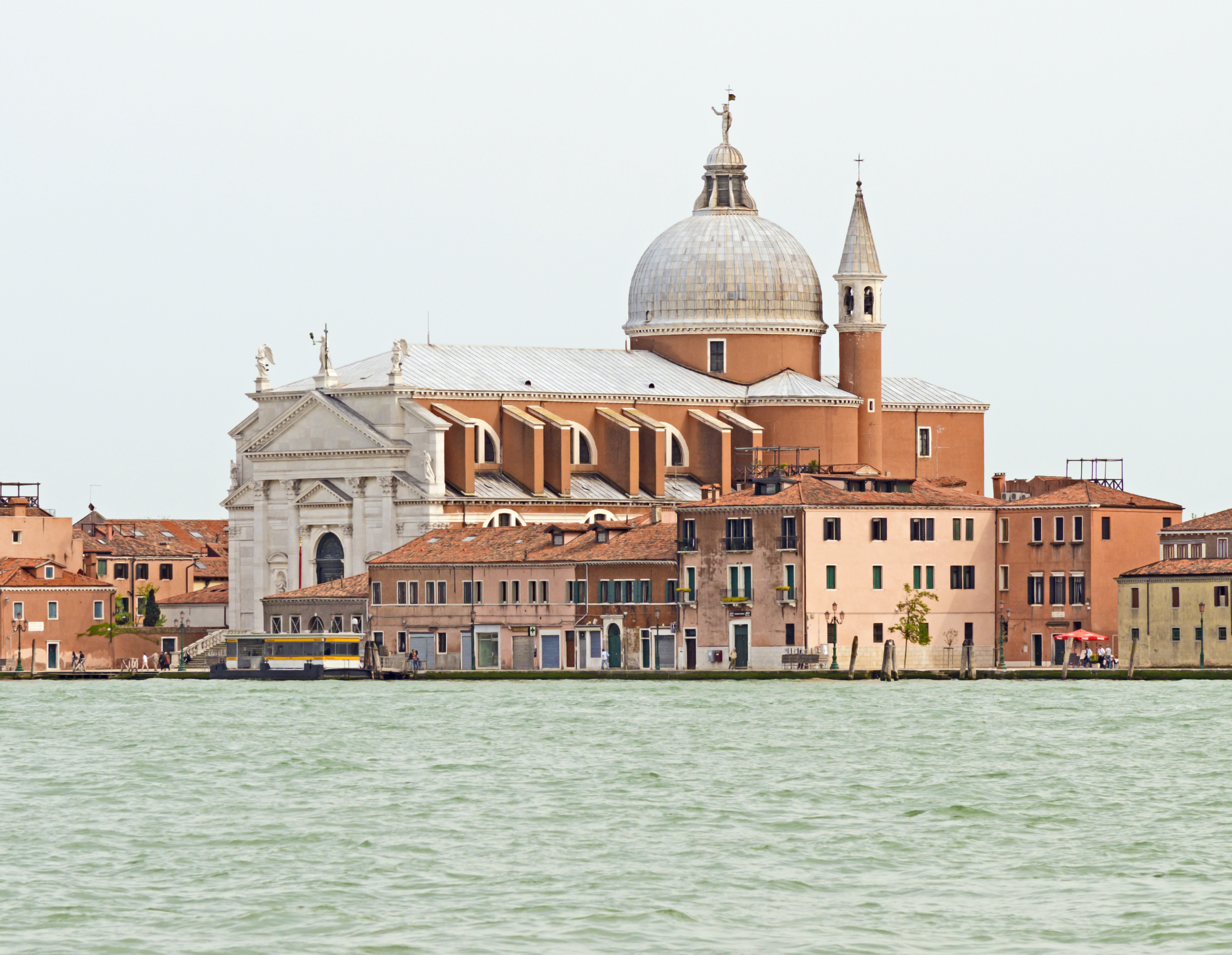
- Pronunciation: /ændriˈɑni/

Origin
- Origin: Venice, Italy
- Derivation: Greek given name Andreas, aner, andrós
- Meaning: man, manly, warrior
- Region of origin: Veneto

Andriani is a feminine forename and a surname that ranks as the 5,713th most common surname globally, with around 99,032 individuals bearing this name. It is derived from the Greek given name Andreas, meaning 'manly' and rooted in the words for 'man' and 'warrior,' Andriani is a patronymic surname, symbolizing strength and valor, with its origins intertwined in the cultural heritage of Venice, Italy. It has the highest incidence in Indonesia, where it ranks 135th in frequency (1:1,382). Additionally, notable occurrences of the surname are found in Italy, Brazil, Argentina, the United States, Australia, the United Arab Emirates, France, Qatar, and Thailand.

== Demographics ==
=== Most Prevalent Regions c. 2014 ===
- Indonesia: 95,661 occurrences (1:1,382)–Rank 135
- Italy: 916 occurrences (1:66,765)–Rank 11,880
- Brazil: 900 occurrences (1:237,860)–Rank 9,170
- Argentina: 516 occurrences (1:82,836)–Rank 6,996
- United States: 334 occurrences (1:1,085,206)–Rank 78,873
- Australia: 71 occurrences (1:380,221)–Rank 31,281
- United Arab Emirates: 68 occurrences (1:134,739)–Rank 11,022
- France: 63 occurrences (1:1,054,329)–Rank 115,549
- Qatar: 62 occurrences (1:38,032)–Rank 3,887
- Thailand: 52 occurrences (1:1,358,430)–Rank 190,094

== Notable Individuals ==
Forename

- Andriani (born 1995), Indonesian cricketer
- Andriani Marshanda (born 1989), Indonesian actress, singer and television host

Surname

- Leonardo Andriani (1895–1948), Italian immigrant
- Maycol Andriani (born 1987), Italian footballer
- Oscar Andriani (1905–1987), Italian actor
- Ottaviano Andriani (born 1974), Italian marathon runner

== See also ==
- Adriani (disambiguation)
- Andrian (disambiguation)
- Adrian
