= HMS Enterprise (H88) =

Royal Navy multi-role survey vessel

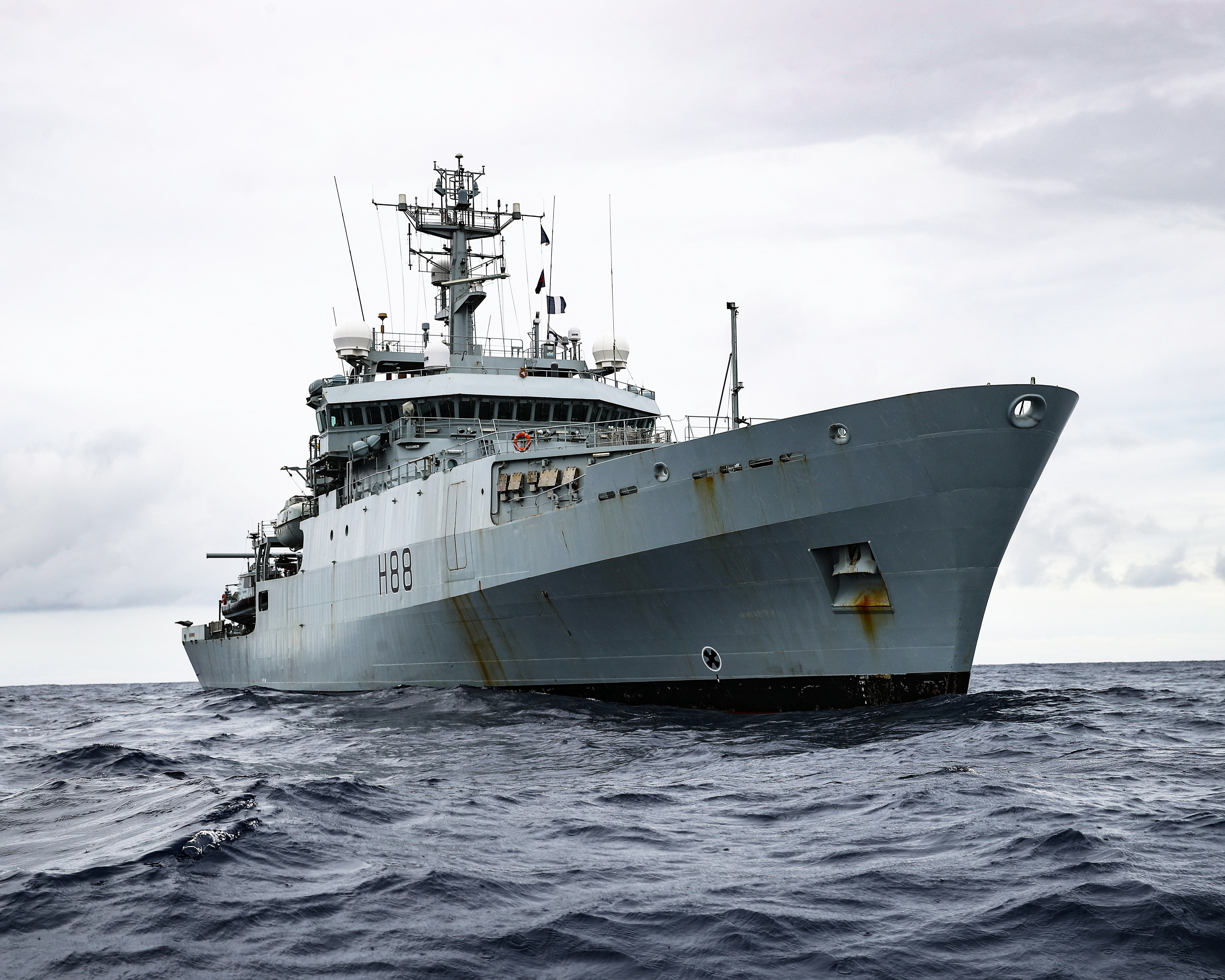
- HMS Enterprise in 2019

History

United Kingdom
- Name: HMS Enterprise
- Ordered: 19 June 2000
- Builder: Appledore Shipbuilders
- Launched: 2 May 2002
- Sponsored by: Lady Sally Forbes
- Commissioned: 17 October 2003
- Decommissioned: 30 March 2023
- Home port: HMNB Devonport, Plymouth
- Identification: Pennant number: H88; International callsign: GXUH; IMO number: 9234020; MMSI number: 232691000
- Motto: Latin: spes aspera levat, lit. 'hope lightens difficulties'
- Nickname(s): Starship
- Status: Sold to Bangladesh Navy
- Badge: On a Field Red, a lion rampant under a star Silver

General characteristics
- Class & type: Echo-class survey vessel
- Displacement: 3,740 t (3,680 long tons; 4,120 short tons)
- Length: 90.6 m (297 ft 3 in)
- Beam: 16.8 m (55 ft 1 in)
- Draught: 5.5 m (18 ft 1 in)
- Propulsion: Diesel-electric; 4.8 MW (6,400 hp) as 3 × diesel generators; 2 × 1.7 MW (2,300 hp) azimuth thrusters; 1 × 0.4 MW (540 hp) bow thruster
- Speed: 15 knots (28 km/h; 17 mph)
- Range: 9,300 nmi (17,200 km) at 12 kn (22 km/h; 14 mph)
- Endurance: 35 days
- Boats & landing craft carried: Survey motor boat
- Complement: 72
- Sensors & processing systems: Integrated survey system (Note: Side-scan sonar; multi-beam echo sounder; single-beam echo sounder; undulating oceanographic profiler; Doppler current log; sub-bottom profiler; bottom sampling equipment.)
- Armament: 2 × Oerlikon 20 mm cannons; 3 × miniguns; 4 × general purpose machine guns

HMS Enterprise, the tenth ship to bear this name, was a multi-role survey vessel - hydrographic oceanographic (SVHO) of the Royal Navy along with HMS Echo that made up the Echo class of survey vessels.

== Design ==
Echo and Enterprise were the first Royal Navy ships to be fitted with azimuth thrusters. Both azimuth thrusters and the bow thruster can be controlled through the integrated navigation system by a joystick providing high manoeuvrability. Complete control and monitoring for power generation and propulsion, together with all auxiliary plant systems, tank gauging and damage control functions is provided through the integrated platform management system (IPMS), accessible through workstations around the ship.

== Role ==
Enterprise and Echo are designed to conduct survey operations in support of submarines or amphibious operations. She can provide almost real-time tailored environmental information, and also has a secondary role as a mine countermeasure tasking authority platform, for which she is capable of embarking a dedicated mine counter measures command team.

== Construction ==
Built by Appledore Shipbuilders under the prime contractor Vosper Thornycroft, Enterprise was launched on 27 April 2002, officially named by the ship's sponsor, Lady Sally Forbes, at her naming ceremony on 2 May 2002, and commissioned on 18 October 2003. She is designed and built to Lloyd's Naval Ship Rules.

== Crewing ==
Enterprise's crew consists of 72 personnel, with 48 on board at any one time, working a cycle of 70 days on, 30 days off. The ship can accommodate 81 personnel if necessary. The ship was operationally available 330 days a year. In support of this high availability, all accommodation and recreational facilities are designed for an unusual (in a warship) degree of comfort. All personnel share double cabins with private facilities, except the captain and executive officer who both have single cabins.

== Operational history ==
=== 2003–2010 ===
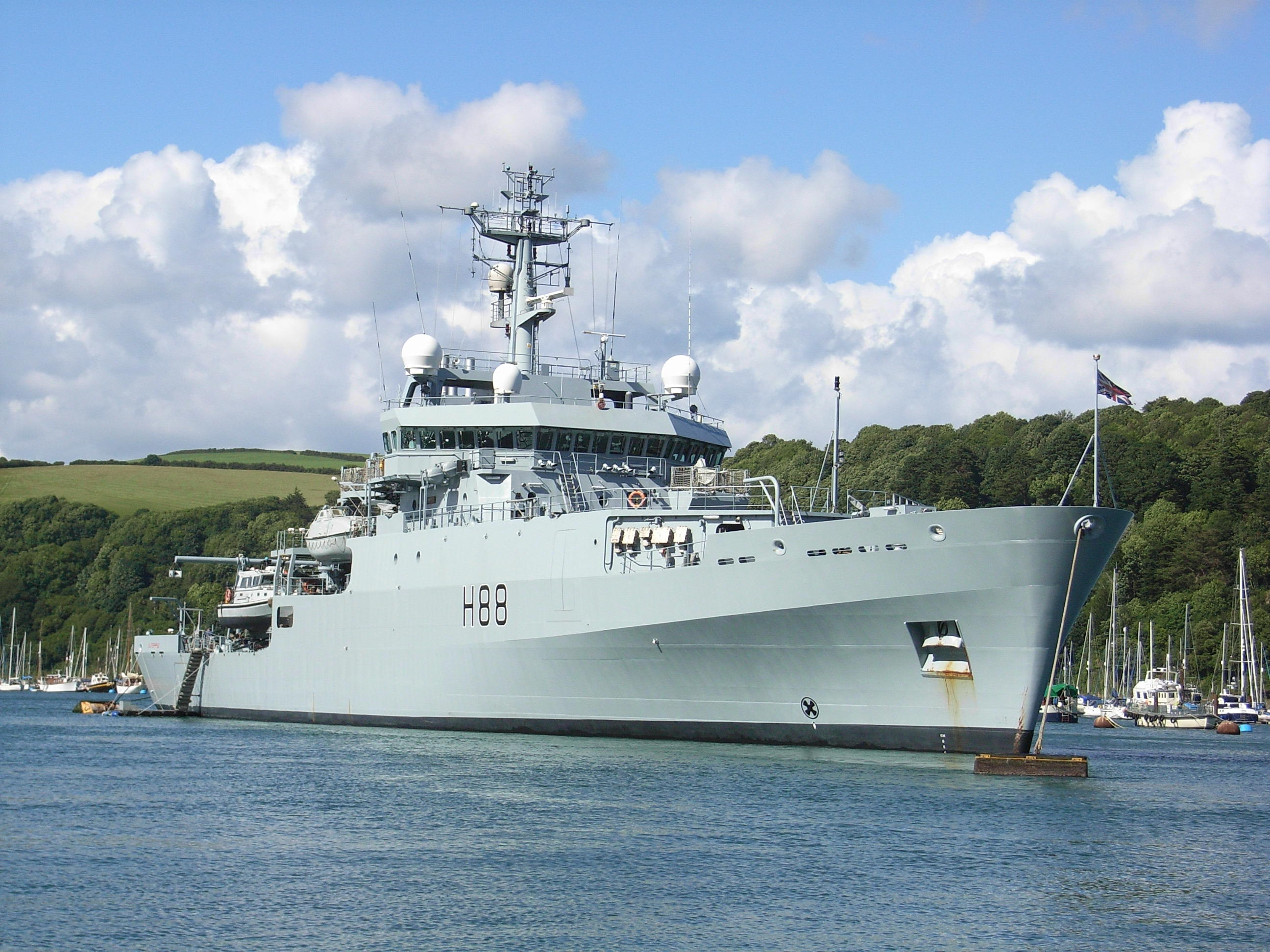
HMS Enterprise in 2008

Enterprise's first operational overseas deployment was to the Mediterranean in October 2004, returning to Devonport in April 2005. She participated in a NATO exercise and conducted oceanographic and hydrographic surveys.

Enterprise sailed in September 2005 to conduct survey operations in the Gulf of Aden and Somali Basin. She also conducted a collaborative hydrographic survey with the Saudi military.

In 2007 Enterprise deployed for 19 months to West Africa, South Africa, the Indian Ocean and the Persian Gulf. While in the Persian Gulf she worked off the coast of Iraq in support of the UK and Iraqi governments.

Enterprise deployed in June 2009 for two years on an extended deployment to West Africa spending three months there before travelling through the Mediterranean to begin operations east of Suez later in the year.

=== 2011–2023 ===
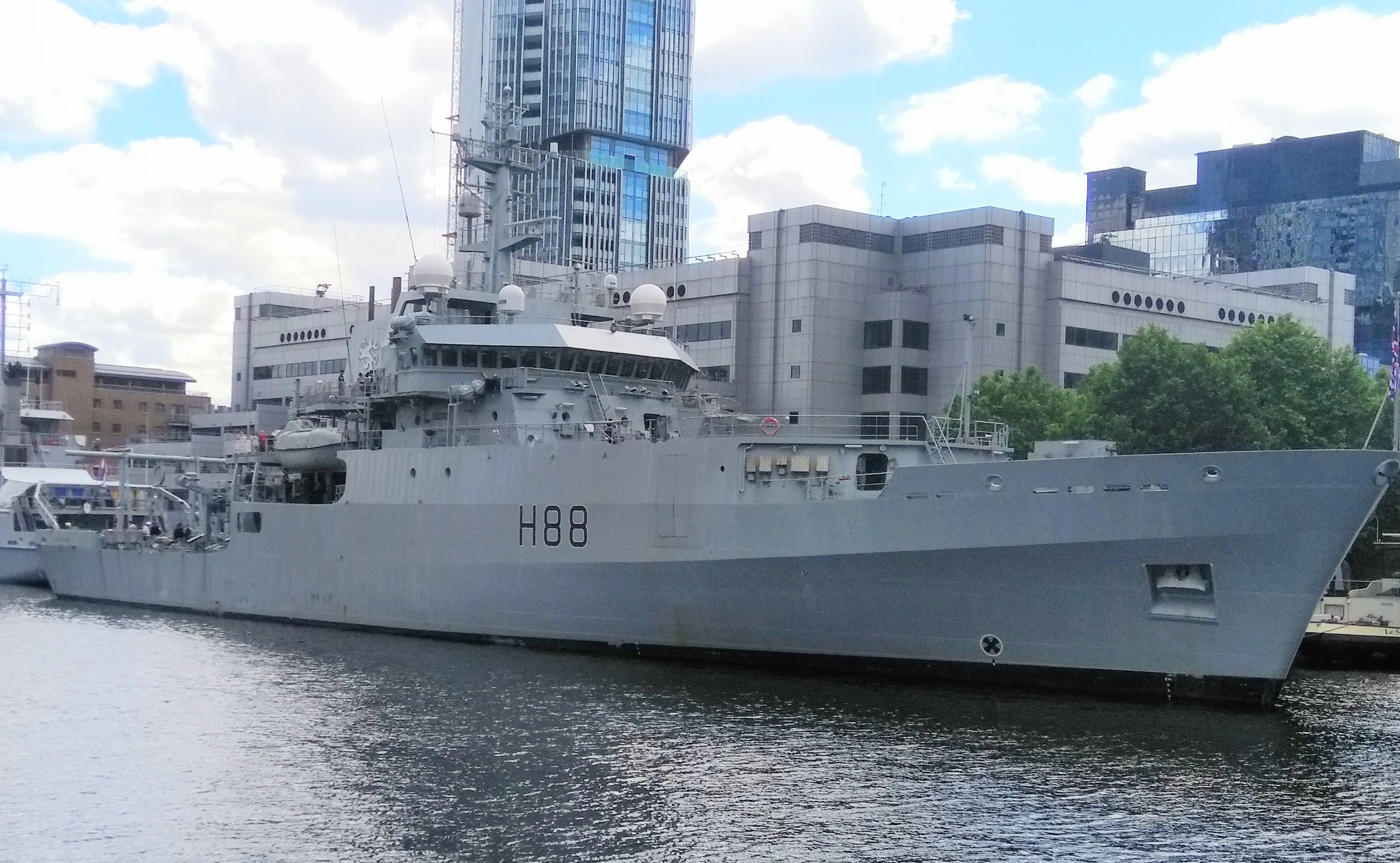
Enterprise moored at South Dock in London

On 10 June 2011, Enterprise returned to Devonport, having covered over 50,000 miles (80,000 km) during the deployment.

In August 2014, Enterprise evacuated around 110 British and EU citizens and diplomatic staff from Libya to Malta due to heightened violence during the Libyan Civil War. One of those evacuated was Salman Abedi, who later carried out the Manchester Arena bombing in 2017.

In June 2015, Enterprise replaced HMS Bulwark in the mission to rescue migrants crossing the Mediterranean from Libya to Italy. By December 2015, Enterprise had been responsible for rescuing more than 2600 migrants. By December 2016, this number had risen to over 9000 before Enterprise was finally relieved by Echo. Among the migrants rescued by HMS Enterprise was Salman Abedi, the Libyan national who later went on to murder 22 people, including 7 children, at the Manchester Arena terrorist bombing on 22 May 2017. In recognition of her contribution to the European Union's Operation Sophia and her lifesaving work, the ship was awarded the Firmin Sword of Peace, an award given to units of the UK Armed Forces who have gone above and beyond their normal role.

On 9 January 2017, it was announced Enterprise had deployed to the South Atlantic to perform patrol tasks normally carried out by the Falkland Islands patrol vessel, HMS Clyde, while Clyde underwent three months of maintenance in South Africa. Aside from patrol duties, Enterprise was also tasked with updating charts of the region used by seafarers during her deployment. Enterprise returned to Devonport on 18 April 2017 having steamed 150,000 miles (240,000 km) and visited 20 countries over a period of nearly three years. Upon her return to the UK Enterprise underwent a short refit in Falmouth prior to returning to operations.

Sailing from Devonport on 29 June 2017, Enterprise deployed in her secondary role as a mine counter measures command ship, assuming the role of flagship of NATO Mine Countermeasures Group 2 (SNMCMG2), primarily operating in the Mediterranean. Returning to the UK a year later, she completed a short refit in Falmouth before deploying to Norway in October 2018 for Exercise Trident Juncture as the mine counter measures command ship for the UK minehunter taskgroup.

In December 2019, she was reported to have sailed through the strait of Taiwan.

On 5 August 2020, she was sent to Beirut to help survey the area around the docks following the 2020 Beirut Docks Explosion.

The ship was decommissioned on 30 March 2023 and sold to the Bangladesh Navy. After a period laid up in Portsmouth, it left under tow by the tug Lady Sarah on 6 May 2026 for overhaul by UK Docks Marine Services in Middlesbrough, arriving on 9 May. It is scheduled to be delivered to Bangladesh in mid-2027.

== Affiliations ==
Enterprise was affiliated with 'D' (Royal Devon Yeomanry) Squadron Royal Wessex Yeomanry and the town of Tiverton, Devon, which includes the freedom of the city with the ship's company able to march through the town with flags flying whilst bearing arms. The ship was also affiliated with two Sea Cadet units; TS Hermes in Tiverton and TS Enterprise in Shirehampton. She was also the affiliated ship of Reading Blue Coat School CCF navy section, the Worshipful Company of Cutlers and Two Moors Primary School, Tiverton.
