= Andrian (name) =

Andrian is a male given name and a German surname. It may refer to the following people:

Given name

- Andrian Bogdan (born 1976), Moldovan football coach and former goalkeeper
- Andrian Candu (born 1975), Moldovan politician, criminal
- Andrian Cucovei (born 1982), Moldovan football defender
- Andrian Dushev (born 1970), Bulgarian sprint canoer
- Andrian Kordon (born 1977), Israeli judoka
- Andrian Mardare (born 1995), Moldovan javelin thrower
- Andrian Negai (born 1985), Moldovan footballer
- Andrian Mardiansyah (born 1978), Indonesian football player and manager
- Andriyan Nikolayev (1929–2004), Soviet cosmonaut
- Andrian Zbîrnea (born 1990), Moldovan weightlifter

Surname

- Leopold Andrian (1875–1951), Austrian author
- Victor Franz von Andrian-Werburg (1813–1858), Austrian politician
- Ulrich von Andrian, German immunologist

== See also ==
- Adrian
