= HMS Echo (H87) =

British Royal Navy (RN) survey vessel

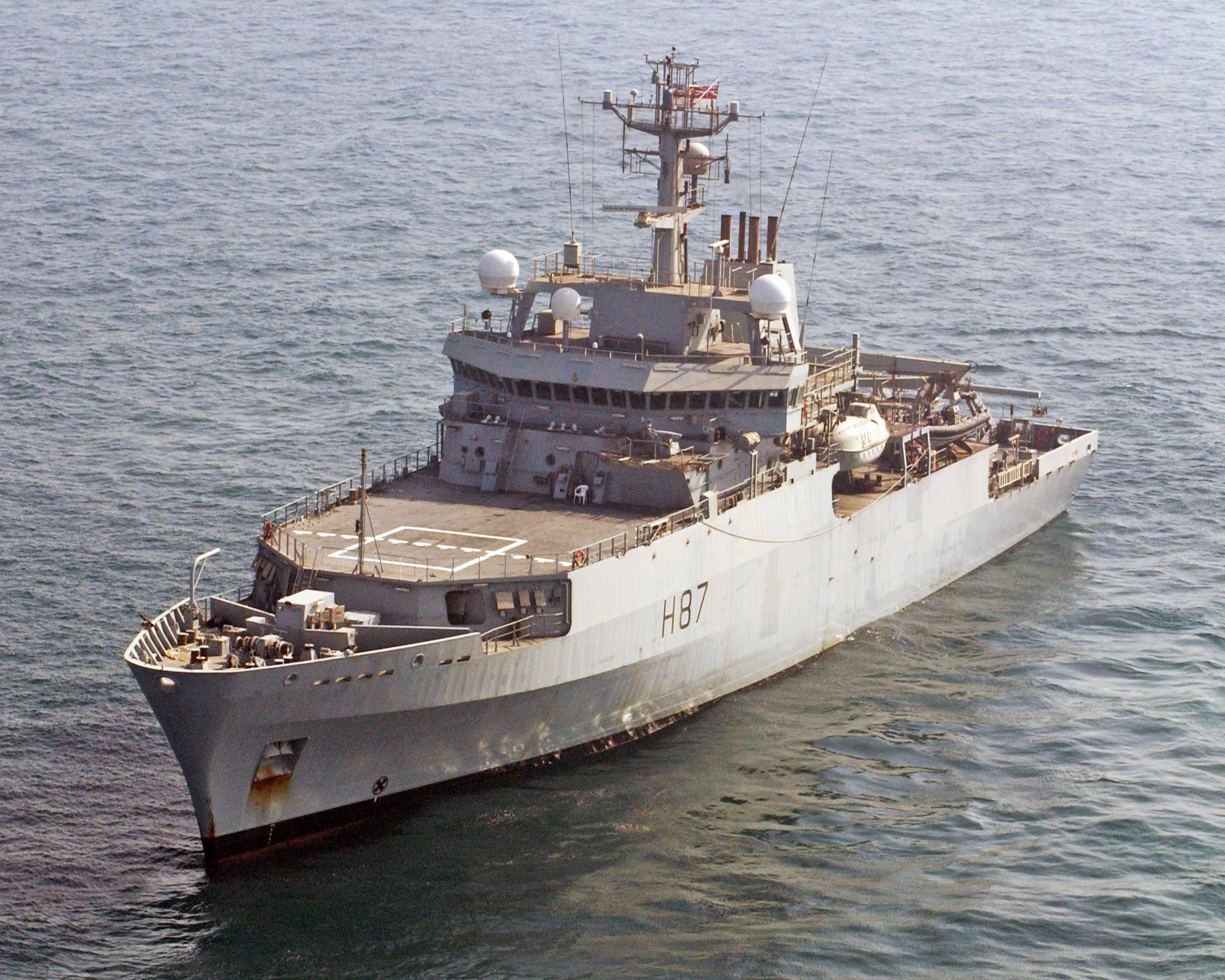
- HMS Echo in 2006

History

United Kingdom
- Ordered: 19 June 2000
- Builder: Appledore Shipbuilders, Bideford
- Launched: 4 March 2002
- Sponsored by: Lady Haddacks
- Commissioned: 7 March 2003
- Decommissioned: 30 June 2022
- Home port: HMNB Devonport, Plymouth
- Identification: Pennant number: H87; International callsign: GAAC; IMO number: 9234018; MMSI number: 232640000
- Motto: Marte et Arte; (Latin: "By Valour and Skill")
- Status: Awaiting disposal
- Badge

General characteristics
- Type: Hydrographic survey vessel
- Displacement: 3,740 t (3,680 long tons; 4,120 short tons)
- Length: 90.6 m (297 ft 3 in)
- Beam: 16.8 m (55 ft 1 in)
- Draught: 5.5 m (18 ft 1 in)
- Propulsion: Diesel-electric; 3 × diesel generators (4.8 MW); 2 × 1.7 MW (2,279 hp) azimuth thrusters; 1 × 0.4 MW (536 hp) bow thruster
- Speed: 15 knots (28 km/h; 17 mph)
- Range: 9,300 nmi (17,200 km; 10,700 mi) at 12 kn (22 km/h; 14 mph)
- Endurance: 35 days
- Boats & landing craft carried: Survey motor boat
- Complement: 72
- Sensors & processing systems: Integrated survey system (Note: Side-scan sonar; Multi-beam echo sounder; Single-beam echo sounder; Undulating oceanographic profiler; Doppler current log; Sub-bottom profiler; Bottom sampling equipment.)
- Armament: 2 × Oerlikon 20 mm cannons; 3 × miniguns; 4 × general purpose machine guns

HMS Echo was the first of two multi-role hydrographic survey ships commissioned by the Royal Navy. With her sister ship, HMS Enterprise, they formed the Echo class of survey vessels. She was built by Appledore Shipbuilders in Devon in 2002 and was the ninth Royal Navy vessel to carry the name. She was retired from service in 2022.

== Design ==
Echo and Enterprise are the first Royal Navy ships to be fitted with azimuth thrusters. Both azimuth thrusters and the bow thruster can be controlled through the Integrated Navigation System by a joystick providing high manoeuvrability. Complete control and monitoring for power generation and propulsion, together with all auxiliary plant systems, tank gauging and damage control functions is provided through the integrated platform management system, accessible through workstations around the ship.

== Role ==
Echo and her sister ship were designed to conduct survey operations in support of submarines or amphibious operations. She could provide almost real-time tailored environmental information, and also had a secondary role as a mine countermeasure tasking authority platform, for which she was capable of embarking a dedicated mine counter measures command team.

== Crewing ==
Echo operated a lean-crewed three-watch rotation system. The total ship's company is 72, with two-thirds of the ship's company on board at any one time. The work cycle of 75 days on followed by 30 days off allowed her sailors to take sufficient leave whilst the ship remained away from her base port for extended periods, potentially for years at a time.

== Operational history ==
Echo was launched on 2 March 2002 and was named on 4 March by Lady Haddacks, wife of Vice Admiral Sir Paul Haddacks. She was accepted into service on 4 October 2002 and formally commissioned on 7 March 2003.

=== 2002–2010 ===
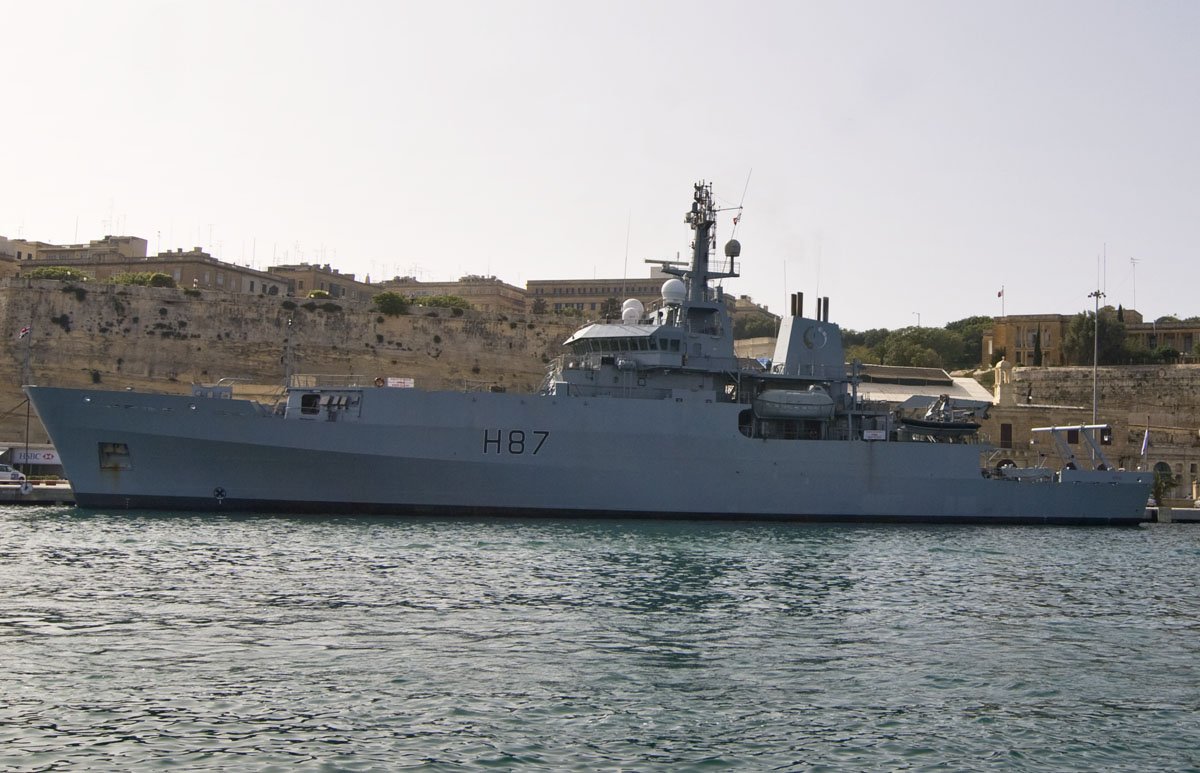
HMS Echo near the Valletta Waterfront, Malta, April 2008

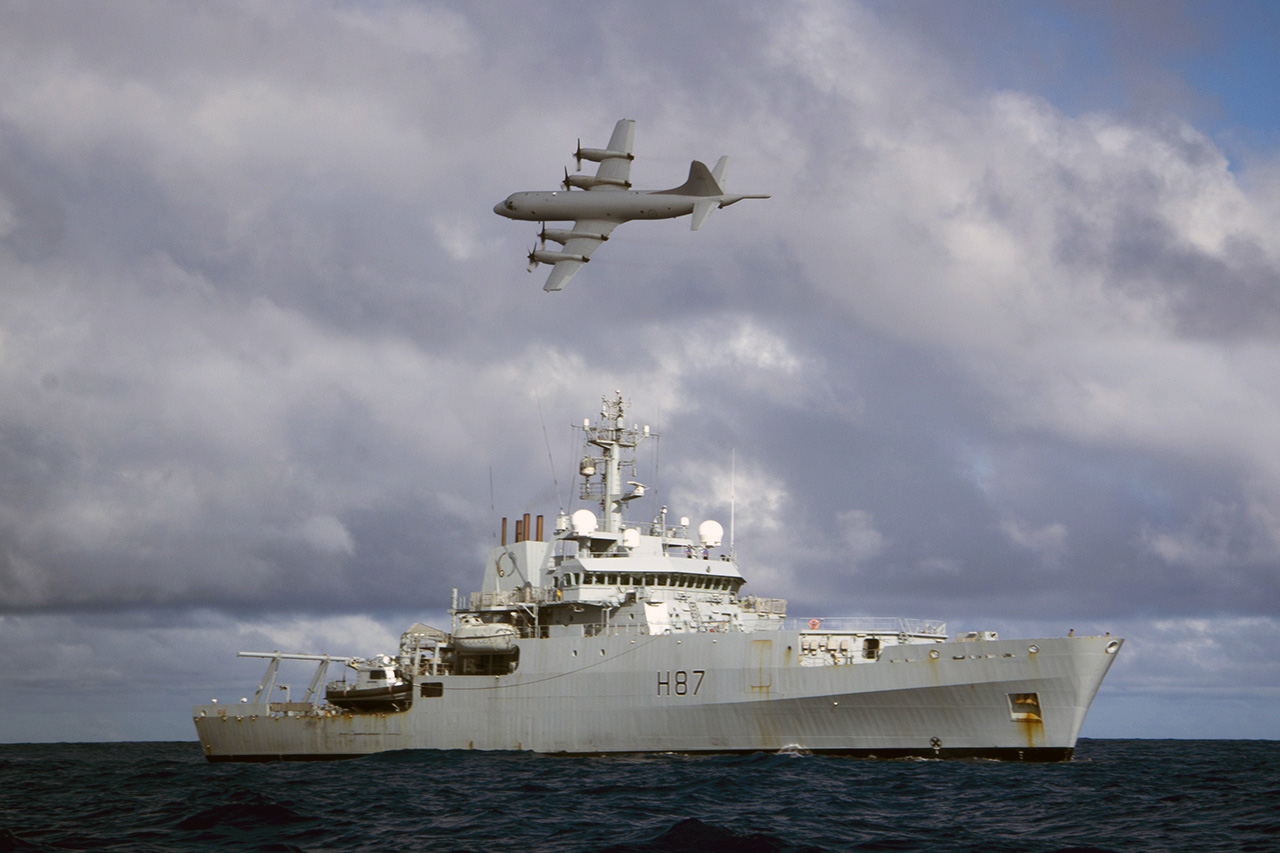
Australian AP-3C Orion flies over Echo during search for MH370 in April 2014

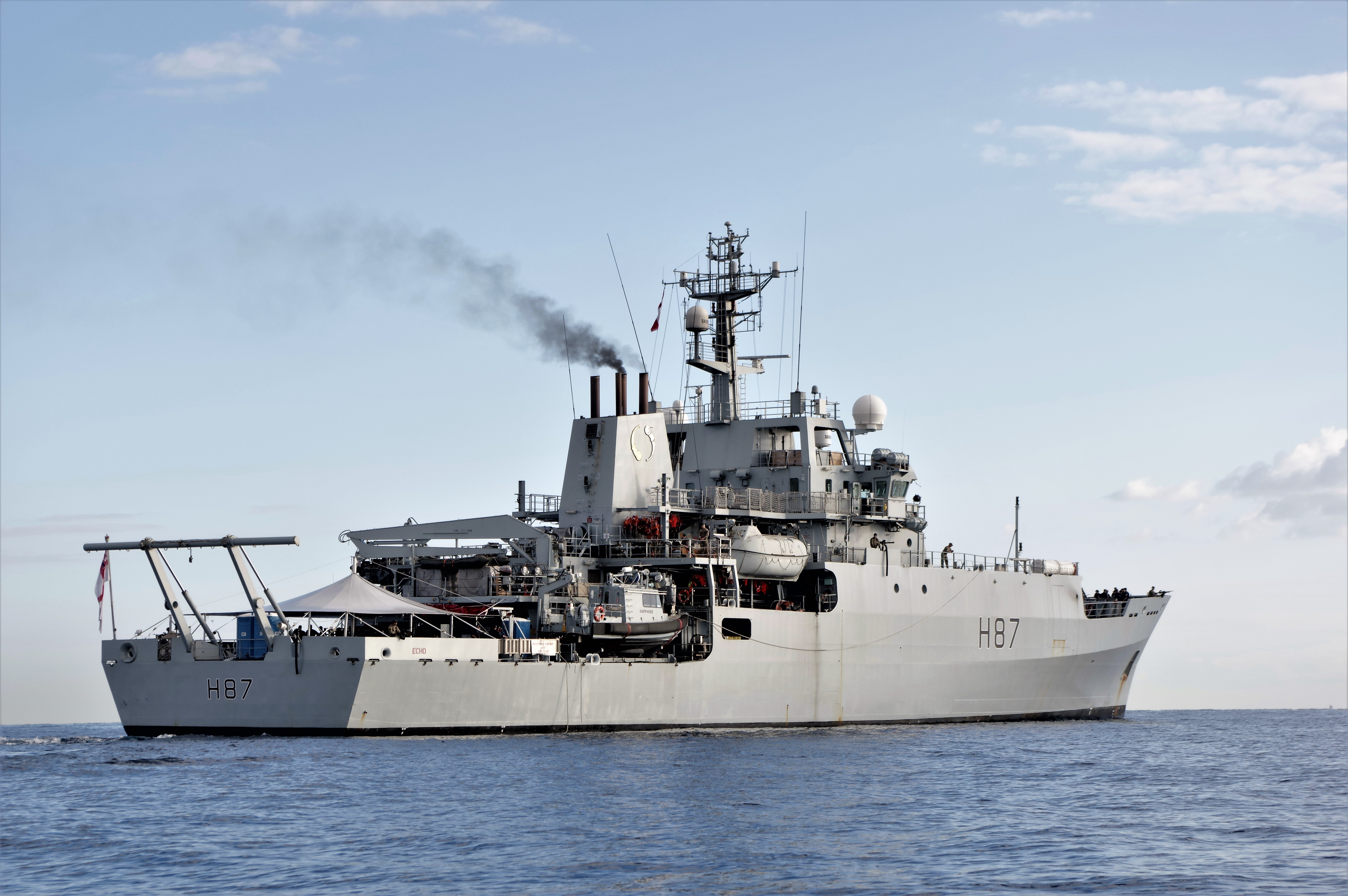
Echo off Valletta, 2016

Echo deployed to the Persian Gulf to conduct survey operations in 2004, returning to the UK in April 2005.

Exploiting her rotational manning system, Echo was deployed on a five-year mission to the Far East, conducting ocean survey and diplomatic visits.

In August 2008 she visited Hong Kong, where her commanding officer laid a wreath at the Stanley Military Cemetery. In October of the same year she visited Busan for the Republic of Korea International Fleet Review. Other visits have been conducted to Bangladesh, Malaysia, Singapore, Brunei, and Indonesia.

=== 2011–2020 ===
February 2012 saw Echo visit the Seychelles to take part in anti-piracy training with the Seychelles Coast Guard. The visit included a stop in the capital Victoria. On 16 August 2012 the ship returned to Devonport after almost a year and a half away. In this time she had been in the Middle and Far East, and had fired on a suspected Somali pirate vessel.

In July 2013 Echo was in the central Mediterranean surveying the approaches to the ports of Tripoli and Khoms on the coast of Libya to improve Admiralty charts of the area. She was looking for wrecks that might be hazards to shipping. In ten days she found the wrecks of one ocean liner, two merchant ships, one landing craft, two fishing vessels, two barges and two large sunken pontoons. She also found at least half a dozen lost shipping containers. The landing craft is believed to be the Libyan Navy Polnocny-class landing ship Ibn Qis, which was burnt out on exercise in 1978.

On 20 March 2014 Echo was in the Persian Gulf when redeployed to an area around 2,400 km (1,500 mi) south west of Perth, Western Australia, to join the search for the missing Malaysia Airlines Flight 370, in response to a request by the Australian authorities to the British Ministry of Defence. Prior to this, she was midway through an 18-month deployment "to improve charts used by seafarers throughout the world". According to the ship's programme, she was next to be conducting hydrographic surveying in the Gulf until her return to the UK later on in 2014.

As of January 2016, Echo was operating in UK waters on fishery protection duties while Mersey was deployed to the Caribbean. Echo departed Devonport on 4 November 2016 to relieve Enterprise on migrant patrol in the Mediterranean.

On 21 November 2018, the UK defence secretary announced Echo would deploy to the Black Sea in 2019 for a freedom of navigation manoeuvre in support of Ukraine. On 21 December, she was visited by Defence Secretary Gavin Williamson in the port of Odesa.

=== 2021–2022 ===
In May 2022, Echo was reported to have been reduced to low readiness/reserve status. Echo was decommissioned at Portsmouth Naval Base on 30 June 2022.

=== Final fate ===
Talks about using Echo as a Harbour Training Ship to replace HMS Bristol took place around 2024. As of 2026, the future of Echo was described as "uncertain" by Navy Lookout.
