= Erck Rickmers =

German businessman and politician

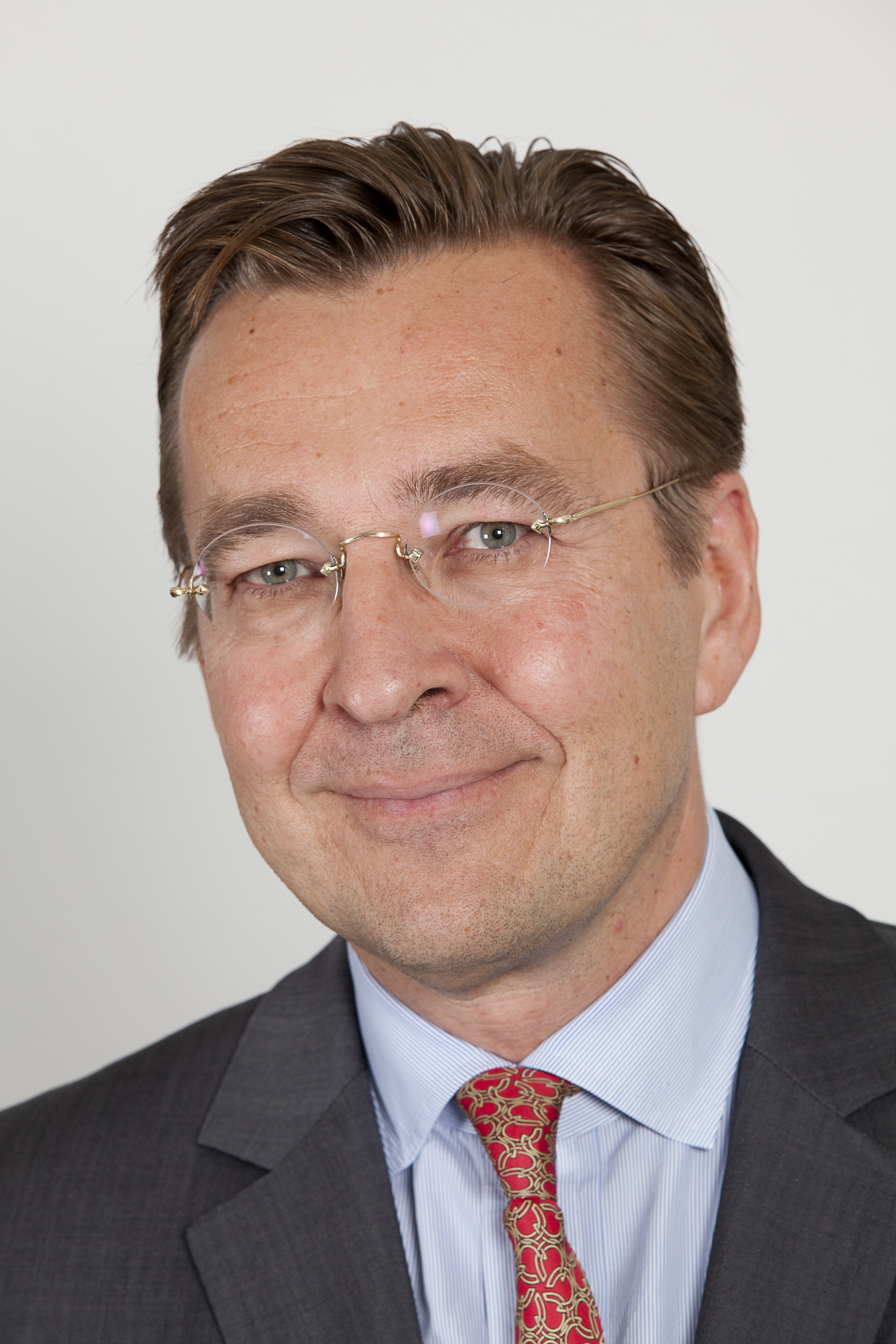
- Rickmers in 2016

Hamburg Parliament
- Preceded by: Carola Veit
- Succeeded by: Dirk Fischer

Personal details
- Born: 29 April 1964 (age 62) Bremerhaven, Germany
- Party: Social Democratic Party of Germany (SPD)
- Education: University of California
- Occupation: Businessman, politician

Erck Rickmers (born 29 April 1964 in Bremerhaven) is a German businessman and politician of the SPD (Social Democratic Party). He was an MP from 2011 to 2012.

== Early life and education ==
Erck Rickmers was born and grew up in Bremerhaven. He comes from the Rickmers family of entrepreneurs in Bremerhaven, whose founder, Rickmer Clasen Rickmers, founded the Rickmers shipyard in Bremerhaven in 1834. He did his schooling at the Stiftung Louisenlund in Schleswig-Holstein. After receiving his Abitur certificate and completing his military service with the German Air Force, he qualified as a shipping merchant following an apprenticeship with the Hamburg shipping company Ernst Russ. Among other positions, Rickmers subsequently worked as a ship broker at Harper Petersen & Co. in London. Rickmers attended a graduate program at the University of California, Santa Barbara, completing an M.A. degree in Religious Studies from 2015 to 2017.

== Politics ==
Rickmers is a member of the Social Democratic Party of Germany (SPD). At the 2011 Hamburg state election, he became a member of the Hamburg Parliament. As a member of the Hamburg Parliament, Rickmers chaired the committee on economics, innovation, and media and was a member of both the budget committee and the committee on public enterprises. In 2013, he reportedly left politics.

== Business career ==
In 1992, Rickmers co-founded the Hamburg-based investment company Nordcapital and became its sole shareholder in 1996. In 1998, he established the shipping company E.R. Schiffahrt. In 2008 Rickmers merged his assets under the umbrella of E.R. Capital Holding. Rickmers was selected as a chairman of the group in 2010.

Erck Rickmers founded THE NEW INSTITUTE in Hamburg in early 2020. The institute is an experimental initiative that aims to develop social imaginaries for future societies by combining academic rigor with innovative practice. Its stated objective is to inspire, promote, and implement societal change.

== Personal life ==
Rickmers is based in Hamburg, Germany. He is divorced from Cristina Sartori; they have five daughters.

== Philanthropy ==
In 2016 Rickmers established the International Foundation for the Humanities and Social Change. The foundation supports research centers at the University of California, Santa Barbara, and at the Ca' Foscari University of Venice, as well as the University of Cambridge and the Humboldt University of Berlin.

== Publications ==
- Erik Lindner: 175 Jahre Rickmers. Hoffmann und Campe 2009, ISBN 978-3455501117, S. 241–280.

== See also ==
- Hamburg Parliament
- Johannes Versmann

Preceded by Carola Veit	Member of Hamburg Parliament; 2012	Succeeded by Dirk Fischer
