= SS Claus Rickmers =

German-built cargo ship

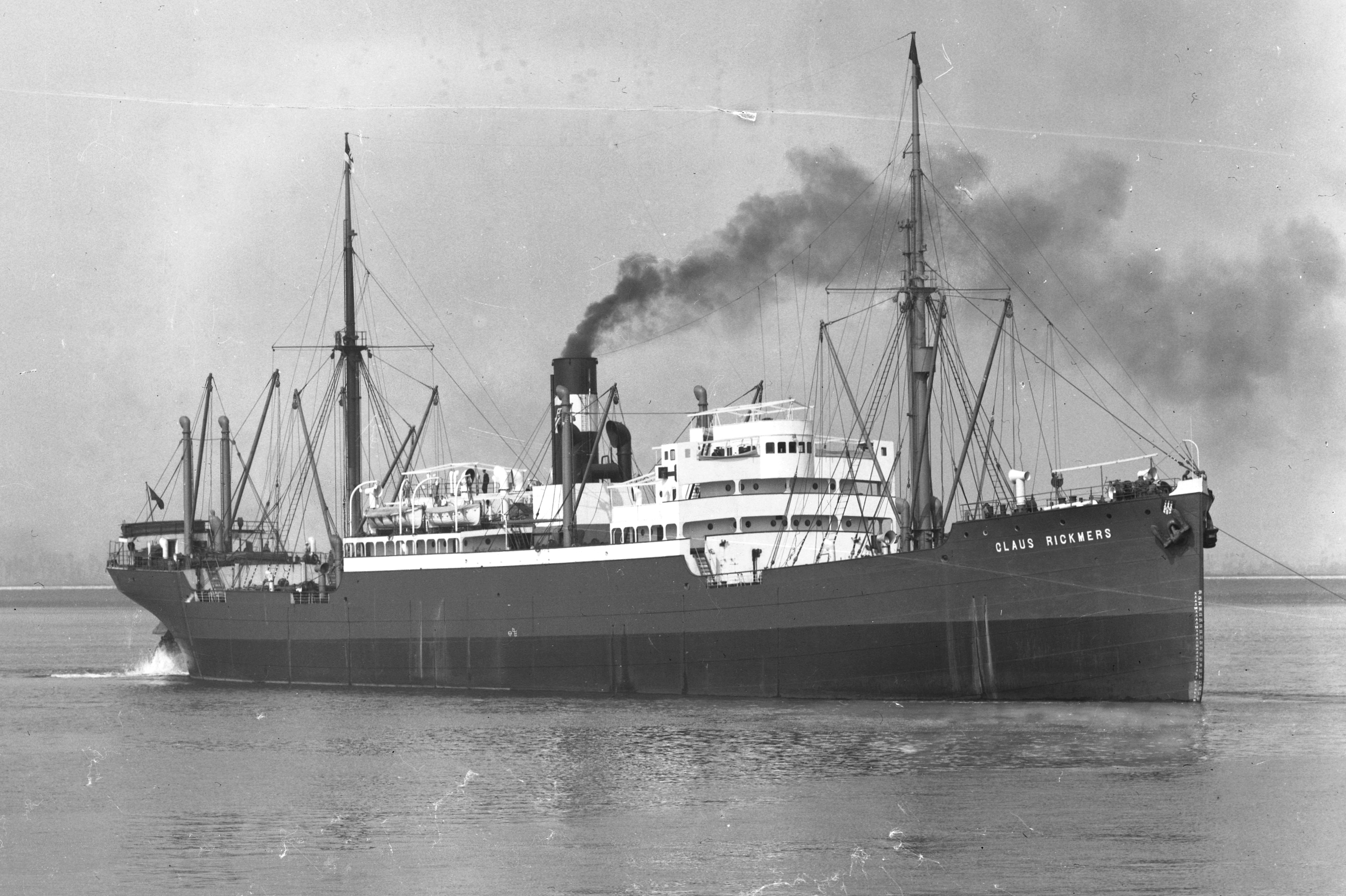
- Claus Rickmers, probably in the Scheldt

History
- Name: 1923: Claus Rickmers; 1947: Empire Carron; 1947: Andrian; 1949: San Nicolas
- Namesake: 1923: Claus Wilhelm Rickmers
- Owner: 1923: Rickmers Reederei; 1945: Ministry of War Transport; 1945: Ministry of Transport; 1947: SG Embiricos Ltd; 1949 Cía Navegación Yaviza
- Operator: 1940: Kriegsmarine
- Port of registry: 1923: (Weimar Republic) Hamburg; 1935: (Nazi Germany) Hamburg; 1945: (United Kingdom) not recorded; by 1948: (United Kingdom) London; 1949: Panama City
- Builder: Norddeutsche Werft, Geestemünde
- Yard number: 193
- Launched: 23 November 1923
- Completed: 22 February 1924
- Identification: 1924: code letters RDVL; by 1934: call sign DHEE; 1940: pennant number A 10; 1945: UK official number 181642; by 1948: call sign GCPB; by 1951: call sign HORD
- Fate: Scrapped in La Spezia, 1964

General characteristics
- Type: cargo steamship
- Tonnage: 5,165 GRT, 3,170 NRT, 8,040 DWT
- Length: 1923: 401.5 ft (122.4 m) registered; 1948: 402.2 ft (122.6 m) registered; 1957: 417 ft 9 in (127.33 m) overall
- Beam: 53.2 ft (16.2 m)
- Draught: 25 ft 3 1/2 in (7.71 m) summer
- Depth: 27.5 ft (8.4 m)
- Decks: 2
- Installed power: 1 × triple-expansion engine; 400 NHP
- Propulsion: 1 × screw
- Sensors & processing systems: as built: submarine signalling; by 1938: as above, plus wireless direction finding; by 1951: as above, plus echo sounding device and radar
- Notes: sister ship: R. C. Rickmers

SS Claus Rickmers was a cargo steamship that was launched in Germany in 1923 for Rickmers Reederei. In 1945 she was sunk by Allied bombing in Norway; raised; repaired; and seized as a prize ship. The UK Ministry of War Transport took ownership of her, and renamed her Empire Carron. In 1947 she was sold and renamed Andrian. In 1949 she was sold again, renamed San Nicolas, and registered in Panama. She was scrapped in Italy in 1964.

== Building and registration ==
In 1921, Rickmers Reederei took delivery of a new cargo steamship, R. C. Rickmers, from the Rickmers-owned Norddeutsche Werft in Geestemünde, Bremerhaven. In 1923, the same shipyard built a sister ship as yard number 193. She was launched on 23 November 1923 as Claus Rickmers, and completed on 22 February 1924.

Claus Rickmers' registered length was 401.5 ft (122.4 m); her beam was 53.2 ft (16.2 m); and her depth was 27.5 ft (8.4 m). Her tonnages were 5,165 GRT, 3,170 NRT, and 8,040 DWT. She had a single screw, driven by a three-cylinder triple-expansion engine built by AG "Weser" in Bremen that was rated at 400 NHP. As built, Claus Rickmers was equipped with submarine signalling. Rickmers Reederei registered her in Hamburg. Her code letters were RDVL.

== Claus Rickmers ==
On 13 September 1928, Claus Rickmers was involved in a collision with the Italian cargo ship Clara Camas at Glückstadt and was beached. By 1934, Claus Rickmers' call sign was DHEE, and this had superseded her code letters. By 1938, wireless direction finding had been added to her navigation equipment.

On 4 May 1940, the Kriegsmarine requisitioned Claus Rickmers as a troopship. Her pennant number was A 10. She was returned to her owners on 20 October 1940. On 26 June 1941, she was sunk at Ventspils in Latvia. She was refloated and repaired. On 21 October 1944 the German cargo ship Hohenhörn struck a mine off the Swedish islet of Stora Pölsan in the Kattegat, and sank in eight minutes. Claus Rickmers rescued her entire crew, and returned them to Germany.

On 9 January 1945, an Allied air raid on Lervik in Norway damaged Claus Rickmers. On 15 January 1945, a formation of sixteen Mosquito aircraft of the Banff Strike Wing, comprising aircraft from 143, 235, 248 and 333 Squadrons, Royal Air Force, led by Wing Commander Max Guedj, attacked the damaged Claus Rickmers; the flak ships Seehund and O B Rogge; and the R boat R 34. Claus Rickmers was towed to Bergen for repairs.

== Changes of owner and name ==
In May 1945, the Allies seized Claus Rickmers as a war prize, and passed her to the UK Ministry of War Transport. By 1946 she was renamed Empire Carron. Her repairs were completed in 1947. In 1947, SG Embiricos bought her, renamed her Andrian, and registered her in London. By 1948, her UK official number was 181642, her call sign was GCPB, and her registered length had been revised to 402.2 ft (122.6 m).

In 1949, Compañía Navegación Yaviza bought Andrian, renamed her San Nicolas, and registered her under the Panamanian flag of convenience. Her call sign was HORD. By 1951, an echo sounding device and radar had been added to her navigation equipment. By 1957, her length overall was 417 ft 9 in (127.33 m), and her summer draught was 25 ft 3 1/2 in (7.71 m).

In December 1964, San Nicolas arrived in La Spezia in Italy to be scrapped.

== Bibliography ==
- Jordan, Roger (1999). The World's Merchant Fleets, 1939. London: Chatham Publishing. ISBN 1-86176-023-X.
- Lloyd's Register of Shipping. Vol. II.–Steamers and Motor Vessels. London: Lloyd's Register of Shipping. 1922 – via Internet Archive.
- Lloyd's Register of Shipping. Vol. II.–Steamers and Motorships. London: Lloyd's Register of Shipping. 1924 – via Internet Archive.
- Lloyd's Register of Shipping (PDF). Vol. II.–Steamers and Motorships of 300 Tons Gross and Over. London: Lloyd's Register of Shipping. 1934 – via Southampton City Council.
- Lloyd's Register of Shipping (PDF). Vol. II.–Steamers and Motorships of 300 Tons Gross and Over. London: Lloyd's Register of Shipping. 1938 – via Southampton City Council.
- Lloyd's Register of Shipping. Vol. Steamers and Motorships of 300 Tons Gross and Over. London: Lloyd's Register of Shipping. 1946 – via Internet Archive.
- Lloyd's Register of Shipping. Vol. Steamers and Motorships of 300 Tons Gross and Over. London: Lloyd's Register of Shipping. 1947 – via Internet Archive.
- Mitchell, WH; Sawyer, LA (1995). The Empire Ships. London, New York, Hamburg, Hong Kong: Lloyd's of London Press Ltd. ISBN 1-85044-275-4.
- Register Book. Vol. M–Z. London: Lloyd's Register of Shipping. 1951 – via Internet Archive.
- Register Book. Vol. Register of Ships. London: Lloyd's Register of Shipping. 1957 – via Internet Archive.
