= Echo-class survey ship (2002) =

Multi-purpose hydrographic survey ships

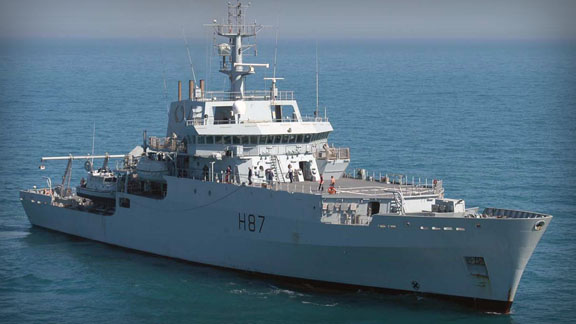
- HMS Echo, 2011

Class overview
- Builders: Appledore Shipbuilders, Bideford (Subcontracted from Vosper Thornycroft)
- Operators: Royal Navy Bangladesh Navy
- Built: 2000–2003
- In commission: 2003–2023
- Completed: 2
- Retired: 2, 1 was brought back and sold to Bangladesh

General characteristics
- Type: Hydrographic survey; Mine countermeasures (Note: Secondary role as a mine countermeasures command vessel. Capable of embarking a dedicated mine countermeasures team and supporting other MCM vessels.)
- Displacement: 3,740 t (3,680 long tons)
- Length: 90.6 m (297 ft 3 in)
- Beam: 16.8 m (55 ft 1 in)
- Draught: 5.5 m (18 ft 1 in)
- Propulsion: Diesel-electric; 3 × diesel generators (4.8 MW); 2 × 1.7 MW (2,279 hp) azimuth thrusters; 1 × 0.4 MW (536 hp) bow thruster
- Speed: 15 knots (28 km/h; 17 mph)
- Range: 9,300 nmi (17,200 km; 10,700 mi) at 12 kn (22 km/h; 14 mph)
- Endurance: 35 days
- Boats & landing craft carried: Survey motor boat
- Complement: 72
- Sensors & processing systems: Integrated survey system (Note: Side-scan sonar; Multi-beam echo sounder; Single-beam echo sounder; Undulating oceanographic profiler; Doppler current log; Sub-bottom profiler; Bottom sampling equipment)
- Armament: 2 × Oerlikon 20 mm cannons; 2 × Miniguns; 4 × General purpose machine guns

The Echo class was a class of multi-purpose hydrographic survey ships in commission with the Royal Navy. The ships were primarily tasked with conducting survey work in support of submarine and amphibious operations, however, the class also has a secondary role in mine countermeasures. The two vessels of the class were the most recent additions to the Royal Navy's Hydrographic Squadron. Each ship displaced approximately 3,700 tonnes, and was equipped with a state of the art suite of equipment. The lead ship of the class, HMS Echo, was retired in 2022 and her sister ship in 2023.

== Design ==
Echo and Enterprise were the first Royal Navy ships to be fitted with azimuth thrusters. Both azimuth thrusters and the bow thruster can be controlled through the integrated navigation system by a joystick providing high manoeuvrability. Complete control and monitoring for power generation and propulsion, together with all auxiliary plant systems, tank gauging and damage control functions is provided through the integrated platform management system (IPMS), accessible through workstations around the ship. The range of equipment carried includes the following:

- Multi beam echo sounder
- Single beam echo sounder
- Survey Planning and Processing Systems
- Side-scan sonar
- Oceanographic Probe and sensors
- Undulating Oceanographic Profiler
- Doppler Current Log
- Sub-bottom Profiler
- Bottom Sampling Equipment
- Survey motor boat fitted with multi-beam sonar and sidescan sonar

The vessels were armed. They carried a GAM-B01 20 mm cannon (a naval version of the Oerlikon 20 mm cannon), two miniguns and four General Purpose Machine Guns.

== Role ==
The vessels were designed to conduct survey tasks in support of submarines or amphibious operations. They provided almost real-time tailored environmental information, and also have a secondary role as a mine countermeasure tasking authority platform, for which they were capable of embarking a dedicated mine counter measures command team, and supporting other mine warfare vessels.

== Manning ==
The two ships followed the same type of crew rotation pattern as HMS Scott, in that two-thirds of their crew was needed to keep the ship operational, with the remaining one-third ashore. This allowed each ship to be available for deployment for up to 330 days a year.

The ship's crew consisted of 72 personnel, with 48 on board at any one time, working a cycle of 75 days on, 30 days off. The ships were able to accommodate 81 personnel if necessary. In support of this high availability, all accommodation and recreational facilities were designed for an unusual (in a warship) degree of comfort. All personnel shared double cabins with private facilities, except the captain and executive officer who both had single cabins.

== Ships in the class ==
Name	Pennant No.	Builder	Ordered	Launched	Date of Commission	Decommission	Status
Echo	H87	Appledore Shipbuilders, Bideford	19 June 2000	4 March 2002	7 March 2003	30 June 2022	Awaiting disposal
Enterprise	H88	Appledore Shipbuilders, Bideford	19 June 2000	2 May 2002	17 October 2003	30 March 2023	Sold to Bangladesh Navy

|- |HMS Egeria (2) |19 October 2001
