= Baidu Maps =

Desktop and mobile web mapping service by Baidu

- Screenshot of the SimCity-like style that Baidu Maps offers for the city of Shanghai, China.
- Native name: 百度地图
- Website type: Web mapping
- Available in: Chinese
- Owner: Baidu
- Website: Baidu Maps
- Commercial: Yes
- Registration: None
- Launched: 2005; 21 years ago
- Current status: Active

Baidu Maps is a desktop and mobile web mapping service application and technology provided by Baidu, offering satellite imagery, street maps, street view (which is called "Panorama" – zh:百度全景) and indoor view perspectives, as well as functions such as a route planner for traveling by foot, car, or with public transport. Android and iOS applications are available.

Baidu Maps is available only in the Chinese language and, before 2016, it offered only maps of mainland China, Hong Kong, Macau and Taiwan, with the rest of the world appearing unexplored. Currently, Baidu Maps also offers maps of various other countries. It was reported that more than 150 countries would be supported by the end of 2016. Baidu uses map data supplied by NavInfo, MapKing, Here, LocalKing and OpenStreetMap.

In 2016, it was reported that Baidu Maps had over 348 million monthly active users.

== Countries and territories supported ==
=== Within Mainland China ===
- Mainland China

=== Outside Mainland China ===
- Afghanistan
- Argentina
- Australia
- Belgium
- Bolivia
- Brazil
- Brunei
- Cambodia
- Chile
- Colombia
- Cuba
- Ecuador
- Egypt
- Finland
- France
- French Guiana
- Germany
- Guyana
- Hong Kong
- India
- Indonesia
- Israel
- Italy
- Japan
- Laos
- Macau
- Malaysia
- Maldives
- Mauritius
- Mexico
- Morocco
- Myanmar
- Nepal
- Netherlands
- New Zealand
- Nicaragua
- Panama
- Philippines
- Portugal
- Russia
- Serbia
- Singapore
- Solomon Islands
- South Africa
- South Korea
- Spain
- Sri Lanka
- Suriname
- Switzerland
- Taiwan
- Thailand
- Ukraine
- United Arab Emirates
- United States
- Uruguay
- Venezuela
- Vietnam

== History ==
On September 30, 2005, Baidu Maps was released.

In 2010, Baidu added a detailed three-dimensional view for select cities, which has been described as being SimCity-like. The feature is licensed from the digital mapping service Edushi. Cities covered include Beijing, Shanghai, Guangzhou and Shenzhen. In November 2011, Baidu launched satellite imagery for the Greater China region with better resolution than Google Maps. City-level only includes Beijing, Shanghai, Guangzhou, Shenzhen, Hong Kong, Macao and other major cities.

On September 3, 2012, at its annual Baidu World event, Baidu revealed 360-degree digital imagery for select buildings.

On August 21, 2013, Baidu Maps launched the Baidu Panoramic Map and announced the upgrade of its location-based services business. According to Silicon Valley Power, Shen Li, head of Baidu's LBS business unit, states that Baidu Maps' users have exceeded 200 million.

== Coordinate system ==
Screenshot of Baidu Maps with WGS 84, GCJ-02 and BD-09 markers

Baidu Maps uses a variant of web Mercator projection for slicing map data into tiles, with distances expressed in degrees. It is associated with an underlying latitude-longitude reference. The reference uses the BD-09 coordinate system, which adds further obfuscation to the already obscure national standard in China, GCJ-02 (which in turn is defined in terms of the de facto standard around the world, WGS 84). Baidu alleges that adopting BD-09 "protects users' privacy".

The Baidu Maps API documentation specifies that "real" (WGS 84) GPS coordinates must be converted via a coordinate conversion interface. An HTTP interface, JavaScript API, Android SDK, and iOS SDK are available.

The JavaScript coordinate conversion API is demonstrated online by Baidu, but without any reverse (to GCJ-02) conversion capabilities. Open source implementations in R and various other languages exist, implemented in a manner much like the reverse GCJ-02 algorithm.

BD-09's latitude-longitude coordinates are derived by scrambling a polar version of GCJ-02 coordinates and adding a fixed offset:

from cmath import polar, rect
from math import sin, cos, pi
# Represent coordinates with complex numbers for simplicity
coords = complex

# baidu assumes x/real: lon; y/imag: lat here.
def gcj_bd(gcj: coords) -> coords:
    r, θ = polar(gcj)
    r += 2e-5 * sin(gcj.imag * pi * 3000 / 180)
    θ += 3e-6 * cos(gcj.real * pi * 3000 / 180)
    return rect(r, θ) + (0.0065 + 0.006j)

== Street view service ==
The street view service of Baidu Maps was first launched on August 21, 2013. This is a list of cities supported as of March 11, 2015:

Provincial level division	City
Beijing	Beijing
Shanghai	Shanghai
Tianjin	Tianjin
Chongqing	Chongqing
Liaoning	Shenyang, Liaoyang, Dalian, Fushun, Panjin, Jinzhou, Chaoyang, Dandong, Yingkou
Jilin	Changchun, Jilin City, Tonghua, Yanbian Korean Autonomous Prefecture, Songyuan, Baicheng
Heilongjiang	Harbin, Daqing, Qiqihar, Mudanjiang, Jiamusi
Shanxi	Taiyuan, Jinzhong, Shuozhou, Xinzhou, Lüliang, Yangquan, Linfen, Changzhi, Yuncheng
Shandong	Jinan, Qingdao, Tai'an, Weifang, Rizhao, Weihai, Jining, Yantai, Dongying, Binzhou, Liaocheng
Anhui	Hefei, Wuhu, Huangshan City, Lu'an
Jiangsu	Nanjing, Suzhou, Wuxi, Yangzhou, Changzhou, Xuzhou, Lianyungang, Yancheng, Huai'an, Nantong, Zhenjiang, Suqian
Zhejiang	Hangzhou, Jiaxing, Ningbo, Huzhou, Shaoxing, Zhoushan, Lishui, Taizhou, Quzhou
Hebei	Shijiazhuang, Baoding, Langfang, Qinhuangdao, Chengde, Tangshan, Zhangjiakou
Henan	Zhengzhou, Kaifeng, Anyang, Xinxiang, Luoyang, Shangqiu, Xuchang, Pingdingshan, Zhoukou, Zhumadian, Xinyang, Jiaozuo
Hubei	Xiangyang, Jingmen, Jingzhou, Shiyan, Suizhou, Huangshi
Hunan	Changsha, Zhangjiajie, Xiangxi Tujia and Miao Autonomous Prefecture
Jiangxi	Nanchang, Jiujiang, Jingdezhen, Ji'an, Shangrao
Fujian	Fuzhou, Xiamen, Quanzhou, Putian, Zhangzhou, Nanping
Guangdong	Guangzhou, Shenzhen, Dongguan, Qingyuan, Jiangmen, Zhongshan, Zhuhai, Zhanjiang, Foshan, Shantou, Shanwei, Jieyang
Guangxi	Liuzhou, Guilin, Beihai, Qinzhou, Fangchenggang, Yulin, Guangxi, Guigang, Chongzuo, Baise
Hainan	Haikou, Sanya, Danzhou, Wenchang, Tunchang County, Qionghai, Wanning, Lingshui Li Autonomous County, Wuzhishan City, Dongfang, Hainan, Ding'an County, Chengmai County, Lingao County, Changjiang Li Autonomous County, Ledong Li Autonomous County, Qiongzhong Li and Miao Autonomous County, Baoting Li and Miao Autonomous County
Inner Mongolia	Hohhot, Hulunbuir, Ordos City, Baotou, Hinggan League, Chifeng, Tongliao
Ningxia	Yinchuan, Wuzhong, Zhongwei
Gansu	Lanzhou, Jiuquan, Zhangye, Jiayuguan City, Qingyang, Pingliang, Tianshui, Wuwei
Qinghai	Xining, Golmud, Yushu Tibetan Autonomous Prefecture, Haibei Tibetan Autonomous Prefecture, Hainan Tibetan Autonomous Prefecture
Shaanxi	Xi'an, Yulin, Baoji, Yan'an, Xianyang, Hanzhong
Yunnan	Kunming
Tibet Autonomous Region	Lhasa (prefecture-level city), Shigatse, Nagqu Prefecture, Lhoka (Shannan) Prefecture
Xinjiang	Aksu, Kashgar, Turpan, Hotan Prefecture
Hong Kong	Hong Kong
Macau	Macau

== Blocking ==
=== India ===
In June 2020, the Indian Government blocked Baidu Maps as well as 58 other Chinese apps, citing national security concerns during the clashes between the People's Liberation Army Ground Force and the Indian Army in the Galwan Valley.
