= GCJ =

GCJ may refer to:

- Google Code Jam, programming competition hosted by Google
- GCJ-02, a geodetic datum used in China
- General Council of the Judiciary, the constitutional body governing the Judiciary of Spain
- GNU Compiler for Java
- Grand Central Airport, in Midrand, South Africa
- Knight Grand Commander of the Order of Saint Joachim
