= Jens Rasmussen =

Jens Rasmussen may refer to:

- Jens Rasmussen (human factors expert), Danish professor at Risø
- Jens Rasmussen (speedway rider) from Denmark (born 1959)
- Jens Eilstrup Rasmussen, Danish inventor
- Jens Elmegård Rasmussen (1944–2013), Danish associate professor of Indo-European Studies
- Jens Erik Carl Rasmussen, (1841-1893), Danish painter
- Jens Sebastian Rasmussen, Filipino footballer
