= Restrictions on geographic data in South Korea =

Restrictions on using GPS in South Korea

South Korean geographic data and information is subject to several regulations which severely restrict its reuse. The South Korean government defends the restrictions on the grounds of national security. A number of international critics argue that it constitutes a form of protectionism and a trade barrier.

South Korea remains one of very few countries in the world where international services like Google Maps face service problems.

However, as the South Korean government conditionally approved the export of high-precision maps at a scale of 1:5000 on 27 February 2026, Google Maps service is expected to be available in South Korea normally within the next six months.

== Legal situation ==
South Korean geographic data is subject to several restrictions due to laws such as the Geospatial Information Management Act (also known as the Act on Construction and Management of Spatial Information). Article 16, Paragraph 1 of that law prohibits state-led survey data from crossing the physical boundaries of Korea. Another related legislation is the Article 26 of the Security Regulations on National Spatial Information that states that the aerial photographs containing the national security and military facilities should not be open to the public.

== Consequences ==
The legal restrictions have led to poorer performance of international platforms such as Google Maps or Apple Maps in South Korea. In 2016 and in 2023, Google and Apple respectively were denied mapping data, which therefore cannot offer real time or precise directions for their apps, impacting various services (including games like Pokémon Go, and more basic functionality such as driving or walking directions). The South Korean government has repeatedly justified this policy on the basis of national security, citing the threat of North Korea and specific security concerns such as the danger of unblurred satellite imagery of domestic military facilities, although a number of observers have also noted that the current situation is a form of protectionism that benefits local Korean competitors of international services (such as Naver, Kakao, or Daum, which provide their own map services).

Korean law and implementation has been called a trade barrier. United States trade representatives suggested that it infringes on the KORUS FTA between the countries, which in theory does not allow for discrimination between domestic and imported digital products. On the other hand, it has been argued that the extra burden forced on domestic companies which have to implement censorship can reduce the quality of services offered and therefore their competitiveness.

These legal concerns have led to self-censorship in South Korean media, prompting arguments that it hurts the ability of Koreans to judge the veracity of claims of North Korean propaganda regarding the South Korean military.

The argument about national security has been criticized due to the fact that comparison between internationally available satellite imagery and South-Korean-government approved censored one can actually facilitate identification of military objects that presumably should be hidden, making them more, not less, vulnerable. Further, some of the objects classified as military facilities and censored have little realistic military value, such as military-affiliated golf courses.

== Conditional permission to export geographic data in 2026 ==
On 27 February 2026, the South Korean government has granted conditional permission to export high-precision geographic data at a scale of 1:5000.

The council, composed of South Korean government ministries and civilian representatives, stated, "After deliberation, we decided to grant export permission subject to strict security conditions", explaining that the approval was based on compliance with conditions such as video security processing, coordinate display restrictions, and the use of domestic servers. Furthermore, the South Korean government plans to confirm compliance with these conditions before exporting data, and to suspend or revoke the permit if persistent or serious violations are confirmed.

== See also ==
- Internet censorship in South Korea
- Restrictions on geographic data in China
