= Tom Stocky =

American computer scientist and technology executive

- Education: Massachusetts Institute of Technology
- Occupations: SVP, Lab & Data Platform, insitro
- Known for: Facebook Search, Google App Engine, Google Flights

Tom Stocky is an American computer scientist and technology executive. He is senior vice president of lab & data platform at insitro, a drug discovery startup. He was previously vice president of Search at Facebook.

Stocky was a director of product management at Google. He was part of the founding team for Google App Engine, which laid the foundation for the Google Cloud Platform.

In 2011, Stocky joined Facebook to become VP of Search. He grew Facebook Search to more than 2 billion searches per day. He and Lars Rasmussen led the team who built Facebook Graph Search, a semantic search engine for the social network, and Stocky then led the development of keyword search over the trillions of posts on Facebook. Stocky and Rasmussen were included on Business Insider's list of The 100 Biggest Stars In Silicon Valley. Stocky also started Facebook's language technology team, which developed an AI-powered translation engine for Facebook posts that completes 4.5 billion automatic translations per day across 44 languages.

While at Facebook, Stocky was one of its first male executives to take the full four-month paternity leave they offered. He wrote a post about his experience that went viral, and Mark Zuckerberg later took a two-month paternity leave. Stocky spoke about the importance of companies providing equal parental leave to men and women, and Facebook expanded its policy to give all employees four months of leave, regardless of gender or location.

Stocky led the learning platform team at the Chan Zuckerberg Initiative. He also served on the board of Teach For America.

In 2020, Stocky joined Denali Therapeutics as a technology fellow. In 2021, he joined insitro as vice president of product. Stocky serves on the board of directors of the Banner Alzheimer's Foundation, the scientific advisory board of Denali Therapeutics, and the scientific review board of the Alzheimer's Drug Discovery Foundation.
