= Wikiloc =

Website for sharing GPS trails and waypoints

- Screenshot
- Website type: Crowd-gathered information
- Available in: Spanish, Galician, Basque, Catalan, Danish, Dutch, English, French, German, Italian, Portuguese, Russian, Simplified Chinese, Traditional Chinese and Turkish
- Creators: Jordi L. Ramot & voluntary collaborators
- Website: www.wikiloc.com
- Commercial: Yes
- Registration: Optional (required to download files)
- Launched: 2006
- Content license: Proprietary

Wikiloc is a website, launched in 2006, containing GPS trails and waypoints that members have uploaded. This mashup shows the routes in frames showing Google Maps (with the possibility to show the layers of World Relief Map (maps-for-free.com), OpenStreetMap, the related OpenCycleMap, USGS Imagery Topo Base Map and USGS Topo Base Map). The service is also available in Google Earth. There are mobile apps for Android and iPhone. The product has more than 11M members, is offered in many languages and has more than 37.9M tracks of dozens of activities (hiking, cycling, sailing, horseback riding, driving, paragliding, and so on) in many countries and territories. Wikiloc began as a worldwide online reference for hiking. Additionally, photographs on Wikiloc enabled automated content analysis to characterize the landscape in the Ebro Delta Natural Park, Spain.

Wikiloc does not pay its contributors. It charges users to download trails and waypoints from the website directly to a Garmin or mobile device (but GPX downloads are free). It also prohibits bulk downloads or re-hosting of the data.

== Technology ==
Wikiloc runs on Linux, with a PostgreSQL database manager with PostGIS for geography support, Apache software, Hibernate, GEOS, GDAL, PROJ.4, and with some Python for preprocess and maintenance.

== Awards ==
Wikiloc has won the following prizes:

- Winner of the Changemakers / National Geographic 2009 Geotourism Challenge
- Winner of the Google Maps mashup contest in 2006
- Winner of the Initiative/Company award of the Spanish Geographic Society in 2013

== See also ==
- AllTrails
- Google Fit
- Apple Health
- MSN Health & Fitness
- Runkeeper
- Strava
