= Senghor on the Rocks =

Senghor on the Rocks is an online geo-novel. It was first published under a creative commons license in 2008 by the Austrian writer Christoph Benda (Text, Geodata), Johannes Krtek (Design) and Florian Ledermann (Programming, Production) as "the first full-length novel consistently illustrated with Google Maps"

== Synopsis ==
The story of Senghor on the Rocks begins in Dakar, Senegal on 20 December 2001. On this very day people in Dakar were celebrating the national soccer team's qualification for the Football World Cup, as the breaking news about the death of Léopold Sédar Senghor, the famous poet and the republic's first president, hit the country. Starting at this point the novel follows Austrian camera assistant Martin "Chi" Tschirner, who flew to Dakar for a promotional video job, through a "fast paced adventure that starts as a job, develops into an involuntary journey and culminates in a reflection about the possibilities and limits of cross-cultural understanding", as Florian Ledermann put it in an interview with The Sydney Morning Herald.

== Background ==
As the author of Senghor on the Rocks puts it in a publication on the project, one of the novel's main topics is the "'cross cultural dialogue', a minefield of clichés, projections, cultural attributions and prejudices". In this case an "omniscient narrator seemed almost impossible as trying to describe the cultural 'other' from an assumedly objective point of view always comes with the peril of producing exoticisms or hegemonial projections". The whole novel therefore is "strictly told in a first-person perspective stressing the bias of a subjective view instead of trying to avoid it. At the same time, the main character pretends to tell his story not only from his very own point of view but also at the very moment it is taking place". These considerations resulted in the novel's strict spatial and temporal linearity. With this narrative structure Senghor on the Rocks was well suited for an adoption as an online "geo-novel" being presented together with animated maps.

== Implementation ==
The project aims to provide a new, continuous, dramatic experience to the user. For the implementation of Senghor on the Rocks the Google Maps API was enhanced with additional methods for page transitions. These transitions are intended to reflect the "subjective, searching and sometimes confused perspective of the story". In addition an animated, rotatable arrow was introduced to point out locations on the map. Compared to the pushpin needles and markers normally used in Google Maps an arrow adds a semantical openness to the representation of the maps, as it may be referring to an exact point, an area of varying radius, a viewing direction or a distinct object on the map like a building.

The developers of Senghor on the Rocks refer to an extended and modified approach to the microformats paradigm. Hence, all metadata, including map positions, zoom levels, routes, and arrow positions is stored in the main HTML file inside appropriate HTML elements alongside the text. The result is a HTML document that contains the whole novel in regular HTML which can be printed out as such. The book-like presentation and all mapping features are accomplished by a Style sheet and script that are loaded at initialisation.

== Design ==
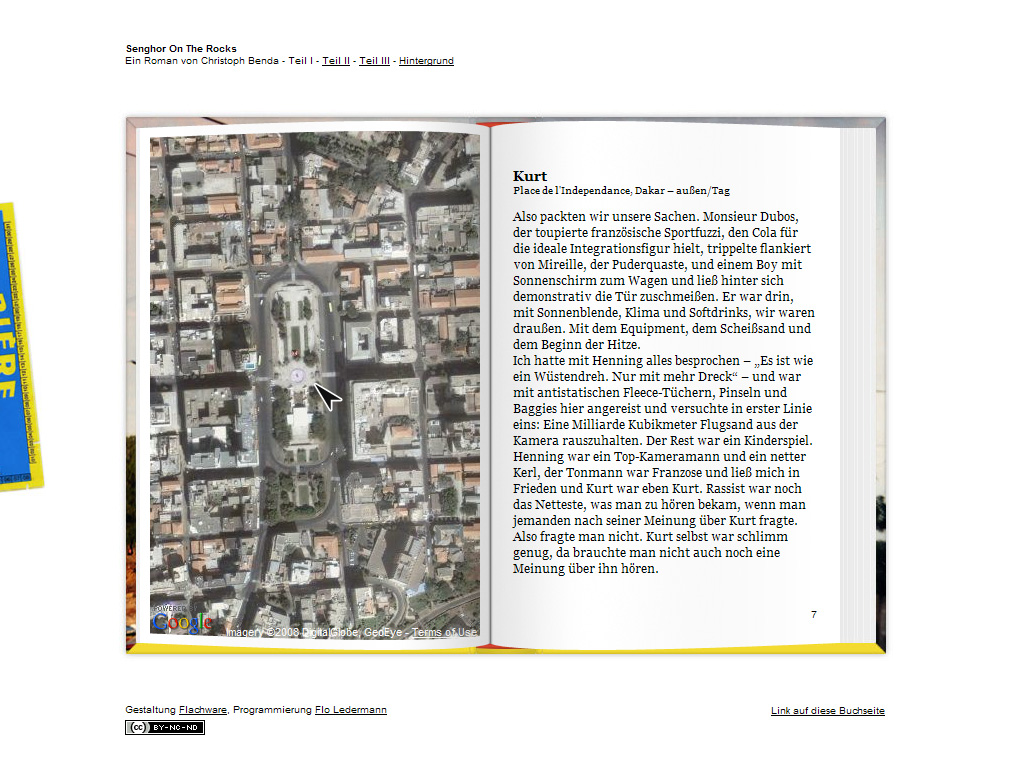
Screenshot of the "book-a-like" user interface of Senghor on the Rocks

For Senghor on the Rocks a book metaphor was used to design a user interface providing functionalities users/ readers are already familiar with. Once "opened" every page of text in the virtual book is accompanied by a satellite view of the current location of the story. "As with a physical book, readers can judge the position in the novel by looking at the block of pages to the left and right of the current page. A virtual bookmark is automatically inserted when the reader leaves the page, to bring her back to that page with a single click on the next visit." The covers that have been designed for the three parts of the novel advertise their content and serve as the main entry points into the story. The collages for the covers – composed mainly from material recorded at original locations – focus on the book's content and by that obfuscate the technical aspects of the project. On the top level, these "covers" act as an iconographic representation of the project that frequently was quoted in the form of screen shots on blogs and other media.

This "book-a-like" interface results in constraints imposed on the interactive functionality usually expected in a web browser, e.g. zoom levels in the map pages are fixed to the value set by the producers of Senghor on the Rocks and cannot be changed by users. This has been interpreted as an intentional infringement of well established rules of online content presentation. Even though, the design contributed to the circulation and publicity the project has found and was highly valued by publications such as PAGE and Die Welt.

== Reception ==
Articles in the online editions of some of Germany's biggest newspapers and weeklys such as Der Spiegel, Stern and Bild, international TV-features and numerous blog entries yielded continuous publicity for the project since its launch. 2010 Senghor in the Rocks was chosen for inclusion in the Electronic Literature Organization's Electronic Literature Collection Vol. 2. Annika Richterich/ University of Siegen scientifically deals with the project in her PhD thesis using Senghor on the Rocks alongside Charles Cumming's The 21 Steps, and the websites F.A.Z. Romanatlas, and Landvermesser as a showcase for what she entitles „Geomediale Literatur". In other publications the project is referred to as "locative narrative" and "geo-graphic novel". Reactions in press and blogs have ranged from enthusiasm – "... this is very interesting, innovative, and down-right cool!", "...hugely impressive..." – to criticism: "Kokolores".
