= Google Maps pin =

Graphic icon

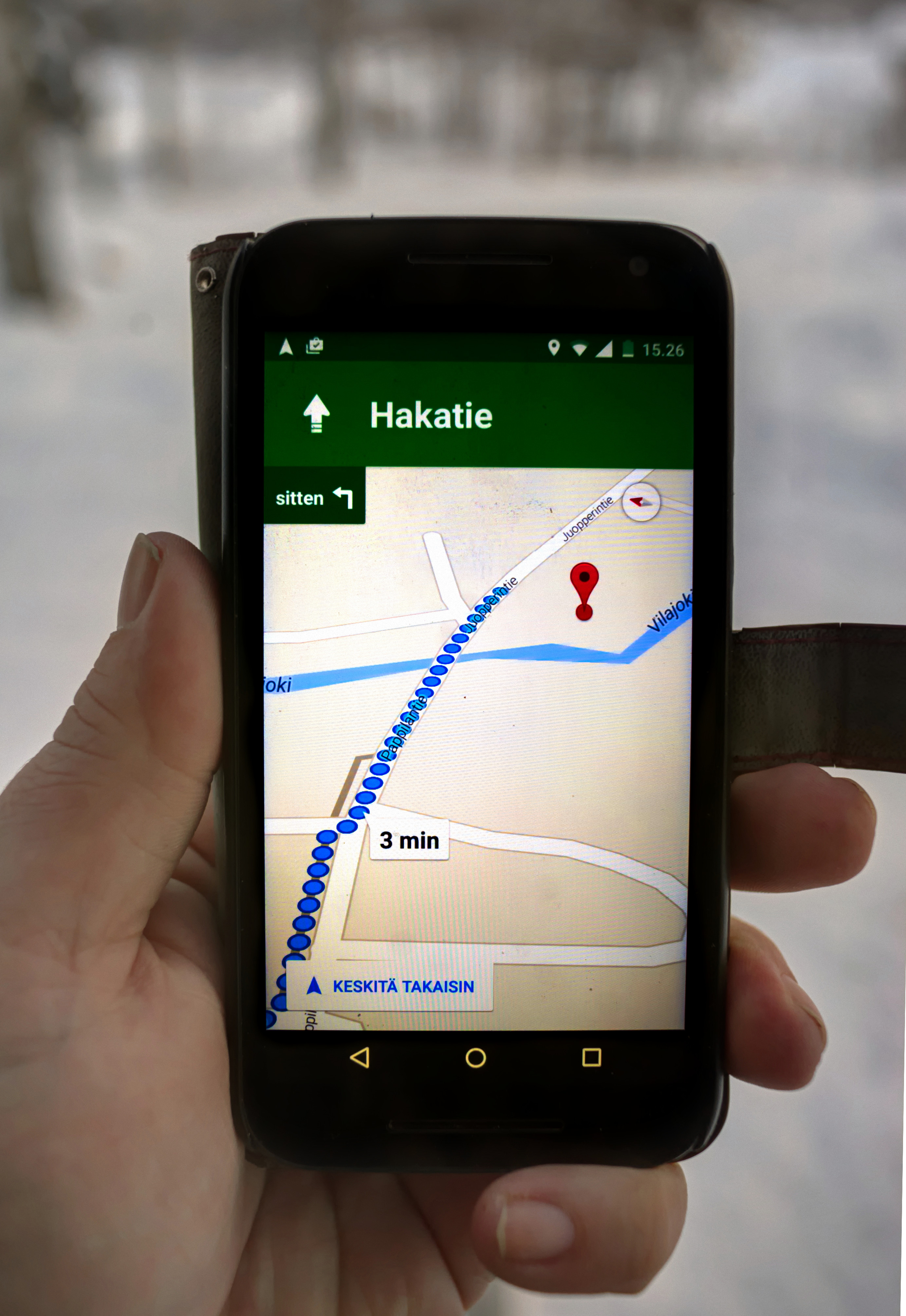
The Google Maps pin showing a location in the Google Maps app

Google Maps logo as of 2026

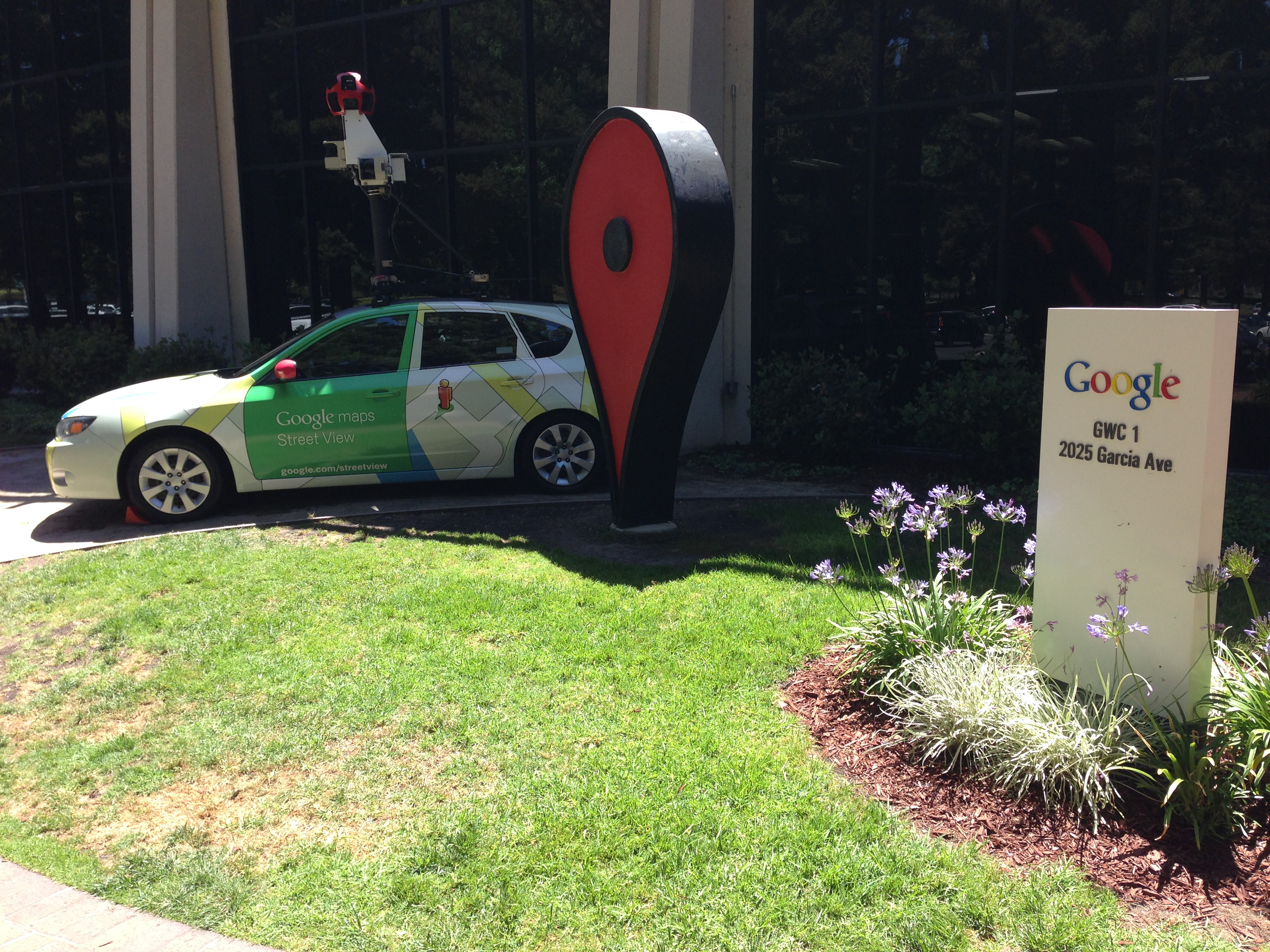
The pin in Google headquarters, next to a Google Maps Street View vehicle

The Google Maps pin is the inverted-drop-shaped icon that marks locations in Google Maps. The pin is protected under a U.S. design patent as "teardrop-shaped marker icon including a shadow". Google has used the pin in various graphics, games, and promotional materials.

The pin, sometimes referred to as "the marker", has been widely co-opted by other companies, organizations, and individuals for their own marketing efforts, artwork, and activism. In both digital and physical representations, the pin is often used to symbolize mapping software and the technology industry as a whole.

The Google Maps pin has been called "a product of pure function that has evolved into a cultural phenomenon" and "a solution that would take on a life of its own, recognizable enough to stick up for itself in the art and design projects of others". "Looking like a hot air balloon in flight, this marker has landed squarely in the middle of our visual culture".

In 2014, the Museum of Modern Art acquired a physical representation of the Google Maps pin for its permanent collection. In 2020, the pin icon became the official logo of Google Maps.

== History ==
Jens Eilstrup Rasmussen designed the Google Maps pin prior to the launch of Google Maps in 2005. He wanted the pin to accurately mark a point on a map without obscuring the location. The main body of the pin is circular at the top, but tapers into a point at the bottom, forming an inverted teardrop shape. A drop shadow extends from the point at the bottom, giving the pin a three-dimensional look.

In the original version of Google Maps, the pin was displayed with the letters "A" through "J" when there was more than one search result. In later versions, the pin was shown with a black dot inside to mark a single location. In 2011, Google released a minor redesign of the pin that changed the black outline of the pin to a dark red for a softer look.

== Use by Google ==
Google has used the pin in online and traditional print marketing campaigns for Google Maps. The pin is displayed as part of the icon for the Google Maps mobile application, on a stylized map along with an uppercase letter "G" for "Google."

=== Promotional materials ===
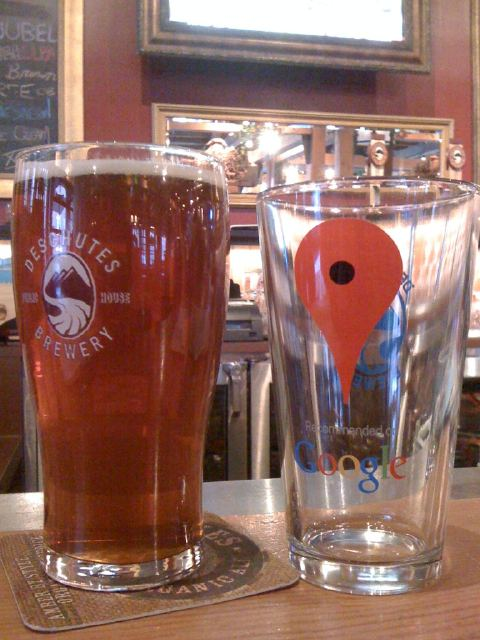
Deschutes Brewery, 2011

The pin has been used on promotional objects like beer glasses, stickers, and coffee cup sleeves in various marketing campaigns. Google has also designed and sold T-shirts that display a Google Maps pin along with the words "I am here".

=== Favorite Places campaign ===
In 2009, Google launched the Favorite Places marketing campaign. 100,000 local businesses received a store-window decal portraying the Google Maps pin on a map, with the words "We're a Favorite Place on Google." The stickers included a QR code which could be scanned by customers to bring up the business's Place Page in order to leave an online review.

Celebrities including Yo-Yo Ma, Diane von Furstenberg, Al Gore, and Tony Hawk, shared their favorite locations around the world, such as restaurants, bakeries, and design shops. At 30 of these locations, Google erected an 800-pound pin, each personalized with unique designs based on input from the celebrity who chose that location.

=== Hello World campaign ===
In 2013, Google commissioned New York-based graphic designer Matt Delbridge for the Hello World ad campaign. Many of the illustrations incorporated the Google Maps pin along with images associated with specific locations around the world.

=== Other uses by Google ===
In 2010, Google created online cards that used several pins to spell out "Happy Holidays". In 2011, Google doubled the Google Maps pin to create a heart for a Map Your Valentine holiday feature.

In 2011, Google partnered with Susan G. Komen for the Cure to create a campaign called Pink Pin in New York City. Businesses and consumers were asked to pin their locations on the Pink Pin website, share personal stories related to breast cancer awareness, and donate to the cause.

In 2014, Google launched "Smarty Pins", a browser-based geographical trivia game that features the Google Maps pin. Players receive clues about locations around the world, which they then identify by placing the Google Maps pin on a map. Players start the game with 1,000 points, and lose points equivalent to the number of miles they place their pins from the correct location. Bonus points can be gained by answering the trivia questions quickly.

== Use by other organizations ==
The Google Maps API allows developers to create customized maps, for which they can create their own markers.

=== Inclusion in logos ===
Although the Google Maps pin is protected under a U.S. design patent, other organizations have used it as a component of their own logos.

The Labour Party of Malta used an image closely resembling the Google Maps pin as their logo in the 2014 European Parliament election campaign. A Google spokesperson contacted by The Times of Malta would not comment on whether the logo was a breach of Google's intellectual property rights, though a copyright lawyer interviewed for the article explained that the similarity could result in legal repercussions.

In 2010, Facebook filed a trademark application for a design including a marker similar to the Google Maps pin above a representation of a rectangular map, but later abandoned the application.

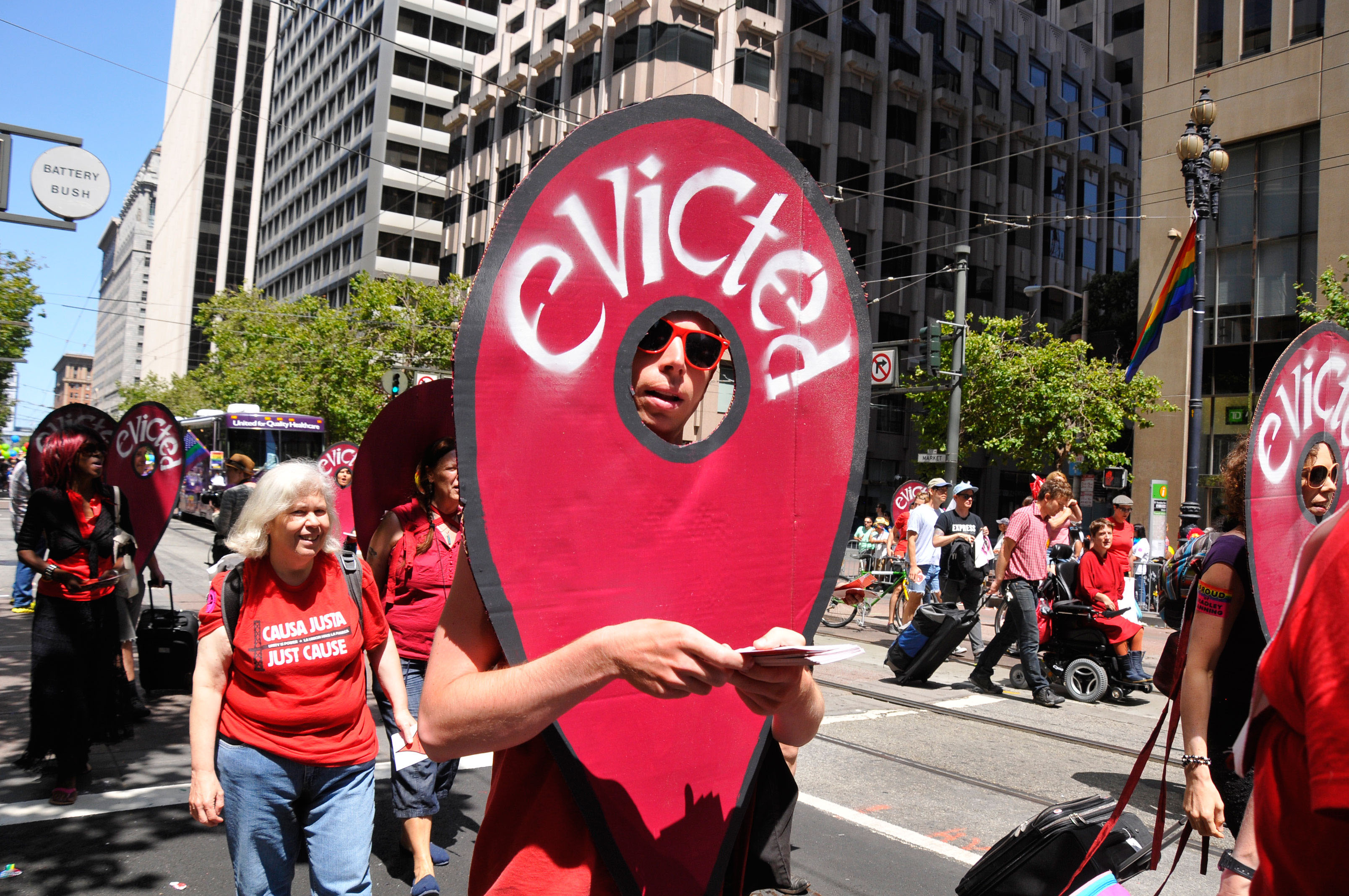
Pride San Francisco, 2013

=== Political use ===
When Metahaven, an Amsterdam-based studio for design and research, was charged with drafting concepts for WikiLeaks' new visual identity, they considered integrating the Google Maps pin, inverted. This suggested a dripping leak, and the impossibility of pinpointing the source.

In 2013, demonstrators in San Francisco carried signs shaped like the Google Maps pin, bearing the word "evicted" to protest tech-driven evictions in the city.

== In popular culture ==
The Google Maps pin has evolved beyond its original intended use to become quasi-iconic in popular culture. Rob Walker cites the pin as an example of dedigitization, "something from the digital world crossing over to the physical". The pin has been used in various mediums not just to pinpoint locations, but to represent abstracts like mapping technology or even the technology industry as a whole.

=== Sculpture ===
Berlin-based conceptual artist Aram Bartholl is known for creating works that examine the relationship between the digital and physical world, using popular imagery from software and games. Beginning in 2006, Bartholl has created a public art installation called Map. Bartholl installs a large physical representation of the Google Maps pin in the exact location that Google Maps identifies as the center of a city. Locations thus far have included Taipei, Berlin, Arles, and Tallinn. Each sculpture remains in place for about three months, usually coinciding with a local art festival or exhibit. The series was designed to raise viewers' awareness of the increasing overlap between the virtual and the physical, and to highlight mapping services' influence on perceptions of location. Bartholl's physical representations of the Google Maps pin urges viewers to reevaluate the information given by digitized maps, the meaning of the "center" of a city, the politicization of boundaries, and other issues related to maps and the digital versus the physical world.

Before the Royal College of Art's 150th-anniversary exhibition in 2007, student Robert Sollis e-mailed Google requesting a temporary Google Maps marker be placed over the college's temporary site in Kensington Gardens. Upon receiving only an auto-reply, Sollis created his own physical marker, which he hoped would appear in satellite images. Sollis constructed the Google Carpet of individual carpet tiles, each 185mm^{2}, which corresponds to one pixel of Google's satellite imagery.

In July 2013, as part of a public art event in Horsens, Denmark, the Icelandic-Danish design duo ÖRNDUVALD installed a mural called Pin at 55°51′42″N 9°50′47″E. The 9-square-meter piece, "a giant and shimmering reinterpretation of the Google Maps pin", was made from 10,078 circular discs mounted to plywood. Amanda Kooser of cnet wrote, "if Liberace had been on the Google Maps design team, all the pins would look like this," while Jamie Condliffe stated in Gizmodo, "The Google Maps pin is iconic: bold and simple, yet incredibly memorable. And emblazoned on the side of a Danish building in twinkling metallic form, it might just be the geekiest mural ever."

In June 2012, Taiwanese designer Shu-Chun Hsiao created Project Google Birdhouse by hanging pin-shaped birdhouses around Taipei. He stated, "Google Map had created a remarkable landmark icon, showing the sites on its street views. To search for a landmark with online Google map, we can scroll to zoom from the satellite, soon we'll be able to wander on streets, virtually. Birds, have the most real experience of google map. Birds can fly through the city, through streets. A birdhouse becomes their destination as google map does. The iconic symbol will become a navigating landmark for the flying birds." Jaime Derriger wrote, "The icon that we have all come to know and love which graces our Google maps to let us know where we are, or where we need to go, has become ubiquitous. Designer Shu-Chun Hsiao realized this and created the Google Birdhouse Project, an ongoing project to give birds destinations of their own, just like Google maps does for humans".

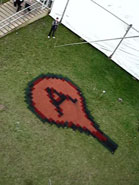
Google Carpet
Robert Sollis 2007

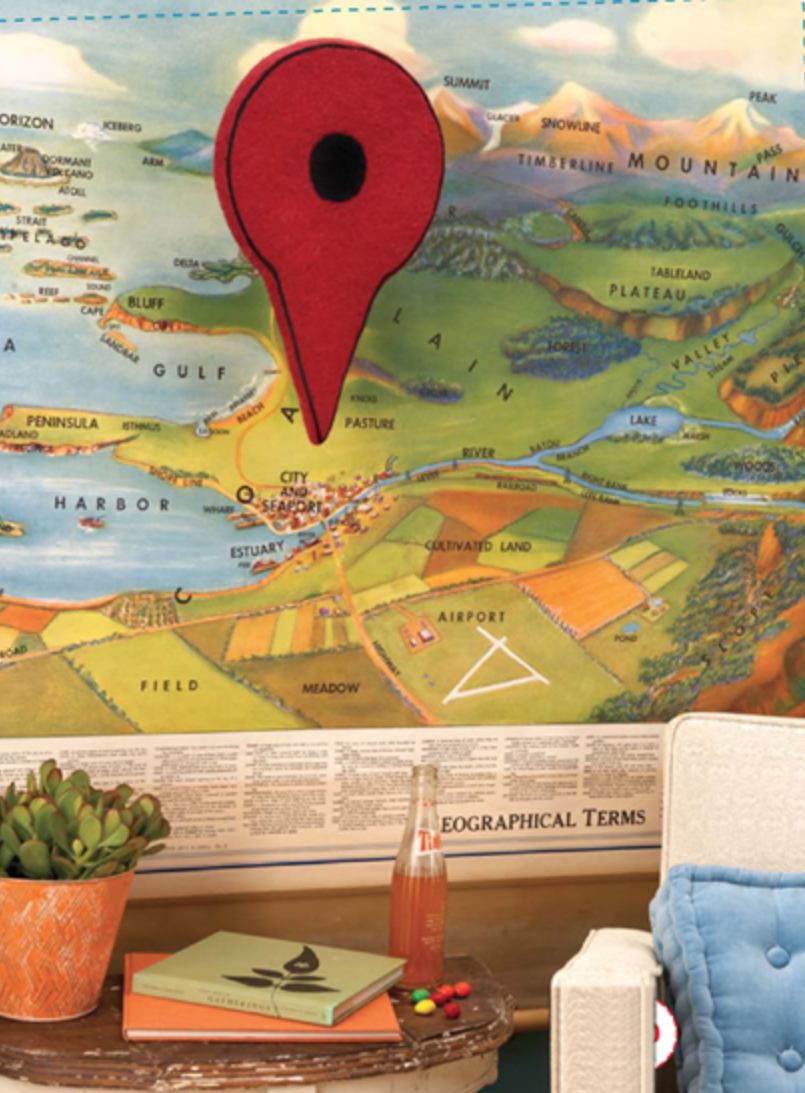
Felt Google Maps Pin, 2010

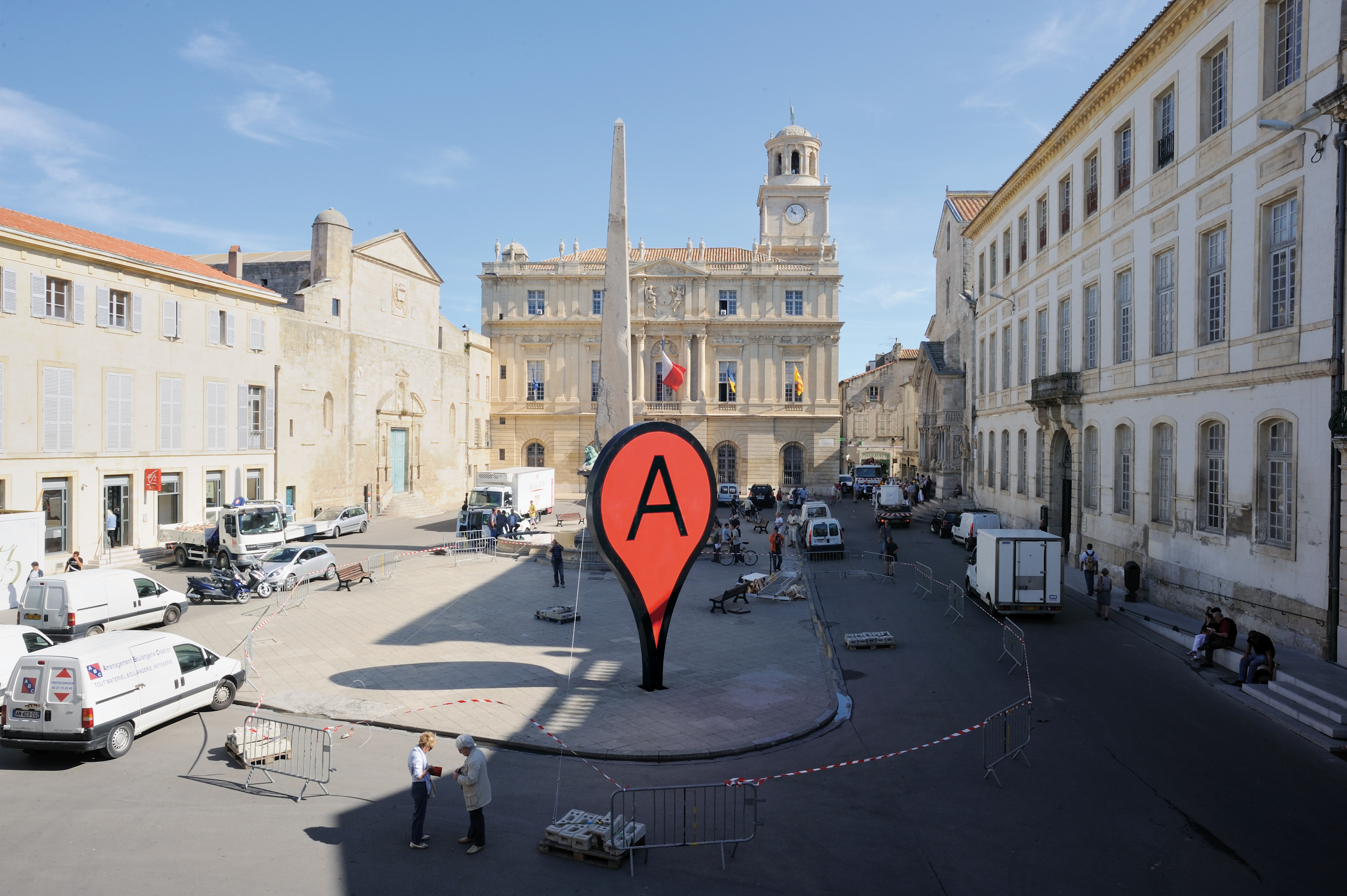
Map, 2011

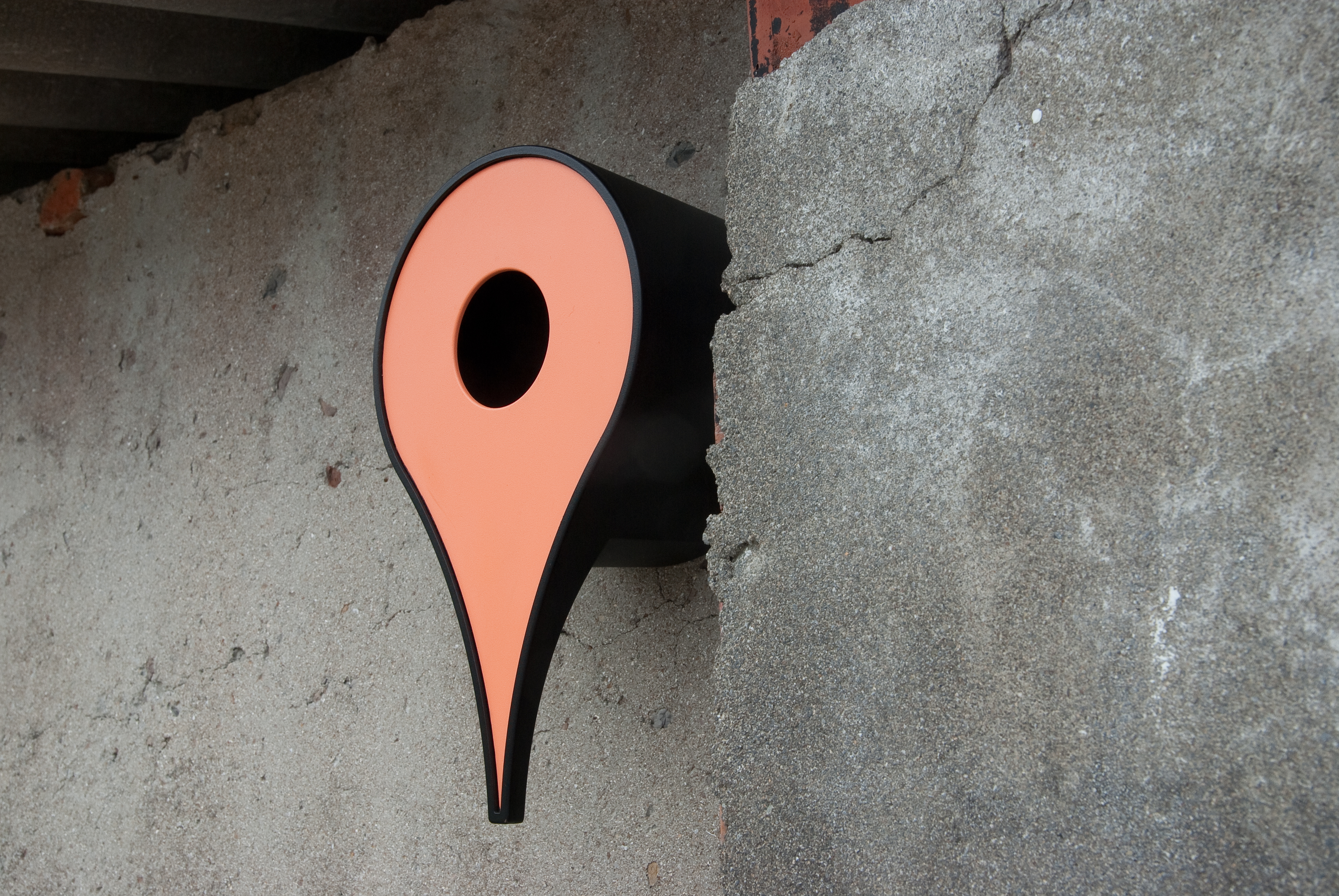
Project Google Birdhouse, 2012

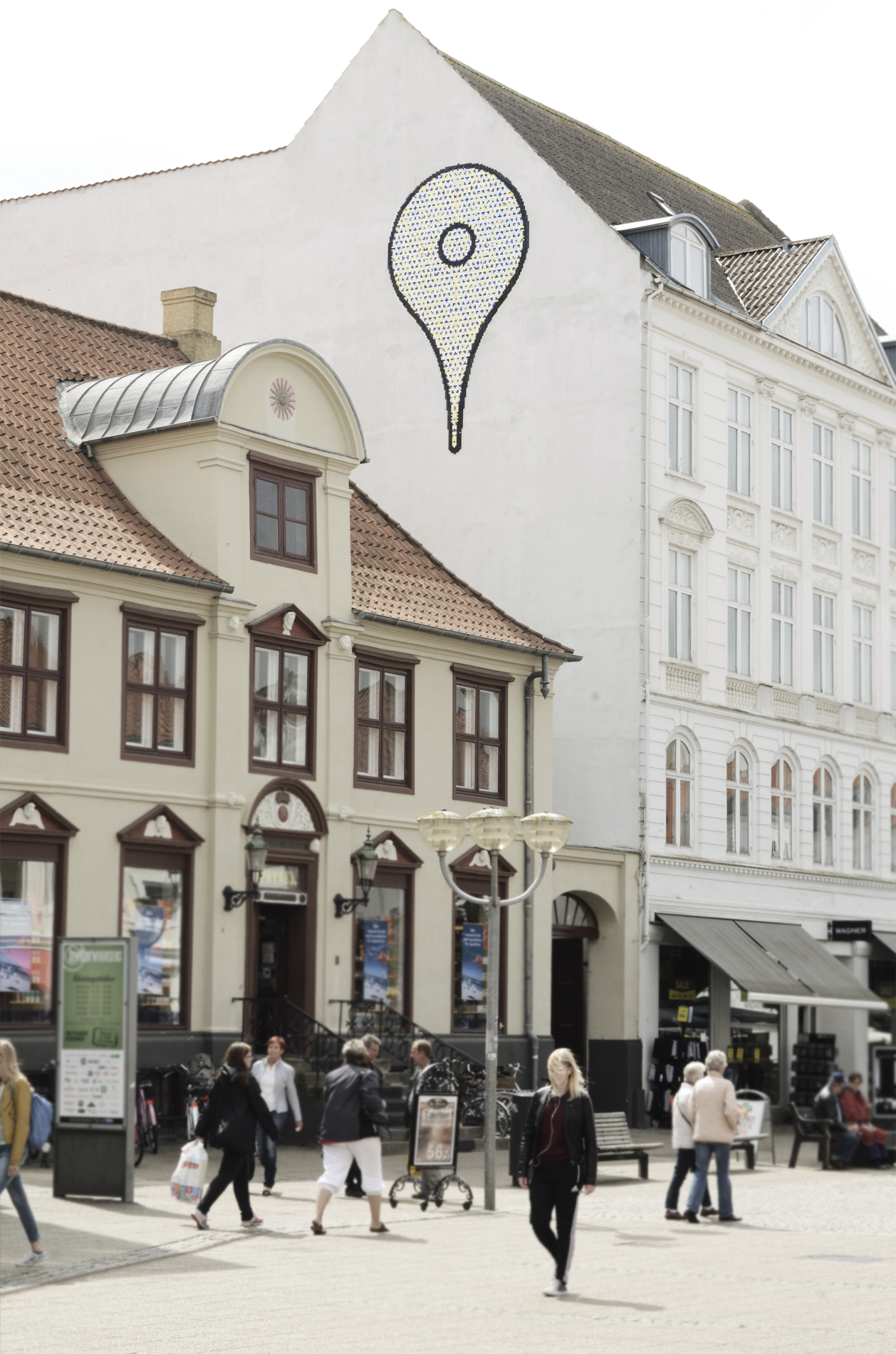
Pin, 2013
