= Lars Rasmussen (software developer) =

Danish software developer (born 1968)

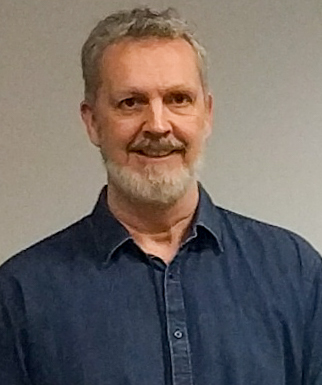
- Rasmussen in 2016
- Born: 1968 (age 57–58)
- Education: Aarhus University (BSc); University of Edinburgh (MSc); University of California, Berkeley (PhD)
- Known for: Google Maps, Google Wave
- Relatives: Jens Rasmussen (brother)
- Awards: Pearcey Award (2010)
- Scientific career
- Fields: Computer science
- Workplaces: Google, Facebook
- Doctoral advisor: Alistair Sinclair

Lars Eilstrup Rasmussen (born 1968) is a Danish computer scientist, technology executive, and the co-founder of Google Maps. He was later the director of engineering for Facebook in London.

In early 2003, Lars and his brother Jens co-founded a mapping-related startup, Where 2 Technologies, which was acquired by Google in October 2004. Rasmussen became the head of the Google Maps team and worked at Google until joining Facebook in late 2010.

== Qualifications ==
In 1990, Rasmussen graduated from the University of Aarhus with a degree in Computer Science and Mathematics. He gained his MSc in Computer Systems Engineering from the University of Edinburgh in 1992.

Rasmussen began his PhD, working with Mark Jerrum and Alistair Sinclair in the Laboratory for Foundations of Computer Science at Edinburgh, then moved, with Sinclair, to Berkeley, California, USA.

He received his PhD from the University of California, Berkeley in 1998, for his thesis "On Approximating the Permanent and Other #P-Complete Problems".

== Where 2 Technologies and Google Maps ==
In 2003, Lars and his brother, Jens, with Australians Noel Gordon and Stephen Ma, co-founded Where 2 Technologies, a mapping-related start-up in Sydney, Australia. This company was bought by Google in October 2004, to create Google Maps. The four of them were subsequently employed by Google in the engineering team at the company's Australian office in Sydney. Lars and Jens are also the originators of the Google Wave project.

== Facebook ==
On 29 October 2010, Rasmussen announced that he had left Google, and was moving to San Francisco to work for Facebook. At Facebook he was, among other things, the engineering director for the Facebook Graph Search project which is a semantic search engine for the social network. In 2013 he and Tom Stocky were listed as number 79 in The 100 Biggest Stars In Silicon Valley by Business Insider. Rasmussen had been working in the Facebook London office.

== Weav Music (2015–2023) ==
On 27 April 2015 Rasmussen announced his departure from Facebook to co-found a music start-up, Weav Music Inc, with his partner Elomida Visviki. Weav’s adaptive-music running app, Weav Run, launched on iOS in early 2017; in August 2017 the company announced initial licensing partnerships with Universal Music Group, Sony Music Entertainment and Warner Music Group to expand its catalogue of tempo-adaptive tracks. In December 2019 Weav raised a US$5 million Series A led by King River Capital, with participation from Peloton and other investors. In June 2020 the company introduced personalised audio workouts with voice coaching that adapted in real time to a runner’s pace and location.

On 23 August 2023 the Weav Run app issued a final update enabling full data export and advising users that the app would stop functioning in the coming days, effectively discontinuing the service. A 2023 interview with a Weav engineer cited difficulties persuading record labels to permit adaptive remixes of recorded songs as a key challenge to scaling the model. Rasmussen has since moved to Athens and works as an angel investor and early-stage advisor.

== Awards ==
On 19 October 2010, Lars and Jens Rasmussen were awarded the Pearcey Award for NSW ICT Entrepreneurs of the Year.

In 2011, the Rasmussen brothers received the national Benson Entrepreneur Award (also known as the CSIRO Tony Benson Entrepreneur Award).

In 2020, Rasmussen was named the recipient of the Green Oaks, Libertyville, Mundelein, Vernon Hills Chamber of Commerce’s Stephanie Smith-Howard Volunteer Heart Award.

In 2024, Rasmussen was recognised as a UC Berkeley EECS Distinguished Alumni Award recipient.

== Investments ==
Rasmussen has made personal investments in a number of technology startups including Canva, an online design tool; and Posse, a point of interest-based recommendation service.
