= Local search engine optimisation =

Practice of increasing online visibility

Local search engine optimization (local SEO) is similar to (national) SEO in that it is also a process affecting the visibility of a website or a web page in a web search engine's unpaid results (known as its SERP, search engine results page) often referred to as "natural", "organic", or "earned" results. In general, the higher ranked on the search results page and more frequently a site appears in the search results list, the more visitors it will receive from the search engine's users; these visitors can then be converted into customers. Local SEO, however, differs in that it is focused on optimizing a business's online presence so that its web pages will be displayed by search engines when users enter local searches for its products or services. Ranking for local search involves a similar process to general SEO but includes some specific elements to rank a business for local search.

For example, local SEO is all about 'optimizing' your online presence to attract more business from relevant local searches. The majority of these searches take place on Google, Yahoo, Bing, Yandex, Baidu and other search engines but for better optimization in your local area you should also use sites like Yelp, Angie's List, LinkedIn, Local business directories, social media channels and others.

== Origins ==
The origin of local SEO can be traced back to 2003-2005 when search engines tried to provide people with results in their vicinity as well as additional information such as opening times of a store, listings in maps, etc.

Local SEO has evolved over the years to provide a targeted online marketing approach that allows local businesses to appear based on a range of local search signals, providing a distinct difference from broader organic SEO which prioritises relevance of search over a distance of searcher.

== Local search results ==
Local searches trigger search engines to display two types of results on the Search engine results page: local organic results and the 'Local Pack'. The local organic results include web pages related to the search query with local relevance. These often include directories such as Yelp, Yellow Pages, Facebook, etc. The Local Pack displays businesses that have signed up with Google and taken ownership of their 'Google My Business' (GMB) listing.

The information displayed in the GMB listing and hence in the Local Pack can come from different sources:

- The owner of the business. This information can include opening/closing times, description of products or services, etc.
- Information is taken from the business's website
- User-provided information such as reviews or uploaded photos
- Information from other sources such as social profiles etc.
- Structured Data taken from Wikidata and Wikipedia. Data from these sources is part of the information that appears in Google's Knowledge Panel in the search results.

Depending on the searches, Google can show relevant local results in Google Maps or Search. This is true on both mobile and desktop devices.

== Google Maps ==
Google has added a new Q&A features to Google Maps allowing users to submit questions to owners and allowing these to respond. This Q&A feature is tied to the associated Google My Business account.

== Google Business Profile ==
Google Business Profile (GBP), formerly Google My Business (GMB), is a free tool that allows businesses to create and manage their Google Business listing. These listings must represent a physical location that a customer can visit. A Google Business listing appears when customers search for businesses either on Google Maps or in Google SERPs. The accuracy of these listings is a local ranking factor.

== Ranking factors ==
Major search engines have algorithms that determine which local businesses rank in local search. Primary factors that impact a local business's chance of appearing in local search include proper categorization in business directories, a business's name, address, and phone number (NAP) being crawlable on the website, and citations (mentions of the local business on other relevant websites like a chamber of commerce website).

In 2016, a study using statistical analysis assessed how and why businesses ranked in the Local Packs and identified positive correlations between local rankings and 100+ ranking factors. Although the study cannot replicate Google's algorithm, it did deliver several interesting findings:

- Backlinks showed the most important correlation (and also Google's Toolbar PageRank, suggesting that older links are an advantage because the Toolbar has not been updated in a long time).
- Sites with more content (hence more keywords) tended to fare better (as expected).
- Reviews on GMB also were found to strongly correlate with high rankings.
- Other GMB factors, like the presence of photos and having a verified GMB page with opening hours, showed a positive correlation (with ranking) albeit not as important as reviews.
- The quality of citations such as a low number of duplicates, consistency and also a fair number of citations, mattered for a business to show in Local Packs. However, within the pack, citations did not influence their ranking: "citations appear to be foundational but not a competitive advantage."
- The authors were instead surprised that geotargeting elements (city & state) in the title of the GMB landing page did not have any impact on GMB rankings. Hence the authors suggest using such elements only if it makes sense for usability reasons.
- The presence of a keyword in the business name was found to be one of the most important factors (explaining the high incidence of spam in the Local Pack).
- Schema structured data is a ranking factor. The addition of the 'LocalBusiness' markup will enable you to display relevant information about your business to Google. This includes opening hours, address, founder, parent company information and much more.
- The number of reviews and overall star rating correlates with higher rankings in the Google map pack results.

== Local ranking according to Google ==
Prominence, relevance, and distance are the three main criteria Google claims to use in its algorithms to show results that best match a user's query.

- Prominence reflects how well-known is a place in the offline world. An important museum or store, for example, will be given more prominence. Google also uses information obtained on the web to assess prominence such as review counts, links, articles.
- Relevance refers to Google's algorithms attempt to surface the listings that best match the user's query.
- Distance refers to Google's attempt to return those listings that are the closest the location terms used in a user's query. If no location term is used then "Google will calculate distance based on what's known about their location".

== Local ranking: 2017 survey from 40 local experts ==
According to a group of local SEO experts who took part in a survey, links and reviews are more important than ever to rank locally.

== "Near me" queries ==
As a result of both Google as well as Apple offering "near me" as an option to users, some authors report on how Google Trends shows very significant increases in "near me" queries. The same authors also report that the factors correlating the most with Local Pack ranking for "near me" queries include the presence of the "searched city and state in backlinks' anchor text" as well as the use of the " 'near me' in internal link anchor text"

== Possum update ==
An important update to Google's local algorithm, rolled out on the 1st of September 2016. Summary of the update on local search results:

- Businesses based outside city physical limits showed a significant increase in ranking in the Google Local Pack
- A more restrictive filter is in place. Before the update, Google filtered listings linking to the same website and using the same phone number. After the update, listings get filtered if they have the same address and same categories though they belong to different businesses. So, if several dentists share the same address, Google will only show one of them.

== Hawk update ==
As previously explained (see above), the Possum update led similar listings, within the same building, or even located on the same street, to get filtered. As a result, only one listing "with greater organic ranking and stronger relevance to the keyword" would be shown. After the Hawk update on 22 August 2017, this filtering seems to apply only to listings located within the same building or close by (e.g. 50 feet), but not to listings located further away (e.g.325 feet away).

== Fake reviews ==
As previously explained (see above), reviews are deemed to be an important ranking factor. Joy Hawkins, a Google Top Contributor and local SEO expert, highlights the problems due to fake reviews:

- Lack of an appropriate process for business owners to report fake reviews on competitors' sites. GMB support will not consider requests about businesses other than if they come from the business owners themselves. So if a competitor nearby has been collecting fake reviews, the only way to bring this to the attention of GMB is via the Google My Business Forum.
- Unlike Yelp, Google does not show a label warning users of abnormal review behavior for those businesses that buy reviews or that receive unnatural numbers of negative reviews because of media attention.
- Current Google algorithms do not identify unnatural review patterns. Abnormal review patterns often do not need human gauging and should be easily identified by algorithms. As a result, both fake listings and rogue reviewer profiles should be suspended.

=== Review management ===
The important factors for local search visibility include maintaining accurate and up-to-date business information and actively managing customer reviews. Google official guidance claims that 'Positive reviews and helpful replies can help your business stand out.' Review quantity, quality and the frequency of receiving fresh reviews correlate with local pack rankings and businesses are encouraged to implement the ethical review generation strategies while responding to all incoming reviews.

== See also ==
- Local search (optimization)
