= Geographic information systems in China =

Geographic Information Systems (GIS) are an important component of business, healthcare, security, government, trade, media, transportation, and tourism operations in China. GIS software plays a key role in how Chinese companies analyze and manage business operations.

== History ==
Geographic information systems (GIS) first became widely available in the 1980s and 1990s, when the only source of geographic data for China was paper maps. Several universities undertook the task of digitizing this information so researchers could use it.

The two earliest projects were conducted by The Australian Consortium for the Asian Spatial Information and Analysis Network (ACASIAN) at Griffith University and the China Data Center at the University of Michigan at Ann Arbor. ACASIAN specialized in spatial coverage while the China Data Center included GIS coverage in their mission to provide Chinese statistical and census data.

High-quality GIS data is produced in China by both government organizations and private companies. China's National Spatial Data Infrastructure Project uses the WGS84 standard. The partial timeline is:

- In 1991, China's first color Map Editing and Publication System, MapCAD.
- In 1995, China's first National Advanced GIS Software, Computer based GIS, MapGIS.
- In 2005, The fourth generation of large-scale distributed structure GIS, MapGIS 7.0
- In 2009, China's GIS new era—MapGIS K9.

In the early 1980s, China began studies for the establishment of its Geographic Names Information System (地名信息系统) and Geographic Names Information System Research Laboratory, and the establishment of the National Atlas of Geographical Names database research.

== Education ==
The China Association for Geographic Information System (simplified Chinese: 中国地理信息产业协会; traditional Chinese: 中國地理信息產業協會; pinyin: zhōng guó dì lǐ xìn xī chǎn yè xié huì), Peking University and other institutes sponsored the first "Innovation and Development, 2006 College GIS Forum" in Beijing. More than 300 experts attended the forum. Sessions involved China's GIS research in multi-disciplinary fields, personnel training, and technology. China has now more than 500 institutions of higher learning training GIS-related professionals, of which more than 200 universities and colleges have established a GIS lab.

== Industry ==
The GIS industry in China is worth 400 billion yuan per annum as of November 2007. More than 300,000 people were involved in either building or using these systems, according to Zondy Cyber Group president Wu Xincai, who is also the president of the China Association for Geographic Information System. Almost 20,000 enterprises are estimated to have engaged in the industry. The biggest vendor of GIS in China is Zondy Cyber Group, followed by SuperMap. Around 2,000 of these have GIS as a core discipline or function. The industry's rapid expansion is attributed to China's economic development, which has led to an increase in capital input, from both government and businesses. Between 2001 and 2005, the Ministry of Information Industry allocated more than 20 million yuan to fund the development and application of GIS. GIS has been used in land survey, mineral exploitation, water conservancy and environmental protection. It also has applications in power generation, mapping, telecommunication, and the management of public administration and public services.

== Notable persons ==
Chen Shupeng (1920–2008) is considered the founder of remote sensing and GIS in China. Chen started the State Key Laboratory of Resources and Environmental Information System (LREIS) in 1987.

== Institutions ==
Major institutions include:

- National Geographic Information System (国家基础地理信息中心)
- National Fundamental Geographic Information System
- National Geomatics Center of China
- State Bureau of Surveying and Mapping
- Institute of Soil Sciences, The Chinese Academy of Sciences
- The Data Sharing Network of Earth System Science
- SuperMap is a stand-alone GIS program and data provider. They have several large contracts with the Chinese government and are one of the few sources for 1:500 scale map data which they offer for a limited number of cities.
- MapWorld provides 1:10,000 and 1:25,000 scale data on a range of topics from administrative boundaries to facilities management. They provide datum and projection information and prepare data in either ESRI or MapInfo formats.
- Beijing Creation Science & Technology Development specializes in personalized data sets at any scale. They also prepare and process satellite images.
- State Key Laboratory of Resources and Environmental Information System (LREIS)
- Laboratory of Remote Sensing and Geospatial Science
- China University of Geosciences

== See also ==
- BeiDou Navigation Satellite System is used for GIS data gathering
- Canada Geographic Information System
- China Historical Geographic Information System
- Geographic information system
- Geoinformatics
- Historical geographic information system
- Information science
- National Historical Geographic Information System
- Restrictions on geographic data in China
