= Emilio Vavarella =

Italian artist (born 1989)

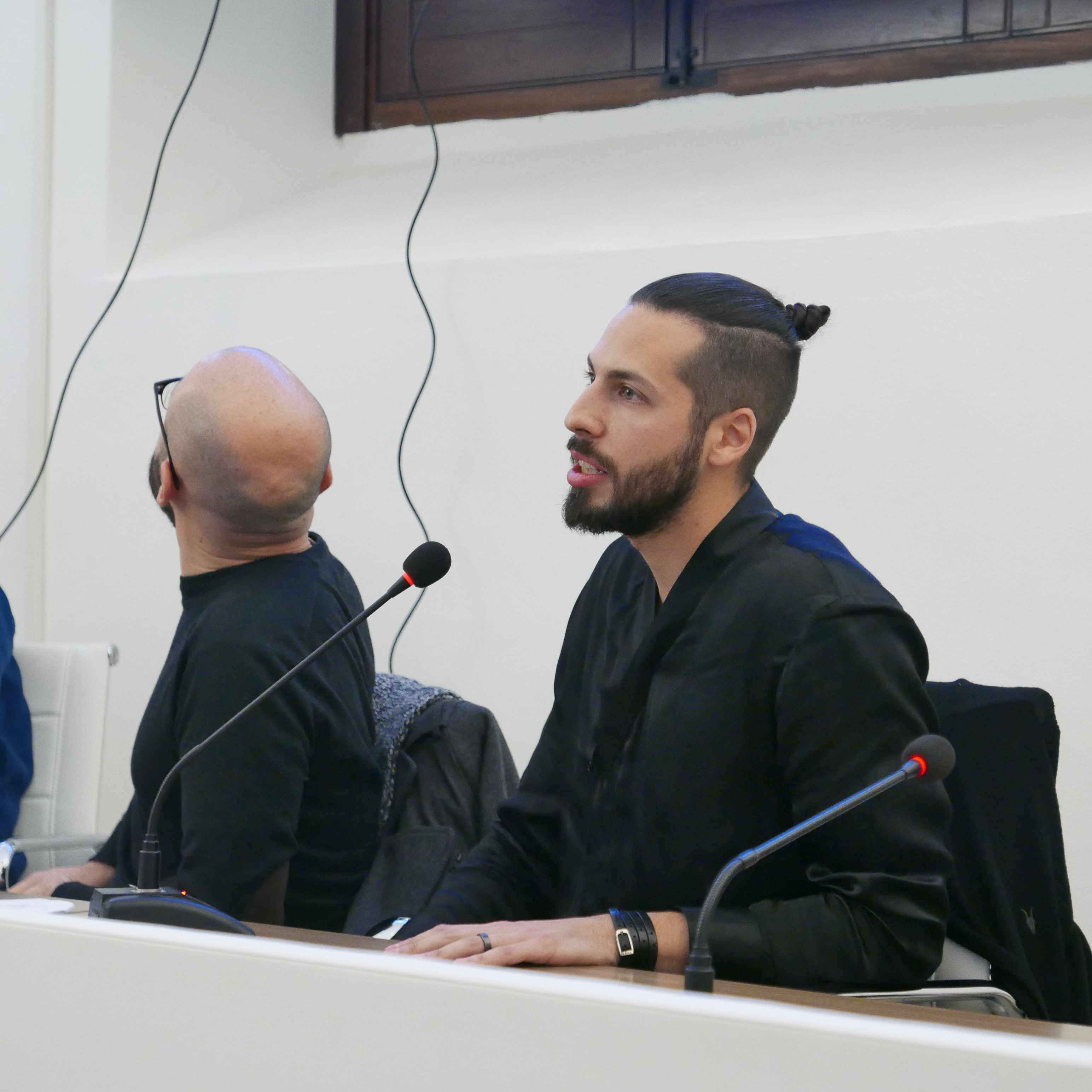
- Born: 1989 (age 36–37)
- Notable work: The Google Trilogy (2012)
- Website: emiliovavarella.com

Emilio Vavarella (born 1989) is an Italian artist and researcher based in Cambridge, Massachusetts. Vavarella is best known for his 2012 work The Google Trilogy, which received attention for its early contribution to new media art and post internet art.

== Education ==
Emilio Vavarella received a BA in Fine Art, Visual, Cultural and Media Studies from the University of Bologna in Italy in 2011. He received an MFA in Visual Arts from Iuav University of Venice.

== Career ==
Emilio Vavarella's first major work came to prominence in 2013 with The Google Trilogy, a three-part series documenting artistic errors in Google Maps.

From 2013 to 2016, Vavarella worked on the Harvestworks TEAM Lab in Digital Media Production in New York City. He served as an expert advisor to the MAXXI Museum in Rome and for Sony Computer Science Laboratory in Paris in 2021, both as part of a European Commission-led initiative to support work at the intersection of science, technology, and art. In 2021, Vavarella was artist-in-residence at the University of Milan as part of a project funded by the European Research Council.

In 2023, Emilio Vavarella served as advisor of the Italian pavilion of the Venice Biennale in the 18th International Architecture Exhibition, curated by Lesley Lokko.

Vavarella has been an artist-in-residence at the Broad Institute of MIT and Harvard in Cambridge, Massachusetts and a 2023 Harvard Horizons Scholar.

Vavarella is currently Assistant Professor of Media and Film Studies at Skidmore College.

== Exhibitions ==
In 2022, Emilio Vavarella was selected by the Zegna Foundation to create a series of works based on Zegna's history in luxury textile production and the reforestation work of Oasi Zegna in the Biellese Alps, Piedmont, Italy. Vavarella's exhibition, titled The Other Shape of Things, used the DNA sequence of a Norwegian spruce tree to create objects using natural materials, weaving, data analysis, and digital elaboration.

Art from The Other Shape of Things series has also been hosted in exhibitions at the Hermitage Museum in St. Petersburg, Russia, and in the permanent collection of the Museum of Modern Art of Bologna, Italy.

== Literature ==
In addition to his artistic work, Vavarella has presented his ideas in the form of interdisciplinary books and essays, usually focusing on topics like philosophy and technology. Mousse Publishing, Italy, published his latest book titled rs548049170_1_69869_TT, which contains thoughts and visuals based on his series The Other Shapes of Me, where his mother produced a tapestry using his genetic code and a jacquard loom.

== See also ==
- Digital art
- Interdisciplinarity
- Interdisciplinary arts
