= Facebook Graph Search =

Semantic search engine by Facebook

Facebook Graph Search feature

Facebook Graph Search was a semantic search engine that Facebook introduced in March 2013. It was designed to give answers to user natural language queries rather than a list of links. The name refers to the social graph nature of Facebook, which maps the relationships among users. The Graph Search feature combined the big data acquired from its over one billion users and external data into a search engine providing user-specific search results. In a presentation headed by Facebook CEO Mark Zuckerberg, it was announced that the Graph Search algorithm finds information from within a user's network of friends. Microsoft's Bing search engine provided additional results. In July it was made available to all users using the U.S. English version of Facebook. After being made less publicly visible starting December 2014, the original Graph Search was almost entirely deprecated in June 2019.

== History ==
=== Initial development ===
The feature was developed under former Google employees Lars Rasmussen and Tom Stocky.

The Graph Search Features was launched in Beta in January 2013 as a limited preview for some English users in the United States. Company reports indicate that the service launched to between tens and hundreds of thousands of users.

The feature has been released only to limited users, with a slow expansion planned. Facebook announced plans for a future mobile interface and the inclusion of Instagram photos.

In late September 2013, Facebook announced that it would begin rolling out search for posts and comments as part of Graph Search. The rollout began in October 2013, but many people who had Graph Search were not given immediate access to this feature. A post on the Facebook Engineering blog explained that the huge amount of post and comment data, coming to a total of 700 TB, meant that developing Graph Search for posts was substantially more challenging than the original Graph Search.

=== Removal from public visibility from December 2014 onward ===
In December 2014, Facebook changed its search features, dropping partnership with Bing. Around the same time, Facebook changed the way searches could be done through the website and app, obscuring some of the previous graph search functionality, but most of the functionality was still available through direct construction of the search urls.

Over the next few years, the online intelligence community, investigative journalists, and criminal investigators developed tools and practices to more effectively use Facebook Graph Search despite it not being publicly visible. One of these, Stalkscan, received media attention. Graph.tips was a frequently used tool in the online intelligence community as an interface on top of Facebook Graph Search.

=== Deprecation of most functionality in June 2019 ===
In early June 2019, the feature was further deprecated, with the majority of URLs for graph search queries no longer working. Facebook explained this by saying: "The vast majority of people on Facebook search using keywords, a factor which led us to pause some aspects of graph search and focus more on improving keyword search. We are working closely with researchers to make sure they have the tools they need to use our platform." However, there was speculation that the shutdown of Graph Search may also have been motivated by privacy concerns.

Many tools that depended on Facebook Graph Search, including Stalkscan and graph.tips, had much of their functionality stop working, though some tools were updated using complicated workarounds for some queries. Vice quoted Bellingcat's Nick Waters as saying: "Now that Graph Search has gone down, it's become evident that it's used by some incredibly important section[s] of society, from human rights investigators and citizens wanting to hold their countries to account, to police investigating people trafficking and sexual slavery, to emergency responders."

== Operation ==
Graph Search operated by use of a search algorithm similar to traditional search engines such as Google. However, the search feature is distinguished as a semantic search engine, searching based on intended meaning. Rather than returning results based on matching keywords, the search engine is designed to match phrases, as well as objects on the site.

Search results were based on both the content of the user and their friends’ profiles and the relationships between the user and their friends. Results were based on the friends and interests expressed on Facebook, and also shaped by users’ privacy settings. In addition to being restricted from seeing some content, users could sometimes view relevant content made publicly available by users not listed as friends.

Entries into the search bar were auto-completed as users typed, with Facebook suggesting friends and second degree connections, Facebook pages, automatically generated topics, and Web searches for anything Facebook was not able to search for.

The operation of the search feature depended on user involvement. The feature was intended to encourage users to add more friends, more quickly. In doing so, it could provide updating, more data-rich results and stimulate use of the feature.

=== Search functions ===
Facebook supported searches for the following types:

- People
- Pages
- Places (limitable to a specific location (latitude and longitude) and distance)
- Check-ins of the user, friends, or where user or friends have been tagged
- Objects with location information attached. In addition, the returned objects will be those in which the user or friends have been tagged, or those objects that were created by the user or friends.
- Users could filter results, such as in time (since and until), or search only a given user's News feed and much more new.

The feature also allowed users to search the web directly.

=== Examples ===
Tom Stocky of the search team offered several examples of potential queries during the launch presentation, including,

- "Friends who Like Star Wars and Harry Potter"
- For setting up a potential date, "Who are single men in San Francisco and are from India"
- For employee recruiting, "NASA employees who are friends with people at Facebook"
- For browsing photos or planning travel, "photos of my friends taken at National Parks"

During its roll-out stage, bloggers showed how Facebook Graph Search could be used to uncover potentially embarrassing information (e.g., companies employing people who like racism) or illegal interests (e.g., Chinese residents who like the banned group Falun Gong).

Microsoft was partnered with Facebook to provide search results from 2008 to 2014. Microsoft Live Search came to be known as Bing following the initiation of the partnership. In 2010, Facebook and Bing partnered to offer socially oriented search results: ‘People Search’ and ‘Liked by your Facebook Friends’ information appeared in results within Facebook and on Bing.com.

In May 2012, Bing launched a social sidebar feature which displayed Facebook content alongside of search results. Promoted on the basis of asking friends for advice, the feature allows users to broadcast queries related to their searches to Facebook friends, and offers recommendations of Facebook friends, as well as experts from other networks who could be capable of offering insight.

The previously developed Instant Personalization feature integrated friends’ publicly available information, such as likes, into content on other external websites, such as Rotten Tomatoes and Yelp.

The emergence of the Graph Search feature builds on this partnership. Facebook content remains on Bing.com. The focus of Graph Search is internal content, but Bing continues to issue search results of external content. The external search results are based on traditional keyword-match.

== Advertising ==
In 2012, Facebook introduced sponsored pages in search results. By buying "Targeted Entities" on Facebook, advertisers pay to have their page appear when users search for that entity. Facebook CEO Zuckerberg reported that this would remain a feature of the search feature, but that the advertising component had not been extended in the Graph Search feature.

Criticisms arose about the integrity of search results on the basis of "buying likes". This practice refers to situations in which companies, without sponsoring results, accumulate a large number of "likes" through practices such as promotions or paying to operate bot accounts. Critics argued that this rendered results allegedly based on other users’ opinions meaningless.

== Open Graph ==
The Open Graph feature allows developers to integrate their applications and pages into the Facebook platform, and links Facebook with external sites on the Internet. The feature operates by allowing the addition of metadata to turn websites into graph objects. Actions made using the app are expressed on users’ profile pages.

== Privacy ==
Initial reactions to the launch of Graph Search included many concerns about privacy. The social media analytics company Crimson Hexagon reported that 19 percent of users discussing the launch of the feature were stating concerns about privacy. Facebook has alluded to these concerns and emphasized that the search operates within the pre-existing privacy settings: users can access only the information already available to them. The feature makes this information easier and potentially more appealing to find. Related concerns about phishing and the appearance of minors in search results have also been expressed.
