= Jens Eilstrup Rasmussen =

Danish software engineer (born 1966)

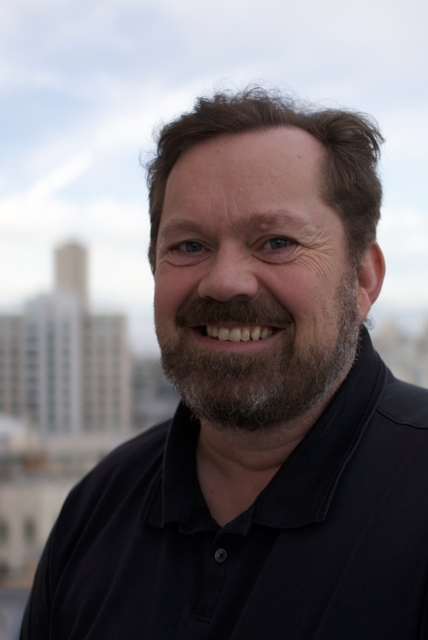
- Rasmussen in 2014
- Born: 1966 (age 59–60)
- Citizenship: Danish
- Education: Aarhus University
- Known for: Google Maps; Google Wave; Google Maps pin
- Relatives: Lars Rasmussen (brother)
- Website: www.linkedin.com/in/jens-eilstrup-rasmussen/

Jens Eilstrup Rasmussen (born 1966) is a Danish software engineer, technology executive, and co-founder of Where 2 Technologies which led to Google Maps.

== Early life ==
After graduating from Høje-Taastrup Amtsgymnasium in 1986, Rasmussen enrolled at the University of Aarhus to study Computer Science and Mathematics.

== Digital Fountain ==
From July 1999 to November 2002, Rasmussen was a senior engineer at Digital Fountain in California. Digital Fountain used forward error correction to deliver files and stream on-demand content over dynamic mobile, internet and private network environments. Rasmussen developed several new services while employed by Digital Fountain.

== Where 2 Technologies and Google Maps ==
In early 2003, Rasmussen and his brother Lars started Where 2 Technologies, a mapping project that developed the prototype of their mapping application called Expedition. Google acquired Where 2 Technologies in October 2004, and the Rasmussen brothers led the team that launched Google Maps in early 2005.

== Google Wave ==
Rasmussen invented Google Wave in 2004, while the brothers were in talks with Google about selling Where 2 Technologies to Google. The Rasmussen brothers started working on Google Wave in 2006, and in 2007 Jens moved to Sydney, Australia, where he continued working with Lars and a small team on the Google Wave idea, under the project name Walkabout. Google Wave was an open source code internet application launched in 2009 and discontinued in 2012.

Google described Wave as an application which "lets you communicate and collaborate in real time." Wave made it possible for several people to edit a document at the same time and to conduct a group discussion at the same time. Waves could also be used as forums or just for emails and instant messaging between two or more people.

== Google Maps pin ==
Rasmussen designed the Google Maps pin while he was employed by Google. The pin is a simple pointer with a bubble top which tapers to a narrow point with a drop shadow. A Google spokesperson told The New York Times that Rasmussen avoided using a star or dot on the map, because they would obscure too much of the map. The Google Maps pin touches the map only at the exact point of the location.

In 2014, Museum of Modern Art in New York City acquired a representation of the Google Maps Pin for its permanent collection.

== Patents ==
Rasmussen holds patents on thirty-five software services and applications.

== Awards ==
Google Maps won two Webby Awards in 2006, one in the General Website Services category and another in the Best Practices category.

In 2010, the Pearcey Foundation named the Rasmussen brothers New South Wales ICT Entrepreneurs of the Year and inducted them into the foundation's hall of fame. The foundation noted that the Rasmussens had positioned Australia "as a global leader in online services" and brought many technology jobs to Australia.

In 2011, the Rasmussen brothers won the Inaugural 2011 Benson Entrepreneur Award. The Pearcey Foundation notes that the invention of Google maps motivated Google to start a research and development team in Sydney, Australia.
