= George Duff =

Royal Navy officer (1764–1805)

Captain George Duff
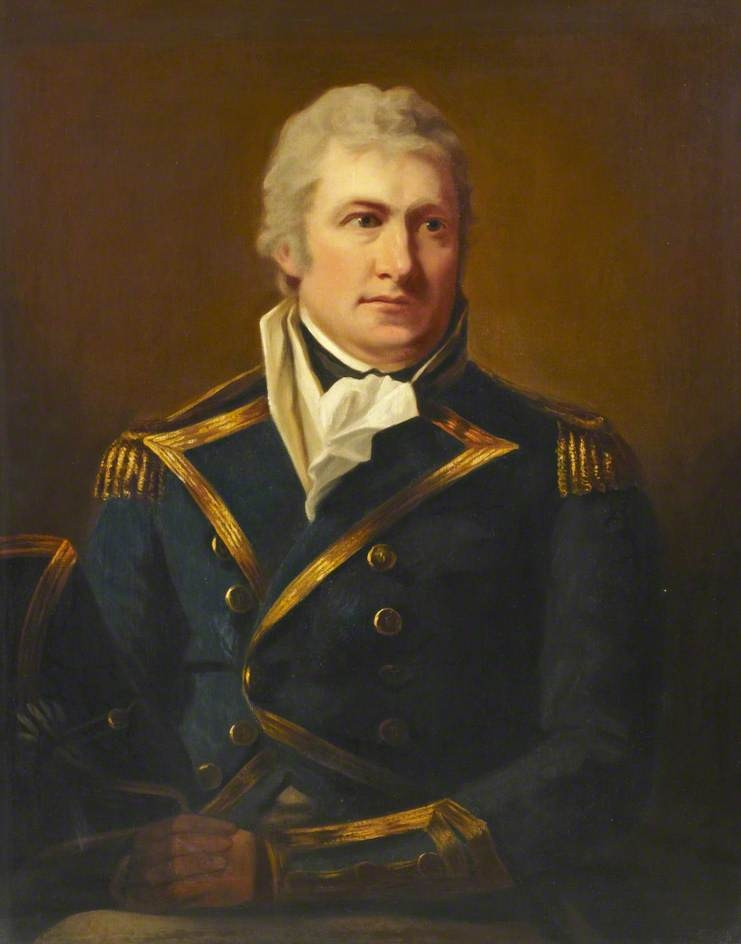
- Portrait by Henry Raeburn, c. 1800
- Born: 1 February 1764; Banff, Aberdeenshire
- Died: 21 October 1805 (aged 41); Off Cape Trafalgar, Atlantic Ocean
- Cause of death: Killed in action
- Resting place: Buried at sea
- Occupation: Royal Navy Officer
- Spouse: Sophia Dirom 1764–1827
- Children: Norwich Duff 1792–1862; Mary Anne Fotheringham Duff 1794–1796; Jemima Duff 1799–1803; Georgina Helen Duff; 1803–1832; Anna Margaret Duff; 1805–1827

Captain George Duff (1 February 1764 – 21 October 1805) was a Royal Navy officer who served in the American War of Independence, the French Revolutionary Wars and the Napoleonic Wars. He was killed by a cannonball at the Battle of Trafalgar.

== Early life ==
Born at Banff, Scotland, the son of Banff Sheriff Clerk James Duff (1729–1804) by his marriage to Helen Skene 1734–1764, he was a kinsman (first cousin once removed) to the second and third Earls of Fife.

George Duff had a passion for the sea from early childhood, stowing away on a merchant ship for a voyage when not yet a teenager. At thirteen he joined his great uncle Captain (later Admiral) Robert Duff in the Mediterranean, and was commissioned lieutenant at sixteen, breaking several fleet regulations but made possible by his uncle's interest in his career. During these years, Duff saw action thirteen times on both sides of the Atlantic, including at the Great Siege of Gibraltar and culminating in the battle of the Saintes in 1782 when he was serving on HMS Montagu.

== Naval career ==
With a reputation thus secured and plenty of family interest in his career, Duff had little difficulty progressing, being promoted to commander in 1790 and then post captain in 1793, a meteoric rise resulting from the growth of the Navy in the buildup to war during this period. It was at this time that he married his childhood sweetheart, Sophia Dirom (sister of Alexander Dirom) in Edinburgh, and that his son Norwich Duff (later to become an admiral in his own right) was born. In the next ten years, Duff commanded HMS Duke, HMS Vengeance and HMS Glenmore all very capably, but without winning the acclaim of some of his contemporaries, particularly those in the Mediterranean under Nelson.

Duff was a proud Scotsman as well as a strict disciplinarian. He enforced cleanliness parades every week, and made every effort to make sure that as many Scots as possible served on his ships, although he never gave them preferential treatment over their English comrades. He was also a devoted husband and wrote lengthy letters to his wife during every journey. He and his wife felt that the letters were so personal that they destroyed them after reading, and so the only survivor is his final letter home, which Sophia reportedly was unable to destroy.

Following the Peace of Amiens, Duff was given HMS Mars, something of a celebrity ship in the Royal Navy following her capture of the French Hercule in 1799 in which her captain Alexander Hood was killed. Rapidly moulding the ship with his own brand of Scottish discipline, Duff took her to join the fleet off Cádiz at the beginning of October and instantly became friends with Nelson, despite their vastly different characters. Such was Duff's reputation, that Nelson entrusted him with the command of the inshore squadron, which watched the harbour entrance for an enemy appearance. The job was dangerous due to the proximity of the shore, and unpleasant because ships stationed at this point were exposed to the enemy and the threat of failure if the enemy were able to escape. Duff handled the job excellently however, and on 21 October reported that the enemy had left Cadiz and were heading out to sea.

== Trafalgar ==
When the battle began, Mars was stationed directly astern of HMS Royal Sovereign and was ordered by Nelson to attempt to overtake this, Collingwood's flagship, if he was able. Collingwood, however, had the advantage, with the Royal Sovereign's hull having been freshly re-coppered before action, so the Mars was the second ship to enter the enemy lines. During this approach, which due to poor wind had been conducted at walking speed, Duff was able to write a final note home to his wife, which he entrusted to his thirteen-year-old son Norwich, who was serving as a midshipman on Mars:

Dearest Sophia, I have just time to tell you we are going into Action with the Combined Fleet. I hope and trust in God that we shall all behave as becomes us, and that I may yet have the happiness of taking my beloved wife and children in my arms. Norwich is quite well and happy. I have, however, ordered him off the quarter-deck. Yours ever, and most truly, George

=== Death ===
Duff did not see more than the few opening shots of the battle, for as Mars engaged the French Fougueux and Pluton, a cannonball from Fougueux raked the quarterdeck and struck Captain Duff at the base of the neck, severing his head completely. The crew were undismayed however, carrying the headless corpse around the deck and giving three cheers in memory of their captain, before replacing him where he fell and covering him with a Union Flag. Command of the Mars devolved on the first lieutenant, William Hennah, who performed a good service and was promoted as a reward.

== Burial and memorial ==
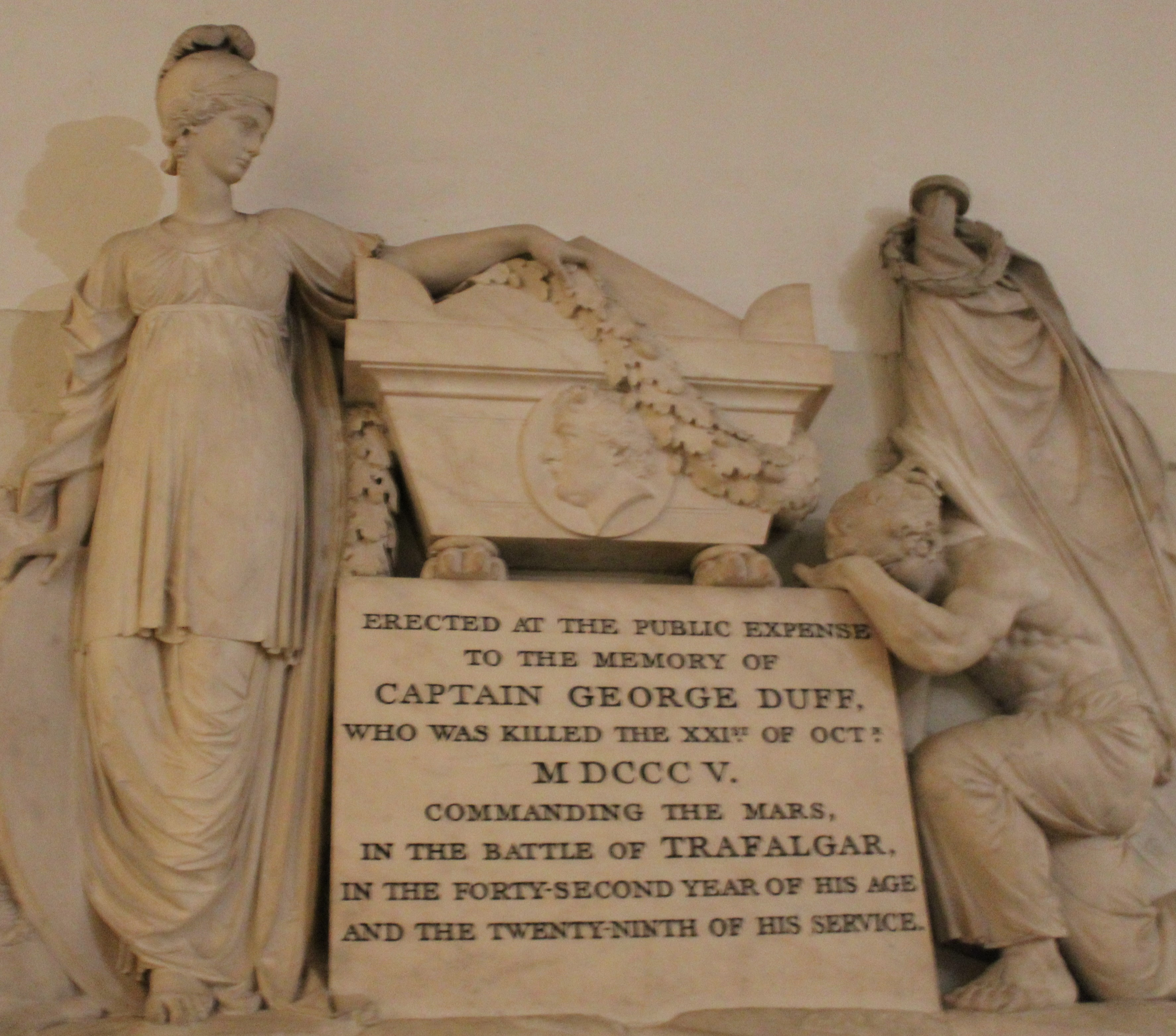
Duff's memorial, crypt of St Paul's Cathedral, London

Following the battle, Duff was buried at sea with his shipmates, 28 of whom had been killed and 69 wounded in the fight. Both Collingwood and young Norwich Duff wrote letters of consolation to Sophia Duff, and Captain Duff was mentioned with honour alongside Nelson and John Cooke in the official report of the battle. Lloyd's Patriotic Fund granted Sophia honours and money. Norwich remained in the Navy, retiring many years later as an admiral. A large marble monument by John Bacon with the inscription "Erected at the Public Expense to the memory of Captain George Duff who was killed the XXIst of Octr MDCCCV. commanding the Mars in the battle of Trafalgar in the forty-second year of his age and the twenty-ninth of his service." was raised in St Paul's Cathedral on the wall on the south side of a passage, next to Nelson's tomb, where it can still be seen. George, his mother-in-law Anne (née Fotheringham) and Norwich were all painted by Sir Henry Raeburn.

== Namesakes ==
The Royal Navy has named two ships after Duff. The first, a Captain-class frigate constructed in the United States in 1942–1943 as HMS Duff (BDE-20), was retained by the United States Navy as the destroyer escort USS LeHardy (DE-20). The second was the Captain-class frigate HMS Duff (K352), which served from 1943 to 1944.
