= Schetky =

Schetky may refer to:

== People ==
- George Schetky (1776–1831), American composer
- John Alexander Schetky (1785–1824), Scottish painter
- John Christian Schetky (1778–1874), Scottish painter

== Other uses ==
- Schetky Northwest Sales, Inc., bus company in Oregon
