= Norwich Duff =

Royal Navy admiral

Vice-Admiral Norwich Duff FRSE
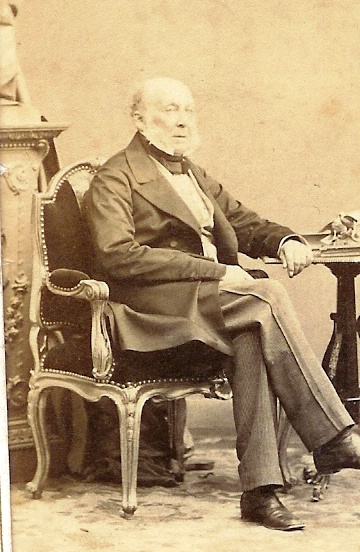
- Born: 15 August 1792; 9 South Castle Street, Edinburgh, Scotland, Great Britain
- Died: 21 April 1862 (aged 69); Bath, Somerset, England, UK
- Relatives: Captain George Duff RN (father)
- Military career
- Allegiance: United Kingdom
- Branch: Royal Navy
- Service years: 1805–1862
- Rank: Vice-Admiral

Vice-Admiral Norwich Duff FRSE (15 August 1792 – 21 April 1862) was a Royal Navy officer.

== Life ==
The son of Captain George Duff RN, and Sophia Dirom, he was born at 9 South Castle Street, Edinburgh. He entered the Royal Navy in July 1805, just before his 13th birthday, serving aboard his father's ship Mars as a midshipman. His father was killed in October 1805 at the Battle of Trafalgar.

Duff was promoted to lieutenant in September 1811 and was appointed flag lieutenant to the commander-in-chief in February 1814. He served on Euryalus. He was promoted to commander on 15 June 1814 and appointed to command of the 18-gun brig-sloop Espoir, part of the naval force in the Chesapeake during the War of 1812, and later took part in the attack on New Orleans.

In October 1816 Duff was appointed to command of the 10-gun brig-sloop Beaver and sent to the Caribbean, where he assumed command of the 18-gun Rifleman in September 1817. He returned to England in August 1818.

He undertook an extensive continental European tour in 1819 of which he kept a journal. He was promoted to post-captain on 23 April 1822.

In 1823 he was elected a Fellow of the Royal Society of Edinburgh, his proposer being a relative, Alexander Dirom.

On 10 June 1833 he married Helen Mary Shoolbred (daughter of East India Company Surgeon John Shoolbred 1766–1831) at Bath, Somerset and together they produced eight recorded children. The couple's eldest daughter, (Helen) Sophia Duff 1834–1930, married Boscawen Trevor Griffith (whose name was later changed to Griffith-Boscawen) as a result of which Norwich became the maternal grandfather of Arthur Sackville Trevor Griffith-Boscawen 1865–1946, a prominent British Conservative politician during the early decades of the twentieth century. Another daughter, Henrietta A. Duff, was a novelist.

Duff was promoted to rear admiral on 8 October 1852, and to vice admiral on 28 November 1857.

He died at Bath, Somerset, England on 21 April 1862, where he was a prominent member of the Bath and County Club.

His portrait was painted by Sir Henry Raeburn, and a metal plaque commemorates him in Bath Abbey.

== Family ==
In 1833 he married Helen Mary Shoolbred (1811–1895), daughter of John Shoolbred of the East India Company.

== See also ==
- O'Byrne, William Richard (1849). "Duff, Norwich" . A Naval Biographical Dictionary . John Murray – via Wikisource.
