= HMS Duff (K352) =

Frigate of the Royal Navy

History

United States
- Name: USS Lamons (DE-64)
- Namesake: Boatswain's Mate Second Class Kenneth Tafe Lamons, who performed heroically during the Japanese attack on Pearl Harbor on 7 December 1941 before dying of wounds
- Builder: Bethlehem-Hingham Shipyard, Hingham, Massachusetts
- Laid down: 22 February 1943
- Launched: 22 May 1943
- Completed: 23 August 1943
- Commissioned: never
- Fate: Transferred to United Kingdom 23 August 1943
- Acquired: Returned by United Kingdom 28 August 1945
- Stricken: 17 September 1945
- Fate: Sold May 1947 for scrapping

United Kingdom
- Name: HMS Duff (K352)
- Namesake: Captain George Duff (1764-1805), British naval officer who was killed in action as commanding officer of HMS Mars at the Battle of Trafalgar
- Acquired: 23 August 1943
- Commissioned: 23 August 1943
- Fate: Constructive total loss after 30 November 1944; Returned to U.S. Navy 28 August 1945

General characteristics
- Displacement: 1,400 long tons (1,422 t)
- Length: 306 ft (93 m)
- Beam: 36.75 ft (11.2 m)
- Draught: 9 ft (2.7 m)
- Propulsion: Two Foster-Wheeler Express "D"-type water-tube boilers; GE 13,500 shp (10,070 kW) steam turbines and generators (9,200 kW); Electric motors for 12,000 shp (8,900 kW); Two shafts
- Speed: 24 knots (44 km/h)
- Range: 5,500 nautical miles (10,200 km) at 15 knots (28 km/h)
- Complement: 186
- Sensors & processing systems: SA & SL type radars; Type 144 series Asdic; MF Direction Finding antenna; HF Direction Finding Type FH 4 antenna
- Armament: 3 × 3 in (76 mm) /50 Mk.22 guns; 1 × twin Bofors 40 mm mount Mk.I; 7–16 × 20 mm Oerlikon guns; Mark 10 Hedgehog antisubmarine mortar; Depth charges; QF 2-pounder naval gun
- Notes: Pennant number K352

HMS Duff (K352) was a British Captain-class frigate of the Royal Navy that served during World War II. Originally constructed as the United States Navy Buckley class destroyer escort USS Lamons (DE-64), she was transferred to the Royal Navy before she was completed.

== Construction and transfer ==
The ship was laid down as the U.S. Navy destroyer escort USS Lamons (DE-64) by Bethlehem-Hingham Shipyard, Inc., in Hingham, Massachusetts, on 22 February 1943 and launched on 22 May 1943. Lamons was transferred to the United Kingdom upon completion on 23 August 1943.

== Service history ==
Commissioned into service in the Royal Navy as the frigate HMS Duff (K352) on 23 August 1943 simultaneously with her transfer, the ship served on patrol and escort duty. At 0745 on 30 November 1944, she struck a mine in the North Sea off Ostend, Belgium, suffering three dead. Although badly damaged, she managed to limp back to port at Harwich, England.

Damaged beyond economical repair, Duff was declared a constructive total loss. The Royal Navy returned her to the U.S. Navy on 28 August 1945.

== Disposal ==
The U.S. Navy struck Duff from its Naval Vessel Register on 17 September 1945. She was sold in May 1947 for scrapping in the Netherlands.
