= Admiral Duff =

Admiral Duff may refer to:

- Alexander Duff (Royal Navy officer) (1862–1933), British Royal Navy admiral
- Norwich Duff (1792–1862), British Royal Navy admiral
- Robert Duff (Royal Navy officer) (c. 1721–1787), British Royal Navy admiral
