= William Muir (divine) =

Scottish minister

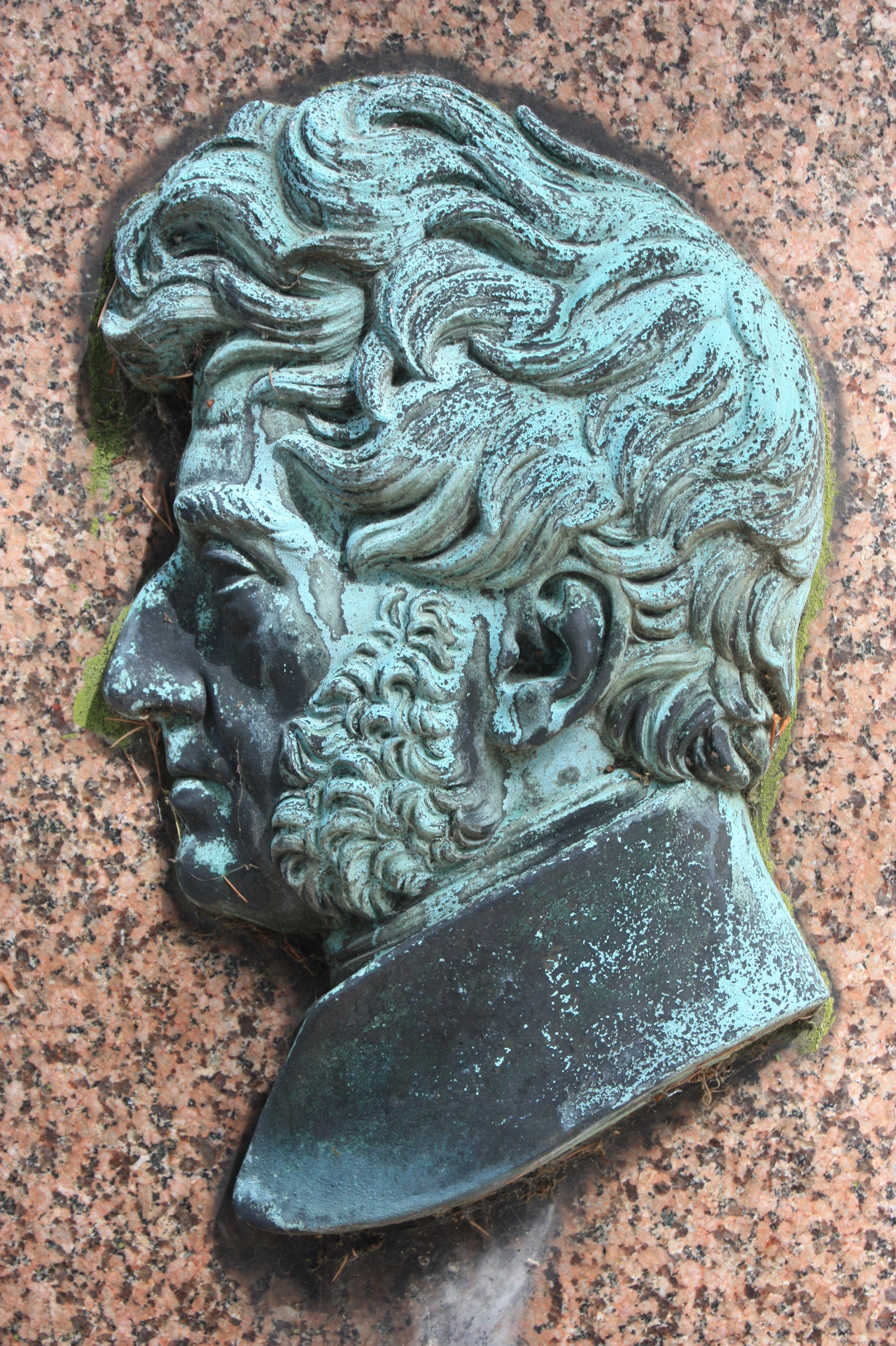
Rev Dr William Muir by Sir John Steell

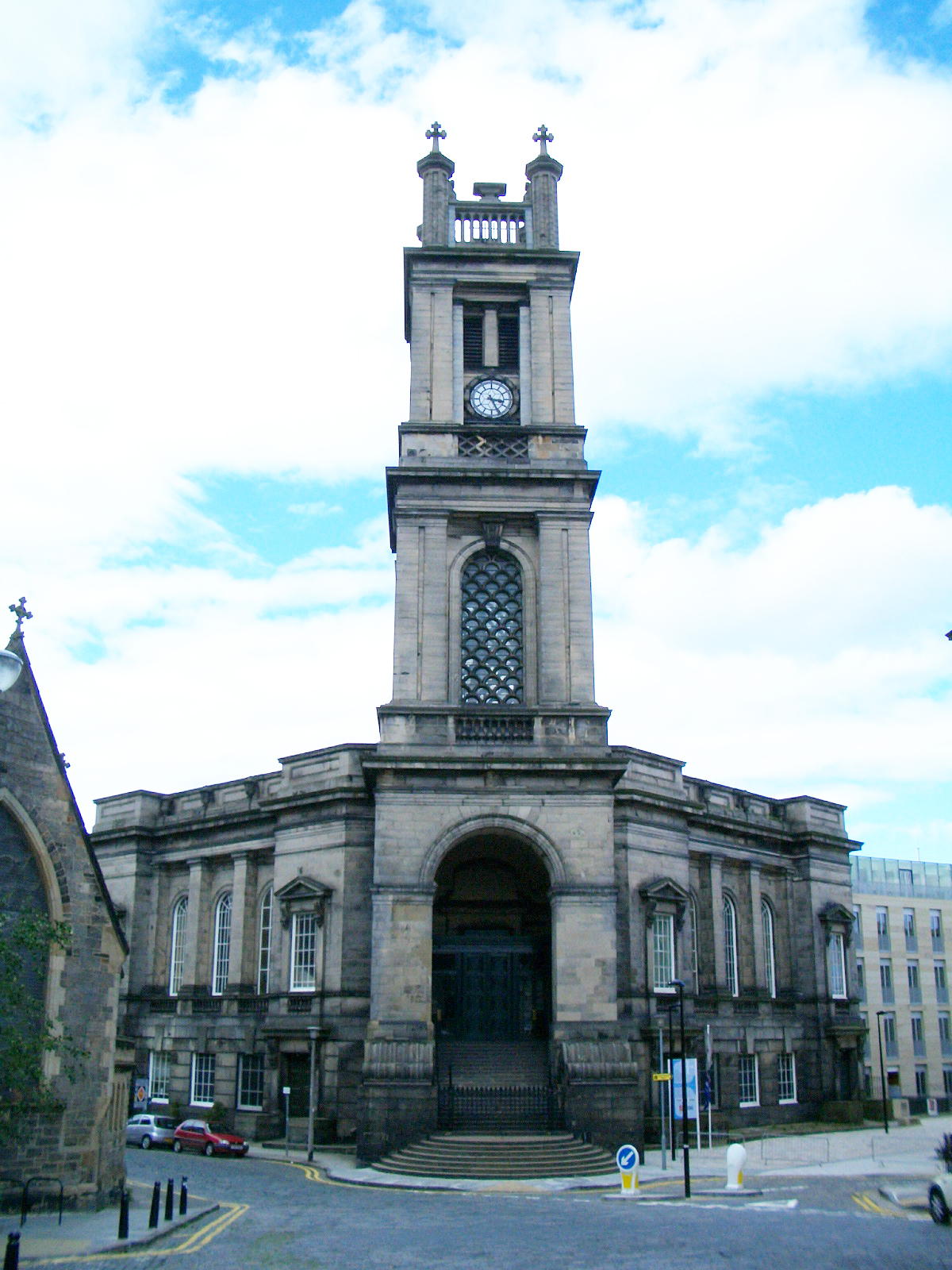
St Stephens Church Edinburgh

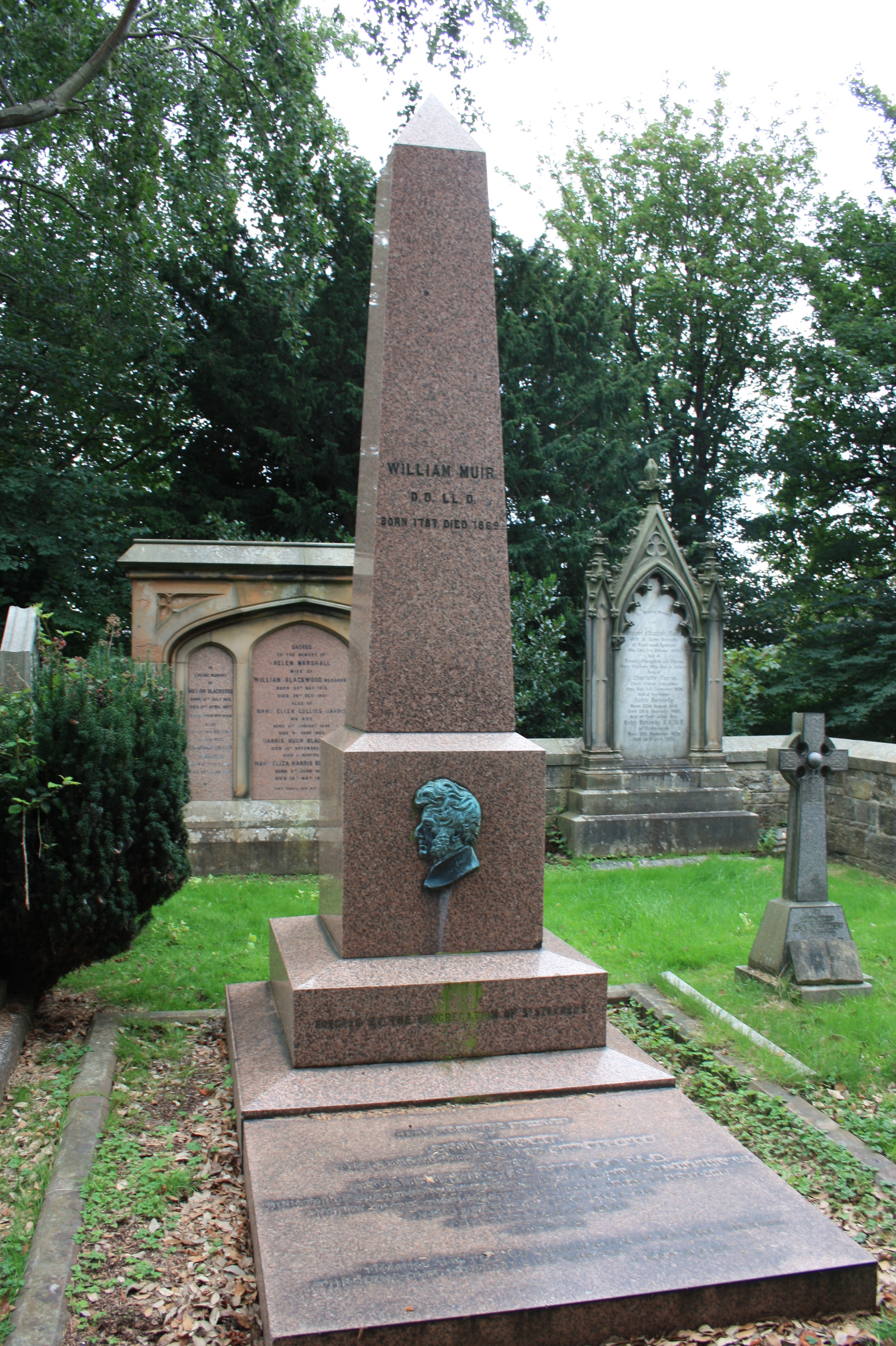
The grave of Muir, Dean Cemetery, Edinburgh

William Muir FRSE (1787–1869) was a Scottish minister of the Church of Scotland. He served as Moderator of the General Assembly of the Church of Scotland in 1838.

== Life ==
He was born in Glasgow on 11 October 1787 the third son of William Muir a merchant. He was educated at Glasgow High School then went to first Glasgow University for a general degree then Edinburgh University to study Divinity.

He was licensed to preach as a Church of Scotland minister by the Presbytery of Glasgow in November 1810. In August 1812 he was ordained as minister of St George's Parish in Glasgow. He was awarded an honorary Doctor of Divinity from Edinburgh University in 1820.

In September 1822 he was translated to the prestigious role as minister of New Greyfriars back in Edinburgh. In February 1829 he moved to the newly completed St Stephen's Church in Stockbridge, Edinburgh, as its first minister. In Edinburgh he then lived at 5 St Bernards Crescent, 400m west of the church. The outstanding Georgian crescent was also newly completed.

He was elected a Fellow of the Royal Society of Edinburgh in 1824, his proposer being Alexander Brunton.

In 1838 he served as Moderator of the General Assembly of the Church of Scotland, succeeding Rev Matthew Gardiner. In 1845 he was made Dean of the Thistle Chapel and created Chaplain in Ordinary to Queen Victoria.

He retired in 1867 due to blindness and was succeeded at St Stephens by Rev Maxwell Nicholson.

He died at Ormelie House in Murrayfield in western Edinburgh on 23 June 1869. He is buried in Dean Cemetery in western Edinburgh. The grave lies in the central southern section and is marked by a large pink granite obelisk. It carries a bronze head sculpted by Sir John Steell.

== Publications ==
- Discourses on the Epistle of St Jude (1822)
- Memoirs and Letters of Rev William Guthrie (1827)
- Sermons on the Seven Churches in Asia (1830)
- Three Sermons on the Present Distress (1832)
- An Arrangement of the Parables (1836)
- Speech on the Auchterarder Case (1839)
- Practical Sermons on the Holy Spirit (1842)
- Metrical Meditations (1870)

== Family ==
He was married twice.

In 1813 he married Hannah Black daughter of James Black, Lord Provost of Glasgow from 1808 to 1810 and 1816 to 1818. Their children included:

- Hannah Shortridge Muir (1816-1822)
- James Muir (b.1817)
- Rev Robert Hugh Muir (1819-1903) minister of Dalmeny
- William (b.1820)
- John (d.1823)
- Rev John Stenhouse Muir (1826-1874) minister of Cockpen

In October 1844, following Hannah's death in August 1827, he married Anne Dirom (1808-1887), twenty years his junior, youngest daughter of Lt Gen Alexander Dirom of Mount Annan, but did not have further children.

== Artistic recognition ==
His portrait by Thomas Guff Lupton is held by the Scottish National Portrait Gallery.
