= Louis Lhéritier =

French Navy officer (1747–1823)

- Born: 17 June 1747; Châteaumeillant, France
- Died: 15 December 1823 (aged 76); Lorient, France
- Military career
- Allegiance: Kingdom of France; French First Republic; First French Empire
- Branch: French Navy; French Imperial Navy
- Service years: 1763–1814
- Rank: Chef de division
- Commands: America; Pluton; Constitution; Hercule; Invincible; Foudroyant
- Conflicts: American Revolutionary War; Battle of Grenada; French Revolutionary Wars; Glorious First of June (surrendered); Croisière du Grand Hiver; Battle of the Raz de Sein (surrendered); Napoleonic Wars

Chef de division Louis Lhéritier (17 June 1747 – 15 December 1823) was a French Navy officer who served in the American Revolutionary War and French Revolutionary and Napoleonic Wars. He took part in the Glorious First of June and the Battle of the Raz de Sein.

== Career ==
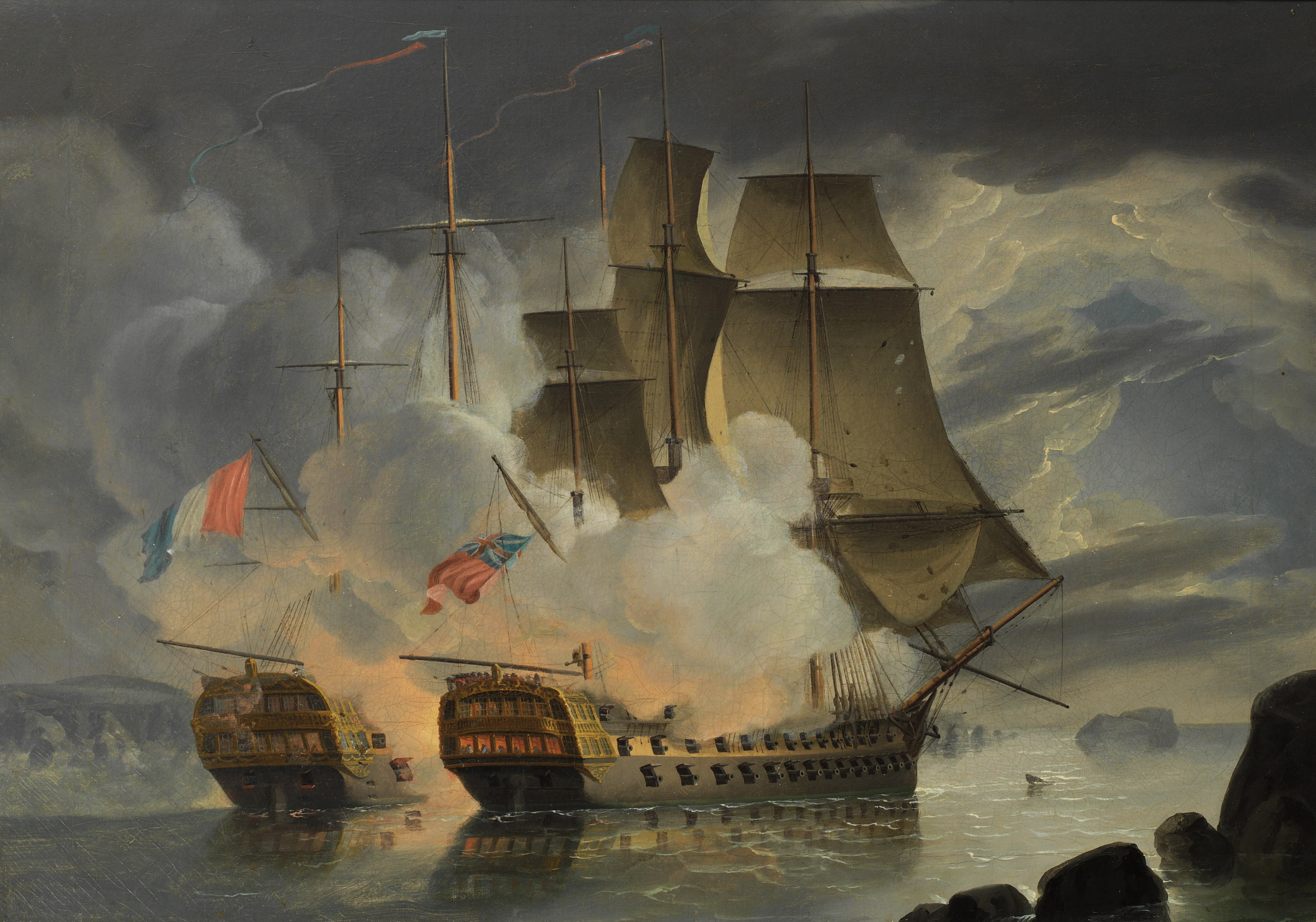
Hercule (left) under Lhéritier at the Battle of the Raz de Sein

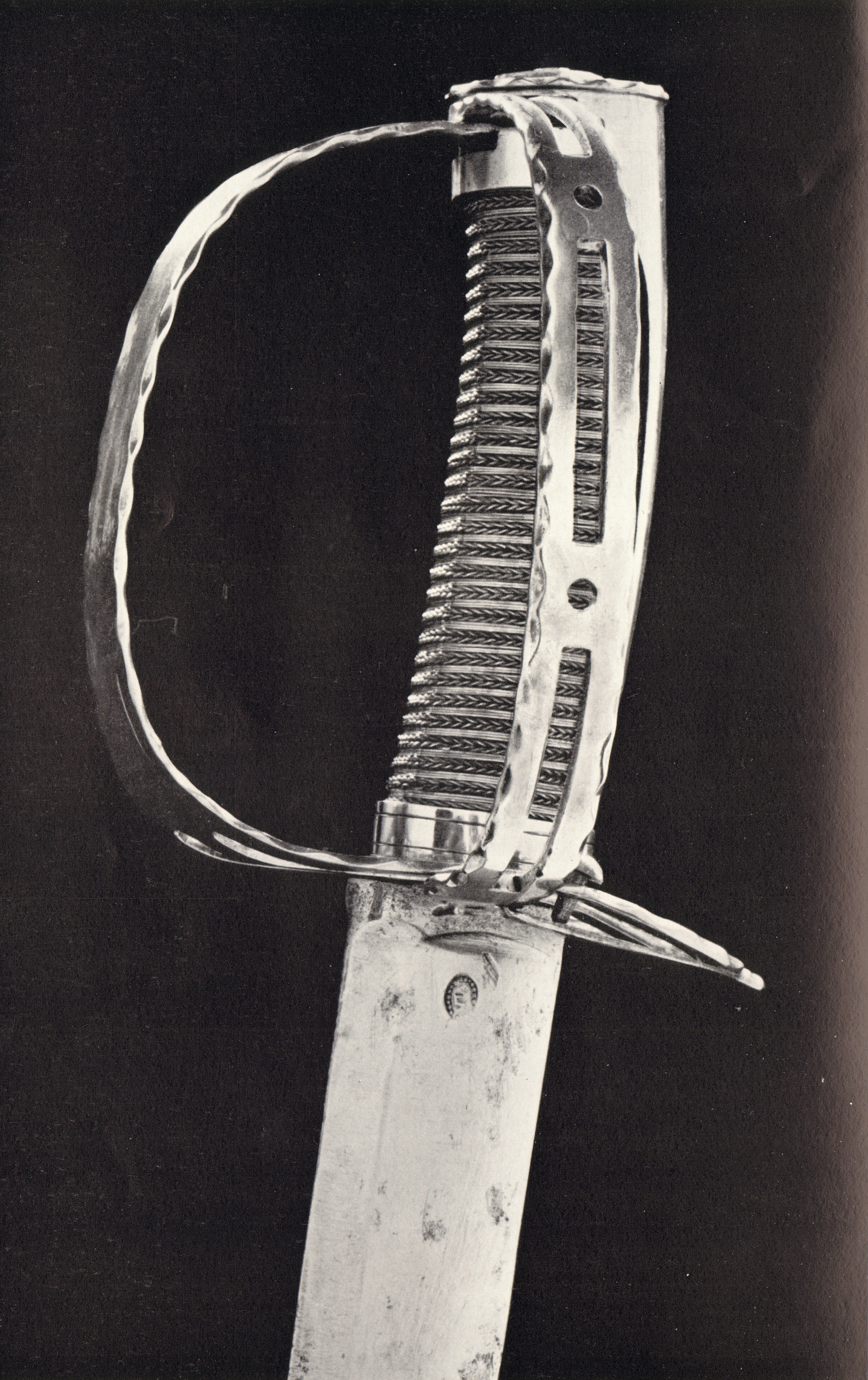
Lhéritier's sword, which he personally surrendered to the British

=== Early career ===
Lhéritier joined the French Navy as a sailor in 1763, serving on the frigate Malicieuse, on Sceptre and Hirondelle the following year, before returning on Malicieuse until 1766. Promoted to helmsman, he embarked on Union in August 1766, and later on the frigates Légère and Indiscrète. Again promoted assistant pilot, he served on the fluyts Gave, Dorothée and Africain.

From 1770, Lhéritier worked in the merchant marine first as an officer on Bellecombe, Coureur and Concorde, and as third captain on Solide, as ensign on Normande, and as first officer on Ville d'Arkhengelsk from 1776 and 1778.

=== War of American Independence ===
He returned to the French Navy for the American Revolutionary War at the rank of frigate lieutenant. He served on the fluyt Bricole from September to December 1778, the frigate Boudeuse until March 1779, and then joined the Guerrier, on which he was wounded during the Battle of Grenada. Between May and October 1780, Lhéritier served on Languedoc, and later on Séraphin and Pivert.

After the war, Lhéritier returned to the merchant Navy, sailing as an officer on a number of ships before earning his commission as captain on Adolphe in April 1792.

=== French Revolution ===
On 17 March 1793, Lhéritier was promoted to ship-of-the-line lieutenant and joined the Navy on the Nymphe. Promoted to ship-of-the-line captain, he was appointed to Convention (ex-Sceptre, on which he had served as a seaman) on 28 October 1793. On 5 May 1794, he took command of the America, which he commanded at the Glorious First of June where his ship and himself were captured by the British.

Lhéritier was kept as a prisoner of war in England until he was exchanged in April 1795, and appointed to Pluton, before being promoted to Chef de Division on 21 March 1796 and transferring on Constitution .

On 14 March 1798, Lhéritier took command of Hercule and was tasked to cruise to Brest, departing from Lorient on the 20th. The next day, Hercule was intercepted by HMS Mars, which led to the Battle of the Raz de Sein. Lhéritier attempted to board Mars, and sustained himself a sabre blow to the head and had his leg injured. After a two-hour fight, Hercule was captured and Lhéritier taken prisoner again.

Exchanged again, Lhéritier was court-martialed for the loss of Hercule, and unanimously acquitted. On 17 March 1799, he was appointed to the 110-gun Invincible, on which he took part in Bruix' expedition of 1799. He later commanded Foudroyant from 5 May to 17 September 1803, before returning on Invincible from 23 September 1803 to 11 April 1807.

=== Late life ===
From then on and until the end of the Empire, Lhéritier served at Brest harbour. At the Bourbon Restoration, he was retired with a pension and the rank of Rear-Admiral.

== Notes and references ==
=== Bibliography ===
- Quintin, Danielle; Quintin, Bernard (2003). Dictionnaire des capitaines de Vaisseau de Napoléon (in French). S.P.M. pp. 242–243. ISBN 2-901952-42-9.
- Troude, Onésime-Joachim (1867). Batailles navales de la France (in French). Vol. 3. Challamel ainé.
- Fonds Marine. Campagnes (opérations; divisions et stations navales; missions diverses). Inventaire de la sous-série Marine BB4. Tome premier : BB4 1 à 482 (1790-1826)
- Fonds Marine. Campagnes (opérations; divisions et stations navales; missions diverses). Inventaire de la sous-série Marine BB4. Tome deuxième : BB4 1 à 482 (1790-1826)
