= John Christian Schetky =

British painter (1778–1874)

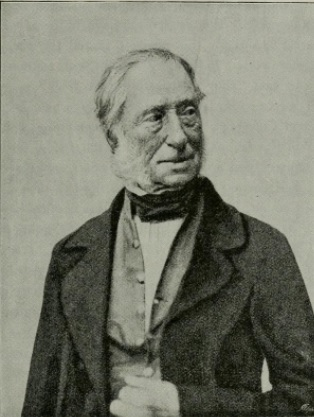
John Christian Schetky

John Christian Schetky (11 August 1778 – 29 January 1874) was a British painter who specialised in marine art.

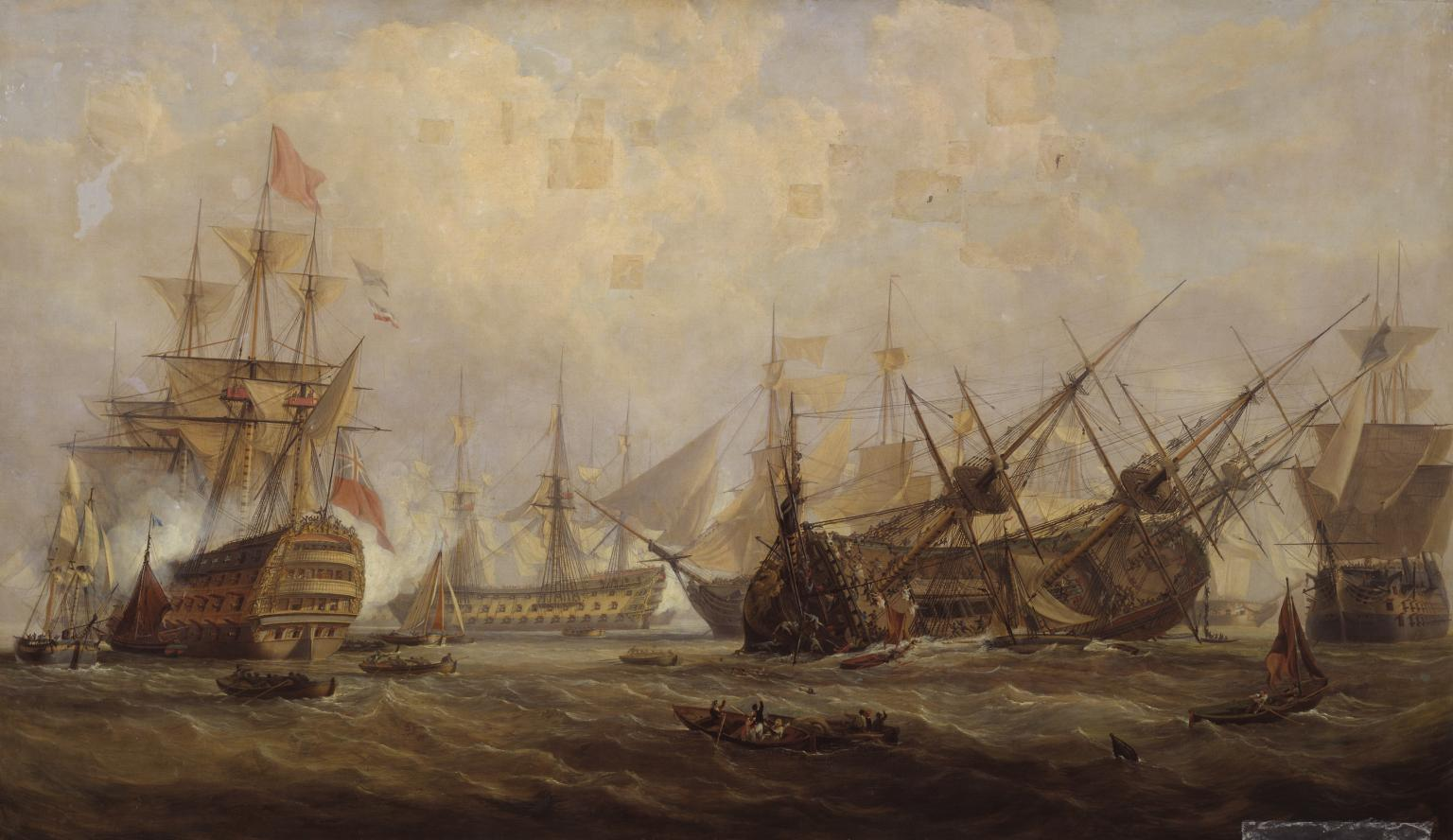
Loss of the Royal George, 1840, Tate Britain

== Early life ==
Schetky was descended from an old Hungarian-Transylvanian family, which, for political reasons, had emigrated to Leipzig at the beginning of the 16th century. His father was Johann Georg Christoff Schetky, a celebrated composer and cellist, who had settled in Edinburgh in 1773, and had married Maria Anna Theresa Reinagle, also of Hungarian descent, in 1774. John Christian was the couple's fourth son. He was educated at the Royal High School, Edinburgh, where he formed a lifelong friendship with his near-contemporary, Walter Scott.

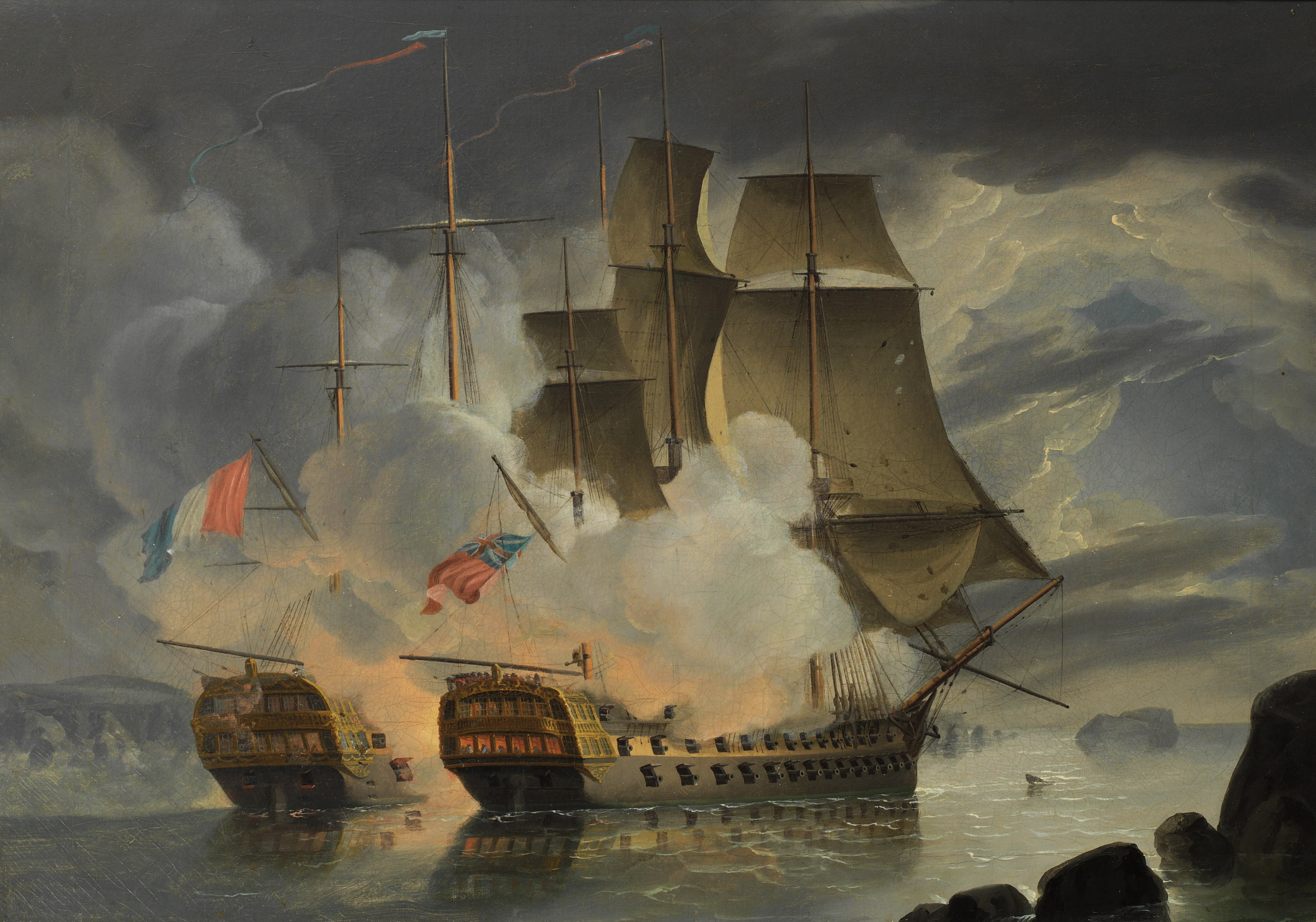
The furious action between H.M.S. Mars and the French '74 Hercule off Brest on 21st April 1798, private collection.

== Career ==
Schetky studied art under Alexander Nasmyth. After travelling on the continent, he settled in Oxford, where he taught for six years as a drawing-master. In 1808 he obtained a post in the Royal Military College at Great Marlow; and three years later he was appointed professor of drawing in the Royal Naval College, Portsmouth, where he had ample opportunities for the study of his favourite marine subjects. Following the abolition of the Naval College, he held a similar professorship from 1836 to 1855 at the East India Company's Military Seminary at Addiscombe, Surrey, where the cadets nicknamed him "Sepia Jack".

From 1805 to 1872 he contributed periodically to the Royal Academy summer exhibitions, and he was represented at the Westminster Hall competition of 1847 by a large oil painting of the Battle of La Hogue. He was marine painter to George IV, William IV and Queen Victoria.

Among his published works were the illustrations to Lord John Manners's Sketches and Notes of a Cruise in Scotch Waters (1850); and a volume entitled Reminiscences of the Veterans of the Sea (1867), which containing photographs of twenty of his paintings and drawings of the great wooden fighting vessels of the Royal Navy.

One of his best-known works, the Loss of the Royal George, painted in 1840, is now in Tate Britain. The United Service Club formerly possessed another important marine painting, showing HMS Endymion, under the command of Sir Charles Paget, rescuing a French man-of-war from extreme danger of shipwreck.

Schetky died in London on 28 January 1874.

== Personal life ==
Schetky married Charlotte Trevenen in 1828. She died in 1867.

His brother John Alexander Schetky was also a painter.

== Biography ==
A memoir by his daughter, entitled Ninety Years of Work and Play, was published in 1877.
