= Battle of the Raz de Sein =

1798 battle of the French Revolutionary Wars

- Part of the French Revolutionary Wars
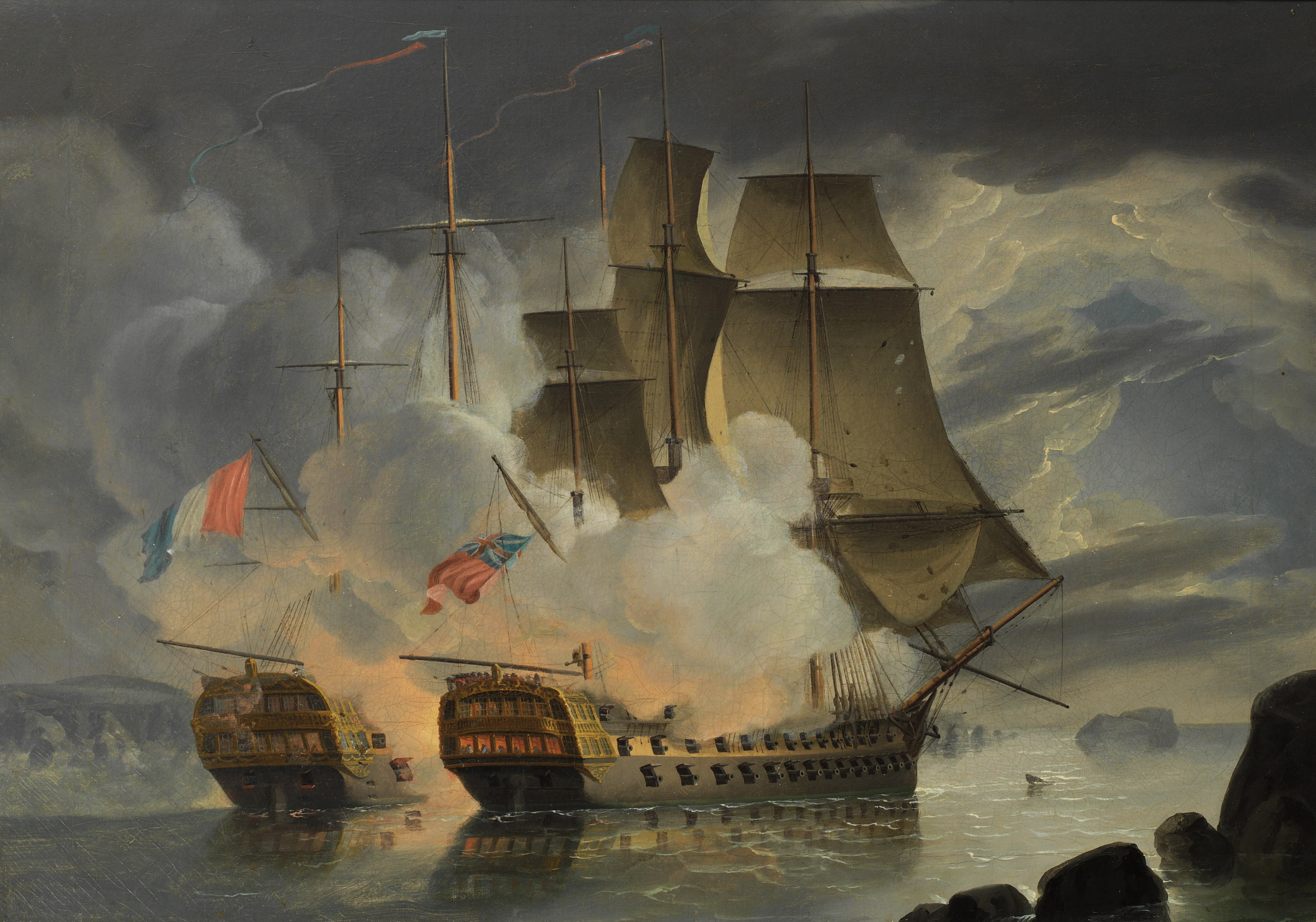
- Painting of the battle by John Christian Schetky
Date	21 April 1798
Location	Raz de Sein, Bay of Biscay 48°02′02″N 04°46′25″W
Result	British victory

Belligerents
Great Britain	France

Commanders and leaders
Alexander Hood †	Louis Lhéritier (surrendered)

Strength
1 ship of the line	1 ship of the line

Casualties and losses
22 killed 60 wounded 8 missing	290 killed or wounded 1 ship of the line captured

The Battle of the Raz de Sein was a single-ship naval engagement of the blockade of Brest during the French Revolutionary Wars between a French and Royal Navy ships of the line on 21 April 1798. The British blockade fleet under Admiral Lord Bridport had sailed from St Helens on 12 April and on the morning of 21 April was crossing the Iroise Passage when sails were spotted to the east. Three ships were detached in pursuit, led by the 74-gun ship of the line HMS Mars under Captain Alexander Hood. As the British ships approached their quarry a third sail was sighted to the southeast close to the coastline and moving north towards Brest.

This ship was the 74-gun Hercule under Ship-of-the-line Captain Louis Lhéritier, newly commissioned at Lorient and sailing to Brest to join the main French fleet and the British squadron immediately changed direction to intercept the new target. Facing overwhelming odds Lhéritier attempted to escape through the narrow Raz de Sein passage, but found the tide against him and so anchored at the mouth of the passage to await the British attack. At 21:15 Mars reached Hercule, coming under heavy fire as Hood manoeuvred into position, bringing his ship crashing alongside the French vessel. For more than an hour the ships fired directly into one another, so close that their guns could not be run out but had to be fired from inside the ships. Damage and casualties were severe on both sides, the latter including Hood who was mortally wounded at the height of the engagement.

Ultimately Hercule was forced to surrender after attempts to board Mars failed. Both ships were battered and burnt, with the French suffering at least 290 casualties and the British 90. Hercule was conveyed to Britain in the aftermath and later repaired and served in the Royal Navy until 1810. Both Lhéritier and the deceased Hood were highly praised for their conduct during the battle, which is noted as being a very rare example during this period of an action between two ships of approximately equal strength without any external influence.

== Background ==
During the French Revolutionary Wars the Royal Navy had exerted dominance at sea over its continental rivals, most immediately the French Navy with its principal fleet based at Brest on the Breton coast of the Bay of Biscay. To contain this fleet the British practiced a close blockade strategy; maintaining a fleet off Brest whenever weather conditions permitted to prevent the French fleet from breaking out into the Atlantic Ocean. This blockade force also limited French trade and maritime communications, attacking merchant ships and individual warships seeking to resupply or reinforce the main French fleet. This made French maritime journeys extremely hazardous even in inshore waters: in June 1795 the main French fleet had suffered a defeat at the hands of the blockade force at the Battle of Groix in the approaches to the port of Lorient, while at the action of 13 January 1797 the independently sailing 74-gun ship of the line Droits de l'Homme was driven ashore and destroyed in the approaches to Brest by two frigates of the blockade squadron.

On 12 April 1798 the British blockade fleet under the command of Admiral Lord Bridport sailed from its winter anchorage at St Helens on the Isle of Wight for the Breton coast. Bridport mustered ten ships of the line to maintain the watch on Brest, although detachments of the fleet had been cruising in the region since 25 January and with notice he could call on 28 ships of the line. The French fleet had suffered a series of setbacks in the early years of the war: in addition to the losses at Groix, seven ships had been lost at the Glorious First of June in 1795 and more were wrecked during the failed Croisière du Grand Hiver operation of 1795 and the Expédition d'Irlande in 1796. To replenish these losses, the French Navy was building new ships at its major fleet bases and in April 1798 a ship had been commissioned at Lorient: Hercule, a 74-gun ship of 1,876 tons burthen launched in July 1797. Commanded by the experienced Ship-of-the-line Captain Louis Lhéritier, a veteran of the Glorious First of June, she had a crew of 680 men, 20 short of a full complement.

== Pursuit ==
On 20 April Lhéritier was ordered to take Hercule on her maiden voyage, the short journey northwest along the coast to join the main fleet under Vice-Admiral Morard de Galles at Brest, where the crew would be augmented to reach the full complement. On board were surplus naval supplies, including a full set of rigging for a ship of the line, from the destroyed ship Quatorze Juillet which had caught fire at Lorient earlier in the month. Lhéritier's crew were inexperienced and he did not intend to seek action, remaining close to the coastline during the first day of the journey. As his ship crossed Audierne Bay between Point Penmarc'h and the Pointe du Raz however sails were sighted to the northwest.

These sails belonged to three ships of Bridport's fleet. At 11:00 on 21 April the British fleet had been cruising in the Iroise Passage when two sails were sighted approximately 12 nautical miles (22 km) to the east. Bridport ordered his three most easterly ships to detach and investigate the sails: the 74-gun ships of the line HMS Mars under Captain Alexander Hood, HMS Ramillies under Captain Henry Inman and the 38-gun frigate HMS Jason under Captain Charles Stirling. The strong winds favoured the large ships of the line as they pursued the strange sails, which were identified as French, until at 14:00 they were pulling abreast of them when a third sail was sighted about 15 nautical miles (28 km) to the southeast, sailing close to the shore.

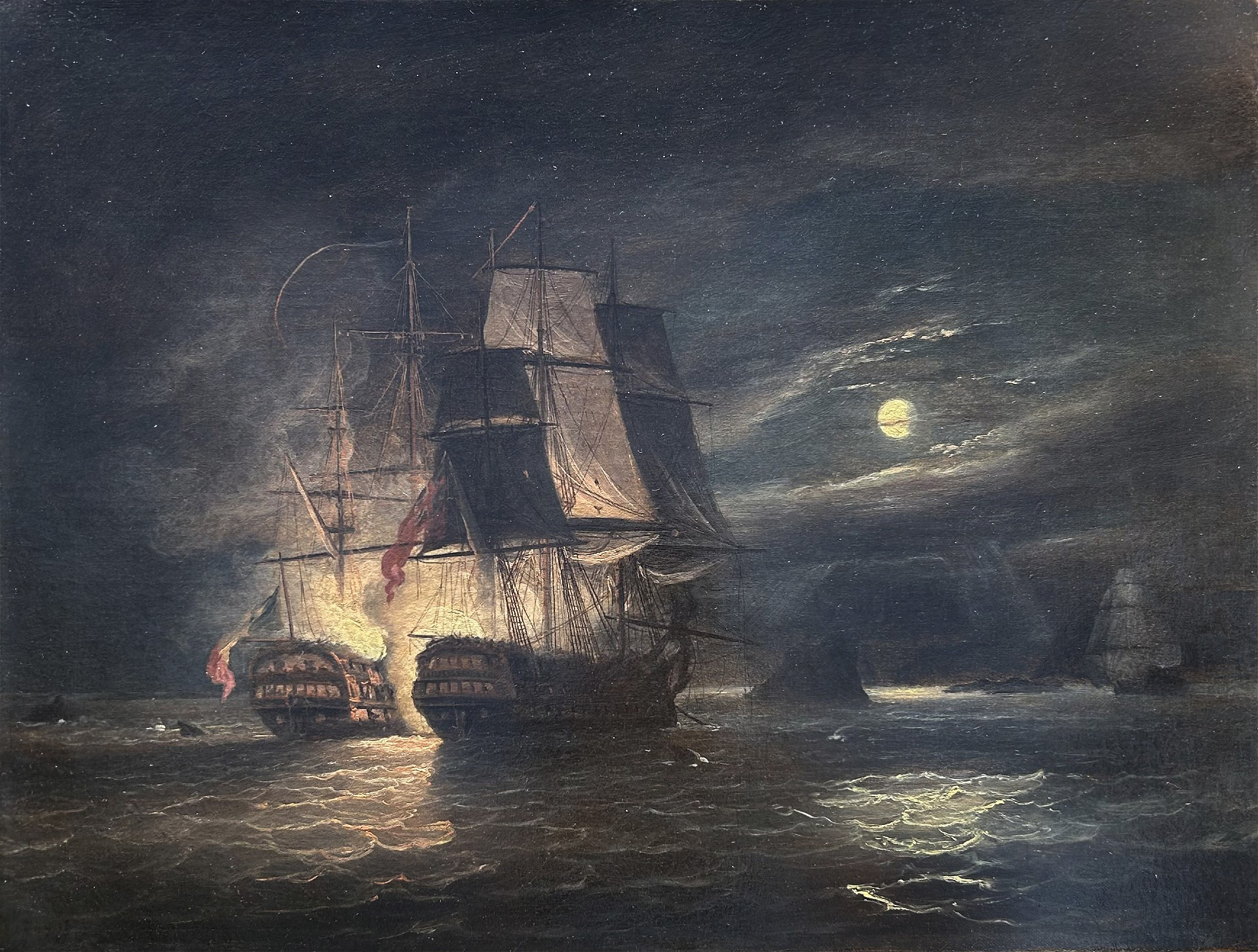
Painting of the battle by Thomas Luny

This new sail was much larger than the others sighted earlier in the day, and the detached squadron abandoned their former pursuit and turned towards the new arrival, Hercule. By 17:45, Lhéritier was in full flight with the British force strung out behind him, the rest of Bridport's fleet far to the west. Jason had the lead with Mars shortly behind, although Inman on Ramillies had lost his fore topmast and had dropped back. Hood, an experienced officer and a nephew of both Bridport and the veteran Admiral Lord Hood, pressed his ship forwards and gradually gained on both Jason and Hercule. Lhéritier knew that in open water he would be caught and overwhelmed, and sought instead to escape through the narrow and dangerous channel of the Raz de Sein, a rocky passage between the Île de Sein and the Pointe du Raz: during the Expédition d'Irlande the French ship of the line Séduisant had been wrecked in the Raz de Sein with 680 lives.

As Hercule approached the channel, Hood put Mars on the starboard tack, overtaking Jason and bearing down on the French ship. At 20:30, Lhéritier recognised that the current was too strong for Hercule to successfully navigate the Raz de Sein and instead anchored at the mouth of the channel with a spring on his cable, a system of attaching the bow anchor that increased stability and allowed Lhéritier to swing his broadside to face the enemy while stationary, roughly 2 nautical miles (3.7 km) southwest of Pointe de Raz and about 21 nautical miles (39 km) from his destination at Brest.

== Battle ==
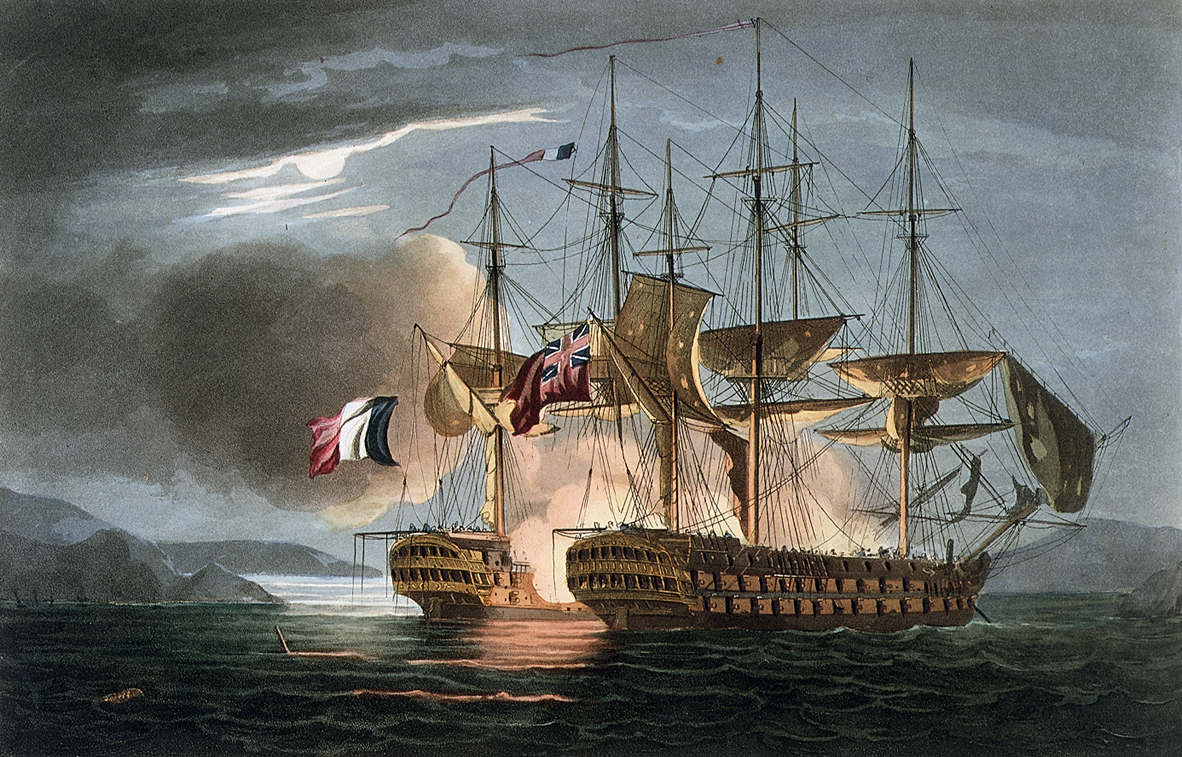
Engraving of Hercule and Mars in close combat

At 20:45, with Jason far behind in the darkness, Mars hauled up and Hood attempted to manoeuvre into an effective position from which to attack the waiting Hercule. The vagaries of the current in the Raz de Sein passage prevented Hood from handling his ship effectively however and instead he resolved on bringing Mars directly alongside and fighting broadside to broadside. At 21:15 Mars was in range and Lhéritier opened fire, Hood replying immediately. For ten minutes, the masts and rigging of Mars came under fire, with damage to the bowsprit and foremast, as Hood continued to attempt to hold his firing position against the current before pulling slightly ahead of Hercule at 21:25 and dropping anchor. The port bow anchor became entangled with the starboard anchor on Hercule and the British ship was swung violently into the French ship, the force of the collision unhinging four of the gunports on Mars.

Thus locked together, both captains ordered their ships to pour fire into the other. So closely aligned were they that many cannon on both ships could not be run out, and instead had to be fired from inside the ships. The heat from this sustained bombardment was so intense that the wood began to blacken and burn as heavy roundshot smashed gaping holes in the sides of each ship: during the combat the ragged holes torn in the side of Hercule were so extensive that the planking between the gunports was torn away, leaving wide scars along the ship's sides. Casualties were heavy on both sides: 20 minutes after the action began a musket ball struck Hood in the thigh, severing his femoral artery. Fatally wounded and bleeding profusely, Hood was carried below and command passed to Lieutenant William Butterfield. The French casualties were significantly higher than the British, a result of the much higher rate of fire achieved by Hood's well-trained crew.

Aware that his ship was suffering the worst of the casualties, Lhéritier ordered his men to attempt to board the British ship of the line, but first one and then another attempt to do so was driven back with heavy casualties. The lighting of Hercule had gone out at the beginning of the engagement, leaving her crew confused, and as a result, only around 40 men answered when Lhéritier ordered the boarding; he was himself injured twice, to the head by a sabre and to the thigh by a pike, while leading the assault. At 10:30, after an hour of continual bombardment Lhéritier surrendered: Hercule's hull had been torn open, five guns were dismounted with others damaged and more than two fifths of the crew killed or wounded. Jason was approaching fast and the rest of Bridport's fleet was close enough to see the muzzle flashes from the battle.

== Aftermath ==
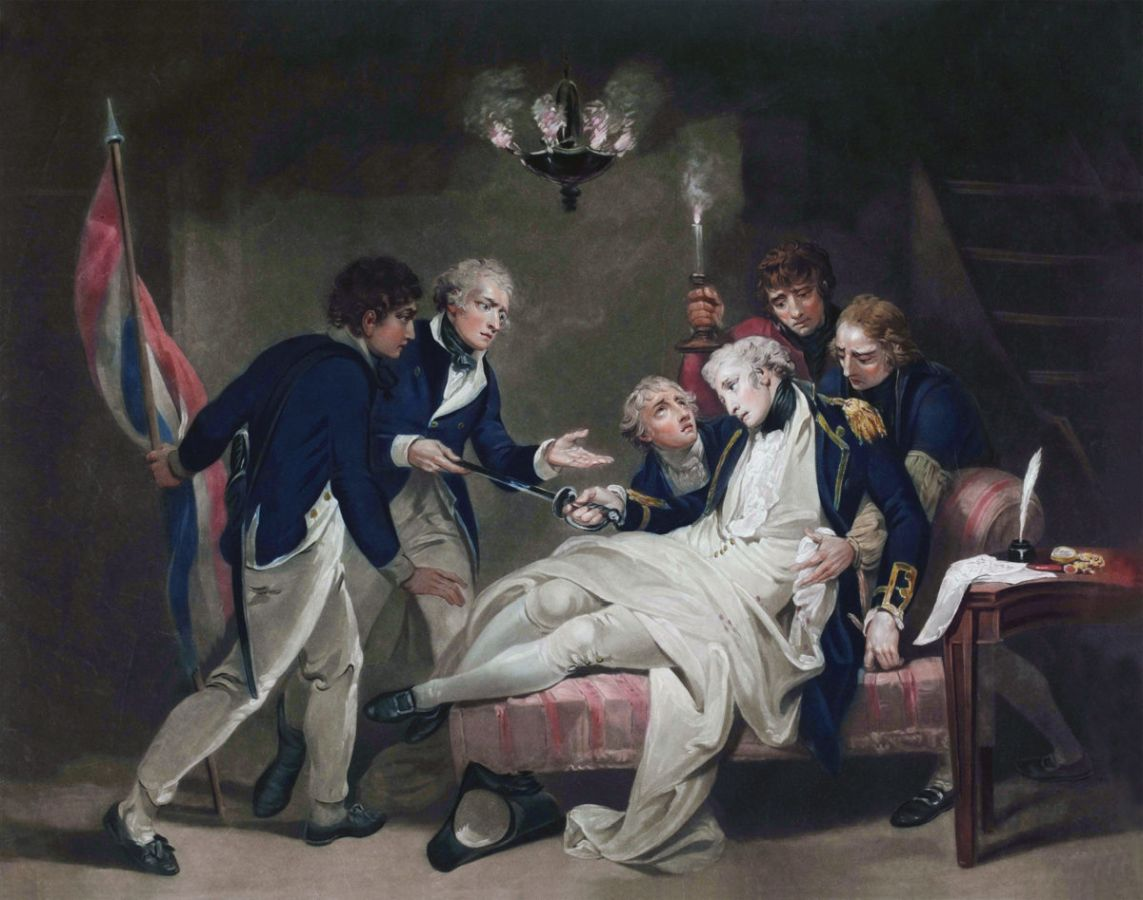
A dying Hood being presented with Lhéritier's sword

Lhéritier submitted his sword to Butterfield in surrender and it was presented to the dying Hood, who accepted it before expiring. At 22:50 Jason arrived and Stirling took charge of removing prisoners from Hercule and began the long process of extricating the two battered ships of the line from the dangerous Raz de Sein channel. Losses on the French ship were not accurately recorded in the aftermath of the action, but some accounts suggested they were as high as 400 although a more realistic estimate of 290 casualties was made by the surviving French officers. British losses amounted to three officers and 19 men killed, eight men missing (believed to have drowned after falling overboard resisting Lhéritier's boarding attempts) and another 60 wounded. The weather was fortunately calm, as neither Mars nor Hercule were in a condition to survive a storm, and with great care Hercule was brought into Plymouth on 27 April and repairs were begun with the intention of restoring the ship to active service condition. The cost of these repairs totaled £12,500 (the equivalent of £1,388,800 as of 2025), but HMS Hercule was ultimately commissioned into the Royal Navy and served until 1810.

Historian Robert Gardiner has noted that this "classic fight" was unusual in being fought between two single ships of the line of equal force and size without an external influence, and Edward Pelham Brenton wrote in 1823 that "The meeting of two ships of the line is a circumstance of rare occurrence, and its decision in our favour a brilliant ornament to our naval history": he could only identify three other such incidents in British naval history. Examination of the relative size and strength of the combatants shows that they were well-matched: the respective broadside weights were 984 lbs on Mars to 985 lbs on Hercule; Hercules at 1,876 tons burthen measured only 34 tons more than Mars, and Hercule's understrength crew of 680 was still 46 more than on board Mars and the British crew had also been active during the Spithead Mutiny in 1797, during which Hood had been temporarily deposed as captain. Both were relatively new ships, Hercule only 24 hours at sea while Mars was the nameship of the 1794 Mars class built at the start of the French Revolutionary Wars. In summary, historian William James indicates that the greater experience of Hood's crew and the nearby presence of other British ships gave Mars a slight advantage, but that "the action of the Mars and Hercule was one that, in the conduct of it throughout, reflected about an equal share of credit upon both the contending parties."

Although some British historians claimed that Lhéritier died of his wounds in the aftermath of the action, this was not the case; upon his return to France after being exchanged, Lhéritier faced a court-martial for the loss of his ship and was honourably acquitted and received a letter of praising his resistance from the French Minister of the Navy and the Colonies, Counter-admiral Étienne Eustache Bruix. In Britain, Butterfield was promoted to commander, and Hood was posthumously commended, Bridport writing in his official dispatch that "No Praise of mine can add one Ray of Brilliancy to the distinguished Valour of Captain Alexander Hood". His body was returned to England and buried near his home in Butleigh, Somerset under a monument provided by his family.

== Notes ==
1. Note A:The other incidents identified by Brenton were the action of 13 August 1761 when HMS Bellona captured Courageux, the action of 21 April 1782 when HMS Foudroyant captured Pégase and the action of 22 February 1812 when HMS Victorious captured Rivoli.

== Bibliography ==
- Brenton, Edward Pelham (1837) [1825]. The Naval History of Great Britain, Vol. II. London: C. Rice. p. 387. "hercule mars Brenton."
- Clowes, William Laird (1997) [1900]. The Royal Navy, A History from the Earliest Times to 1900, Volume IV. London: Chatham Publishing. ISBN 1-86176-013-2.
- James, William (2002) [1827]. The Naval History of Great Britain, Volume 2, 1797–1799. London: Conway Maritime Press. ISBN 0-85177-906-9.
- Lavery, Brian (1983). The Ship of the Line - Volume 1: The Development of the Battlefleet 1650–1850. London: Conway Maritime Press. ISBN 0-85177-252-8.
- Woodman, Richard (2001). The Sea Warriors. London: Constable Publishers. ISBN 1-84119-183-3.
- Troude, Onésime-Joachim (1867). Batailles navales de la France. Vol. 3. Paris: Challamel ainé. pp. 125–127.
- Quintin, Danielle et Bernard (2003). Dictionnaire des capitaines de Vaisseau de Napoléon. Paris: S.P.M. pp. 242–243. ISBN 2-901952-42-9.
