= Matthew Gardiner (minister) =

Scottish minister

Matthew Gardiner (1776–1865) was a Scottish minister who rose to be head of the Church of Scotland in 1837 and died as Father of the Church.

== Life ==
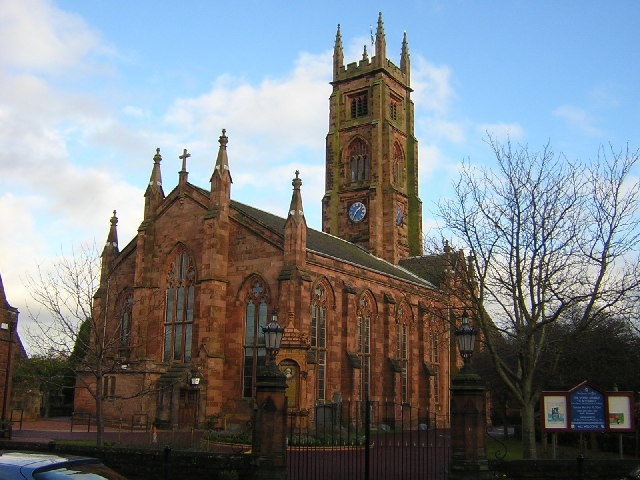
Bothwell Parish Church

He was born in Glasgow on 18 August 1776 the eldest son of James Gardiner. He was educated at Glasgow Grammar School. He then studied at Glasgow University where he graduated MA in 1793 aged 17. In May 1798 he was licensed to preach as a Church of Scotland minister by the Presbytery of Hamilton.

In April 1802 he was ordained as minister of Bothwell under the patronage of Archibald, Duke of Hamilton. In 1831 Glasgow University awarded him a Doctor of Divinity.

In 1837 he succeeded Norman Macleod as Moderator of the General Assembly. He was succeeded in turn by William Muir. In his election he won by 262 votes to 59 against John Lee.

He died on 4 June 1865 at Bothwell and with the status of Father of the Church.

== Family ==
In August 1808 aged 32 he married Sarah Forrest daughter of John Forrest an Edinburgh merchant, and sister of Sir James Forrest, 1st Baronet. They had several children:

- Elizabeth (b.1810)
- James Gardiner WS (1811–1879) Sheriff of Campbeltown
- Rebecca (1812–1820)
- John Gardiner (1815–1877) advocate
- Marion Aikman (b.1817) died in infancy
- Elizabeth (1811–1881) married Rev John Heyliger Dewhurst (1809–1875)

== Publications ==
- The Folly and Danger of Departing from the Living God (1820)
- Statistical Account of the Parish of Bothwell 1845

== Artistic recognition ==
A poem "On the Death of Matthew Gardiner DD" was composed by Janet Hamilton
