= Loss of the Royal George =

Painting by John Christian Schetky

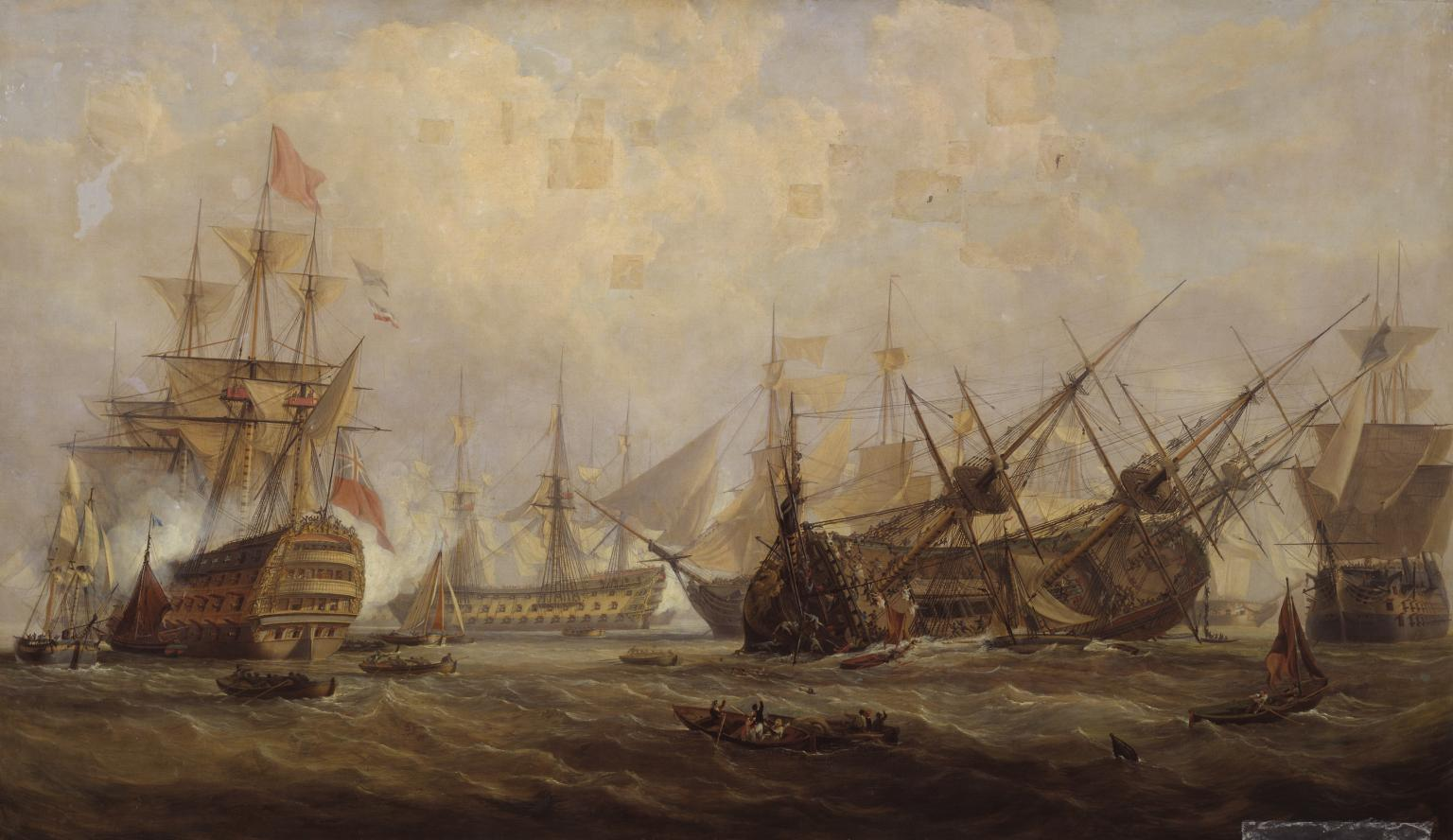
- Artist: John Christian Schetky
- Year: 1840
- Type: Oil on canvas, maritime painting
- Dimensions: 106 cm × 182.9 cm (42 in × 72.0 in)
- Location: Tate Britain, London

Loss of the Royal George is an 1840 oil painting by the British artist John Christian Schetky. A historical maritime painting, it depicts the sinking of the Royal Navy ship of the line HMS Royal George at Spithead off Portsmouth. It took place on 29 August 1782 during the final year of the American Revolutionary War, when the ship was careened it capsized with the loss of over eight hundred people.

The work was displayed at the Royal Academy Exhibition of 1840 at the National Gallery. The painting is in the collection of the Tate Britain in Pimlico, having been donated in 1885.

== Bibliography ==
- Jamieson, Alan G. Out of the Depths: A History of Shipwrecks. Reaktion Books, 2024.
- Tracy, Nicholas. Britannia’s Palette: The Arts of Naval Victory. McGill-Queen's Press, 2007.
