= Alexander Hood (Royal Navy officer, born 1758) =

Royal Navy officer (1758–1798)

Captain Alexander Hood
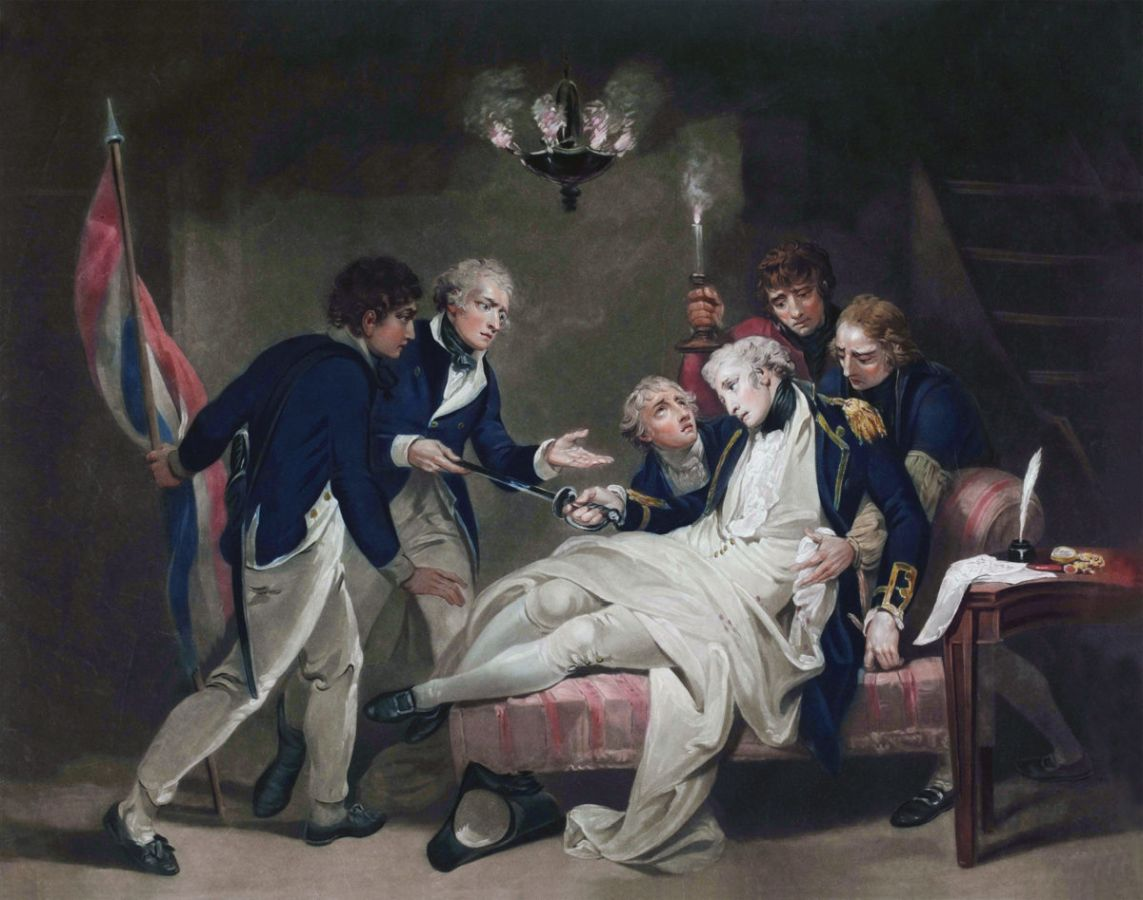
- Painting of a dying Hood (centre-right, seated) by Henry Singleton
- Born: 23 April 1758; Mosterton, Dorset
- Died: 21 April 1798 (aged 39); Onboard the HMS Mars, Raz de Sein
- Military career
- Allegiance: Great Britain
- Branch: Royal Navy
- Service years: 1767–1798
- Rank: Captain
- Commands: HMS Barfleur; HMS Champion; HMS Mars
- Conflicts: American War of Independence; French Revolutionary Wars

Captain Alexander Hood (23 April 1758 – 21 April 1798) was a Royal Navy officer who served in the American War of Independence and French Revolutionary Wars. He was one of several members of the Hood family to serve at sea, including his brother Samuel, who were both sponsored into the Royal Navy by their cousins once removed, Lord Hood and Alexander Hood.

== Career ==
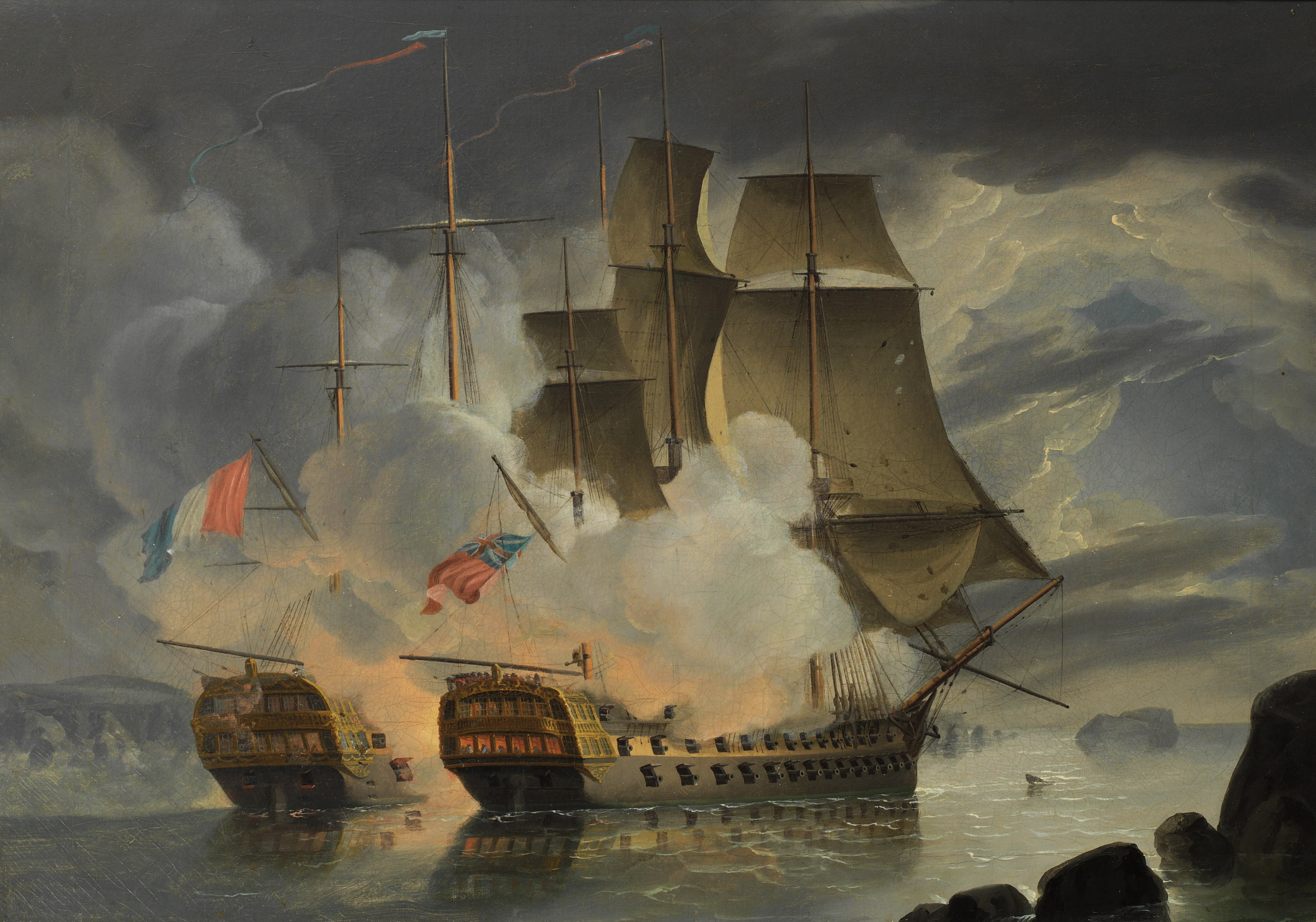
HMS Mars (right) under Hood at the Battle of the Raz de Sein

He entered the Royal Navy in 1767, and accompanied Captain James Cook in his second voyage of exploration from 1772 to 1775. (Note: As a midshipman on Resolution) (Note: Hood had an island named after him – Hood's Island, now Fatu Huku in the Marquesas Islands) During the American War of Independence, (Note: Promoted: Lieutenant July 1777; Commander May 1781; Post captain July 1781) under Admirals Richard Howe and George Rodney, when he had command of the cutter Ranger in March 1780, he distinguished himself in the West Indies, and in July 1781 at the age of 23 he was promoted to captain. Shortly thereafter, he was given command of the 98-gun second rate ship of the line, HMS Barfleur. It was not uncommon for an extremely junior captain to find himself commanding a large ship-of-the-line, if that ship were the flagship of an experienced admiral, who would be able to keep a close eye on the new captain. In this case, the Barfleur was the flagship of his cousin, Admiral Sir Samuel Hood. On 5 September, they took the Barfleur into battle at the Battle of the Chesapeake, where the ship served as flagship of the van of Sir Thomas Graves' fleet.

At the Battle of the Saintes on 12 April 1782, Hood was in command of one of Rodney's frigates, HMS Champion. Later, again under his cousin's command, he proceeded to the Mona Passage, where he captured the French corvette Cérès, a former British warship that the Navy took into service as HMS Raven. Hood became close friends with the commander of his prize, the Baron de Peroy, and during the peace of 1783–1792 (Note: 1790–1793: Commanded frigate Hebe. Assigned to Channel Fleet.) paid a long visit to France as his former prisoner's guest. He married Elizabeth Periam on 11 July 1792; their son was Sir Alexander Hood, 2nd Baronet.

In the early part of the French Revolutionary Wars, ill health kept him at home, (Note: 1794. Briefly commanded frigate Audacious.) and it was not until 1797 that he went to sea again. His first experience was bitter: his ship, the 74-gun third-rate Mars, was unenviably prominent in the Spithead mutiny.

On 21 April 1798, Mars fought the Battle of the Raz de Sein with the French ship Hercule in the dusk near the Pointe du Raz on the coast of Brittany. Hercule attempted to escape through the Passage du Raz but the tide was running in the wrong direction and she was forced to anchor, giving Hood the chance to attack at close quarters. The two ships were of equal force, both seventy-fours, but Hercule was newly commissioned; after more than an hour and a half of bloody fighting at close quarters she struck her flag, having lost over three hundred men. On Mars 31 men were killed and 60 wounded. Among the dead was Captain Hood, mortally wounded in the thigh – he had been cut in the femoral artery. He is said to have died just as the sword of the French captain Louis Lhéritier was being put in his hand.

Hood has a house named after him at The Royal Hospital School, Suffolk.

== See also ==
- His brother, Admiral Sir Samuel Hood (1762–1814)
- His cousin once removed, Admiral Samuel Hood, 1st Viscount Hood (1724–1816)
- His cousin once removed, Admiral Alexander Hood, 1st Viscount Bridport (1726–1814)
- His grandson Admiral Lord Hood (1824–1901)
