= Henrietta A. Duff =

- Born: January 1842
- Died: November 14, 1879; Brighton
- Occupations: Poet, editor, novelist
- Parents: Norwich Duff (father); Helen Mary Shoolbred (mother)

Henrietta Anne Duff (January 5, 1842 – November 14, 1879) was a British novelist, poet, and magazine editor.

Henrietta Anne Duff was born in January 1842. She was the daughter of Vice Admiral Norwich Duff and Helen Mary Shoolbred.

Her novel Virginia: A Roman Sketch (1877) was a romance about an English sculptor. She also served as editor of The Powder Magazine. Her other works, a novel, a collection of stories, and a volume of poetry, were published posthumously.

Henrietta Anne Duff was a lifelong invalid and died of heart disease on 14 November 1879 in Brighton.

== Bibliography ==
- Virginia: A Roman Sketch. 1 vol. London: Bentley, 1877.
- Fragments of Verse. London: Marcus Ward & Co., 1880.
- Honor Carmichael: A Study. 2 vol. London: Bentley, 1880.
- My Imperialist Neighbour, and Other Stories. 1 vol. London: Marcus Ward, 1880.
