= Janet Hamilton =

Scottish poet and writer

- Born: Janet Thomson; 14 October 1795; Carshill, Shotts, Lanarkshire, Scotland
- Died: 30 October 1873 (aged 78)
- Resting place: Old Monklands Cemetery, Coatbridge

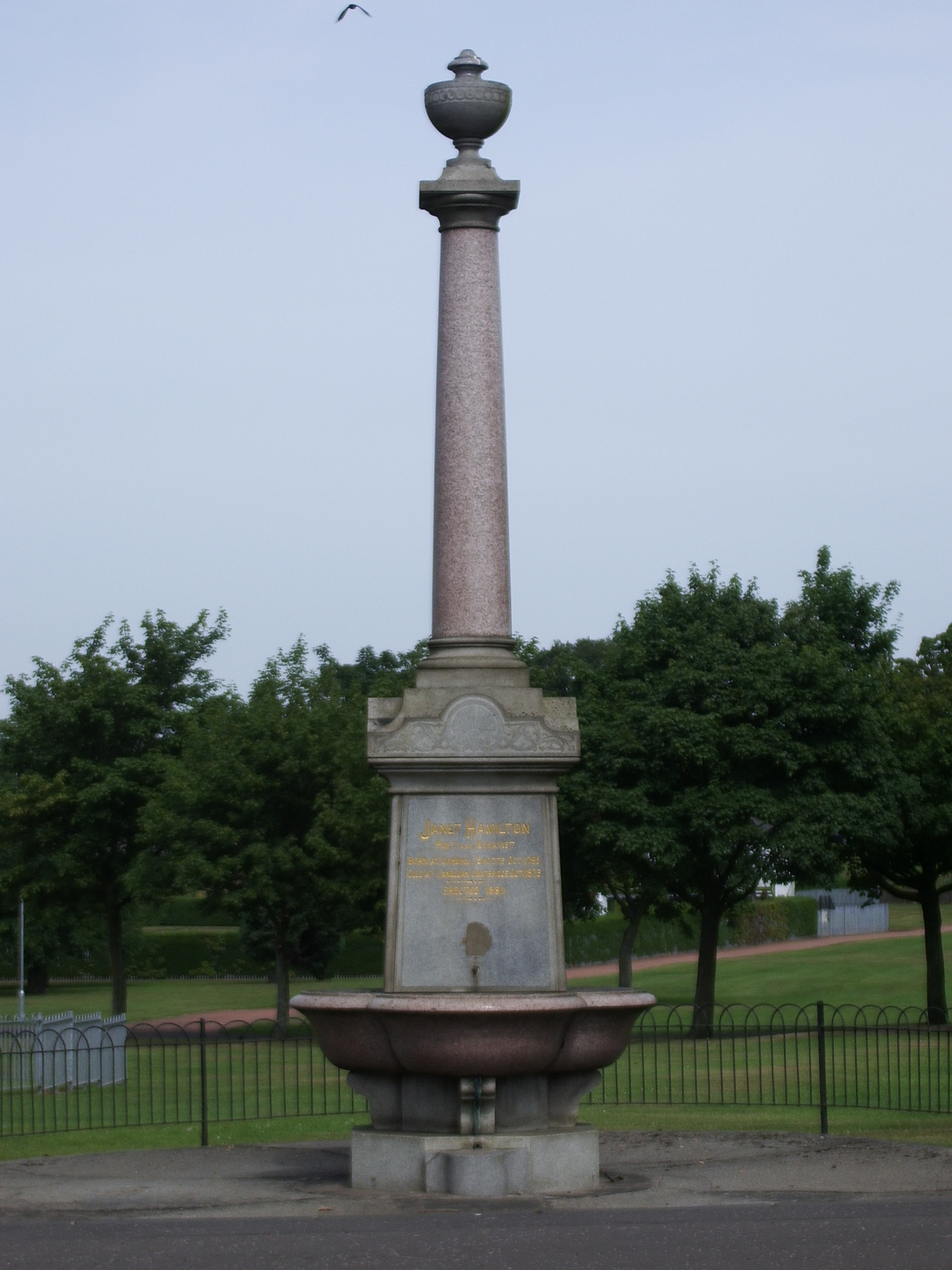
Janet Hamilton Memorial Fountain, West End Park, Coatbridge

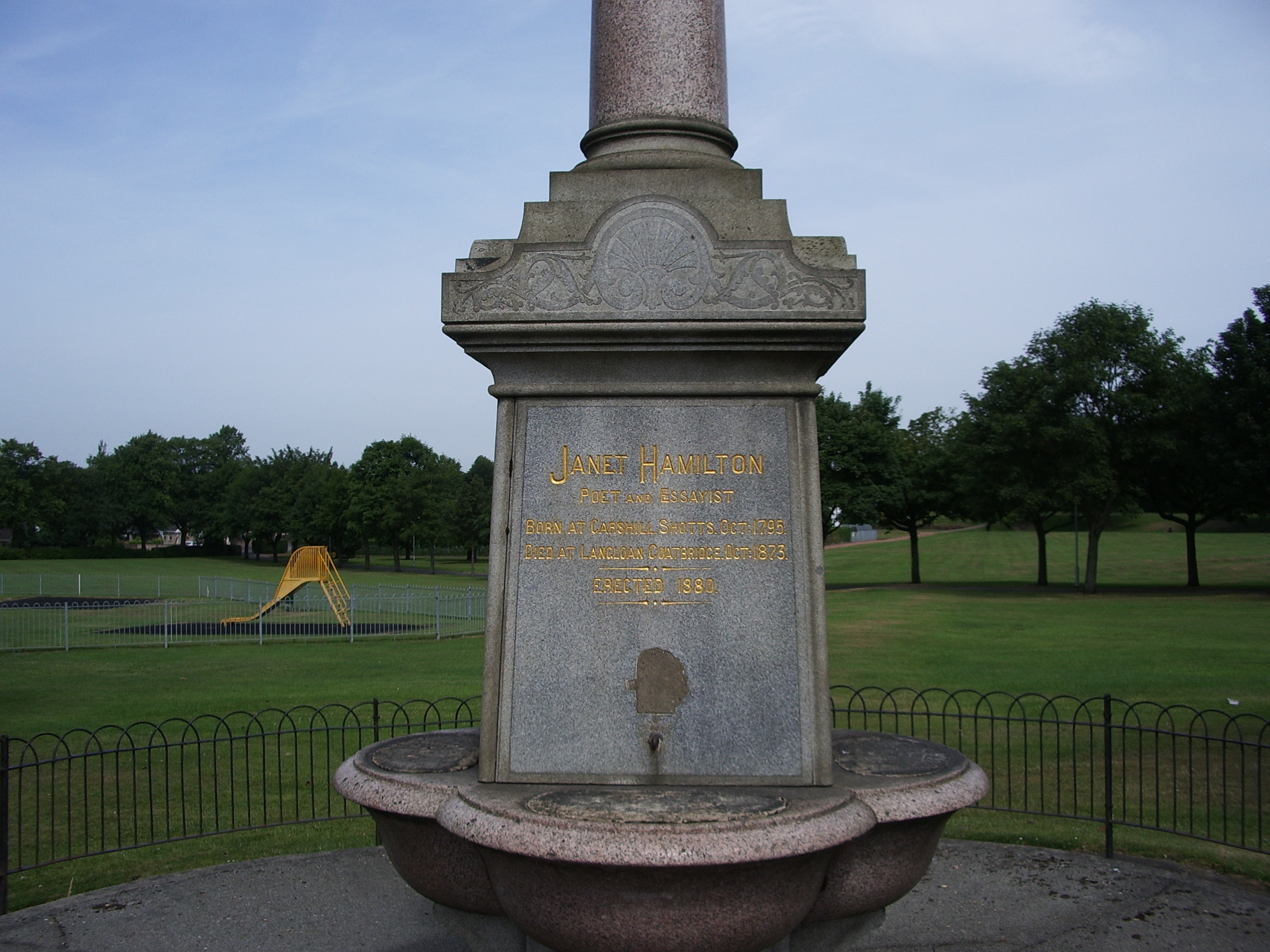
Janet Hamilton Memorial Fountain, West End Park, Coatbridge

Janet Hamilton (12 October 1795 – 30 October 1873) was a nineteenth-century Scottish poet.

== Life ==
Janet was born as Janet Thomson at Carshill, Shotts parish, Lanarkshire on October 14, 1795, the daughter of a shoemaker (James Thomson) and Mary Thomson (née Brownlee). She was a descendant of John Whitelaw, the forfeited covenanter from Shotts. At the age of three her family moved to Hamilton, and then to Langloan, in the parish of Old Monkland, Lanarkshire at the age of seven. For a time her parents became farm labourers, and she span and worked at the tambour-frame. Her father at length settled down in business for himself as a shoemaker, and John Hamilton, one of his young workmen, married Janet in 1809 in High Street, Glasgow, when Janet was thirteen. They lived together at Langloan for about sixty years, and had a family of ten children, seven sons and three daughters, all of whom she taught to read, starting with the alphabet.

Having learned to read as a girl, she became familiar with the Bible, with Shakespeare and Milton, with many standard histories, biographies, and essays, and with the poems of Allan Ramsay, Robert Fergusson and Robert Burns. Before she was twenty years old, she had written numerous verses on religious themes, but family cares prevented further composition until she was about fifty-four. Then she began to write essays for a supplement to Cassell's Working Man's Friend, as well as poems in English and Scots and reminiscences of village and rural Scotland during her youth.

During the last 18 years of her life she was blind, and her husband and one of her daughters, Marion (28 January 1824 - 28 February 1900), read to her. A son, James (12 August 1814 - 5 November 1882), served as her amanuensis. She died on 30 October 1873, aged 78, having never been "more than twenty miles from her dwelling". A large crowd of people attended her funeral, and a memorial fountain has been placed nearly opposite her cottage. She was buried in Old Monklands Cemetery in Coatbridge. Also on her tombstone is her husband James, her sons James and Archibald (27 June 1810 – 6 June 1890), and Marion with Janet's grandson through Marion, George Hamilton (19 March 1875 – 1939).

== Works ==
- Poems and essays of a miscellaneous character on subjects of general interest. 1863 Glasgow
- Poems of purpose and sketches in prose of Scottish peasant life and character in auld lang syne, sketches of local scenes and characters : with a glossary 1865. Glasgow.
- Poems and Ballads. With introductory papers by G. Gilfillan and A. Wallace. 1868. Glasgow
- Poems, essays, and sketches. 1870. Glasgow A compilation of the best of the 1863 and 1865 poetry books.
- Pictures in Prose and Verse; or, Personal recollections of the late Janet Hamilton .. together with several hitherto unpublished poetic pieces. 1877. Edited by John Young. Glasgow.
- On the Death of Matthew Gardiner DD (1865)

== Sources ==
- Pictures in Prose and Verse; or, Personal recollections of the late Janet Hamilton .. together with several hitherto unpublished poetic pieces. 1877. Glasgow. Pages 1–41
- Poems, sketches and essays. 1880. Glasgow. Introduction to Janet Hamilton's life and character by Rev. George Gilfillan.
- Janet Hamilton. and other papers. By Joseph Wright. 1889 Edinburgh
- Wilson, James Grant. Poets and Poetry of Scotland. Volume 2 1876 Pages 149-151.
- Murdoch, Alexander G. Recent and Living Scottish Poets. 1883 Pages 334-337.
- Eyre-Todd, George. Glasgow poets. 1903 Pages 224-233.
- Edwards, D. H. One Hundred Modern Scottish Poets. 1880 Pages 248-259
- Boos, Florence. Memoirs of Victorian Working-Class Women: The Hard Way Up. Palgrave, 2017. Chapter 4 is devoted to Hamilton's "Sketches of Village Life."
- Boos, Florence S., ed. Working-Class Women Poets in Victorian Britain: An Anthology. Broadview Press, 2008. This contains a selection of Hamilton poems in Scots and English with glosses and biographical materials.
