= Alexander Dirom =

British Army general

Lieutenant-General Alexander Dirom FRS FRSE
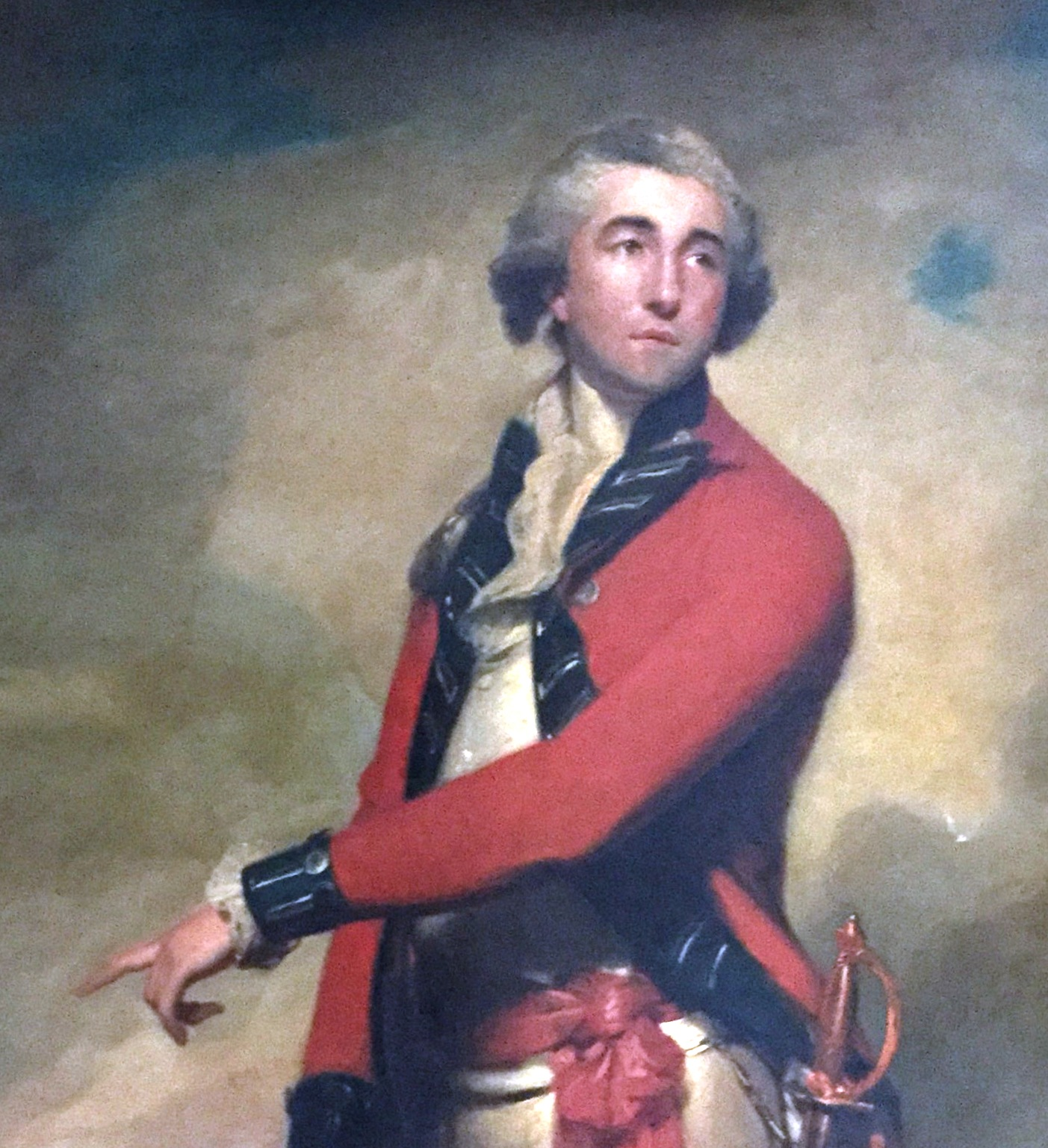
- Portrait of Dirom, c. 1820
- Born: 21 May 1757; Banffshire, Scotland
- Died: 6 October 1830 (aged 73) Annan, Dumfriesshire, Scotland

Lieutenant-General Alexander Dirom of Luce and Mount Annan FRS FRSE (21 May 1757 – 6 October 1830) was a British Army officer who saw overseas service in Barbados, Jamaica and India. He is remembered not only as a military commander but also as an agricultural improver, which earned him Fellowship of both the Royal Society of London and the Royal Society of Edinburgh. His most notable contribution was to identify the importance of salt in animal diets, leading to the widespread use of "salt-licks" from around 1800. His views on the British corn trade also paved the way to the formulation of the Corn Laws in the early 19th century.

== Biography ==
He was born in Banffshire the son of Alexander Dirom of Muiresk (Provost of Banff) and his wife, Ann Fotheringham.

He was appointed ensign in the 61st Regiment of Foot on 8 December 1778 and lieutenant in the 88th Foot 13 October 1779. He served with the regiment in Barbados (1780) and Jamaica (1780–84) as Military Secretary to the GoC and Major of Brigade. He exchanged into the 60th (Royal American) Regiment of Foot, later the Kings Royal Rifle Corps, as a captain in 1781 and in 1783 went to St Domingo to negotiate an exchange of prisoners of war. In 1784 he returned to England. He was aide-de-camp to Major General Sir Archibald Campbell (Gov. Gen. and Commander in Chief at Madras) and subsequently served in India against Tippoo Sahib in the Third Mysore War.

In 1795 he was elected a Fellow Royal Society and in 1796 a Fellow of the Royal Society of Edinburgh. His proposers for the latter were Henry Mackenzie, John Playfair, and James Finlayson.

He died in Annan on 6 October 1830.

== Publications ==
- Narrative of the Campaign in India (1794)
- An Inquiry into the Corn Laws and Corn Trade of Great Britain (1796)
- Plans for the Defence of Great Britain and Ireland (1797)
- On the Rev Robert Rennie's Plan for an Inland Village
- Descriptions of the Limekilns built in 1801
- On Experiments with Salt as Manure and in the Feeding of Livestock
- Remarks on Free Trade and the State of the British Empire (1827)

== Family ==
He was brother of Sophia Dirom who married Captain George Duff RN (killed at the Battle of Trafalgar).

Dirom married the wealthy Magdalen Passley (1772–1853) of Mount Annan in Dumfriesshire, in Edinburgh on 3 August 1793 and thereafter adopted the title Dirom of Mount Annan. They had 12 recorded children including sons: Lt John Pasley Dirom, Sophia Dirom, Captain Alexander Dirom, Robert Dirom, Andrew Dirom, William Maxwell Dirom, Francis Moira Dirom and Admiral James Dirom.

Their daughter, Leonora Anne Dirom, married William Muir. Other daughters included Magdalen Jemima Dirom and Sophia Dirom.

== Artistic recognition ==
There is a "school of Raeburn" 3/4 length portrait, supposedly of him, which has Dirom's face painted onto an ensign in the red uniform of a regiment to which Dirom never belonged.
