= HMS Glenmore =

Two vessels of the Royal Navy have been named HMS Glenmore:

- HMS Glenmore (1796) was a 36-gun Amazon-class frigate launched in 1796 and sold in 1814.
- HMS Glenmore (1939) was the paddle steamer Glen Gower, launched in 1922. She was hired as a minesweeper in 1939, became an anti aircraft ship in 1942, and was used as an accommodation ship between 1945 and 1947.
