= John Alexander Schetky =

Scottish painter (1785–1824)

- Born: 1785; Edinburgh
- Died: 5 September 1824 (aged 38–39)
- Occupation: Amateur watercolour painter

John Alexander Schetky (1785 – 5 September 1824) was a Scottish amateur watercolour painter.

== Biography ==
Schetky was the son of Johann Georg Christoph Schetky, and a younger brother of John Christian Schetky. He was born in Edinburgh in 1785. He was educated for the medical profession, and in October 1804 was appointed assistant-surgeon in the 3rd dragoon guards, with which regiment he served in Portugal under Lord Beresford. In August 1812 he was promoted to the rank of surgeon on the Portuguese staff, but at the close of the Peninsular war he returned to Edinburgh, and resumed the study of drawing in the Trustees' school. During his service in Portugal he sent home some clever sketches made in the Pyrenees, one of which, ‘Celerico,’ was in 1811 in the exhibition of the Associated Painters in Watercolours, of which he had become a member. In 1816 and 1817 he exhibited at the Society of Painters in Watercolours four views in Spain and Portugal, and in 1821 he sent to the Royal Academy an oil-painting, ‘Recollection of the Serra da Estrella, Portugal.’ He afterwards held an appointment in the General Hospital at Fort Pitt, Chatham, and while there he made many drawings for the Museum of Morbid Anatomy. In August 1823 he was promoted to be deputy inspector of hospitals on the West Coast of Africa, and accepted the post in the hope of being able during his five years' service to explore the region visited by Mungo Park. He was, however, attacked by fever while on a voyage from Sierra Leone to Cape Coast Castle, and died almost immediately after reaching there on 5 September 1824. Two pictures representing actions of the Brune frigate, painted by him in conjunction with his brother John Christian Schetky, were exhibited at the Royal Academy in 1825.
