= USS LeHardy =

Evarts-class destroyer escort

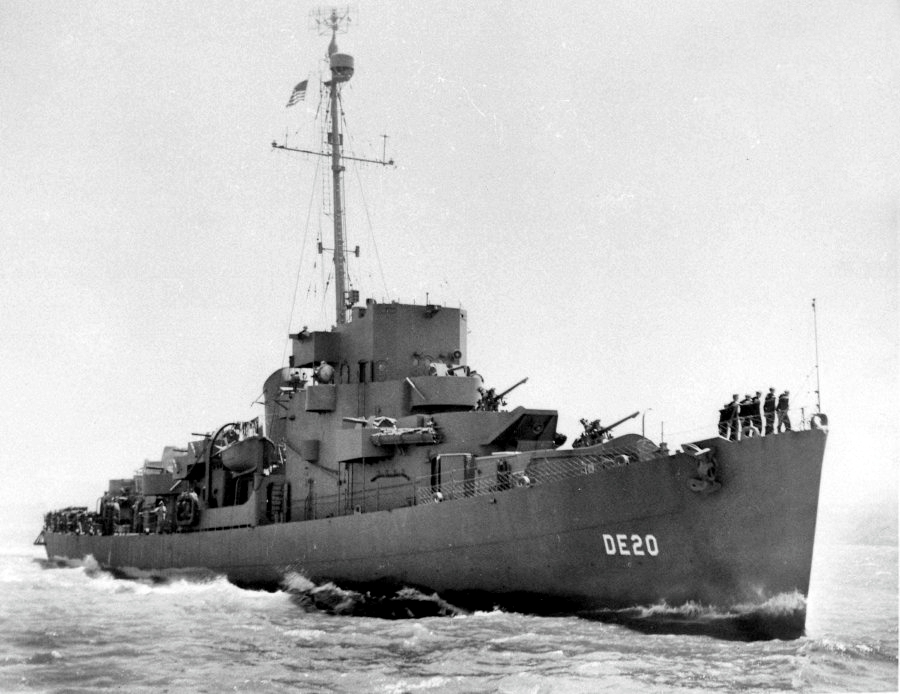
- Lehardy underway off Mare Island on 7 May 1943

History

United States
- Name: USS LeHardy
- Builder: Mare Island Navy Yard
- Laid down: 15 April 1942
- Launched: 21 November 1942, as HMS Duff (BDE-20)
- Commissioned: 15 May 1943
- Decommissioned: 25 October 1945
- Renamed: USS LeHardy, 19 February 1943
- Stricken: 13 November 1945
- Honors and awards: 2 battle stars (World War II)
- Fate: Sold for scrapping, 26 December 1946

General characteristics
- Type: Evarts-class destroyer escort
- Displacement: 1,140 long tons (1,158 t) standard; 1,430 long tons (1,453 t) full
- Length: 289 ft 5 in (88.21 m) o/a; 283 ft 6 in (86.41 m) w/l
- Beam: 35 ft (11 m)
- Draft: 11 ft (3.4 m) (max)
- Propulsion: 4 × General Motors Model 16-278A diesel engines with electric drive, 6,000 shp (4,474 kW); 2 screws
- Speed: 19 knots (35 km/h; 22 mph)
- Range: 4,150 nmi (7,690 km)
- Complement: 15 officers and 183 enlisted
- Armament: 3 × single 3"/50 Mk.22 dual purpose guns; 1 × quad 1.1"/75 Mk.2 AA gun; 9 × 20 mm Mk.4 AA guns; 1 × Hedgehog Projector Mk.10 (144 rounds); 8 × Mk.6 depth charge projectors; 2 × Mk.9 depth charge tracks

USS LeHardy (DE-20) was an Evarts-class destroyer escort constructed for the United States Navy during World War II. It was promptly sent off into the Pacific Ocean to protect convoys and other ships from Japanese submarines and fighter aircraft. At the end of the war, she had the honor of proceeding to Wake Island, as the Japanese commander surrendered, and raising a flagpole to fly the American flag once again.

She was laid down as HMS Duff (BDE-20) for the Royal Navy on 15 April 1942 by Mare Island Navy Yard; launched on 21 November 1942; sponsored by Mrs. Bert A. Barr. The ship was retained for use in the U.S. Navy and renamed LeHardy on 19 February 1943 after Marcel LeHardy, who had been killed aboard USS San Francisco during the Solomons Islands campaign. LeHardy was commissioned on 15 May 1943.

== Design ==
The Evarts-class destroyer escorts were 289 ft 5 in (88.21 m) long overall, and they had a beam of 35 ft 2 in (10.72 m). They had an average draft of 10 ft 1 in (3.07 m) at their full load displacement of 1,416 long tons (1,439 t). Each ship had a normal crew numbered 156 officers and sailors.

LeHardy was propelled by a pair of diesel motors manufactured by General Motors, which drove a pair of screw propellers. Her propulsion system was rated to produce 6,000 brake horsepower (4,500 kW) for a top speed of 19.5 knots (36.1 km/h; 22.4 mph). Oil storage amounted to between 131 and 197 long tons (133 and 200 t), which allowed a cruising radius of up to 6,000 nautical miles (11,000 km; 6,900 mi) at an economical pace of 10 knots (19 km/h; 12 mph).

The ship's armament consisted of a main battery of three 3-inch (76 mm) /50-caliber guns in individual pivot mounts, which could be used against air or surface targets. These were supported by a light anti-aircraft battery that initially consisted of four 1.1 in (28 mm) /75-caliber guns in a quadruple mount and nine 20 mm (0.79 in) Oerlikon guns. For attacks against submarines, the ship was equipped with a Hedgehog mortar, eight depth charge throwers, and two depth charge racks.

== World War II Pacific Theatre operations ==
After shakedown, LeHardy was assigned to the "pineapple run", escorting convoys from the United States west coast to Pearl Harbor. She sailed on her first cruise to Hawaii on 21 July and made two additional runs with convoys before being ordered to remain at Hawaii in late October. Following training exercises, LeHardy departed Pearl Harbor on 15 November as ASW screen with a convoy en route to Tarawa. Upon arrival there 10 days later, the destroyer escort continued patrol and screening operations with the 5th Fleet in the vicinity of the Gilbert Islands. LeHardy remained off the Gilberts as the U.S. Marines ashore secured the islands, from which the Marshalls operation would be launched.

Departing Makin on 25 December, she steamed back to Hawaii for pre-invasion training in preparation for her next assignment. Sailing from Pearl Harbor again on 28 January 1944, LeHardy formed part of the escort and ASW screen for a convoy to the Marshall Islands landings. She arrived off Kwajalein on 5 February, the day the atoll was secured, then escorted the cargo ships to Funafuti, Ellice Islands. She returned to the Marshalls in mid-February for patrols and screening duties during the capture of Eniwetok, before sailing for Pearl Harbor on 4 March.

Upon her arrival on 11 March, the destroyer escort was assigned to training exercises with fleet submarines. LeHardy continued these operations until she departed Pearl Harbor late in May for ASW operations in the Marshalls. Throughout the summer, she alternated between ASW duties in the western Pacific and training exercises out of Hawaii.

== Surrender of the Japanese garrison at Wake Island ==
From 22 October 1944 until 22 January 1945, LeHardy escorted tanker convoys from Eniwetok to Ulithi, then sailed for a Seattle, Washington, overhaul. The destroyer escort returned Eniwetok on 28 May to resume her Eniwetok-Ulithi convoy runs, her task for the rest of the war. On 2 September, LeHardy departed Kwajalein to take part in the surrender ceremonies on Wake Island. Arriving there on 4 September, LeHardy stood by as the Japanese admiral surrendered the island. A detail from the ship went ashore and raised the pole which once again flew the American flag over Wake Island.

== End-of-war deactivation ==
After touching Kwajalein and Pearl Harbor, she proceeded to San Pedro, California, arriving on 27 September. LeHardy decommissioned there on 25 October 1945 and was sold 26 December 1946 to National Metal and Steel Corp., Terminal Island, California.

== Awards ==
- Combat Action Ribbon (retroactive)
- American Campaign Medal
- Asiatic–Pacific Campaign Medal (with three service stars)
- World War II Victory Medal
