= HMS Hercule =

Téméraire class ship of the line

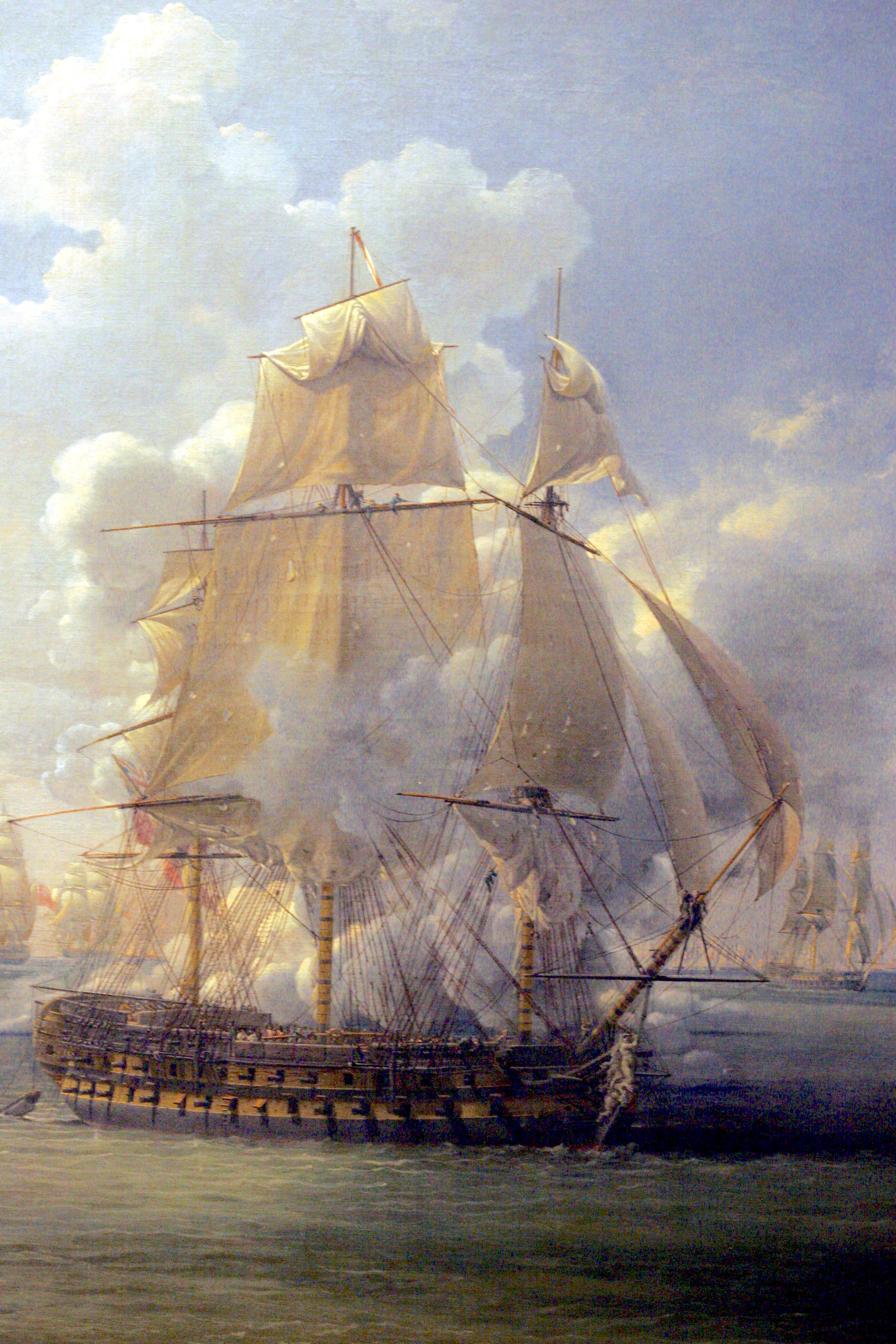
- Hercule at the action of 28 June 1803

History

France
- Name: Hercule
- Namesake: Hercules
- Ordered: 14 August 1793
- Builder: Lorient shipyard
- Laid down: June 1794
- Launched: 5 October 1797
- Completed: March 1798
- Captured: 21 April 1798

Great Britain
- Name: HMS Hercule
- Acquired: 21 April 1798
- Fate: Broken up in December 1810

General characteristics
- Class & type: Téméraire-class ship of the line
- Displacement: 3,069 tonneaux
- Tons burthen: 1,537 port tonneaux French service; 1,876 bm British service
- Length: 55.87 metres (183.3 ft) (172 pied)
- Beam: 14.90 metres (48 ft 11 in)
- Draught: 7.26 metres (23.8 ft) (22 pied)
- Propulsion: Up to 2,485 m^{2} (26,750 sq ft) of sails
- Armament: 74 guns: Lower gundeck: 28 × 36-pounder long guns; Upper gundeck: 30 × 18-pounder long guns; Forecastle and Quarter deck: 16 × 8-pounder long guns; 4 × 36-pdr carronades

HMS Hercule was a 74-gun third rate ship of the line of the Royal Navy. She was previously Hercule, a Téméraire class ship of the line of the French Navy, but was captured on her maiden voyage in 1798, and spent the rest of her career as a British ship. She was broken up in 1810.

== French career and capture ==
During her maiden journey, on 21 April 1798, and just 24 hours out of port, she was captured by the British ship HMS Mars after a violent fight at the Battle of the Raz de Sein, off Île de Sein near Brest. Hercule attempted to escape through the Passage du Raz, but the tide was running in the wrong direction, and she was forced to anchor, giving the British the chance to attack at close quarters. The two ships were of equal force, both seventy-fours, but Hercule was newly commissioned; after more than an hour and a half of bloody fighting at close quarters she struck her colours at 10.30 pm, having lost — by her own officers' estimate — 290 men killed and wounded. On Mars, 31 men were killed, including her captain, Alexander Hood, and 60 wounded. Captain Louis Lhéritier of Hercule was wounded by sabre and spike leading his boarding party.

The Hercule was recommissioned in the Royal Navy as HMS Hercule.

== British career ==
In mid-1803, the squadron under Captain Henry William Bayntun, consisting of Cumberland, Hercule, Bellerophon, Elephant, and Vanguard captured Poisson Volant and Superieure. The Royal Navy took both into service.

In May 1803, Hercule's captain Solomon Ferris died suddenly on board the ship.

On 28 June 1803, during the Blockade of Saint-Domingue in the Caribbean Hercule was under First Lieutenant John B. Hills, acting captain as Ferris had died a month before. She encountered the French frigate Poursuivante and the corvette Mignonne, and attempted to capture Poursuivante. However, the latter outmaneuvered and delivered raking fire to assure her escape. Hercule was stricken across its rigging and dropped out of the fight. Louis-Philippe Crépin painted the sails, sky, smoke and fire in his relevant seascape. HMS Goliath then captured Mignonne.

Hercule, under Captain Dun, participated in the failed attempt in January 1804 to capture Curaçao.

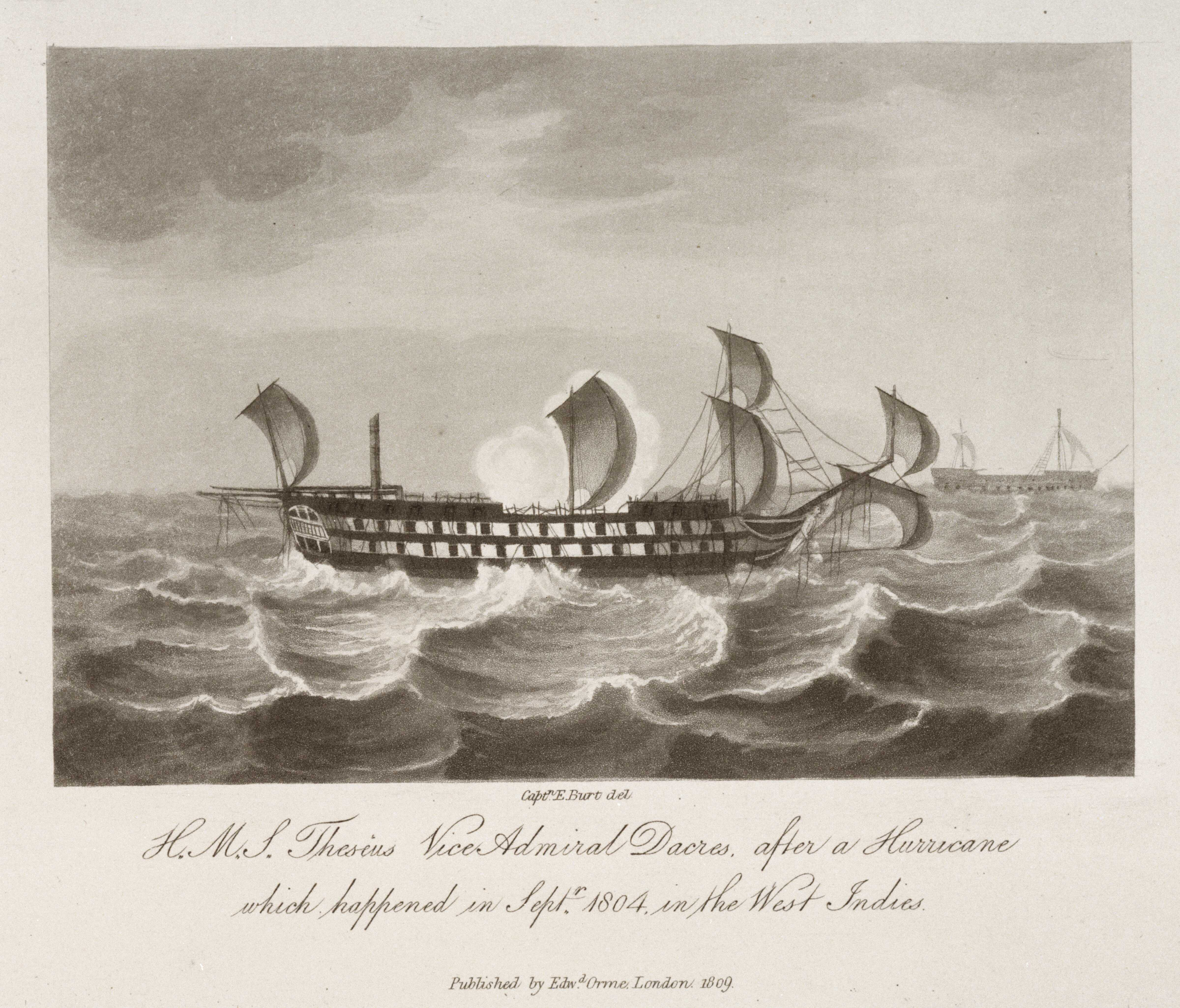
Theseus, (seen in the foreground) after a Hurricane she was caught in off San Domingo between 4 and 11 September 1804. Both Theseus and Hercule (seen in the background) were badly damaged, but eventually survived to reach Port Royal on 15 September

Hercule, was caught in a Hurricane off San Domingo between 4 and 11 September 1804, both she and HMS Theseus were badly damaged, but eventually survived to reach Port Royal on 15 September.

== Fate ==
She was broken up in 1810.

== See also ==
- List of ships captured in the 19th century
- List of ships of the line of France
