= HMS Mars (1794) =

Ship of the British Royal Navy, launched on 25 October 1794

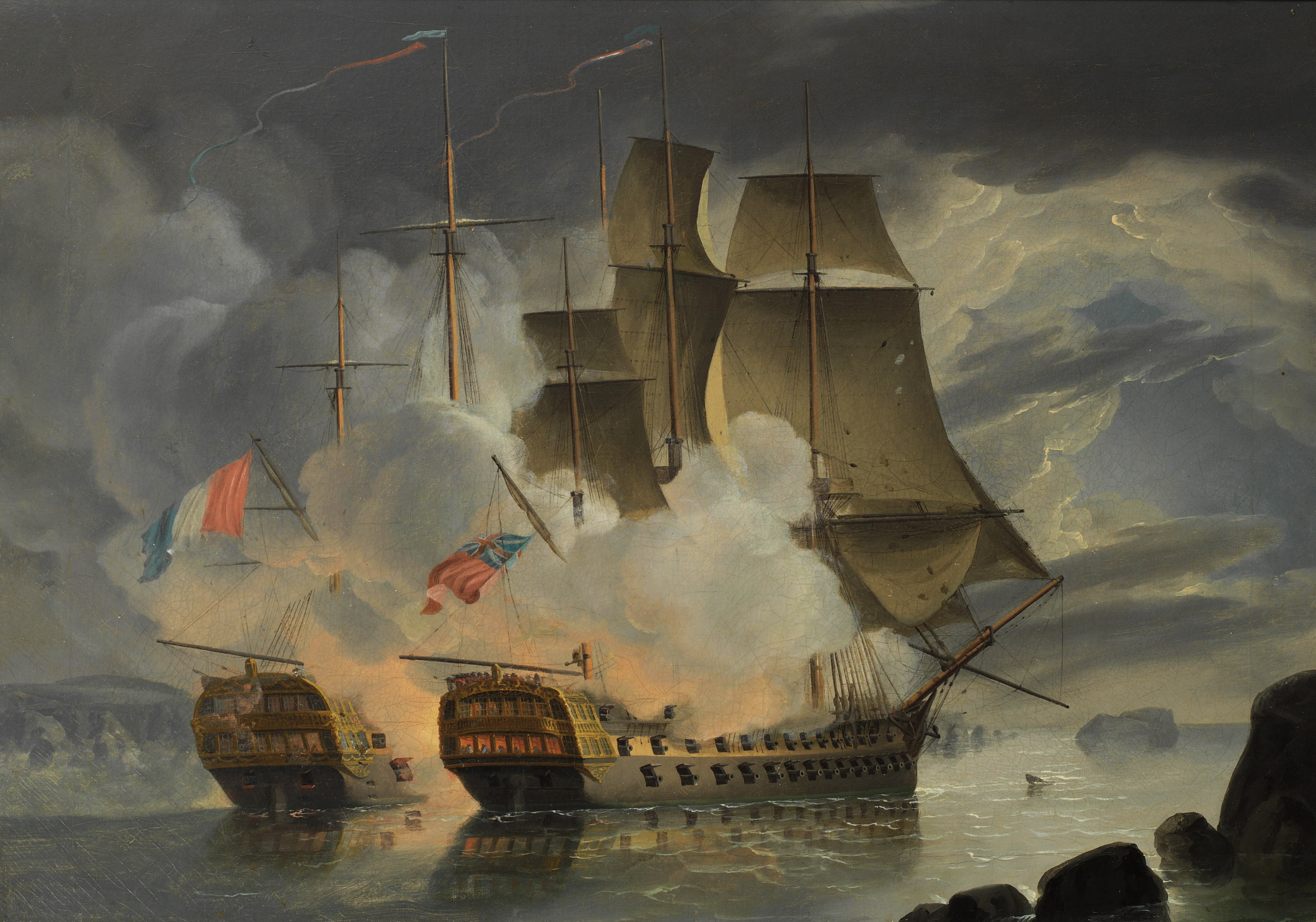
- H.M.S. Mars and the French '74 Hercule off Brest, 21st April 1798, John Christian Schetky

History

Great Britain
- Name: HMS Mars
- Ordered: 17 January 1788
- Builder: Deptford Dockyard
- Laid down: 10 October 1789
- Launched: 25 October 1794
- Fate: Broken up, 1823
- Notes: Participated in: Battle of Trafalgar

General characteristics
- Class & type: Mars-class ship of the line
- Tons burthen: 1,842 24/94 bm
- Length: 176 ft (54 m) (gundeck)
- Beam: 49 ft (15 m)
- Depth of hold: 20 ft (6.1 m)
- Sail plan: Full-rigged ship
- Armament: 74 guns: Gundeck: 28 × 32 pdrs; Upper gundeck: 30 × 24 pdrs; Quarterdeck: 12 × 9 pdrs; Forecastle: 4 × 9 pdrs

HMS Mars was a 74-gun third-rate ship of the line of the Royal Navy, launched on 25 October 1794 at Deptford Dockyard.

== Career ==
In the early part of the French Revolutionary Wars she was assigned to the Channel Fleet. In 1797 under Captain Alexander Hood she was prominent in the Spithead mutiny. In 1798 at the Battle of the Raz de Sein she fought a famous single-ship duel with the French seventy-four Hercule, in the dusk near the Pointe du Raz on the coast of Brittany. Hercule attempted to escape through the Passage du Raz but the tide was running in the wrong direction and she was forced to anchor, giving Captain Hood the chance to attack at close quarters. The two ships were of equal strength, but Hercule was newly commissioned; After more than an hour and a half of bloody fighting at close quarters she struck her flag, having lost over three hundred men. On Mars 31 men were killed and 60 wounded. Among the dead was Captain Hood.

Mars fought at Trafalgar where she was heavily damaged as she took fire from five different French and Spanish seventy-fours. Among the 29 killed and 69 wounded in the action was her captain, George Duff.

In 1806, on service in the Channel fleet she took part in an action off Rochefort which led to the capture of four French ships. She afterward served off Portugal and in the Baltic Sea.

== Fate ==
Mars was placed in ordinary from 1813. She was broken up in 1823.
