= Tévennec Lighthouse =

Tevennec lighthouse
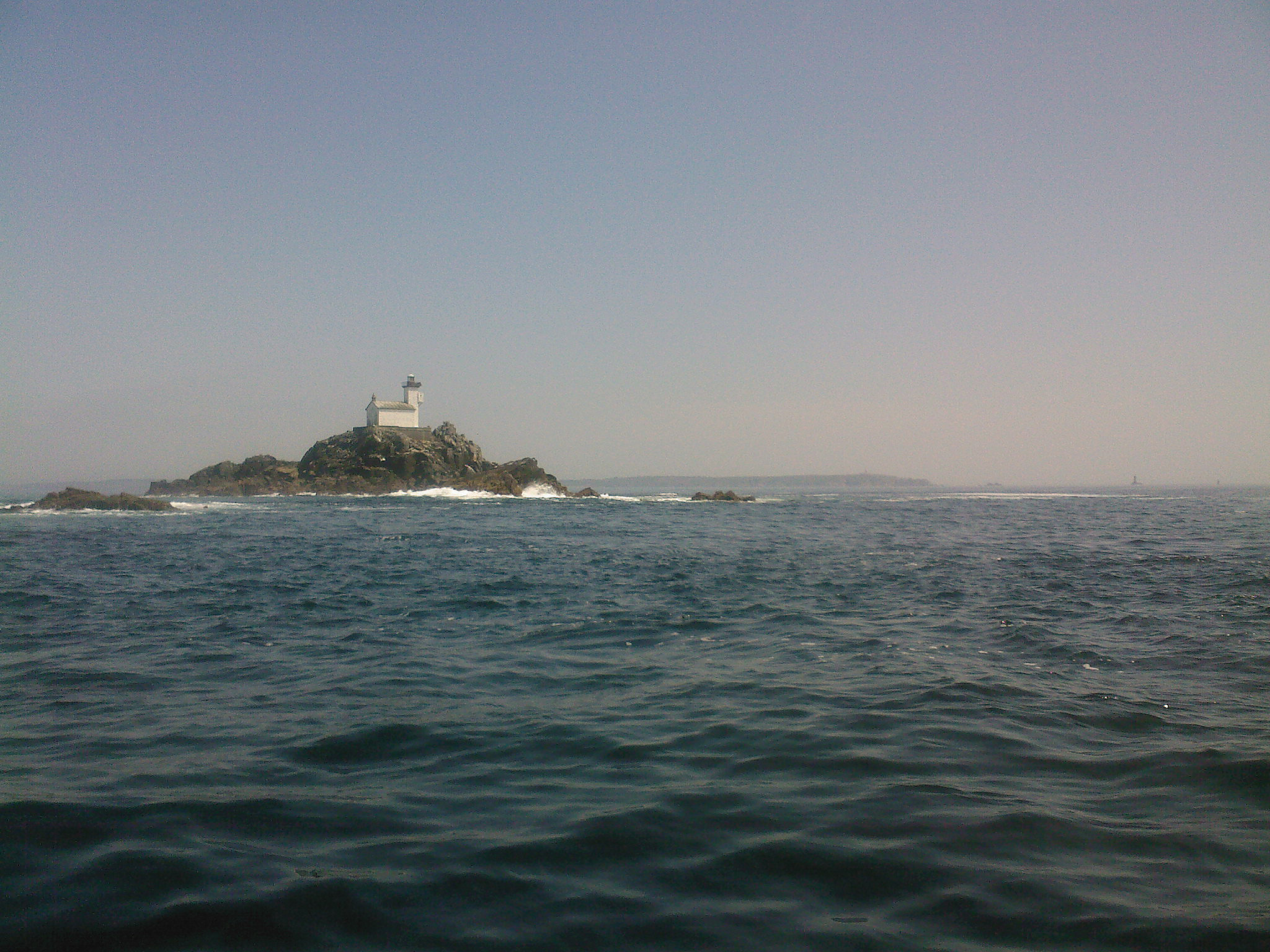
- Phare de Tévennec
- Location: Raz de Sein, Finistère, Brittany, France
- Coordinates: 48°04′17″N 4°47′43″W

Tower
- Constructed: 1875
- Construction: stone
- Automated: 7 February 1910
- Height: 11 m (36 ft)
- Operator: Maritime Public Domain
- Heritage: monument historique inscrit

Light
- Focal height: 24 m (79 ft), 28 m (92 ft)
- Range: 12 nmi (22 km; 14 mi) (white), 9 nmi (17 km; 10 mi) (white), 6 nmi (11 km; 6.9 mi) (red)
- Characteristic: Q WR, Fl W 4s

Tévennec Lighthouse (French: Phare de Tévennec) is a lighthouse located at the western tip of Brittany (département of Finistère), in the northern part of the Raz de Sein off the Pointe du Van. Automated in 1910, it accompanies the light of La Vieille in securing the passage of the Raz de Sein, which presents many difficulties. The rocks near Tévennec were historically known as Stevenet Banks.

It was listed as a monument historique by a decree of December 31, 2015.

== Securing the Raz de Sein ==
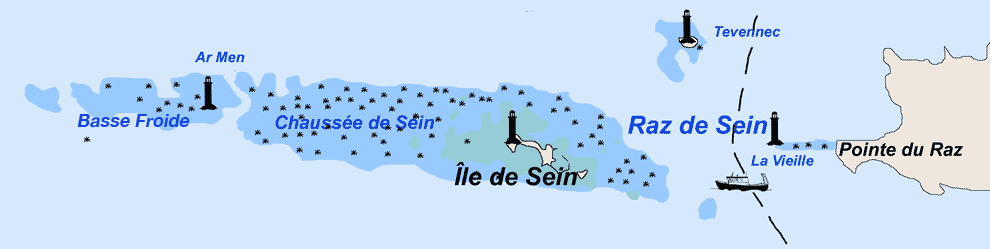
Map showing the Chaussée de Sein and the Raz de Sein off the west coast of Brittany

The Chaussée de Sein is a group of islands, shoals and rocks, which extends about 12 miles westward of the Pointe du Raz, at the south end of the Baie de Douarnenez. It is a major hazard to navigation. The construction of the Ar Men lighthouse at the west end of the Chaussée, began in 1867 and was completed in 1880. This aided navigation for ships taking the route to the west of the Chaussée. There is also a passage between the île de Sein and the Pointe du Raz which provides a shortcut, the Raz de Sein. In 1796, during the Napoleonic Wars, the French ship Séduisant, part of a force intending to invade Ireland, was wrecked on the Tévennec rocks while attempting to pass the Raz de Sein at night. Hundreds of lives were lost. The Tévennec lighthouse, situated to the north of the Raz de Sein, aids navigation through this passage.

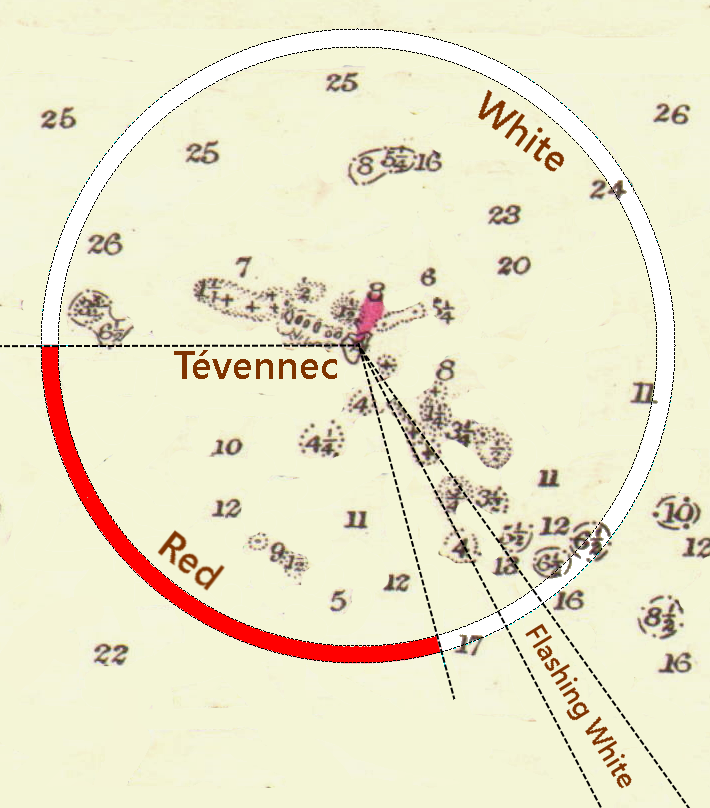
Sectors of the Tévennec lighthouse re-drawn from an 1895 nautical chart. The configuration was unchanged in 2021-2

The Tévennec light was first activated in 1875. It is an early example of a Sector light, with different characteristics (Red/White or flashing rates) indicating safe approach bearings.

== Legends ==
According to Jean-Christophe Fichou and Francis Dreyer, the lighthouse is said to be "one of the strangest places in the history of lighthouses," and is rumored to be haunted.

The lighthouse was classified as the fourth category, requiring a single keeper and a service period of a year. A series of 23 keepers lived at the light until automation. According to legend, the first lighthouse keeper, Henri Guezennec, was driven insane by ghostly voices demanding his departure. Allegedly Guezennec's replacement, Minou, had a similar experience. The French government then reclassified Tévennec as a two-man lighthouse; however, applications were rare. In 1897 the government began recruiting married couples to keep the lighthouse. Some unexplained deaths occurred. The first couple to accept the job were the Milliners. The most durable keepers, Louis and Marie-Jacquette Quéméré, followed them with their three children and a cow and remained five years. In 1907 a new couple replaced them, Msr. Roparz and his wife. More deaths occurred and a storm destroyed a part of the lighthouse while the keeper's wife was in childbirth. The lighthouse was automated in 1910.

== See also ==
- List of lighthouses in France
