= La Vieille =

Vieille Light
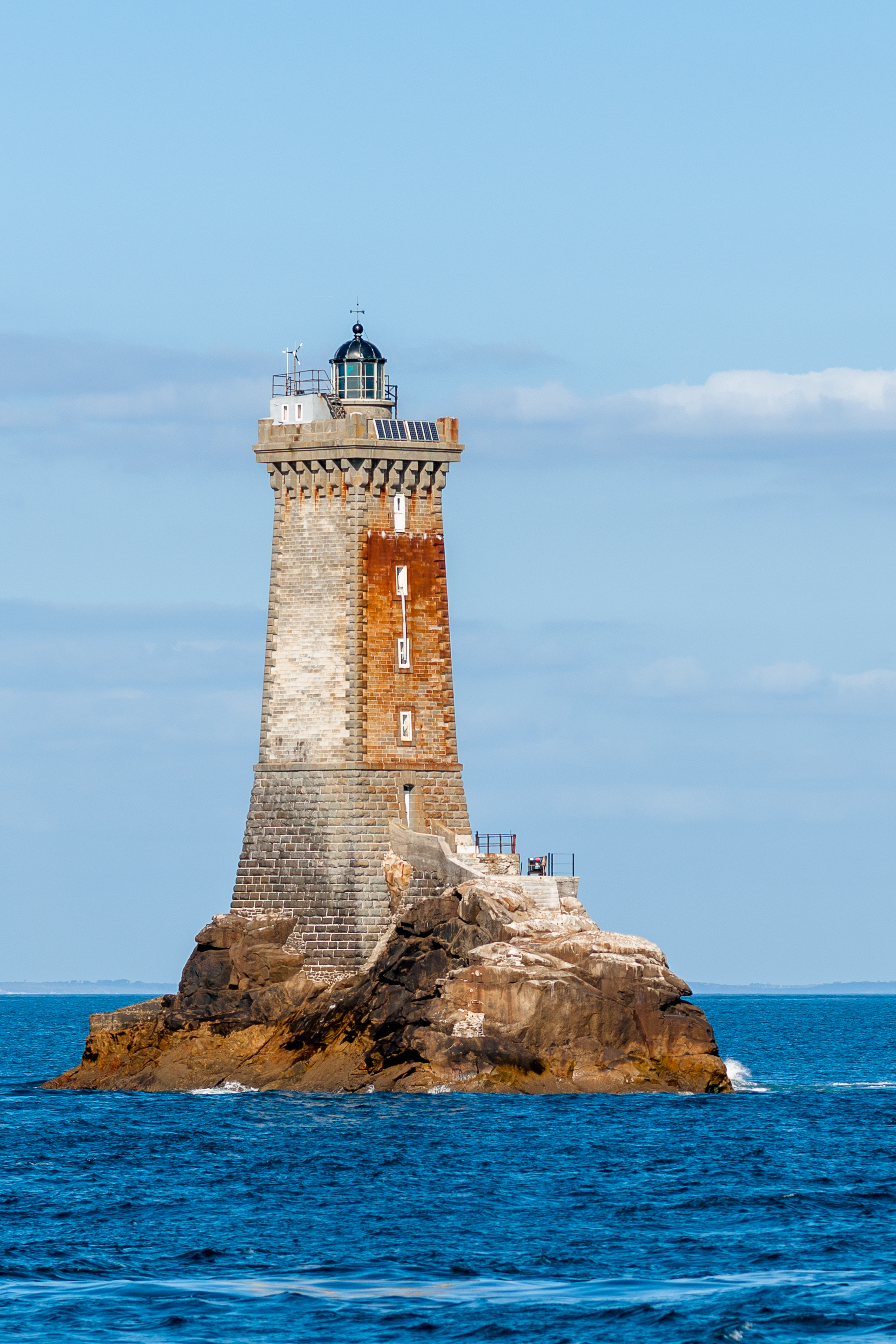
- Location: Raz de Sein; Finistère; Brittany; France
- Coordinates: 48°02′26.8″N 4°45′23.2″W

Tower
- Constructed: 1887
- Built by: Victor Fénoux
- Construction: granite, kersantite
- Automated: 1995
- Height: 27 m (89 ft)
- Shape: tapered square tower with balcony and lantern
- Markings: unpainted tower with an upper black band, black lantern
- Power source: solar power
- Heritage: monument historique inscrit
- Fog signal: ELAC-ELAU 2200 vibrator (2+1 blasts every 60 seconds)

Light
- First lit: 1887
- Focal height: 33 m (108 ft)
- Lens: 4/5 horizon lens, 50 cm focal length, dpt 3 m
- Intensity: 250 W halogen lamp
- Range: 18 nautical miles (33 km)
- Characteristic: Oc (2+1) WRG 12s.
- France no.: FR-0700

Aerial view

La Vieille (French pronunciation: [la vjɛj], "The Old Lady" or "The Wrass") is a lighthouse in the département of Finistère at the commune of Plogoff, on the northwest coast of France. It lies on the rock known as Gorlebella (Breton for "farthest rock"), guiding mariners in the strait Raz de Sein, across from the companion lighthouse Tourelle de la Plate—also known as Petite Vieille ("Little Old Woman"). It is among the small class of lighthouses around the coasts of France carrying the moniker "hell", due to a remote position in rough seas.

Initial planning talks began as early as 1861, though the construction project was not confirmed until twenty years later. Fierce tides limited the period in which building work could take place to less than half of each year. After five years, construction was complete and its beam first shone in 1887. The light is occulting, with a range of 18 nautical miles (33 km); a foghorn was installed in the early twentieth century.

La Vieille achieved notoriety in the 1920s when two disabled war veterans were stranded there for weeks by storms, their health deteriorating. They were employed under a new law reserving the job of lighthouse keeper to those who had served in the war. The tremendous difficulties experienced in getting them back to shore led to the repeal of the new law. In 1995 it was the penultimate French lighthouse to become automated, a process delayed due to the keepers on-site staging a protest against the task being carried out.

== Construction and history ==
=== Planning ===
On 30 November 1861, the French Commission des Phares (the Lighthouse Commission) decided in favour of constructing a "3rd order" lighthouse on Gorlebella rock, inviting engineers to carry out a pilot study the following year. The study was postponed, however, due to funding difficulties as well as other construction projects such as Ar Men having just begun.

The project resumed ten years later, but the Service des Phares (Lighthouse Service) director was forced to admit on 1 June 1872 that "construction of a lighthouse on La Vieille will be postponed for the foreseeable future, and the difficulties encountered in embarking on the rock could even see it abandoned altogether". A Commission des Phares meeting convened on 14 January 1873 agreed that "the exceptional difficulties that this public work presents compels us to postpone the project, particularly given the presence of similar work being undertaken on the rock of Ar Men".

In the meantime the lanterns of nearby Phare de Tévennec and the Île-de-Sein light partially compensated for the continuing lack of a lighthouse.

Construction was preceded by a series of feasibility studies. In 1879, the first of five landings at the rock was carried out, during which currents and ease of docking at the site were assessed. Fishermen from the Île de Sein, begrudgingly or otherwise, successfully established the first mooring points. Six cubic metres of stonework were built for the base, with the help of stonemasons who had already worked on the lighthouse of Ar Men. This enabled the rock to be boarded from the north-east.

The following year, a dozen more landings were carried out. Mooring rings and securing bars were implanted, which acted as a solid base that could subsequently be used as a landing platform for building materials. This foundation was built out of 37 cubic metres of stone work.

The Minister of Public Works, Sadi Carnot, issued a statement on 29 January 1881 that "from information gathered and results obtained during the 1879–80 initiatives, it is clear we can establish a lighthouse on the rock of Vieille, with the amount to be spent in alignment with the services required." A credit of 100,000 francs was approved in April 1882.

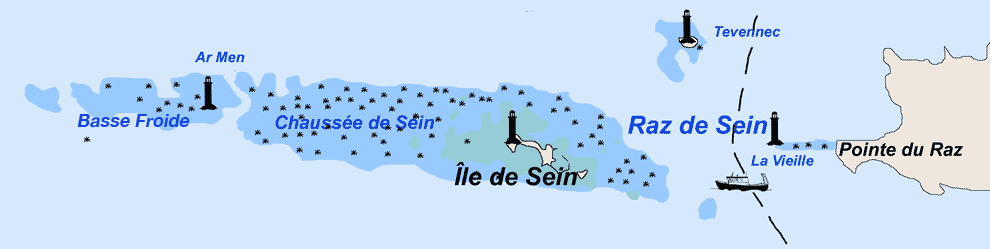

Although the project had been given the go ahead, the conditions promised a difficult road ahead. In this area of the sea, strong currents surround the rock of Gorlebella almost permanently, due to its location in the direction of the currents. Its few sheltered areas are accessible only for short periods.

Shallow waters lay to the south. Toward the east and west currents ranging from 6–15 knots prevent mooring. Consequently, La Vieille could only be approached from the north side, and even then only during the three days either side of the quarter moon, if the sea is perfectly calm. In rough seas, whirlpools of 40 to 50 metres can be present.

Despite these obstacles, construction turned out less dangerous than at Ar Men. This is due to the fact the rock juts 14 metres above high tide. This shape made it possible to erect a solid 20 metre by 10 metre platform.

Fenoux, the engineer holding responsibility for the lighthouse construction, estimated work could take place for five months per year, made up of two days of good weather each quarter moon, amounting to about 30 landings yearly.

=== Construction ===
Firm commitment by the Minister of Public Works to construction of the lighthouse finally came on 29 January 1881, after two years of assessment. Work commenced at Île de Sein, where the raw materials (stone) were stored. The engineer in charge of overseeing the works, Probestau, set up home on the island. Since the construction of La Vieille followed Ar Men, the team were able to draw on a wealth of experience. Each year on the first of May, workmen would arrive at the island in a small steam-powered boat towing a longboat laden with construction materials, as well as rowboats for landing. Anchorages set up allowed the team to moor the steamboat and longboat.

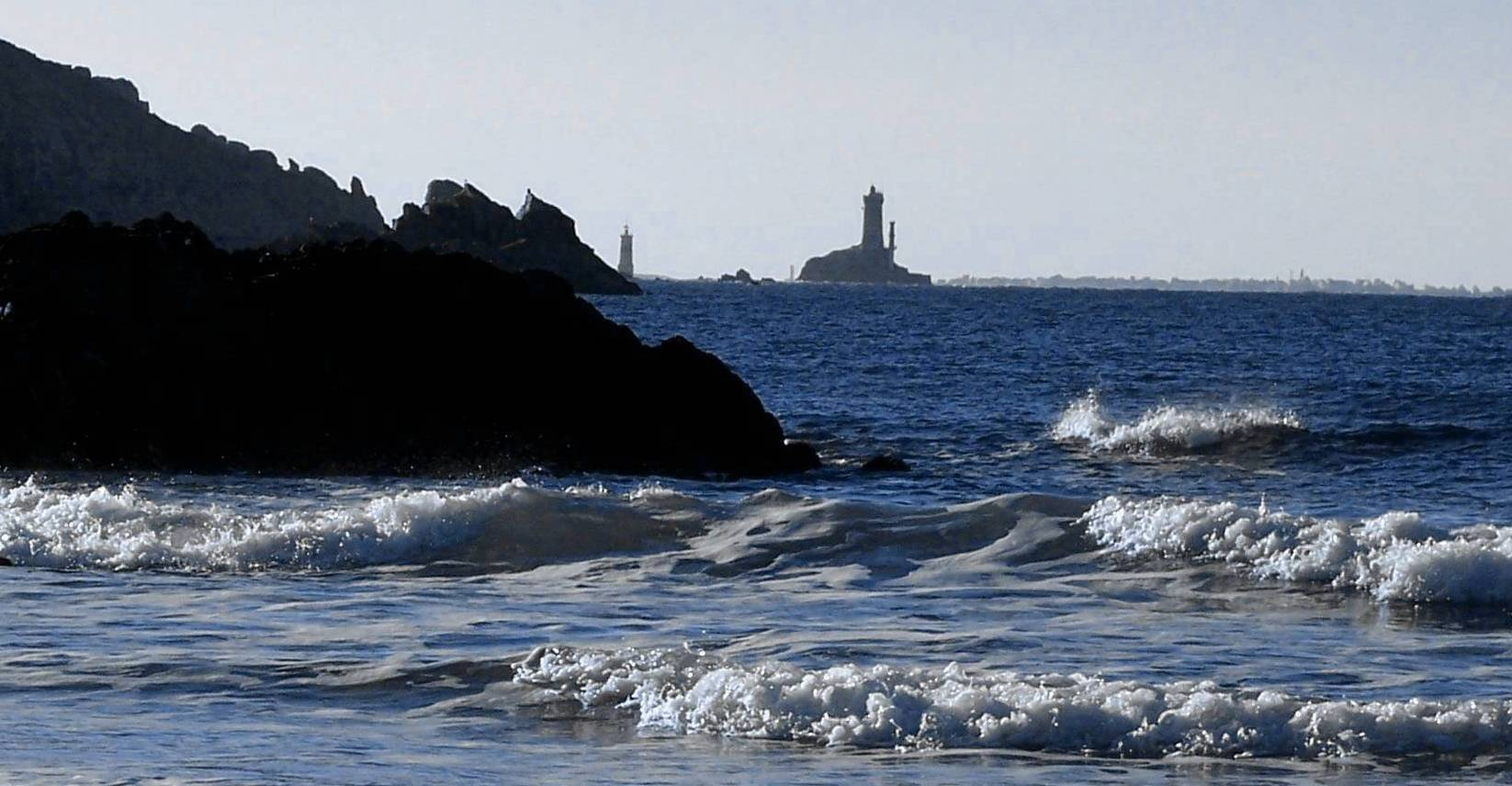
Pointe du Raz from Cap Sizun

Three deadweights in the south-west of the rock were laid down, to dock the boat nearby during flot and ebb tides. A mooring buoy floated a short distance from the steamboat. The steamer anchored at nearby Cap Sizun stood ready to intervene at the slightest signal if the spring tides rose too high.

In the first landings the team erected a small stone shelter, in a hollow to the east of the rock. This housed the workers, their food, and their tools, allowing the team to work on the rock uninterrupted, whenever weather allowed.

On 5 August 1882, work began on the masonry structure. The tower, its base, and part of the interior were finished in 1886, after three seasons of work. The stonework was reinforced with Portland cement from Boulogne mixed with seawater for the base, but with freshwater for the rest of the building. The remaining interior work was finished in 1887.

The feasibility studies and construction were directed from 1879 to 1885 by the engineer in chief of the Ponts et Chaussées, named Fenoux. He was replaced from 1886–1887 by Considere. They were assisted by an engineer named Miniac, who was resident at the site throughout its development. The date of completion (1887) is inscribed on the tower.

The lamp at La Vieille was first lit on 15 September 1887.

== Architecture and fittings ==
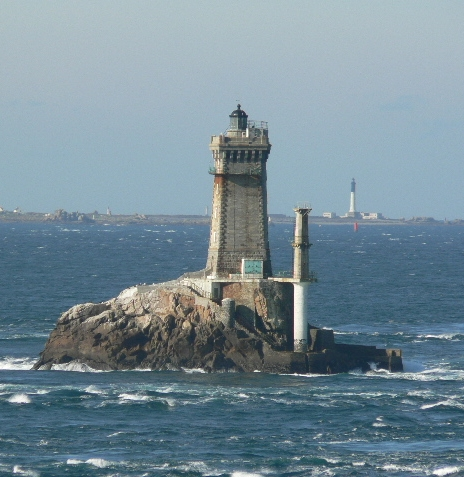
La Vieille

The architecture of La Vieille was designed to be aesthetically pleasing, yet sufficiently distinct to minimise confusion with the nearby tower Tévennec. Its shape is a squat quadrilateral, with slight crenellations. The tower is square and semi-cylindrical on the north face, widening toward the base. The structure of the lighthouse was built in stone using bosses of grey granite quarried from the Île de Sein, while the upper part of the tower and corners were built from coated cinder blocks of blue kersantite.

The lower floors are rusticated; the rusticated stone continues as quoining to the upper floors, contrasting with the smoother ashlar masonry. The stone balustrades of the tower gallery are supported by corbelling with modillion cornicing. The lantern is covered with a black zinc domed roof, while the light itself is enclosed.

The interior is constructed for efficiency. Water tanks are on the ground floor along with miscellaneous equipment. Upstairs are four rooms for petrol (originally diesel) tanks, a kitchen, lounge and sleeping quarters, respectively. Under the lantern, a small room houses generators.

A daughter tower known as Temperley was installed for use as an embarkation platform during summer 1926. It has been dismantled since the automation of the lighthouse in November 1995. Now, access to the lighthouse is by helicopter.

== Signal history ==
The Vieille's beam has undergone several changes over its history. First lit on 15 September 1887, it had white, red and green sectors, with a 50 cm mirror. At the same time, the twin lights of Pointe du Raz were extinguished. In 1898, the lighthouse was equipped with a 5-second occulting light.

Adapting to improvements in pharology, the type of fuel used by the burners has also changed. The original mineral oil was dropped in favour of petrol vapour, from 1898. In 1904 a second petrol burner was added.

A foghorn was added on 15 November 1913. In 1939 the light characteristic was changed to 3 occultations (2 + 1) of white, red and green, then 5 white, red and green sectors, with a range of 18 nautical miles (33 km). The same signal is still in use. During the Second World War the light was extinguished, on 21 January 1944, and reinstated on 1 June 1945.

Although electricity was introduced in 1992, the generators installed were used only by the keepers; the light itself remained oil-powered until its automation. At the time of its automation, on 14 November 1995, it remained one of the last two lighthouses still operated by resident keepers. It was the penultimate French lighthouse to be automated, before Kéréon.

Nöel Fouquet, Jean Donnart, Michel and Guy Rozenn Lasbleiz spent their last night on the lighthouse before its automation on 14 November 1995. In protest against the decision, Jean Donnart and one of his colleagues had refused a previous departure, which explains the presence of four keepers in the lighthouse during its decommission instead of two. Since automation it is remotely controlled from Île de Sein.

== Life in the lighthouse ==
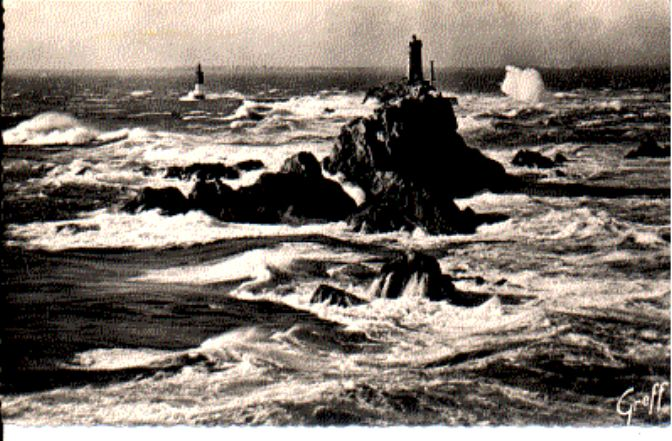
The lighthouse bears the brunt of stormy seas, seen from the Pointe du Raz.

The lighthouse was normally permanently inhabited by 2 keepers, who were relieved at regular intervals, but not together. Fuel deliveries were brought by two tenders the Blodwen and Velléda, both under the control of the Phares et Balises du Finistère.

Rotation at La Vielle always took place the same way: The vedette approaches as close to the rocks as possible, amid the roar and swell of the waves. Once close, the crew secured the rope launched by the keepers. The rope was used to ferry a passenger back and forth. Once the passenger had secured his safety belt, he sat down with his luggage astride a kind of large ball that slid up or down the rope. In stormy weather the manoeuvre was particularly delicate and difficult; in fierce gales it was often impossible.

During rotation of lighthouses using the rope system it is mainly the relieving keeper that uses the ball first. Once on the deck, he passes his lifejacket to his counterpart and helps steer the comings and goings to ensure his colleague's safe descent, followed by the transfer of supplies. This procedure ensured the permanent presence of at least two men on the lighthouse, which was essential not only to service but to ensure accurate recordkeeping.

== Reserved occupation at La Vieille ==
In the aftermath of the first world war, France had many disabled ex-servicemen among its population. The government enacted a law in February 1924 that reserved jobs for these people. These jobs, supposed to be less arduous than average, included usher, office worker, policeman, postman, and lighthouse keeper.

One year later, two demobbed Corsicans were appointed to "Hell" of La Vieille. Terracini (assigned 3 June 1925) and Ferracci (posted 22 November). Both had suffered a punctured lung; the first had muscles in his right arm severed, while the second had shrapnel that surgeons were unable to remove from his body and that might occasionally travel. Their physical condition was probably inadequate to ascend and descend the 120 steps of the tower let alone make the perilous handover.

Once they understood the difficulty of the job, they asked several times to change their posting—which met with refusal each time. Accustomed to a warmer Corsican climate, the morale of the men only decreased. The conditions in the lighthouse, the humidity, howling winds, and the enormous size of waves and spray—sometimes higher than the tower—were a nightmare for both. They quickly became neurasthenic. Despite this, the light shone every night.

In the third week of December 1925, the weather was atrocious. The Raz de Sein was always in full swing, leaving no breathing space to the men. Visibility was zero, making rotation impossible by any means available at the time. The senior keeper was down, the two Corsicans alone in situ. The black flag, a signal of distress, was swiftly raised. Despite the courage of its crew, the relief vessel was unable to get close enough to La Vieille: the buoy tender Léon Bourdelles was engulfed with all its occupants.

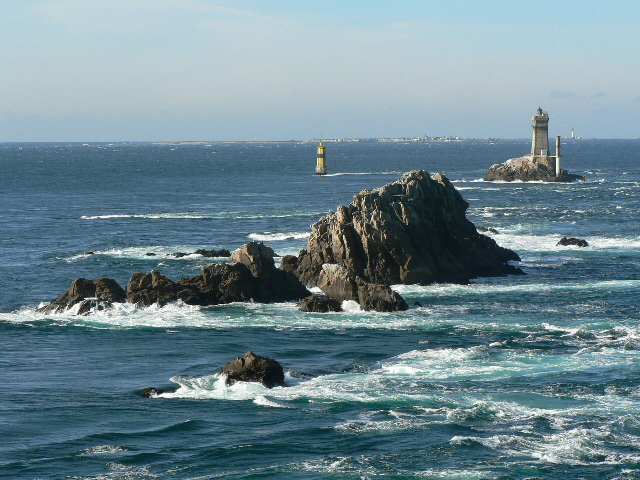
Offshore rocks at Pointe du Raz

Two months later, thanks to storms clearing, the two men had been sighted—in poor condition. At this point, it was the fog that hampered visibility. On 19 February 1926, the light was extinguished, and the siren was not working. Consequently, a Paimpolaisean schooner named the Surprise, struck herself onto the rocks near the town Plogoff.

More than a week later, the tender supply ship was able to get close enough to start the rope transfer. A contemporary newspaper reported "Courageously, despite the sea conditions, the tender Clet Coquet returned Sunday afternoon to the lighthouse, taking with it the chief keeper Kerninon's own son who has agreed to replace one of the Corsicans". But the two had not reckoned on how challenging it was using this mode of transit. A team of young sailors from Brittany, swimming through the glacial sea, clinging to ropes, finally managed to put foot on the island and return through the same route, with the two wretched survivors both "black as demons and literally in shreds". Both keepers were later assigned to mainland lighthouses. Their plight, publicised after the shipwreck, was a cause célèbre of the nation. Paris decreed a permanent ban on employing disabled ex-servicemen in the lighted beacons at sea.

== Portrayals in print and screen ==
Phare de la Vieille and Tourelle de la Plate seen from the Raz de Sein

The Old Lady's place in the public consciousness and its striking shape have inspired many portrayals in film and literature.

- Jean Grémillon directed Gardiens de Phare (The Lighthouse Keepers) (1929), a film telling the story of a lighthouse keeper and his son who are stranded by the storm in a lighthouse off the coast of Brittany (La Vieille). The son is suffering from rabies.
- Breton folklorist Anatole Le Braz wrote a novel, Le Gardien du Feu (1900), whose story is set in La Vieille.
- Yves Heurté, Le Phare de la Vieille, Seuil Jeunesse, 1995 ISBN 2-02-023174-3: Narrative fiction taking place in La Vieille.

As well as its role as a location in fiction, documentaries chronicling the lighthouse plus the human element have been produced.

- Les Gardiens du feu (Keepers of the Light) (1992): A 52-minute documentary, directed by Jean-Yves Le Moine and Thierry Marchadier for 1+1 Production, chronicling the life of two keepers of the oil-powered lighthouse. Marchadier followed this up in 1996 with the 52-minute documentary La lumière et les hommes (The light and the men), which focused on the electrification and automation of La Vieille.
- The actor Jean Rochefort acted as patron for a 2005 documentary, Phare de la Vieille.

La Poste, the French postal service, commemorated La Vieille lighthouse together with the environs of Pointe du Raz on a postage stamp, in 1946 and again in 2003.

== Notes ==
1. An 8 November 1995 automation date is given in some sources, such as DDE du Finistère.
2. Broadcast 5 September 2005 as part of a set of programmes on the lighthouses of France for the thirtieth anniversary celebrations of Thalassa, a documentary series on France 3 about the world's oceans.

== See also ==
- List of lighthouses in France
