= List of satellite map images with missing or unclear data =

This is a list of satellite map images with missing or unclear data. Some locations on free, publicly viewable satellite map services have such issues due to having been intentionally digitally obscured or blurred for various reasons. For example, Westchester County, New York asked Google to blur potential terrorism targets (such as an amusement park, a beach, and parking lots) from its satellite imagery. There are situations where the censorship of certain sites was subsequently removed. For example, when Google Maps and Google Earth were launched, images of the White House and United States Capitol were blurred out; however, these sites are now uncensored.

== Countries engaged with Google Maps ==
During talks with the Indian government, Google issued a statement saying "Google has been talking and will continue to talk to the Indian government about any security concerns it may have regarding Google Earth." Google agreed to blur images on request of the Indian government.

The Australian government has decided that images of sensitive areas are not a risk, due to poor level of detail. It was reported that in the lead-up to the APEC forum in Sydney held in September 2007 certain key locations in images of the city's central business district, where APEC leaders were meeting, might have been intentionally reduced in resolution; however, Google has indicated that the change was unrelated to APEC, while the NSW police said that they knew nothing about the change in Google's images. Images of the prime minister's official residence, The Lodge have not been blurred. However, images of its roof have been and the entrance to The Lodge is blurred in Google Street View.

The government of Malaysia has stated that it will not ask Google to censor sensitive areas because that would identify the locations it deemed to be sensitive.

== List ==
Most military and defense facilities, along with many private homes, appear blurred in mapping services. The vast majority of Antarctica is also in low resolution due to the bright, often featureless, ice and snow making high-resolution imaging both difficult and largely unnecessary. The following is a partial list of notable known map sections that have been blurred or blanked.

=== Antarctica ===
Location	Country or region	Details	Link and coordinates
—	Antarctica	Several large areas of Antarctica are blurred, including one over 23 km (14 mi) long. Blurring is well past the normal low-resolution for most of the continent.	70.177653°S 87.824707°E

=== Asia ===
Location	Country or region	Details	Link and coordinates
Tentara Nasional Indonesia Angkatan Darat Komando Daerah Militer III Siliwangi	Indonesia	On August 8, 2024, the satellite imagery of Indonesian military installations was censored on Google Maps. They remain visible on Apple Maps and Bing Maps.	6°54′33″S 107°36′48″E
Direktorat Ajudan Jenderal Angkatan Darat	Indonesia	On August 8, 2024, the satellite imagery of Indonesian military installations was censored on Google Maps. They remain visible on Apple Maps and Bing Maps.	6°54′51″S 107°37′10″E
Dinas Jasmani Militer Angkatan Darat	Indonesia	On August 8, 2024, the satellite imagery of Indonesian military installations was censored on Google Maps. They remain visible on Apple Maps and Bing Maps.	6°53′40″S 107°32′35″E
Komando Daerah Militer IV/Diponegoro	Indonesia	On August 8, 2024, the satellite imagery of Indonesian military installations was censored on Google Maps. They remain visible on Apple Maps and Bing Maps.	7°05′09″S 110°24′26″E
Komando Daerah Militer Jayakarta	Indonesia	On August 8, 2024, the satellite imagery of Indonesian military installations was censored on Google Maps. They remain visible on Apple Maps and Bing Maps.	6°15′09″S 106°52′12″E
Pusat Zeni Angkatan Darat	Indonesia	On August 8, 2024, the satellite imagery of Indonesian military installations was censored on Google Maps. They remain visible on Apple Maps and Bing Maps.	6°12′31″S 106°51′26″E
Mabes TNI AD	Indonesia	On August 8, 2024, the satellite imagery of Indonesian military installations was censored on Google Maps. They remain visible on Apple Maps and Bing Maps.	6°10′10″S 106°49′44″E
Divisi Infanteri 1/Kostrad	Indonesia	On August 8, 2024, the satellite imagery of Indonesian military installations was censored on Google Maps. They remain visible on Apple Maps and Bing Maps.	6°25′54″S 106°50′23″E
Komando Daerah Militer Iskandar Muda	Indonesia	On August 8, 2024, the satellite imagery of Indonesian military installations was censored on Google Maps. They remain visible on Apple Maps and Bing Maps.	5°33′22″N 95°19′14″E
Komando Daerah Militer I/Bukit Barisan	Indonesia	On August 8, 2024, the satellite imagery of Indonesian military installations was censored on Google Maps. They remain visible on Apple Maps and Bing Maps.	3°35′36″N 98°37′20″E
Komando Daerah Militer XII/Tanjungpura	Indonesia	On August 8, 2024, the satellite imagery of Indonesian military installations was censored on Google Maps. They remain visible on Apple Maps and Bing Maps.	0°04′30″S 109°22′16″E
Komando Daerah Militer II/Sriwijaya	Indonesia	On August 8, 2024, the satellite imagery of Indonesian military installations was censored on Google Maps. They remain visible on Apple Maps and Bing Maps.	2°58′12″S 104°44′59″E
Komando Daerah Militer XIII/Merdeka	Indonesia	On August 8, 2024, the satellite imagery of Indonesian military installations was censored on Google Maps. They remain visible on Apple Maps and Bing Maps.	1°28′02″N 124°50′51″E
Komando Daerah Militer XIV/Hasanuddin	Indonesia	On August 8, 2024, the satellite imagery of Indonesian military installations was censored on Google Maps. They remain visible on Apple Maps and Bing Maps.	5°08′35″S 119°27′50″E
Komando Daerah Militer XVIII/Kasuari	Indonesia	On August 8, 2024, the satellite imagery of Indonesian military installations was censored on Google Maps. They remain visible on Apple Maps and Bing Maps.	0°55′40″S 134°02′10″E
Yonkav 4/Kijang Sakti	Indonesia	On August 8, 2024, the satellite imagery of Indonesian military installations was censored on Google Maps. They remain visible on Apple Maps and Bing Maps.	6°55′43″S 107°37′53″E
Komando Daerah Militer XVI/Pattimura	Indonesia	On August 8, 2024, the satellite imagery of Indonesian military installations was censored on Google Maps. They remain visible on Apple Maps and Bing Maps.	3°41′26″S 128°11′00″E
Komando Daerah Militer V/Brawijaya	Indonesia	On August 8, 2024, the satellite imagery of Indonesian military installations was censored on Google Maps. They remain visible on Apple Maps and Bing Maps.	7°17′57″S 112°43′21″E
Military installation on Weh Island	Indonesia	Narrow area of military installation covered by clouds in Google Maps.	5°53′24″N 95°13′41″E
North Korea	North Korea	Satellite imagery is not censored, but buildings and roads are unlabeled in Google Maps.	39°32′47″N 126°47′16″E
Israel	Israel	Large parts of the Israel have much lower resolution satellite imagery on Google Maps than other populated areas. This is a result of the Kyl–Bingaman Amendment that was dropped in 2020. Since then Google Maps has updated the Palestinian territories and parts of Israel with higher resolution satellite images.	32°03′41″N 34°46′13″E

=== Europe ===
Location	Country or region	Details	Link and coordinates
Mando de Transmisiones del Ejército "Army Command Signals"	Spain	Blurred in Apple Maps and Bing Maps.	40°24′25″N 3°47′16″W
Base Militar Punta Camorro	Spain	Blurred in Apple Maps and Bing Maps.	36°00′52″N 5°35′05″W
Zaragoza Air Base	Spain	Blurred intentionally on Apple Maps and Bing Maps.	36°50′20″N 2°28′20″W
Heliport in El Ejido	Spain	Blurred on Apple Maps and Bing Maps.	36°44′50″N 2°43′07″W
Lisbon prison	Portugal	Blurred on Google Maps.	38°43′48″N 9°09′30″W
Leiria prison	Portugal	Blurred on Google Maps.	39°43′52″N 8°49′05″W
Tires Prison	Portugal	Blurred on Google Maps.	38°43′31″N 9°20′52″W
Lisbon Naval Base	Portugal	Blurred on Google Maps.	38°40′07″N 9°08′55″W
Montijo Air Base	Portugal	Blurred on Google Maps.	38°42′28″N 9°01′36″W
Centro De Comunicações De Dados E De Cifra Da Marinha	Portugal	Military facility blurred on Google Maps.	38°43′52″N 9°11′20″W
Stare Kiejkuty (base)	Poland	Blurred on Google Maps.	53°38′06″N 21°04′01″E
NATO Communications and Information Agency	Netherlands	Blurred on Apple Maps and Bing Maps.	52°06′36″N 4°19′36″E
Ministry of Defence headquarters	Netherlands	Headquarters of the Dutch Ministry of Defence. Blurred on Bing Maps.	52°04′42″N 4°19′00″E
Kromhoutkazerne	Netherlands	Headquarters of the Royal Dutch Army. Blurred on Apple Maps and Bing Maps.	52°04′50″N 5°08′50″E
Volkel Air Base	Netherlands	Military air base. Blurred on Apple Maps and Bing Maps.	51°39′31″N 5°23′04″E
Eindhoven Airport	Netherlands	Combined commercial airport and military air base. Blurred on Apple Maps and Bing Maps.	51°27′05″N 5°41′33″E
Leeuwarden Air Base	Netherlands	Military air base. Blurred on Apple Maps and Bing Maps.	53°13′08″N 5°45′01″E
Nieuwe Haven Naval Base	Netherlands	Military naval base. Blurred on Apple Maps and Bing Maps.	52°57′19″N 4°46′52″E
De Kooy Airfield	Netherlands	Military air base. Blurred on Apple Maps and Bing Maps.	52°55′14″N 4°46′59″E
Legerplaats Harskamp	Netherlands	Military base and training grounds. Blurred on Apple Maps and Bing Maps.	52°07′31″N 5°45′33″E
Noordeinde Palace	Netherlands	Palace of the Dutch royal family. Blurred on Bing Maps.	52°04′51″N 4°18′25″E
Élysée Palace	France	Residence of the President of the French Republic. Blurred on Apple Maps, Bing Maps and Google Maps. In Google Maps the surrounding area is also not rendered in 3D like the rest of Paris.	48°52′11″N 2°18′59″E
Palais de l'Alma	France	A national palace of the French Republic, blurred on Apple Maps, Bing Maps and Google Maps.	48°51′42″N 2°18′00″E
Satory	France	Military camp, blurred on Apple Maps, Bing Maps and Google Maps.	48°47′01″N 2°06′40″E
Vélizy-Villacoublay Air Base	France	Military air base, blurred on Apple Maps, Bing Maps and Google Maps.	48°46′17″N 2°12′30″E
La Santé Prison	France	Prison in Paris, blurred on Apple Maps, Bing Maps and Google Maps.	48°50′02″N 2°20′23″E
Phare de Tévennec	France	Lighthouse in Brittany. No satellite imagery available on Google Maps but visible on Apple Maps and Bing Maps.	48°04′17″N 4°47′46″W
Brest Arsenal	France	Naval base, blurred on Apple Maps, Bing Maps and Google Maps.	48°22′37″N 4°30′15″W
INTERPOL	France	Blurred on Google Maps. The surrounding area is also not rendered in 3D like the rest of Lyon.	45°46′56″N 4°50′54″E
Marcoule Nuclear Site	France	Blurred on Apple Maps, Bing Maps and Google Maps.	44°08′36″N 4°42′19″E
Tricastin Nuclear Power Plant	France	Blurred on Apple Maps, Bing Maps and Google Maps.	44°19′54″N 4°43′27″E
Ramstein Air Base	Germany	Blurred on Apple Maps.	49°26′13″N 7°35′55″E
Boden	Sweden	Military area around the town of Boden in Sweden. Extensively blurred on Apple Maps.	65°49′33″N 21°41′19″E
Luleå/Kallax Airport	Sweden	Airport in Luleå, also used for military purposes. Blurred on Apple Maps.	65°32′44″N 22°07′00″E
Karlskrona Naval Base	Sweden	Karlskrona Naval Base. Blurred on Apple Maps.	56°09′21″N 15°35′04″E
Thun Army Base	Switzerland	Blurred on Apple Maps.	46°45′29″N 7°36′33″E
Prince's Palace of Monaco	Monaco	Blurred on Apple Maps.	43°43′52″N 7°25′16″E

=== North America ===
Location	Country or region	Details	Link and coordinates
14 Rue Emile Sasco	St Pierre and Miquelon	Administrative Court Of Saint-Pierre And Miquelon. Specific building blurred on Apple Maps, Bing Maps, blurred more widely on Google Maps	46°46′52″N 56°10′17″W

=== Oceania ===
Location	Country or region	Details	Link and coordinates
Yangor	Nauru	Multiple areas have much lower resolution imagery on Google Maps than the rest of the island.	0°32′00″S 166°54′39″E

== See also ==
- Cartographic censorship
- Restrictions on geographic data in South Korea
