= Tourelle de la Plate =

French lighthouse

Coordinates: 48°02′21″N 4°45′35″W

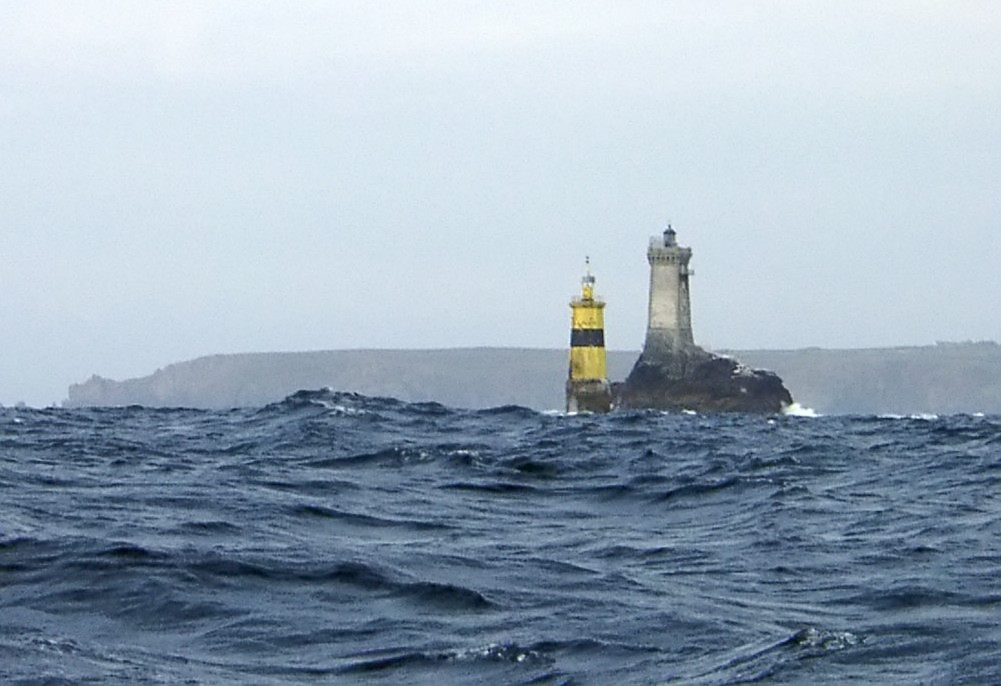
Petite Vieille (yellow)

The Tourelle de la Plate (French pronunciation: [tuʁɛl də la plat]), also known as Petite Vieille ([pətit vjɛj], "Little Old Woman") is a lighthouse in the dangerous strait Raz de Sein, off the northwest coast of France, belonging to the departement of Finistère in the region of Brittany. Its companion light, La Vieille, is 260 metres to the north-east.

At a meeting on 5 June 1886, the lighthouse commission decided to construct a new tower near the La Vieille lighthouse, which was itself then in progress.

Construction began in 1887, but had to be halted quickly because the ship necessary for its construction, "La Confiance", was in use elsewhere. The works, always in summer, were resumed in 1893 and completed in 1896. The octagonal turret is supported on a cylindrical base, these two parts being mounted on reinforced concrete. The whole rises to about 9.50 meters above the highest seas.

On December 4, 1896, a violent storm broke over the tower which was "beheaded". Reconstruction work was completed in 1909 due to many difficulties. The first tests took place in 1910. On August 31, 1911, a permanent green fixed light, burning oil, was installed.

At night, it has a 1.2-second interval white flashing light. Currently, the tower has the role of warning ships to keep to the west of the light.

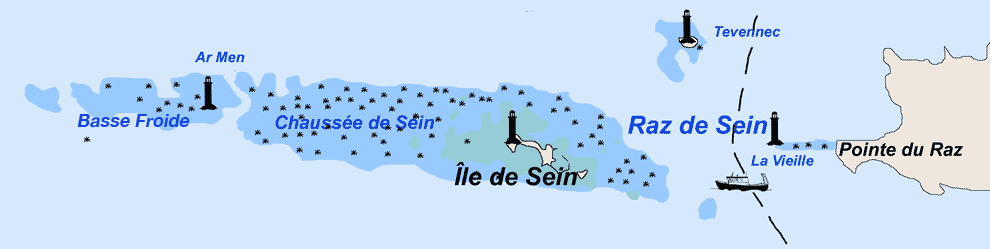

== Sources ==
- Site d'un passionné des phares français. (French)
- Site d'un passionné de la Bretagne. (French)
