= Pointe du Raz =

Cape in France

Coordinates: 48°02′25″N 4°44′28″W

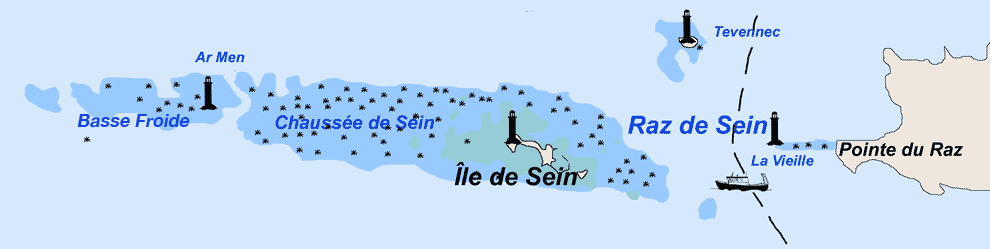
lighthouses near Pointe du Raz

The Pointe du Raz (Breton: Poent ar Raz) is a promontory that extends into the Atlantic from western Brittany, in France.

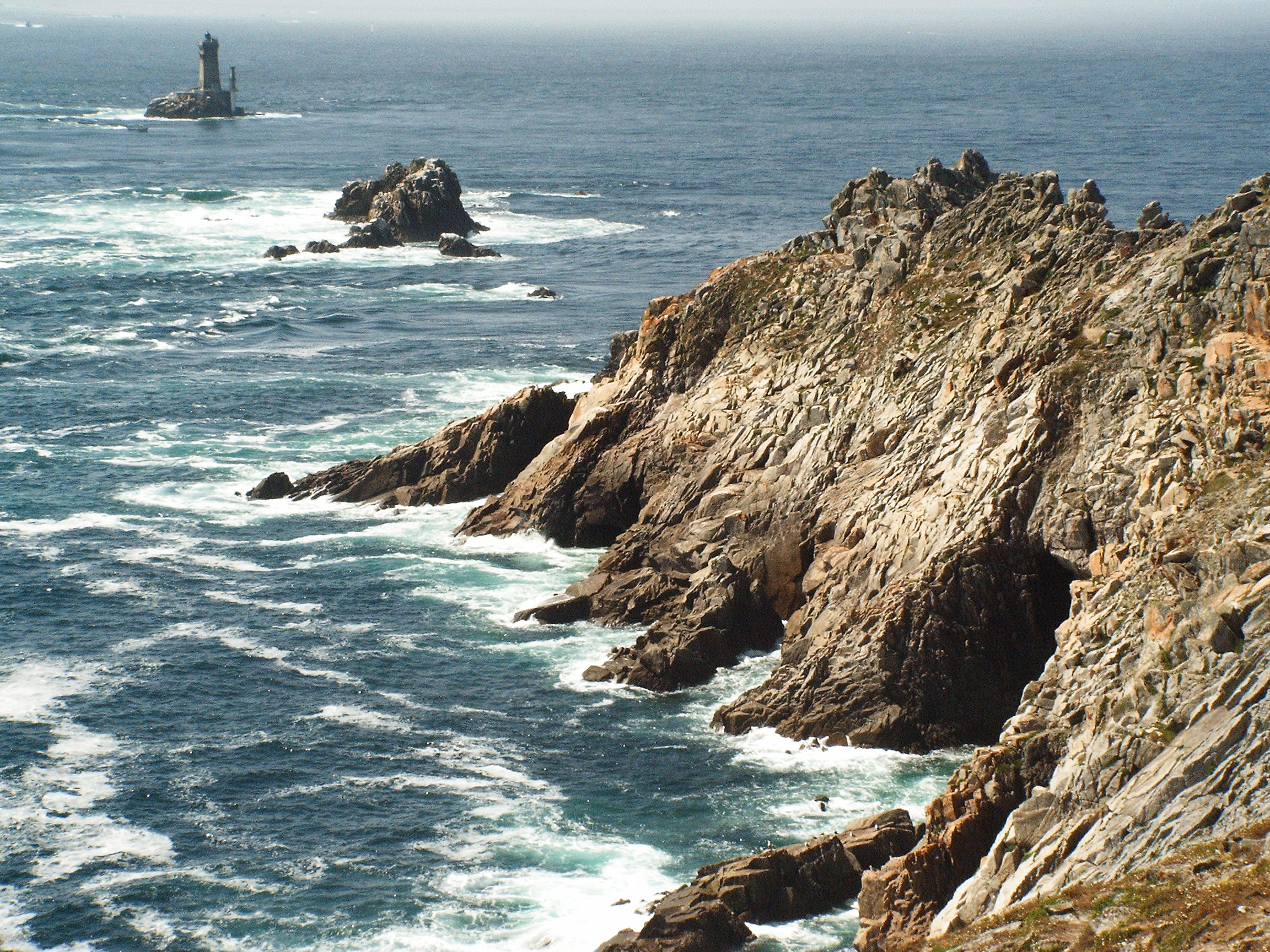
Pointe du Raz

The local Breton name is Beg ar Raz. It is the western point of the commune of Plogoff, Finistère.

Aerial view of Pointe du Raz

It is named after the Raz de Sein, the dangerous stretch of water between it and the island of Sein (Enez Sun in Breton). It is a dramatic place of crashing waves and strong winds. The word raz was borrowed from Norman by the Bretons and shares the same etymology as the English word race, "strong current of water"; both are from Old Norse rás. It also marks the western end of the 3,200 km E5 European long distance path to Venice in Italy.

The "La Vieille" lighthouse can be clearly seen from the headland.

Although it is not quite the westernmost extent of continental France—that would be Pointe de Corsen, just to the north—its rocky isolation makes it a popular tourist destination, comparable in some ways to Land's End in the southern UK.

A brief description of Pointe du Raz is part of the culminating farewell conversation between the hero and heroine of Daphne du Maurier's novel "Frenchman's Creek," symbolizing the passionate turmoil (like the winds and waves of Pointe du Raz, in the channel between France and Britain) that characterizes the relationship between the French pirate hero and the aristocratic British heroine.

On November 2, 2023, Storm Ciarán hit the area with winds reaching 207 km/h (129 mp/h).
