= Kyl–Bingaman Amendment =

United States law

The Kyl–Bingaman Amendment (Public Law 104-201, Section 1064) is a United States law. It was put into force by the Military Defense National Defense Authorization Act for 1997.

The Kyl–Bingaman Amendment (KBA) prohibits US authorities from granting a license for collecting or disseminating high resolution satellite imagery of Israel at a higher resolution than is available from other commercial sources, that is, from companies outside of the United States. An exception exists if this is done by a US federal agency, or if it is done in order to abolish the secrecy of such recordings.

U.S. law mandates U.S. government censorship of American commercial satellite images of no country in the world besides that of Israel. The largest and most important global sources of commercial satellite imagery, such as Maxar Technologies, Capella, and Umbra, and the largest and widely-used online resources, such as Google and Bing, are American and this makes KBA a powerful instrument of U.S. government suppression of information. For example, as a result of KBA, images on internet platforms such as Google Earth have been deliberately blurred.

== History ==
The Clinton Administration liberalized satellite communication and imaging technology for commercial uses and it declassified U.S. government satellite images taken decades before during the Cold War. The Israeli government successfully lobbied the U.S. Congress for restrictions. The amendment is named after United States Senators Jon Kyl and Jeff Bingaman.

== Image resolution limit ==
In August 2017 the Advisory Committee on Commercial Remote Sensing (ACCRES), part of the National Oceanic and Atmospheric Administration (NOAA) which regulates the Kyl–Bingaman Amendment restrictions, announced a review of the current image resolution limit of 2 meter Ground Sampling Distance (GSD). This was done in response to evidence that commercial satellite companies outside the United States were selling images with resolution higher than that limit. Imagery of higher resolution than the 2m GSD limitation has been commercially available from companies outside of the United States since 2012.

In March 2018 research by Andrea Zerbini and Michael Fradley at the University of Oxford demonstrated that imagery below the 2m limit covering Israel had been available since 2012 from the European company Airbus, and a number of other satellite companies had subsequently passed the 2m threshold, including the South Korean company KOMPSAT, who were producing a 0.4m GSD resolution from its K3A satellite.

In its October 2018 review, the NOAA rejected the evidence that sub-2m imagery of Israel was available from commercial sources outside of the U.S., but was unable to counter the factual claims of Zerbini and Fradley or to publish its own research methodology. After a further review in 2019, the NOAA reversed itself and dropped the GSD limit to 0.4m in a decision published in the Federal Register on 21 July 2020.

It had found that twelve companies in eight countries offering imagery superior to 2-meter resolution, and that 13 foreign nations operate such systems about half of which offer the data commercially. It found that 0.4m satellite image products of Israel were readily available.

== Impacts ==
=== Reducing visibility of Israel territories ===
KBA's restriction on satellite image collection and dissemination has been extended to include the Palestinian territories and the Golan Heights. As a consequence, the law has obscured important aspects of the Israeli territories, including the expansion of Israeli settlements in the West Bank, and demolitions of Palestinian homes by the Israeli government.

=== Impeding scientific research and commerce ===
A range of scientists from climate scientists to archeologists often use satellite imagery to survey and assess areas and to monitor change. Such efforts have been hindered by the lack of available high quality satellite images. Also, KBA has undermined business interests of U.S. technology companies with its restrictions on collection and dissemination of images.
