= Raz de Sein =

Stretch of water in France

Coordinates: 48°02′04.37″N 4°46′19.87″W

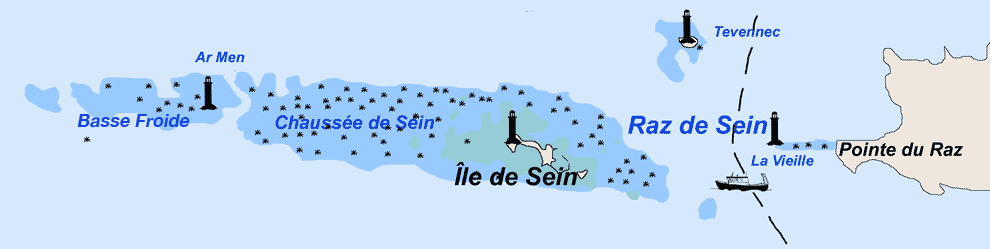

The Raz de Sein is a stretch of water located between the Isle of Sein and the Pointe du Raz in Finistère located in the Brittany region of France.

This tidal water is an essential passage for vessels wishing to pass between the Atlantic and the English Channel, because further west at high tide the Isle of Sein and its embankment stretch for more than thirty miles.

This is a very dangerous zone for navigation due to the violent sea currents from the tides (up to six knots during the spring tides). The current causes the sea to rise quickly, and it is recommended that heavy vessels should only attempt to cross this strait at still water during calmer conditions.

The Raz de Sein is bounded by the La Vieille and Petite Vieille lighthouses and by the shoreline of the île de Sein.

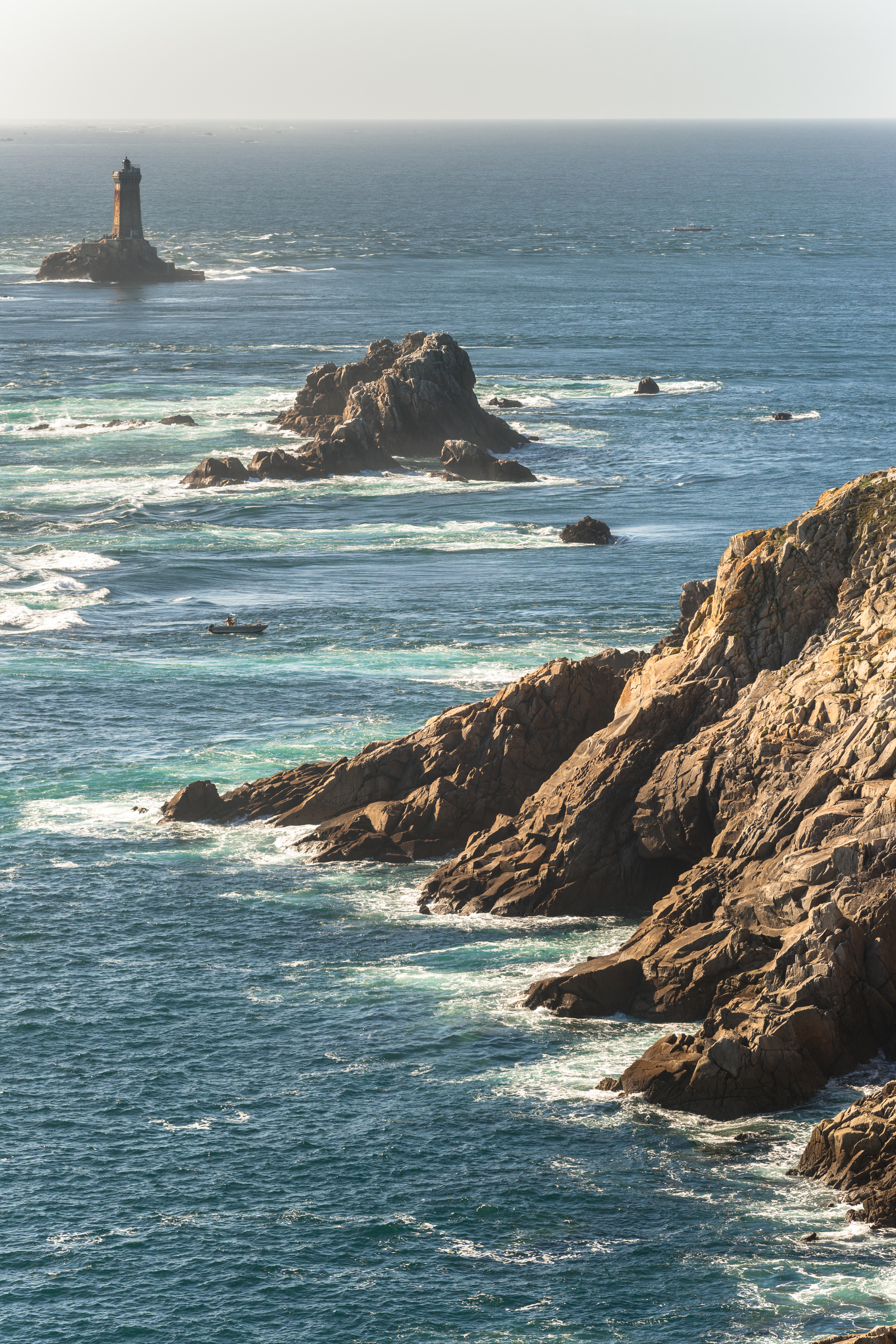
Fishing in the Raz de Sein

== Maritime disasters ==
During the French Revolutionary Wars and the Napoleonic Wars, the Royal Navy blockaded the strategically important port of Brest. French ships leaving Brest had several paths to take, and the Raz de Sein was among them, so it was the scene of several important actions, most notably the Battle of the Raz de Sein. During the Expédition d'Irlande, on 16 December 1796, the Séduisant foundered as the French invasion fleet sailed through the Raz de Sein at night in stormy weather in an attempt to avoid the blockading ships.

On May 26, 2006, Édouard Michelin died while fishing for sea bass on his ship Liberté. The skipper of the boat, Guillaume Normant, also lost his life in the accident. The boat was found two days later with no apparent damage, 70 meters deep and roughly 15 km from the Île de Sein.
