= Ar Men =

Lighthouse in the region of Brittany, France

Ar Men Ar-Men
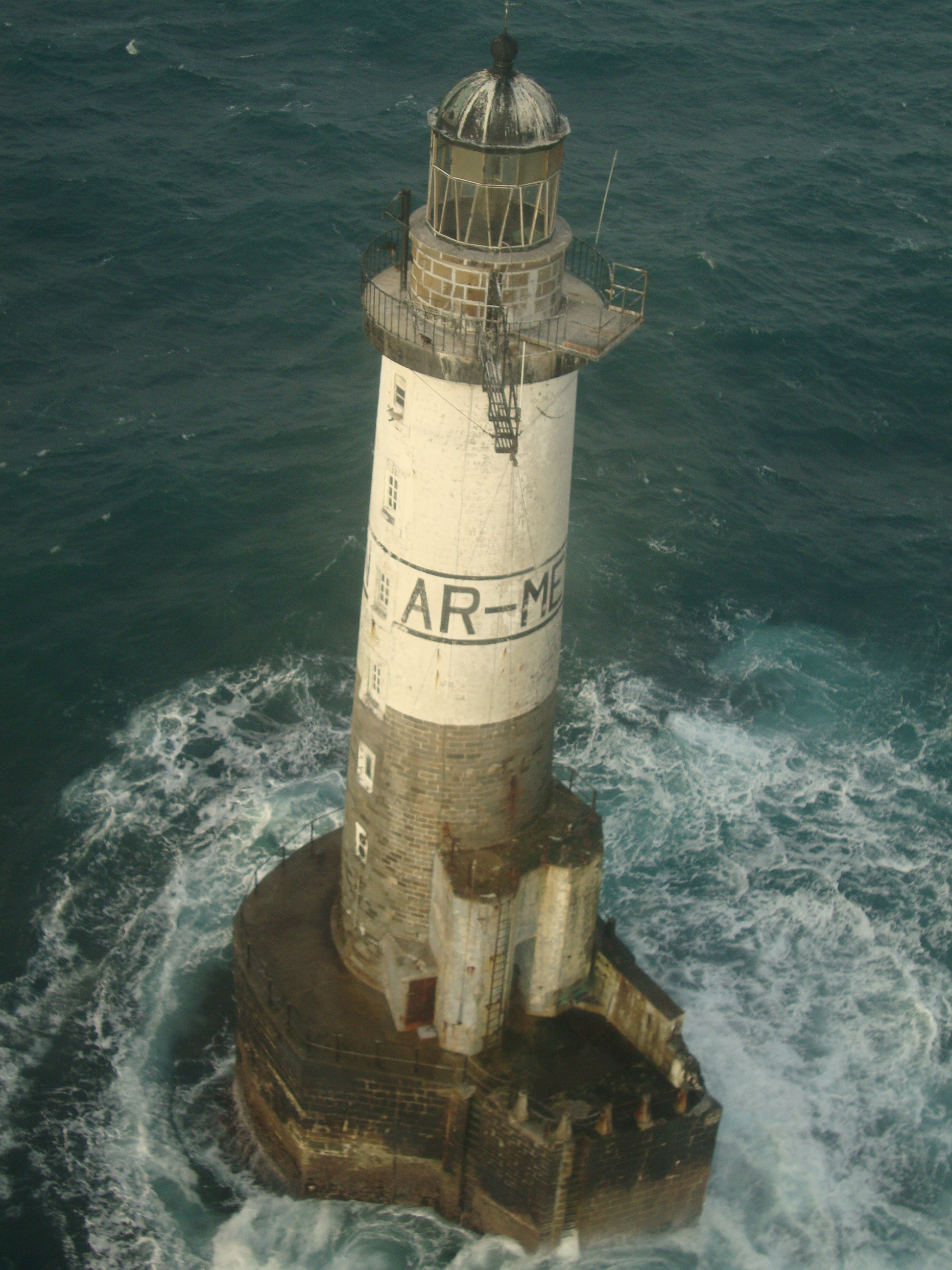
- Lighthouse Ar Men in 2011
- Location: Off Île de Sein, Brittany, France
- Coordinates: 48°3′0″N 4°59′54″W

Tower
- Constructed: 1867
- Construction: granite tower
- Automated: 1990
- Height: 32 m (105 ft)
- Shape: cylindrical tower with balcony and lantern enclose keeper's quarter
- Markings: white upper tower, unpainted lower tower and balcony, black lantern
- Operator: Marine Nationale
- Heritage: classified historical monument

Light
- First lit: 1881
- Focal height: 37 m (121 ft)
- Range: 23.5 nautical miles (43.5 km; 27.0 mi)
- Characteristic: Fl (3) W 20s
- France no.: FR-0694

Ar Men ("the rock" in Breton) is a lighthouse at one end of the Chaussée de l'Île de Sein, at the west end of Brittany. It shares its name with the rock on which it was erected between 1867 and 1881. It has been a listed monument since 2017.

Ar Men is one of the best-known lighthouses because of its isolated situation, the considerable difficulties its construction presented and the danger in evacuating its personnel. Considered one of the most challenging workplaces by the community of lighthouse keepers, it has been named The Hell of Hells because of the severe conditions and exposure to the Atlantic.

== History ==
In 1825 the need for a light on one of the reefs of the Chaussée de Sein was already recognized, but it was thought impracticable to build. A commission was appointed in 1860 to look at the possibility of building a light and after six years reported that a lighthouse should be constructed on Ar Men. Despite the estimated only 105 m^{2} (1,130 sq ft) of rock being uncovered at low water, work began in 1867. In the first year workmen were able to land on the rock on only seven occasions and spend a total of just eight hours drilling holes for the foundation. At high tide the rock is completely submerged.

Hours worked on the Ar Men lighthouse

Year	Landings	Hours worked
1867	7	8
1868		18
1869		43
1870		18
1871		22
1872		34
1873		15
1874	18	160

By 1879 the height of the tower was 33.5 metres (110 ft). The diameter at its base is 7.2 metres (24 ft) and the lighthouse was illuminated in 1881. In the following twenty years the tower was improved and reinforced. Keepers staffed Ar Men in 30-day shifts until automation. A two-way rope sling from the supply boat was used to transfer people to Ar Men. The lighthouse-keepers of the next shift were hoisted up before the outgoing keepers were brought down.

The light was automated and electrified on 10 April 1990 with a 250-watt halogen lamp. Its signal is three white flashes every twenty seconds, with an accompanying signal of three sounds every sixty seconds.

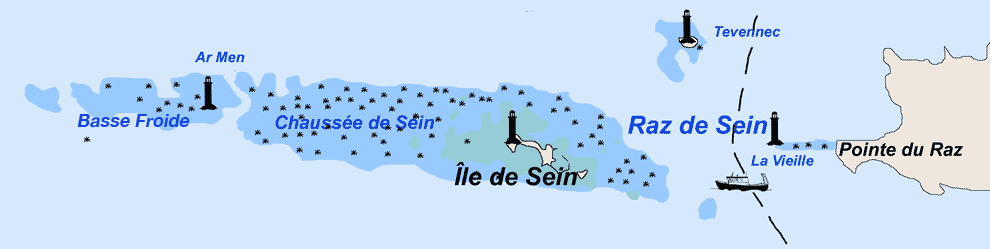

Generally the lighthouse is accessible only by helicopter or by boat if the seas permit.

== See also ==
- List of lighthouses in France
