= Japanese ship Hachijō =

Two ships of the Japanese Navy have been named Hachijo or Hachijyo:

- Japanese escort ship Hachijō, a Shimushu-class escort ship launched in 1940 and scrapped in 1948
- JS Hachijō (MSO-303), a Yaeyama-class minesweeper launched in 1991 and struck in 2017
