= JS Uraga =

JMSDF mine countermeasure vessel

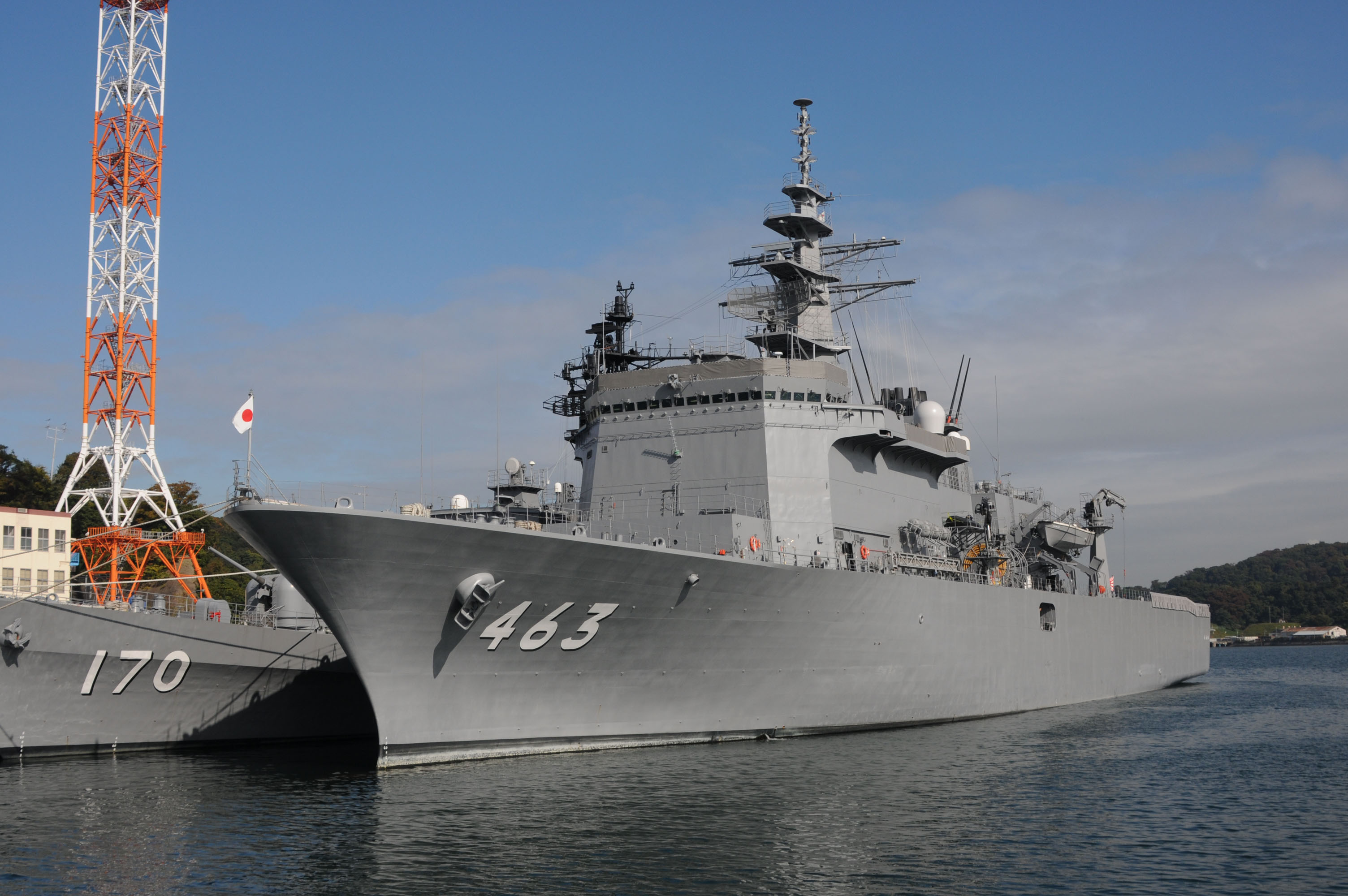
- JS Uraga

History

Japan
- Name: Uraga; (うらが)
- Namesake: Uraga
- Ordered: 1994
- Builder: Hitachi, Maizuru
- Laid down: 19 May 1995
- Launched: 22 May 1996
- Commissioned: 19 March 1997
- Home port: Yokosuka
- Identification: MMSI number: 431999558; Pennant number: MST-463
- Status: Active

General characteristics
- Class & type: Uraga-class mine countermeasures ship
- Displacement: 5,650 t (5,560 long tons) standard; 6,850 t (6,740 long tons) full load
- Length: 141 m (462 ft 7 in)
- Beam: 22 m (72 ft 2 in)
- Draft: 14 m (45 ft 11 in)
- Depth: 5.4 m (17 ft 9 in)
- Propulsion: 2 × Mitsui 12V42M-A Diesel; 2 × axes
- Speed: 22 knots (41 km/h; 25 mph)
- Complement: 170
- Sensors & processing systems: OPS-39C; OPS-14C; OPS-20; Type 3 minelaying device; Mk105 aeromagnetic device; Mk104 aeronautical device; Type 81 fire control system; Sonar
- Electronic warfare & decoys: NOLR-8; Mk.137 Decoy launcher
- Armament: 2 × Oerlikon 20 mm cannon; 2 × M2 Browning
- Aviation facilities: Hangar and helipad

JS Uraga (MST-463), a ship of the Japan Maritime Self-Defense Force, is the lead ship of the Uraga-class mine countermeasure vessels.

== Construction and career ==
Uraga was laid down at Hitachi Zosen Corporation Maizuru Shipyard on 19 May 1995 and launched on 22 May 1996. She was commissioned on 19 May 1997. She was transferred to the Yokosuka District Force.

On 7 November 1999, she conducted transportation training for Japanese nationals abroad around Yokosuka and Sagami Bay. In this training, JS Shirane, JS Murasame, JS Amagiri, JS Towada, and the Ground Self-Defense Force also participated. A guidance team formed by the 1st Airborne Brigade participated.

On 13 March 2000, the minesweeping force was reorganized and incorporated as a ship under direct control.

On 25 November 2001, she departed for the Arabian Sea for cooperation and support activities based on the Act on Special Measures Against Terrorism. On 12 December, she entered the port of Karachi, Pakistan with the escort ship JS Sawagiri, and put together 1,025 tents, 18,600 blankets, 7,925 vinyl sheets, 19,980 sleeping mats, and 19,600 water containers for the High Commissioner for Refugees. Handed over to the office. She left Karachi Port on 13 December for Japan and returned on 31 December.

From 21 April to 7 May 2004, she participated in the second Western Pacific minesweeping training conducted in the waters around Singapore with the minesweeper JS Hachijō and JS Ukushima.

On 4 August 2005, Russia was dispatched to rescue the Russian deep-sea rescue boat AS28, which was unable to surface off the coast of Petropavlovsk Kamchatsky, Uraga alongside the submarine rescue ship JS Chiyoda, JS Yugeshima, JS Uwajima. She returned on the 7th of the same month after a successful rescue of an airlifted British unmanned submersible. She is the first Maritime Self-Defense Force to carry out an international rescue mission. On 25 November, the same year, at the request of the United Nations High Commissioner for Refugees, she was dispatched to Karachi, Pakistan, along with the escort ship JS Sawagiri to carry supplies such as tents and blankets for refugees in Afghanistan. After she carried out the relief supplies, she broke up with Sawagiri and returned to Japan on 31 December.

On 16 July 2007, a disaster dispatch was carried out in the Niigata Chuetsu-oki Earthquake that occurred.

On 11 March 2011, she was dispatched to the Great East Japan Earthquake caused by the 2011 off the Pacific coast of Tohoku Earthquake. At the time of the earthquake, the Universal Shipbuilding Keihin Plant was inspecting annually, and because the engine was overhauled, it was not possible to dispatch immediately, so we will participate from 18 April after completion.

In September of the same year, she was the first JMSDF ship to call with the JS Tsushima at Da Nang Port in Vietnam and at Port Blair in the Andaman Islands, Indian Ocean. After that, she was called at Bahrain, Minasalman on 14 October, and participated in a multilateral minesweeping training co-sponsored by the United States and the United Kingdom in the Persian Gulf off Bahrain from the following 15th to 30th, and returned to Japan on 1 December.

She participated in the US-sponsored international minesweeping training held in the Persian Gulf from 16 to 27 September 2012 with the minesweeper JS Hachijō.

From 4 to 26 April 2016, she participated in the 4th International Minesweeper Training hosted by the United States with the minesweeper JS Takashima in the waters around the Arabian Peninsula.

On 1 July 2016, due to the reorganization of the Mine Warfare Force, the ships under the direct control of the group were abolished and incorporated into the 1st Mine Warfare Force.

From 18 to 30 July 2018, she will conduct mine warfare training and special training for Japan-US-India joint minesweeping in Mutsu Bay.

== Gallery ==
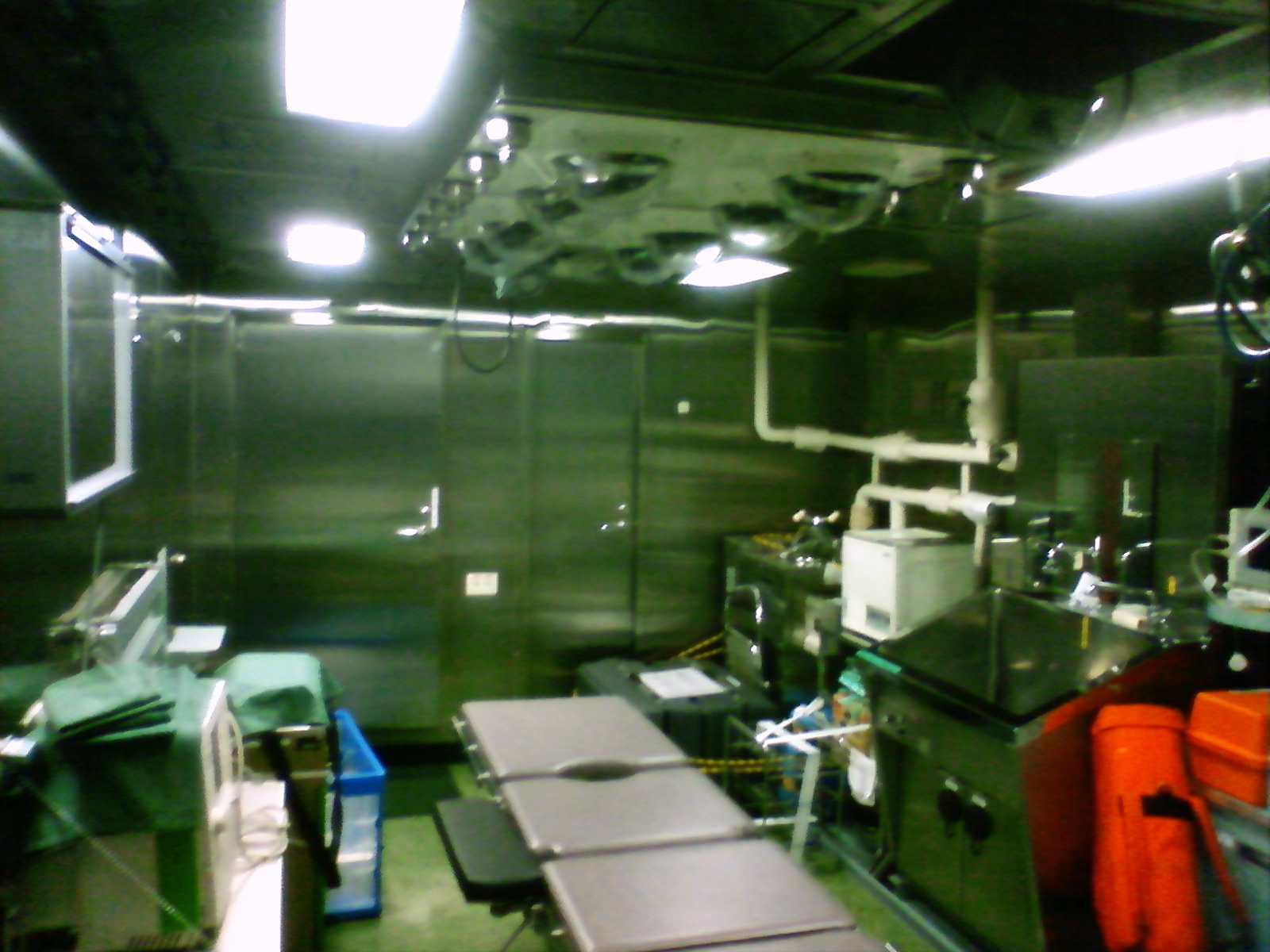
JS Uraga's operating room

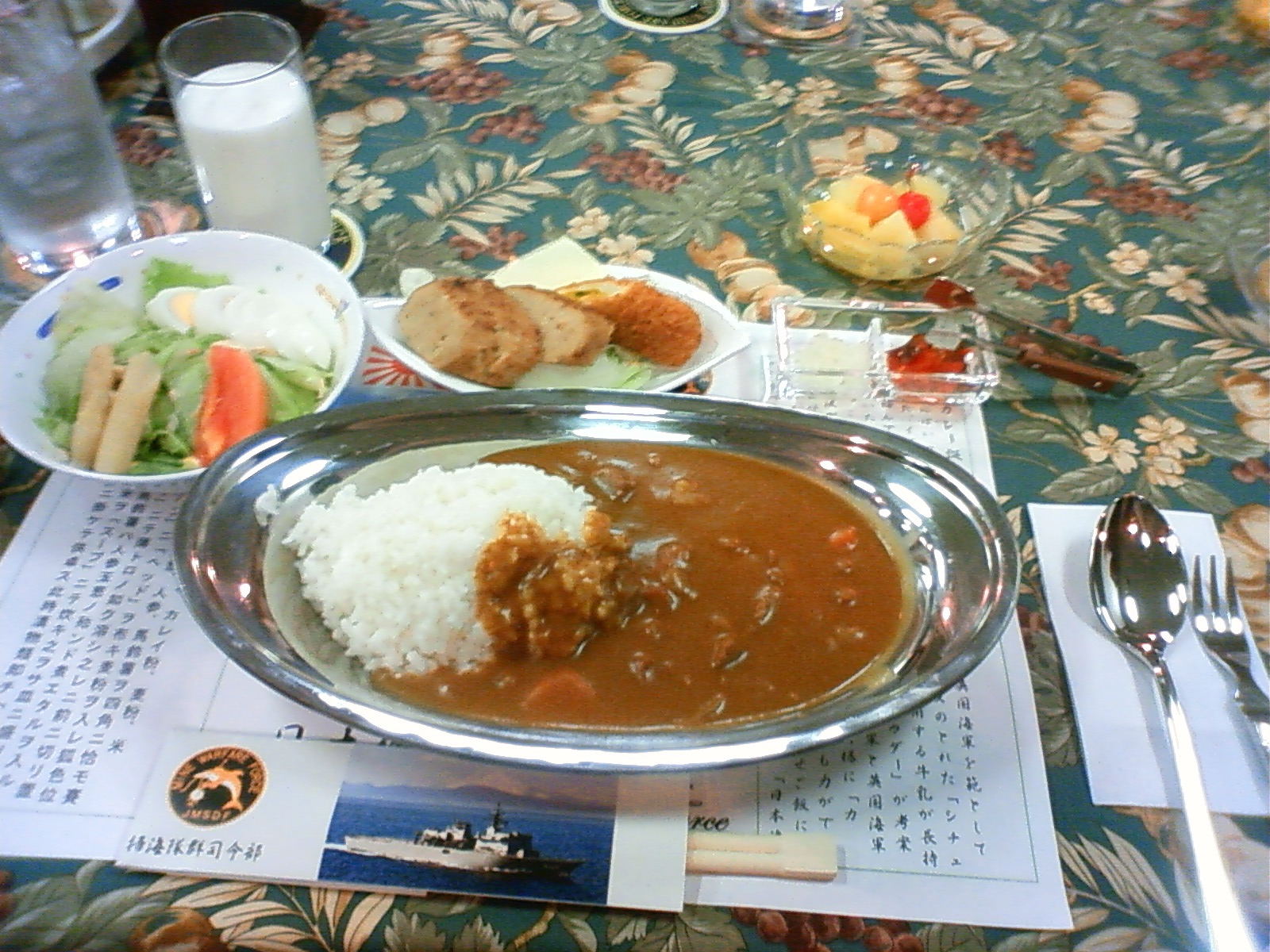
Food aboard JS Uraga

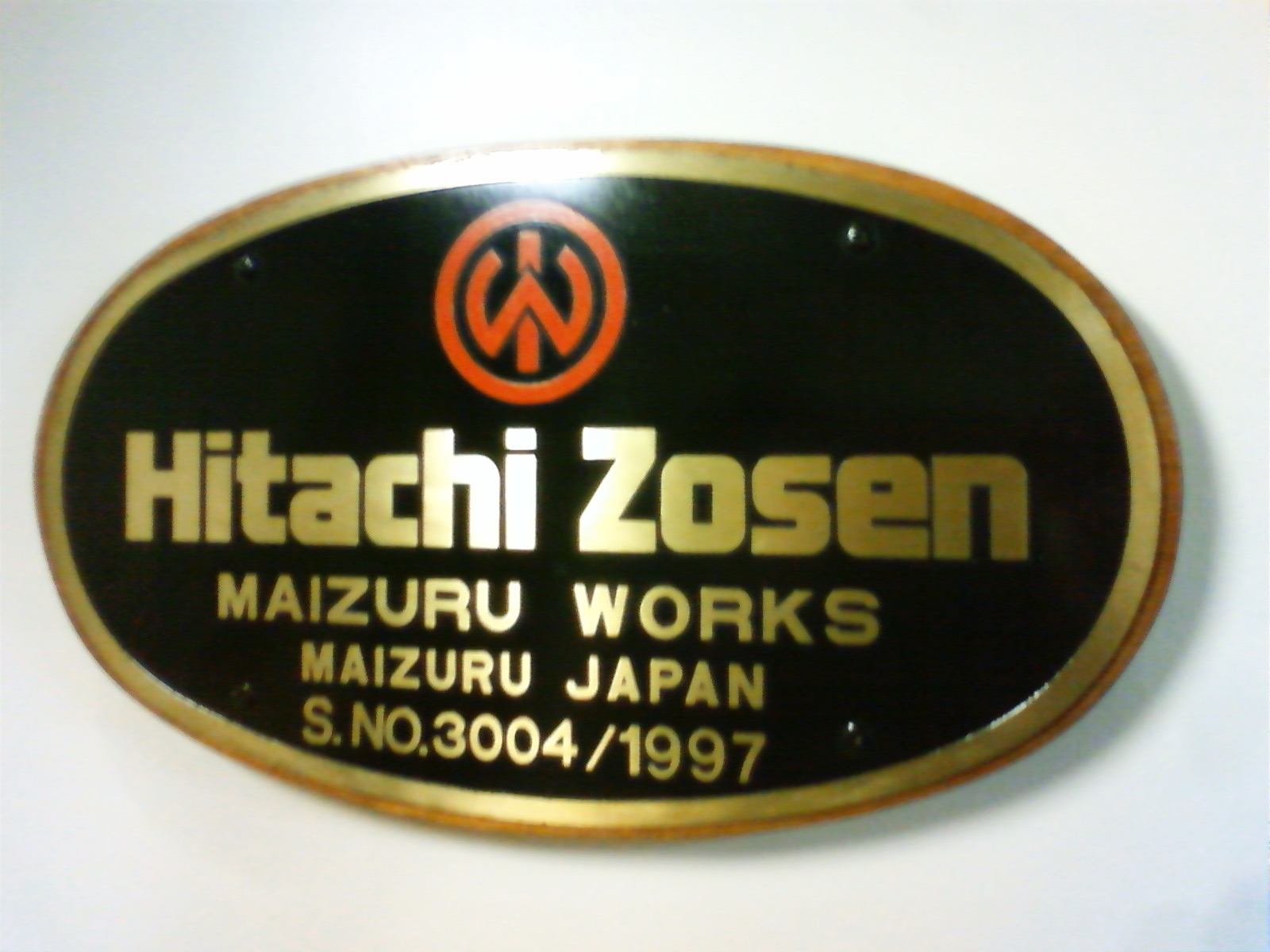
JS Uraga's builder plaque

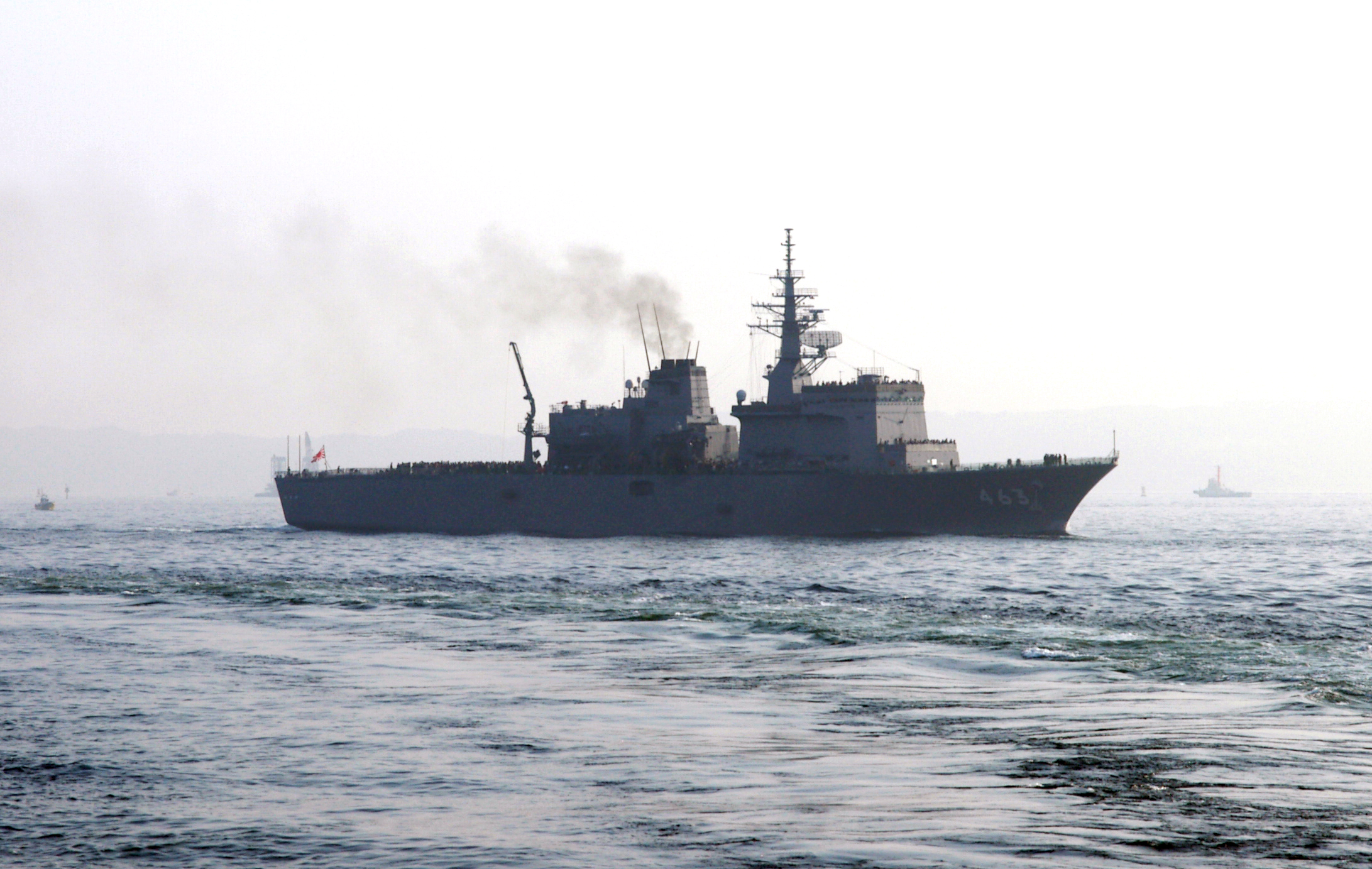
JS Uraga underway in 2006.

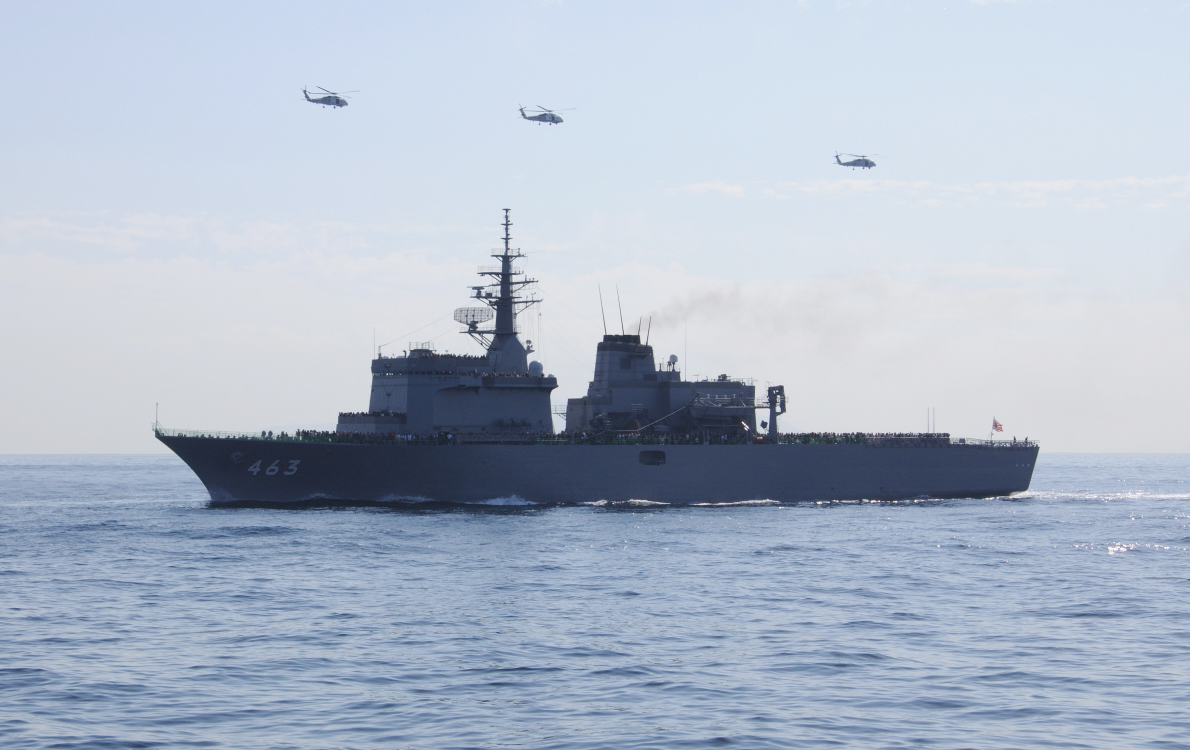
JS Uraga underway during Fleet Review 2009.

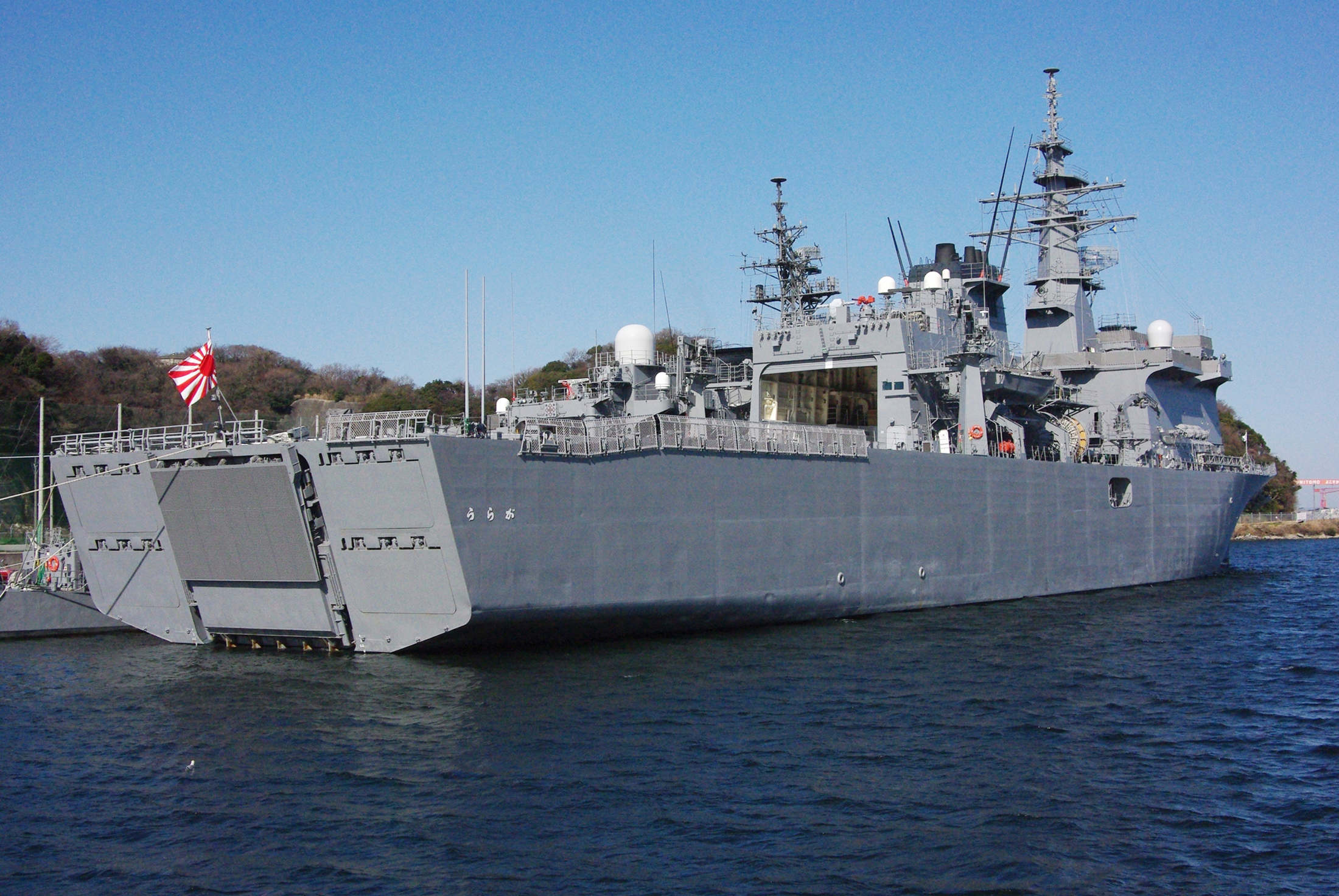
JS Uraga on 8 February 2009.

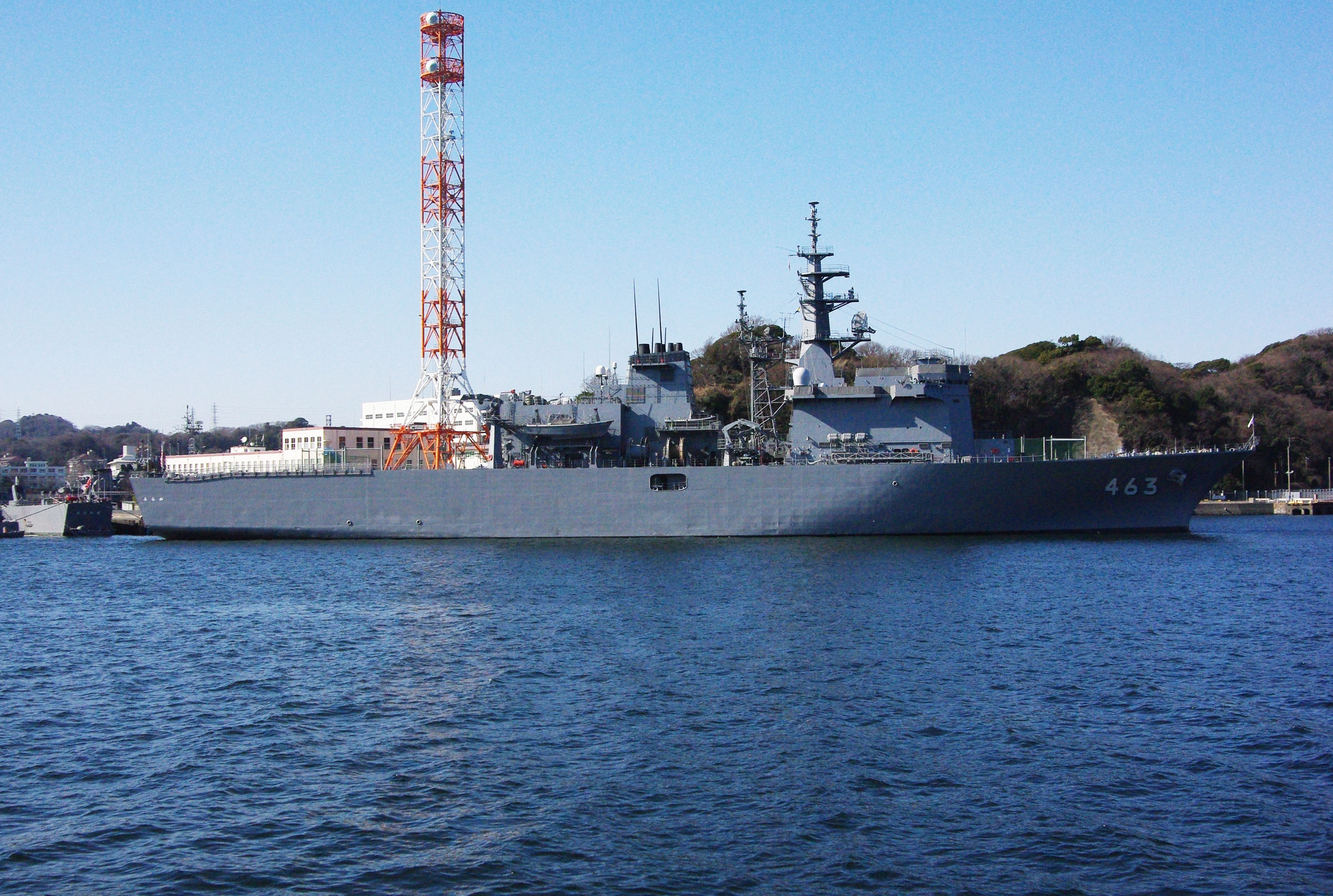
JS Uraga on 8 February 2009.

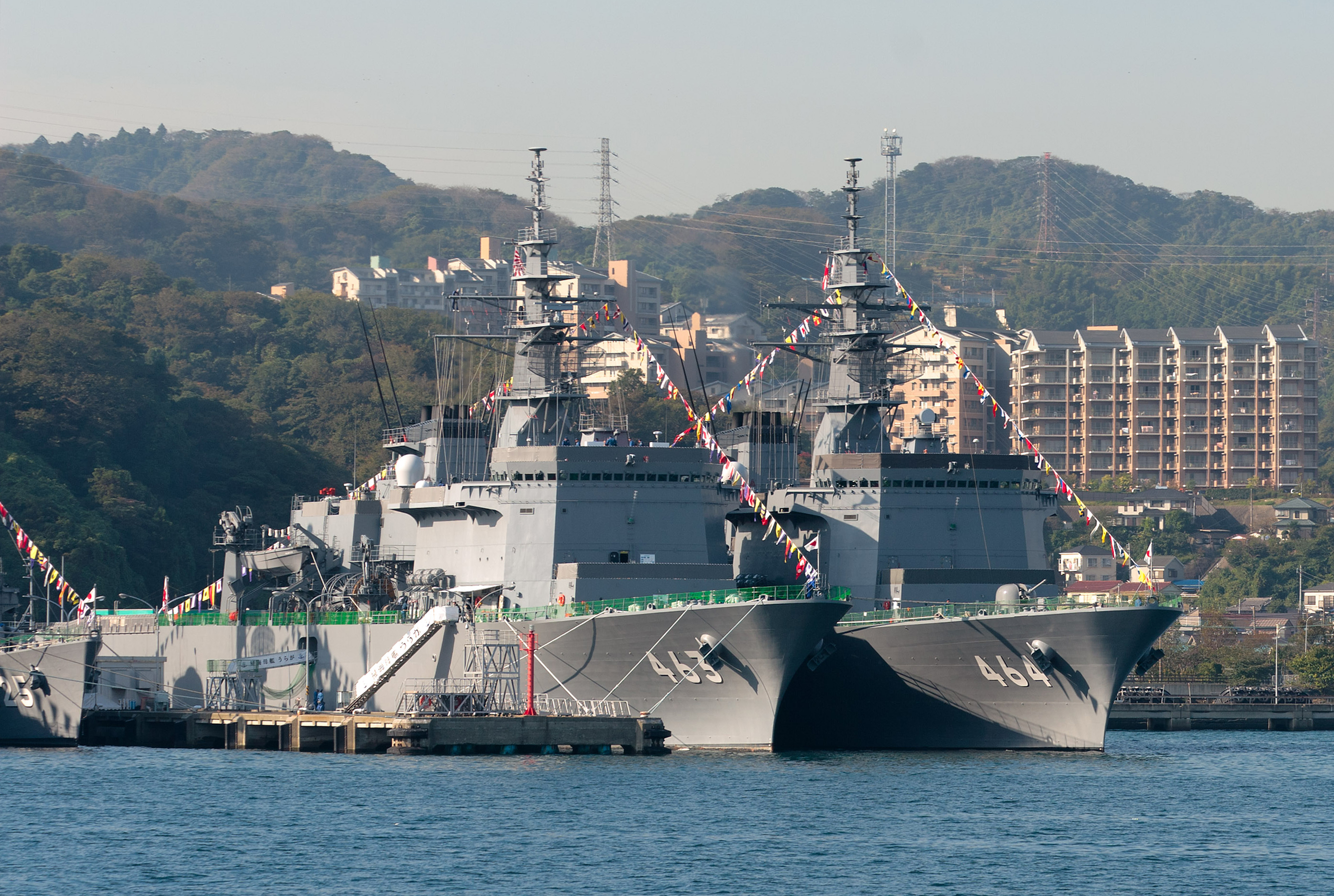
JS Uraga and JS Bungo at Yokosuka on 22 October 2009.

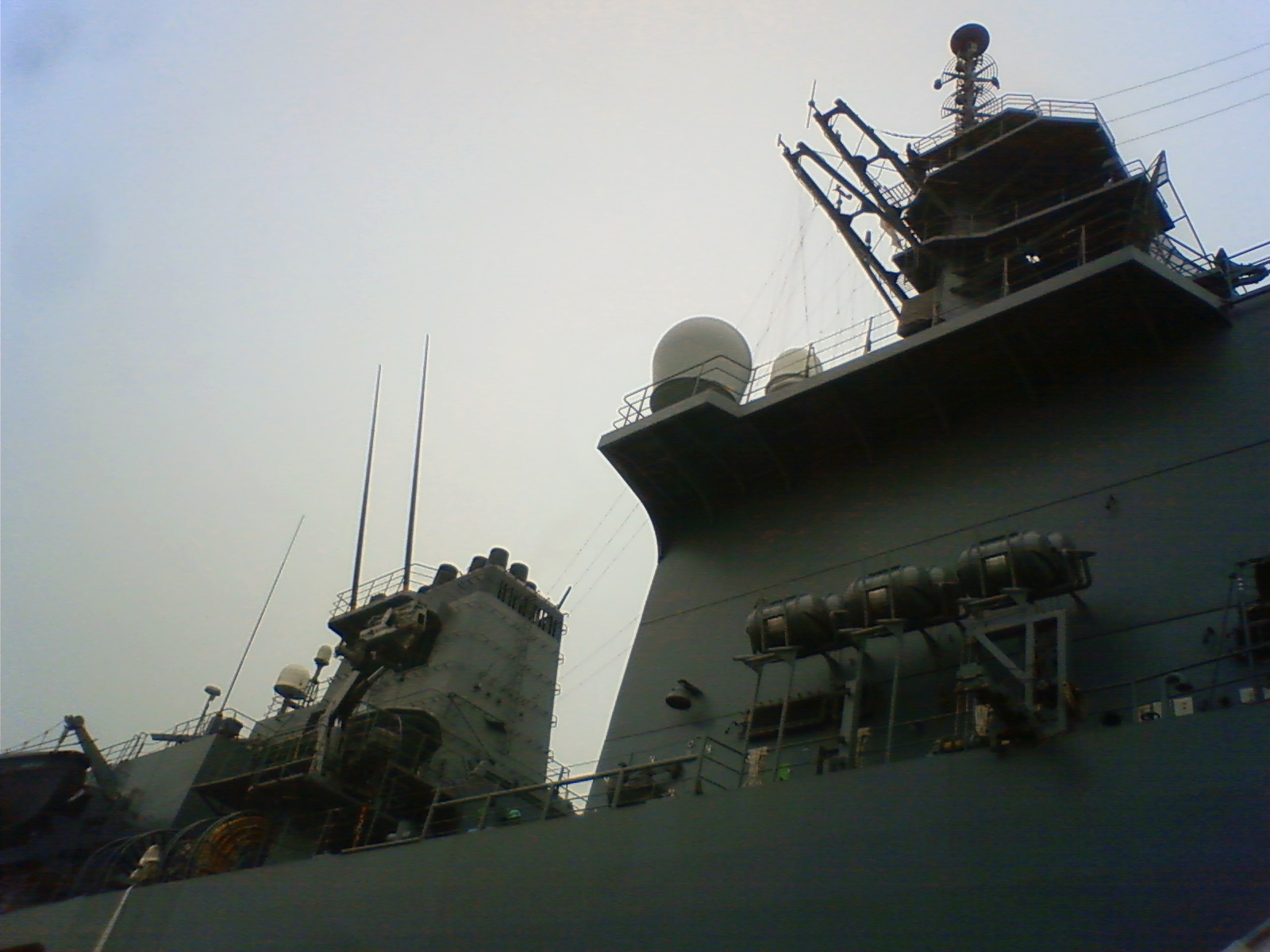
JS Uraga on 4 December 2011.

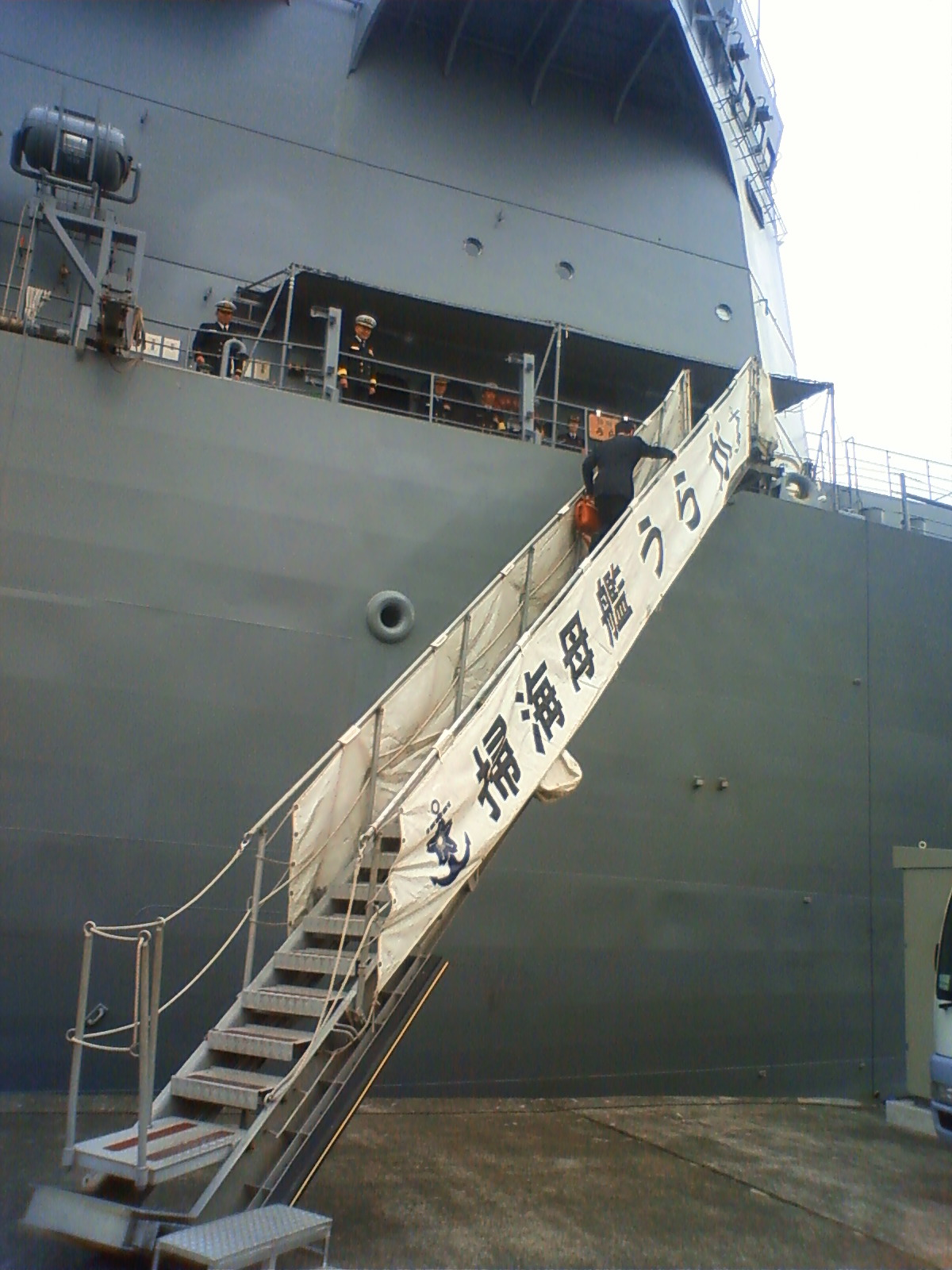
JS Uraga on 4 December 2011.

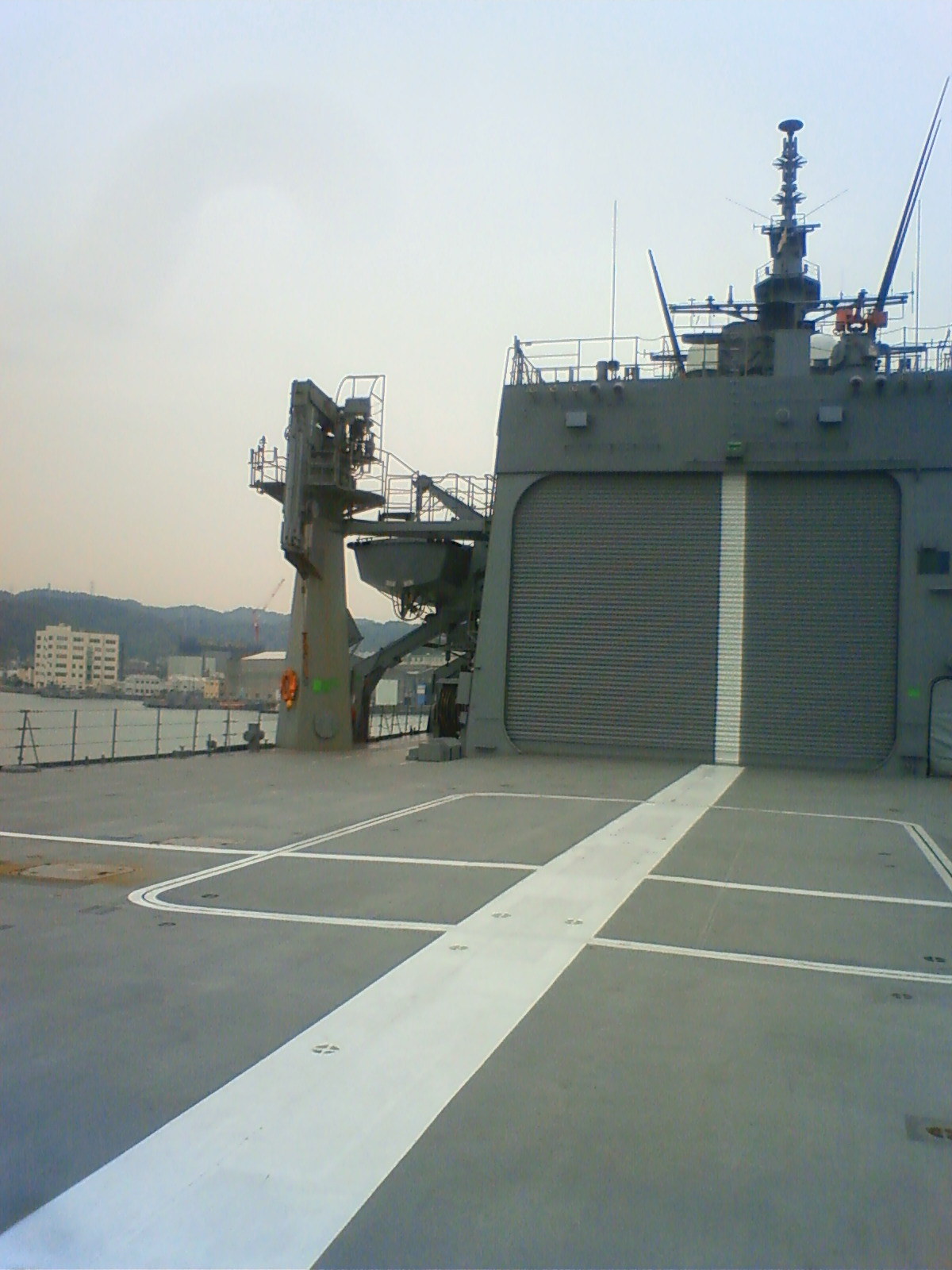
JS Uraga's helipad on 4 December 2011.

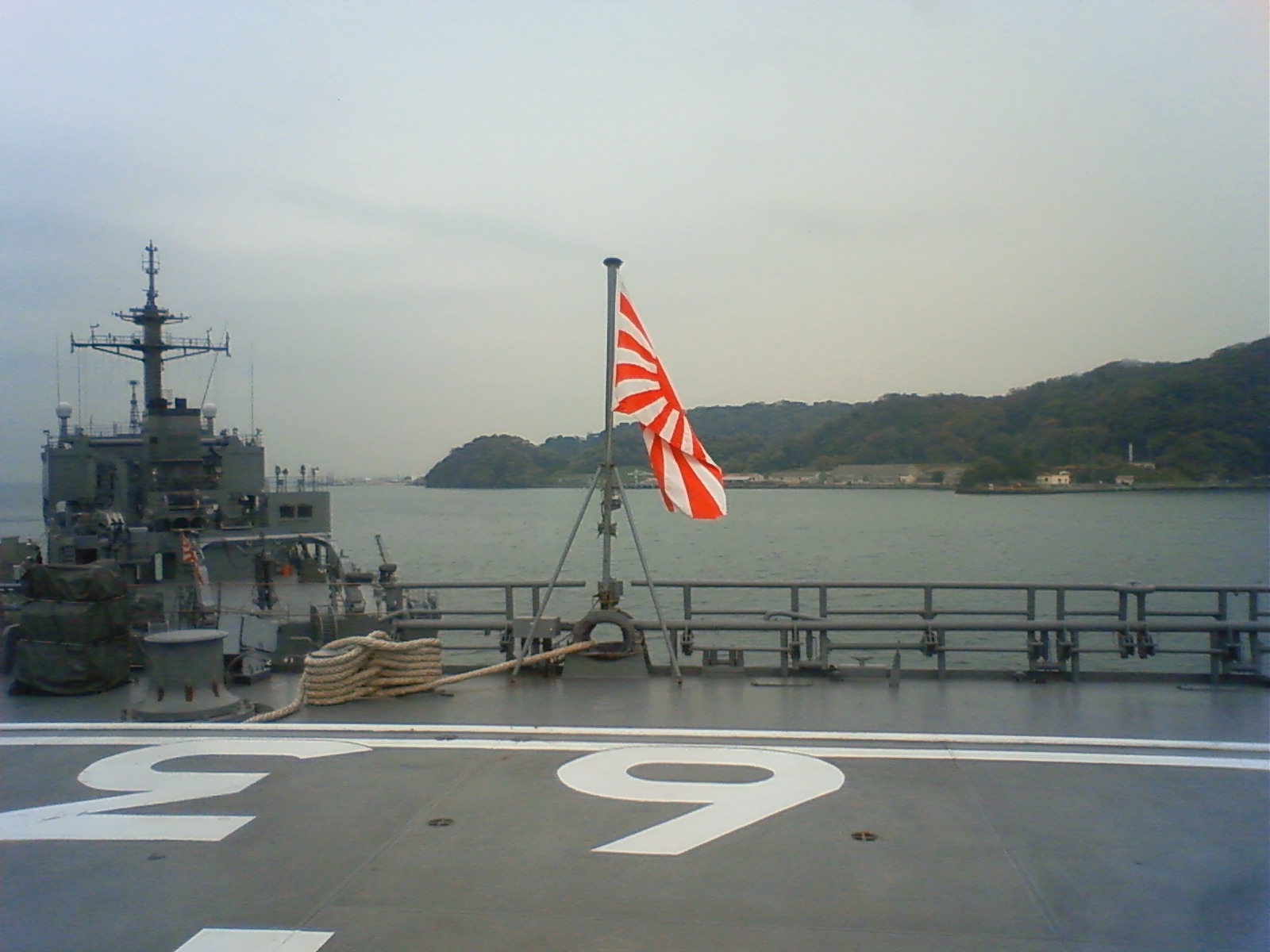
JS Uraga on 4 December 2011.

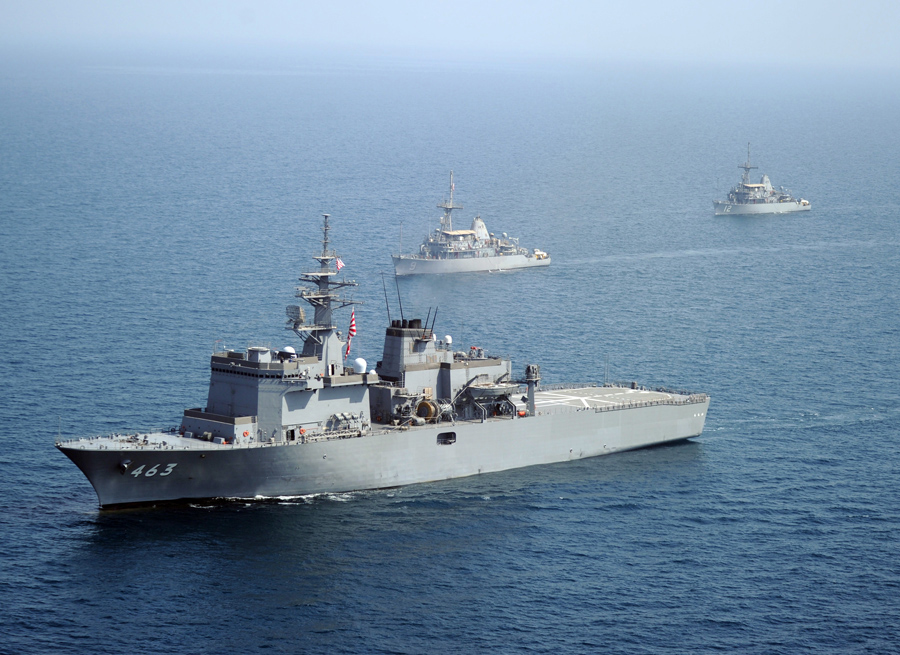
JS Uraga alongside USS Pioneer and USS Ardent on 20 September 2012.

JS Uraga's radar OPS-20 and OPS-14C on 2 June 2013.

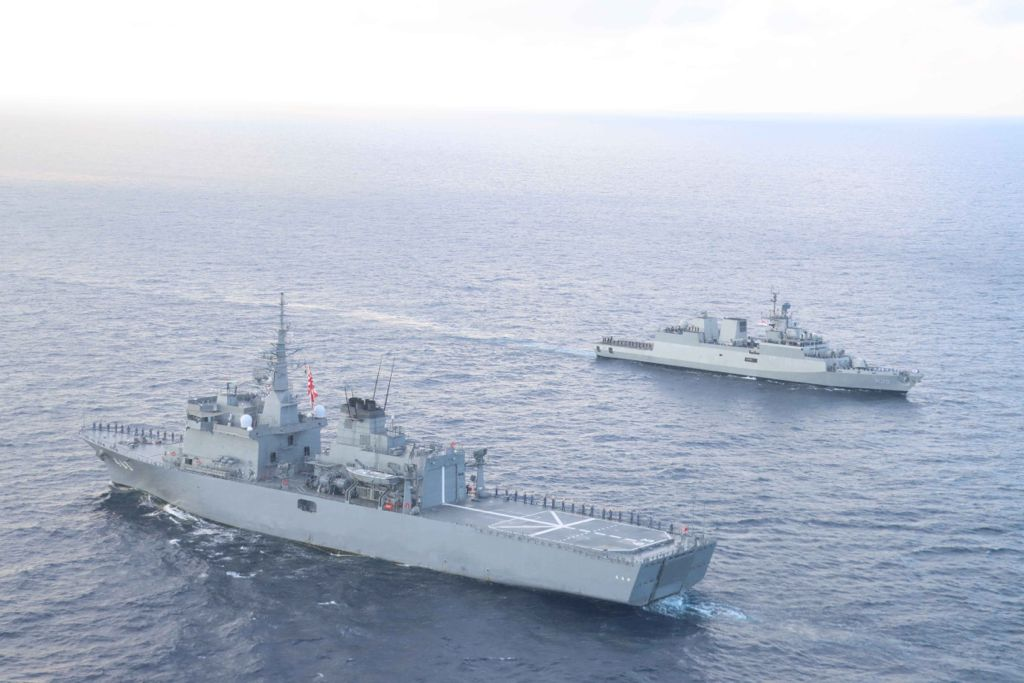
JS Uraga with Kadmatt during an exercise.
