= Japanese ship Tsushima =

Three ships of the Japanese Navy have been named Tsushima:

- Japanese cruiser Tsushima, a Niitaka-class cruiser launched in 1902 and struck in 1936
- Japanese escort ship Tsushima, an Etorofu-class escort ship launched in 1943, she was surrendered to China in 1947 and renamed Lin An
- JS Tsushima (MSO-302), a Yaeyama-class minesweeper launched in 1990 and struck in 2016

== See also ==
- Tsushima Maru, a civilian ship sunk by American naval forces during World War II
- Tsushima (disambiguation)
