= Yaeyama =

Yaeyama may refer to:

- Yaeyama Islands, an archipelago in Okinawa Prefecture, Japan
- Yaeyama District, Okinawa, an administrative division covering most of the Yaeyama Islands
- Yaeyama language, a language spoken in the Yaeyama Islands
- Japanese ship Yaeyama, the name of several ships of the Japanese Navy
- Yaeyama Jofu, a handwoven kimono textile made of ramie
