= Japanese ship Yaeyama =

Yaeyama may refer to one of several naval ships of Japan:

- Japanese cruiser Yaeyama, a Japanese-built cruiser of French design built for the Imperial Japanese Navy; participated in the First Sino-Japanese War and the Russo-Japanese War; scrapped in 1911
- Japanese minelayer Yaeyama, a World War II minelayer in the Imperial Japanese Navy; sunk by American carrier-based aircraft near Palawan Island in September 1944
- JS Yaeyama (MSO-301), the lead ship of the Yaeyama class of wooden-hulled minesweepers for the Japan Maritime Self-Defense Force; launched in 1991
