= JS Tsushima =

Japanese minesweeper

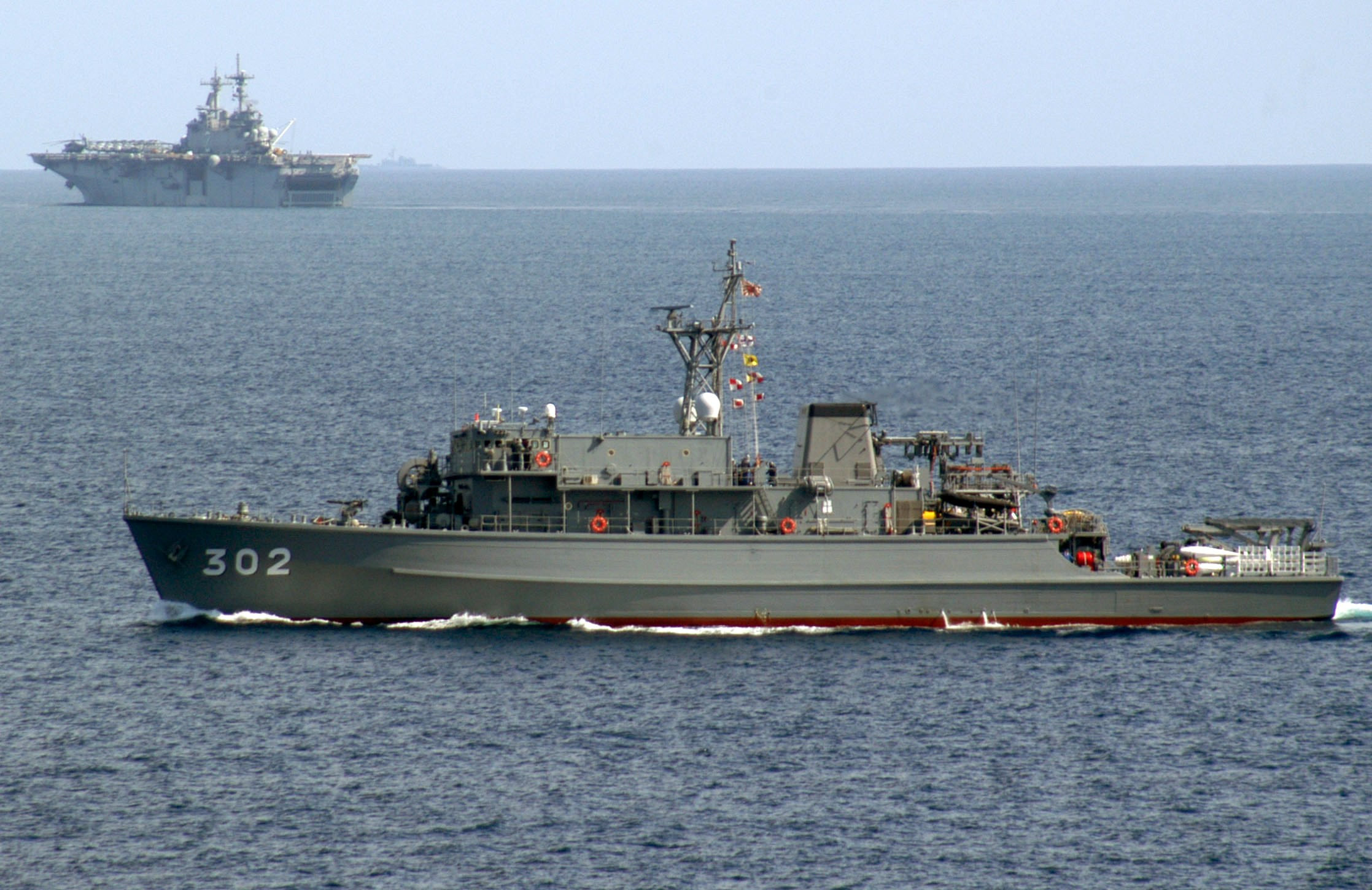
- JS Tsushima with USS Essex (LHD-2) on 12 November 2009.

History

Japan
- Name: Tsushima; (つしま)
- Namesake: Tsushima
- Ordered: 1989
- Builder: Hitachi Zosen Corporation
- Laid down: 20 July 1990
- Launched: 20 September 1991
- Commissioned: 23 March 1993
- Decommissioned: 1 July 2016
- Home port: Yokosuka
- Identification: MSO-302
- Fate: Scrapped

General characteristics
- Class & type: Yaeyama-class minesweeper
- Displacement: 1,000 tons standard (Official); 1,250 tons full load (estimated)
- Length: 67 m (220 ft)
- Beam: 11.8 m (38.7 ft)
- Draft: 3.1 m (10.2 ft)
- Depth: 5.2 m (17 ft)
- Propulsion: Diesel, two Mitsubishi 6NMU-TA1 diesels 2,400 hp (1.76 MW), two shafts; one 350 hp (257 kW) hydrojet bow thruster
- Speed: 14 knots (26 km/h)
- Complement: 60
- Armament: 1 JM-61 Sea Vulcan; Mine-hunting and sweeping equipment

JS Tsushima (MSO-302) was the second ship of the Yaeyama-class minesweepers of the Japanese Maritime Self-Defense Force. She was commissioned on 23 March 1993.

== Development and design ==
The Maritime Self-Defense Force's transport and landing craft unit set up a fleet in 1955 with six general-purpose landing craft (LCUs) and 29 mobile landing craft (LCMs) provided by the U.S. Navy under the MSA Agreement. And. Subsequently, in 1961, based on the MSA agreement, three LST-542 class tank landing ships (LST-1 class final type) retired by the U.S. Navy were donated and started operation as Osumi type transport ships.

The three ships of the same type formed the first transport corps under the control of the Yokosuka District Force, but on May 1, 1962, they were reassigned under the direct control of the Self-Defense Fleet and engaged in maritime transport and maritime operation transport. It was an extremely practical landing ship except for the lack of speed, but all of them were built from 1944 to 1945, and since they will reach the end of their useful life in the 40's of the Showa era, an alternative ship is needed. Was there. For this reason, the design of the 1,500-ton type (45LST), which had been built for the district corps a little earlier, was expanded, and it was built as a 2,000-ton type transport ship for agile operation under the SDF fleet.

== Construction and career ==
She was the second minesweeper of the Maritime Self-Defense Force. The 1989 plan minesweeper No. 302 based on the medium-term defense capability development plan was laid down at the JFE Holdings on July 20, 1990, launched on September 20, 1991, and launched on March 23, 1993. It was put into service, and was incorporated into the 2nd Mine Warfare Force as a ship under direct control and deployed in Yokosuka. On March 23, the same year, the 51st Mine Warfare Force was newly formed under the 2nd Mine Warfare Force, and was incorporated with the second ship JS Yaeyama commissioned on the same day.

On March 13, 2000, the Mine Warfare Force was reorganized due to the reorganization of the Mine Warfare Force, and the 51st Mine Warfare Force was transferred to the Mine Warfare Force.

Departed Yokosuka with JS Uraga on September 8, 2011, and arrived at Da Nang Port in Vietnam and Port Blair in the Andaman Islands of the Indian Ocean for the first time as a JMSDF ship, and at Bahrain Minasalman Port on October 14. After arriving, Japan participated in the "multilateral sweeping training co-sponsored by the United States and the United Kingdom" for the first time in the Persian Gulf off Bahrain from the 15th to the 30th of the same month. Returned to Japan on December 1.

Removed from the register on July 1, 2016. The total cruising distance was 275,396.6NM (about 13 laps of the earth), and the total voyage time was 36,849.7 hours (1536 days).
