= Tsushima =

Tsushima may refer to:

== Places ==
- Tsushima Island, part of Nagasaki Prefecture
  - Tsushima, Nagasaki, a city in Nagasaki Prefecture (coterminous with Tsushima Island)
  - Tsushima Province, a historical province, coterminous with modern Tsushima Subprefecture
  - Tsushima Subprefecture, an administrative subdivision of Nagasaki prefecture (coterminous with Tsushima Island)
  - Tsushima Fuchū Domain, a feudal domain of the early modern period, largely if not entirely contiguous with the Province
- Tsushima Basin, also known as Ulleung Basin, located at the juncture of the Sea of Japan and the Korea Strait
- Tsushima Strait, the eastern channel of the Korea Strait
- Tsushima, Aichi, a city in Aichi Prefecture
- Tsushima, Ehime, a town dissolved in August 2005, formerly located in Ehime Prefecture
- Tsushima Shrine, Aichi Prefecture
- Tsushima Shrine, located in the city of Mitoyo, Kagawa Prefecture and only accessible one day a year in early August

== Events ==
- Battle of Tsushima (1905), also known as the "Sea of Japan Naval Battle", the last sea battle of the Russo-Japanese War
- Tsushima Incident (1861), involving Russia, Japan, and Britain

== Ships ==
- Tsushima Maru, a civilian ship sunk by American naval forces during World War II
- Japanese ship Tsushima, a Japanese shipname used by multiple warships

== People ==
- Fuminori Tsushima (対馬 文紀, born 1969), Japanese bobsledder
- Keiko Tsushima (1926–2012), Japanese actress
- Leo Tsushima, fictional character in the Tsuyokiss video game and anime
- Mitsutoshi Tsushima (born 1974), Japanese football player
- Ryuta Tsushima or Iwakiyama Ryūta (born 1976), Japanese sumo wrestler
- Shuji Tsushima or Osamu Dazai (1909–1948), Japanese author
- Yoshiko Tsushima, fictional character from the media-mix project Love Live! Sunshine!!
- Yūko Tsushima or Tsushima Satoko (born 1947), Japanese fiction writer, essayist and critic
- Yūji Tsushima (born 1930), Japanese politician

== Other uses ==
- Tsushima (game), a 1975 wargame by Game Designers' Workshop
- Ghost of Tsushima, a 2020 action-adventure game by Sucker Punch Productions
- Tsushima brown frog, a species of frog endemic to Japan
- Tsushima cat, a wild cat
- Tsushima Current, a branch of the Kuroshio Current into the Sea of Japan
- Tsushima dialect, a Japanese dialect spoken on Tsushima Island of Nagasaki Prefecture
- Tsushima salamander, a species of salamander endemic to Japan
