= JS Hachijō =

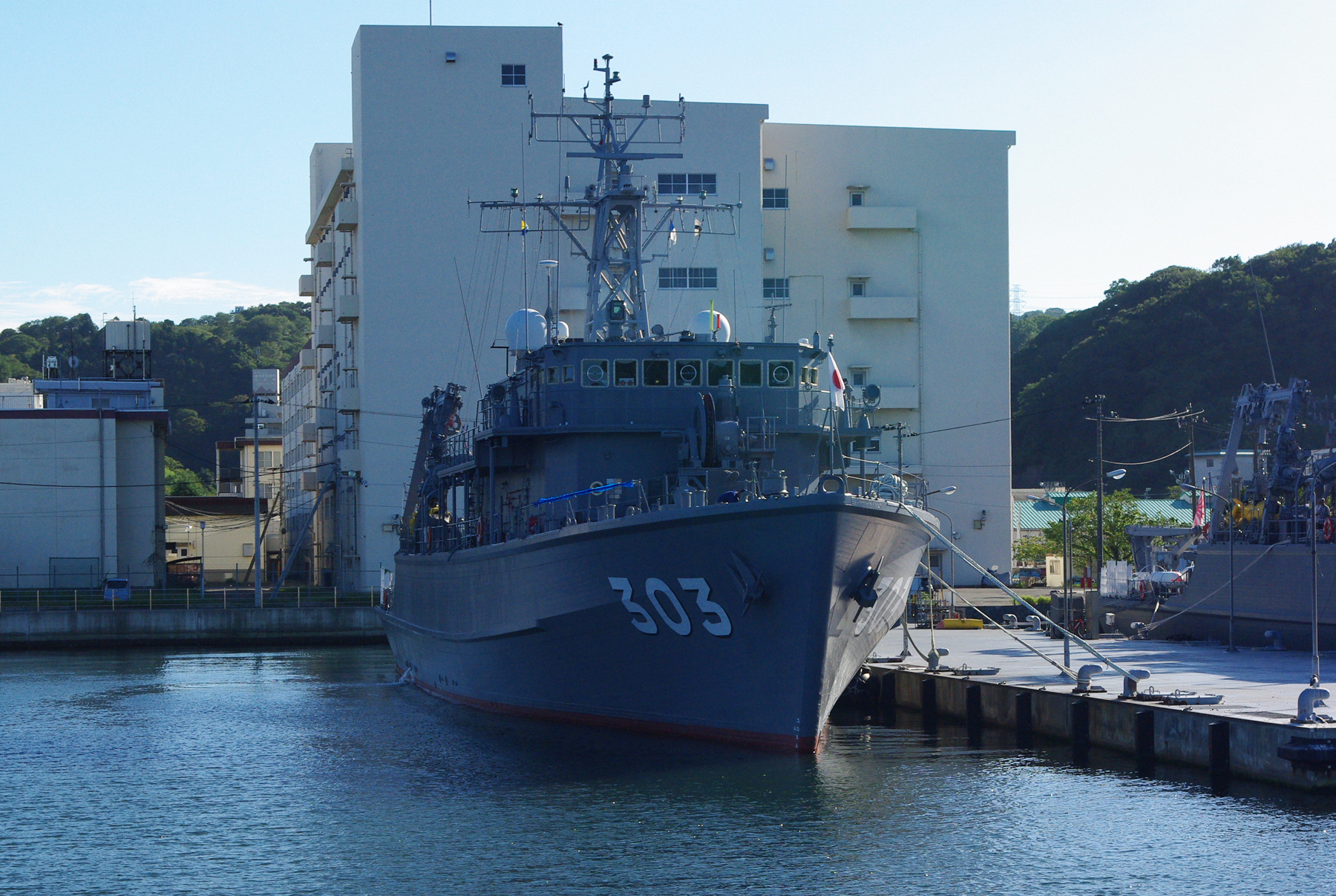
- JS Hachijō at Yokosuka on 11 September 2011.

History

Japan
- Name: Hachijō; (はちじょう)
- Namesake: Hachijō
- Ordered: 1990
- Builder: Hitachi Zosen Corporation
- Laid down: 17 May 1991
- Launched: 15 December 1992
- Commissioned: 24 March 1994
- Decommissioned: 6 June 2017
- Home port: Yokosuka
- Identification: MSO-303
- Fate: Scrapped

General characteristics
- Class & type: Yaeyama-class minesweeper
- Displacement: 1,000 tons standard (Official); 1,250 tons full load (estimated)
- Length: 67 m (220 ft)
- Beam: 11.8 m (38.7 ft)
- Draft: 3.1 m (10.2 ft)
- Depth: 5.2 m (17 ft)
- Propulsion: Diesel, two Mitsubishi 6NMU-TA1 diesels 2,400 hp (1.76 MW), two shafts; one 350 hp (257 kW) hydrojet bow thruster
- Speed: 14 knots (26 km/h)
- Complement: 60
- Armament: 1 JM-61 Sea Vulcan; Mine-hunting and sweeping equipment

JS Hachijō (MSO-303) was the third ship of the Yaeyama-class minesweepers of the Japanese Maritime Self-Defense Force. She was commissioned on 24 March 1994.

== Development and design ==
The Maritime Self-Defense Force's transport and landing craft unit set up a fleet in 1955 with six general-purpose landing craft (LCUs) and 29 mobile landing craft (LCMs) provided by the U.S. Navy under the MSA Agreement. And. Subsequently, in 1961, based on the MSA agreement, three LST-542 class tank landing ships (LST-1 class final type) retired by the U.S. Navy were donated and started operation as Osumi type transport ships.

The three ships of the same type formed the first transport corps under the control of the Yokosuka District Force, but on May 1, 1962, they were reassigned under the direct control of the Self-Defense Fleet and engaged in maritime transport and maritime operation transport. It was an extremely practical landing ship except for the lack of speed, but all of them were built from 1944 to 1945, and since they will reach the end of their useful life in the 40's of the Showa era, an alternative ship is needed. Was there. For this reason, the design of the 1,500-ton type (45LST), which had been built for the district corps a little earlier, was expanded, and it was built as a 2,000-ton type transport ship for agile operation under the SDF fleet.

== Construction and career ==
She was the third minesweeper of the Maritime Self-Defense Force. The 1990 plan minesweeper No. 303 based on the medium-term defense capability development plan was laid down at the JFE Holdings on May 17, 1991, launched on December 15, 1992, and launched on March 24, 1994. It was put into service, and was incorporated into the 2nd Mine Warfare Force as a ship under direct control and deployed in Yokosuka.

On March 13, 2000, the Mine Warfare Force was reorganized due to the reorganization of the Mine Warfare Force, and the 51st Mine Warfare Force was transferred to the Mine Warfare Force.

From April 21 to May 7, 2004, he participated in the second Western Pacific minesweeping training conducted in the waters around Singapore with JS Uraga and JS Ukushima.

From June 5 to 17, 2006, he participated in the 3rd Western Pacific Minesweeping Training conducted in the waters around Malaysia with JS Bungo and JS Aishima.

In response to the Great East Japan Earthquake caused by the 2011 off the Pacific coast of Tohoku Earthquake, Yokosuka departed from Yokosuka for the disaster area, Onagawa Town, Miyagi Prefecture.

Participated in the "US-sponsored international minesweeping training" held in the Persian Gulf from September 16 to 27, 2012 with the minesweeper JS Uraga.

On July 1, 2016, the 51st Mine Warfare Force was abolished due to the reorganization of the Mine Warfare Force, and it was incorporated into the 1st Mine Warfare Force.

Removed from the register on June 6, 2017. The total voyage was 288,190.6NM (about 13.3 laps of the earth), and the total number of voyages was 39,783 hours and 11 minutes (about 1657 days).

== Legacy ==
The JMSDF and the Japanese Navy before it have a long tradition of making curry for its sailors every Friday, with every ship's cook and galley unofficially competing against each other to see who can develop the best recipe. Hachijo's recipe has been recognized in several Yokosuka Curry Festivals as the best curry of the JMSDF.

Hachijō's recipe was featured in Tadashi Ono and Harris Salat's 2013 book, Japanese Soul Cooking, published by Ten Speed Press. It has been quoted as a favorite recipe for curry by other chefs who have tried it.

The recipe also lives on in commercially available curry pouches manufactured by Chomi Shojo, in their set of popular curries from JMSDF ships, and a plaque from Hachijō was given to and is displayed at the Yokosuka Navy Curry Restaurant at Mikasa Park, which serves and sells Chomi Shojo's "Hachijo Curry".
