= JS Bungo =

JMSDF mine countermeasure vessel

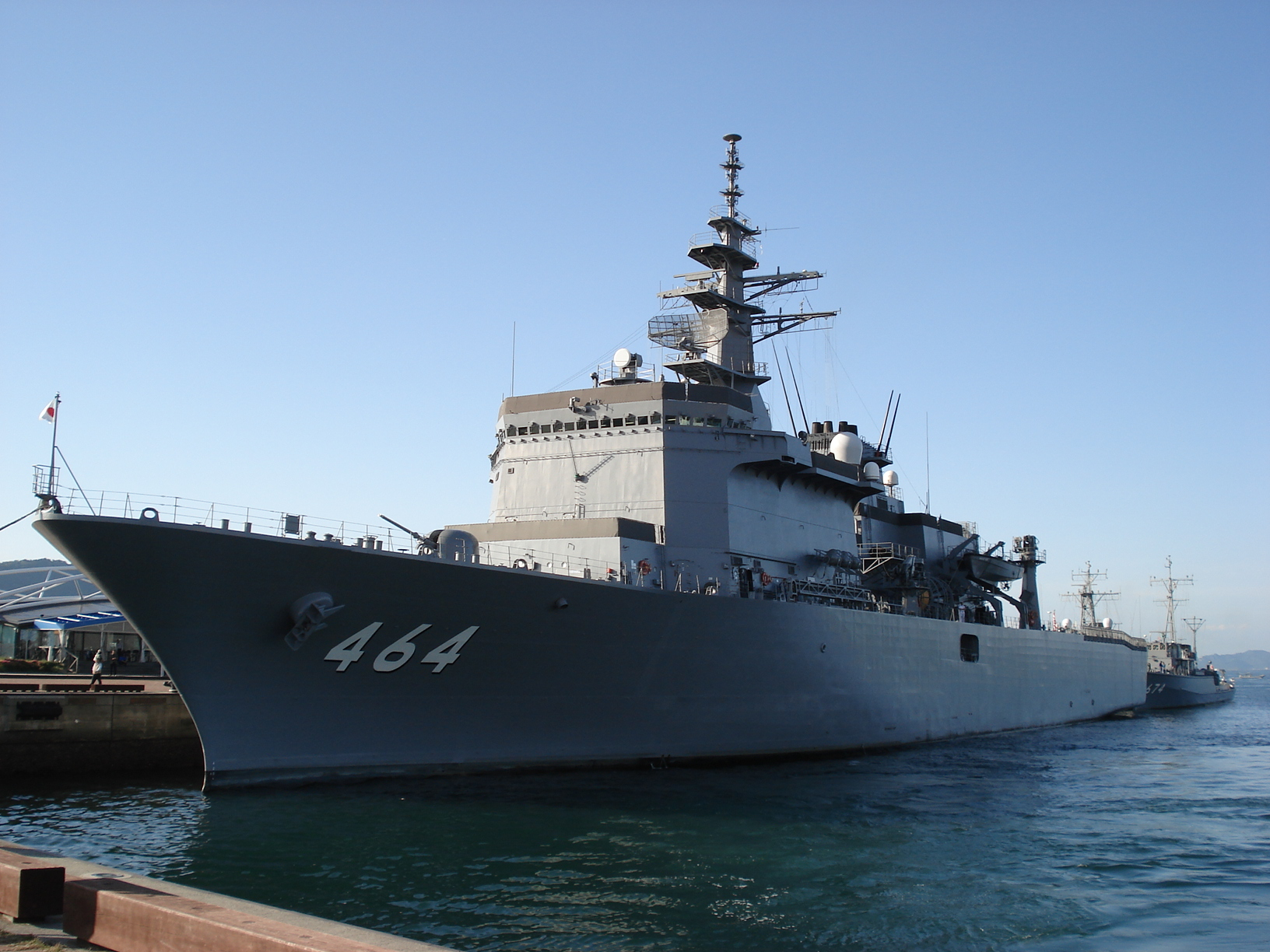
- JS Bungo

History

Japan
- Name: Bungo; (ぶんご)
- Namesake: Bungo
- Ordered: 1995
- Builder: Mitsui, Tamano
- Laid down: 4 July 1996
- Launched: 24 April 1997
- Commissioned: 23 March 1998
- Home port: Yokosuka
- Identification: MMSI number: 431999628; Pennant number: MST-464
- Status: Active

General characteristics
- Class & type: Uraga-class mine countermeasures vessel
- Displacement: 5,650 t (5,560 long tons) standard; 6,850 t (6,740 long tons) full load
- Length: 141 m (463 ft)
- Beam: 22 m (72 ft)
- Draft: 14 m (46 ft)
- Depth: 5.4 m (17 ft 9 in)
- Propulsion: 2 × Mitsui 12V42M-A Diesel; 2 × axes
- Speed: 22 knots (41 km/h; 25 mph)
- Complement: 170
- Sensors & processing systems: OPS-39C; OPS-14C; OPS-20; Type 3 minelaying device; Mk105 aeromagnetic device; Mk104 aeronautical device; Type 81 fire control system; Sonar
- Electronic warfare & decoys: NOLR-8; Mk.137 Decoy launcher
- Armament: 1 × OTO Melara 76mm naval gun; 2 × Oerlikon 20 mm cannon; 2 × M2 Browning
- Aviation facilities: Hangar and helipad

JS Bungo (MST-464) is the second ship of Uraga-class mine countermeasure vessel.

== Construction and career ==
Bungo was laid down at Mitsui Engineering & Shipbuilding Tamano Shipyard on 4 July 1996 and launched on 24 April 1997. She was commissioned on 23 March 1998. She was transferred to the Yokosuka District Force.

Her and multiple other ships departed Kobe Port for Alexandria, Egypt on September 23 with the transport ship JS Ōsumi and the supply ship JS Tokiwa to transport temporary housing as an aid to the damage caused by the northwestern Turkey earthquake that occurred on August 17, 1999. At an average speed of 18 kt (about 33 km / h), she made the first long-distance continuous voyage in the history of the Maritime Self-Defense Force for 23 consecutive days without calling, and entered the port of Haydarpasa in Istanbul on October 19. She was scheduled to arrive at Wu on November 22, but she was in a top-heavy condition due to the empty freshwater tank, and there was a camellia that the arrival was delayed by one day.

On March 13, 2000, due to the reorganization of the minesweeping force, the minesweeping force group was newly formed and incorporated as a ship under direct control.

From June 11 to 22, 2001, she participated in the first Western Pacific minesweeping training conducted in the waters around Singapore with the minesweeper JS Yaeyama and JS Tobishima.

In the 2nd Western Pacific International Submarine Rescue Training Pacific Reach held in April 2002, Masao Kobayashi, commander of the 1st Submarine Group, and below used it as a flagship. She provides many officers' living quarters on the bridge to the participating Navy liaison officers and crew members, and also briefs every morning to inform the participating ships, demonstrating habitability and command ability. She leaves Japan on April 22 and returns on May 2.

From June 5 to 17, 2006, he participated in the 3rd Western Pacific Minesweeper Training conducted in the waters around Malaysia with JS Hachijo and JS Aishima.

During the Great East Japan Earthquake that occurred on March 11, 2011, he participated in rescue activities. At the time of the disaster, she was berthed at Katsuren in Okinawa for joint training scheduled to be held in Singapore, and she departed urgently with 10 underwater divers from the Okinawa Underwater Disposal Corps and headed for Yokosuka. In the evening of March 13, a total of 130 underwater disposers and 12 rubber boats of the underwater disposal team to which the 1st, 2nd, and 44th Mine Warfare Forces, which had arrived in Yokosuka and gathered in Yokosuka, belonged. They loaded emergency food and blankets and left Yokosuka at 9 pm. After arriving at the site, they transported supplies and assisted the victims in bathing [2], and Bungo EOD (underwater disposer) searched for the missing person and recovered the body until May 20.

On September 8, the same year, she left Yokosuka to participate in a multilateral minesweeping training with the US Navy and Royal Navy around Bahrain. She participated in the training from October 15 to October 30 and returned to Yokosuka on December 1.

From June 29 to August 3, 2012, she participated in the RIMPAC 2012 exercise in the waters around Hawaii with the escort ship JS Shirane and JS Myōkō. This was the first Maritime Self-Defense Force dispatch of a mine warfare unit to RIMPAC.

On September 1, 2013, Bungo collided with a fishing boat while sailing in the Seto Inland Sea. The damage was minor, with no injuries and no flooding or oil spills.

From October 27 to November 13, 2014, she participated in the 3rd US-sponsored international minesweeping training held in the waters around the Arabian Peninsula with JS Yaeyama.

From March 27 to March 31, 2015, she hosted with the RSS Resolution that visited Kure. From August 14 to September 14 of the same year, she participated in the 6th Western Pacific Minesweeper Training (6th WPMCMEX2015) sponsored by the Singapore Navy and the Indonesian Navy with the minesweepers JS Aishima and JS Shishima.

On July 1, 2016, due to the reorganization of the Mine Warfare Force, the ships under the direct control of the group were abolished, and they were transferred to the 3rd Mine Warfare Force, which was newly formed on the same date.

On July 26, 2017, joint training was conducted with the USS Pioneer in Mutsu Bay. The purpose is to confirm communication procedures for the protection of US ships based on the peace and security legislation.

For about three months from September 15, 2019, she will be dispatched to the Indian Ocean along with the minesweeper JS Takashima to conduct maritime training with the navies of each country in the Indian Ocean region. During her dispatch, she will visit Bangladesh, India, Malaysia, Maldives, Philippines, and Vietnam to conduct minesweeping training, diving training, etc.

In February 2025, during International Maritime Exercise 2025, members of the Royal Navy's Mine and Threat Exploitation Group (MTXG) were stationed aboard Bungo in the seas around the Middle East. Members of MTXG X-Ray Unit 1 and 3 were operating REMUS 300 Autonomous Underwater Vehicles to demonstrate interoperational capability. 42 Commando Royal Marines were also aboard for boarding operation training.

On 1 April 2025, Bungo along with JS Etajima arrived at the Port of Colombo, Sri Lanka for a goodwill visit scheduled to last until 4 April.

== Gallery ==
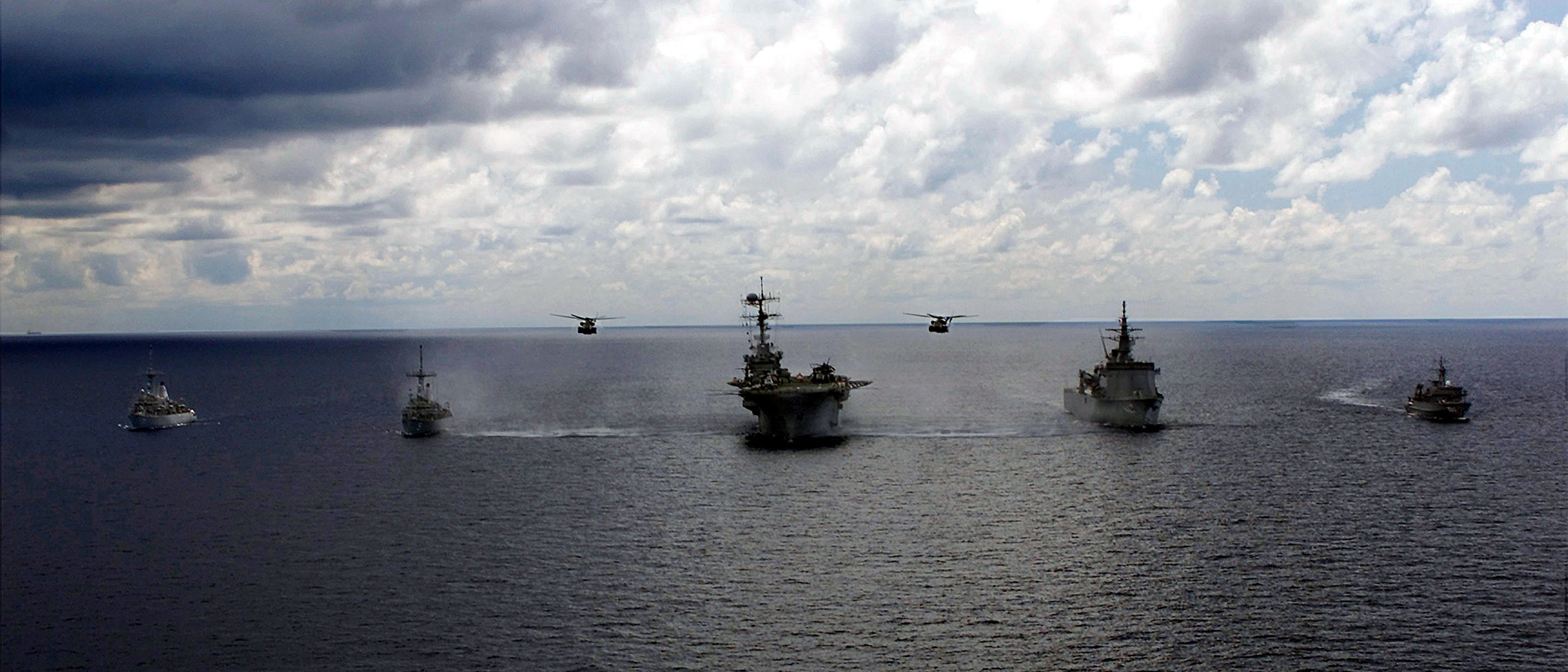
JS Bungo, JS Yaeyama, USS Patriot, USS Inchon and USS Guardian on 7 June 2001.

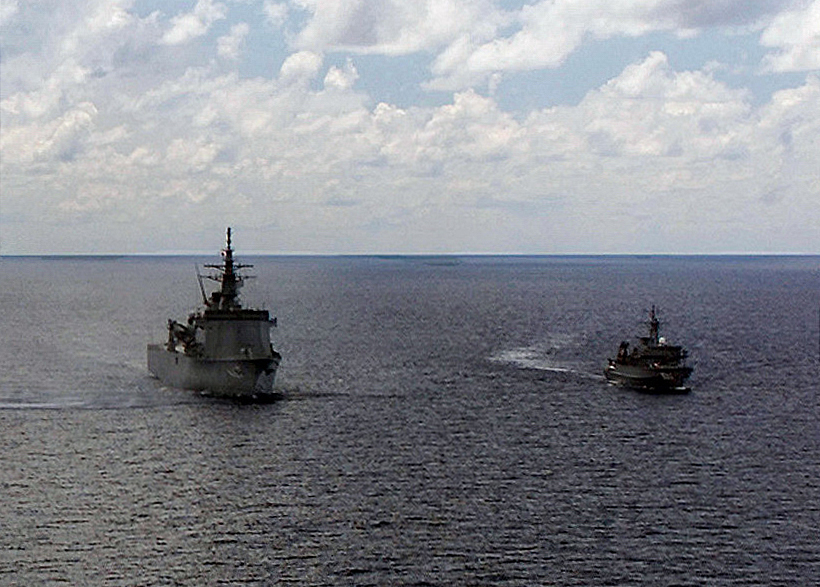
JS Bungo and JS Yaeyama on 7 June 2001.

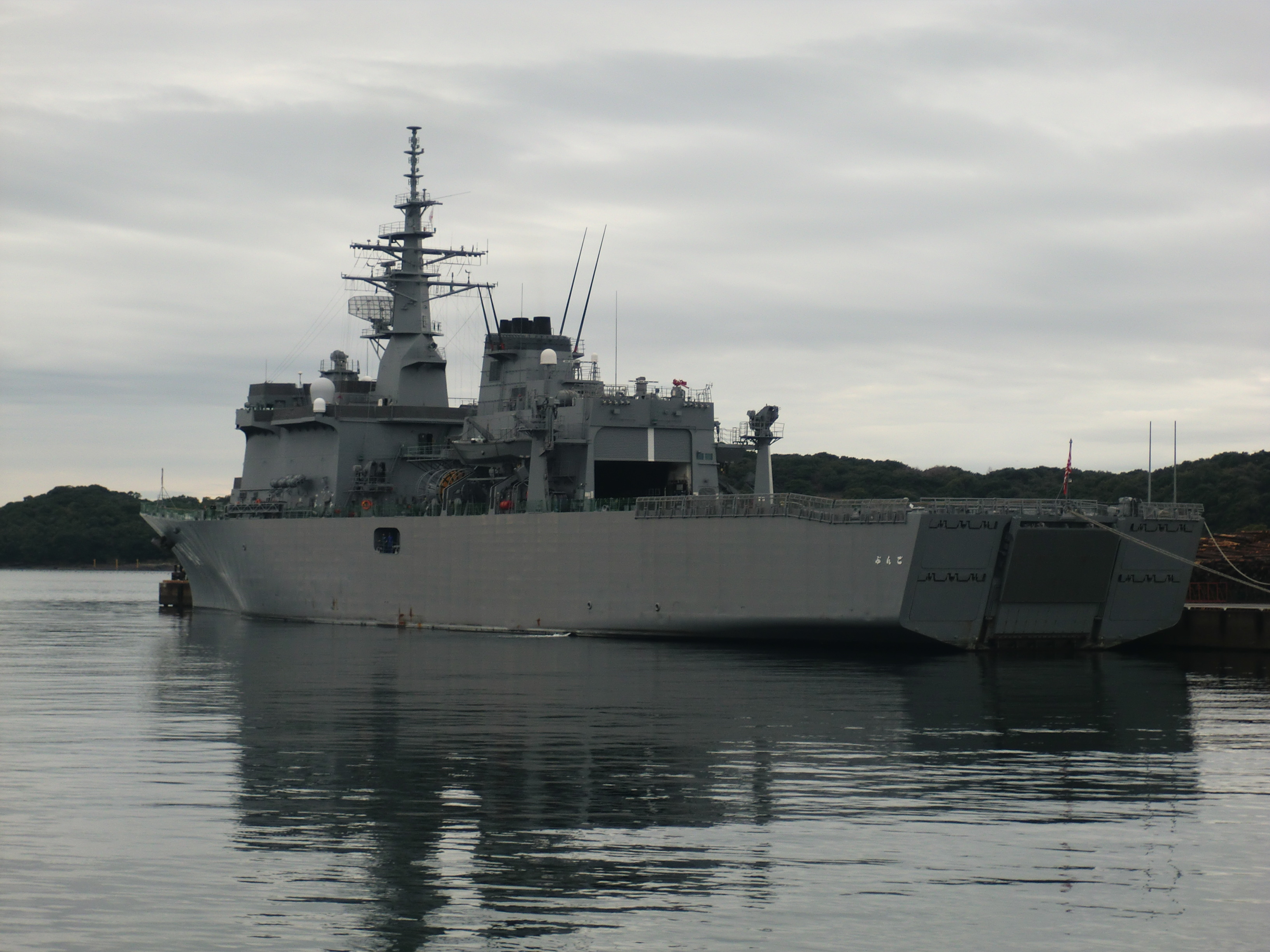
JS Bungo on 14 February 2012.

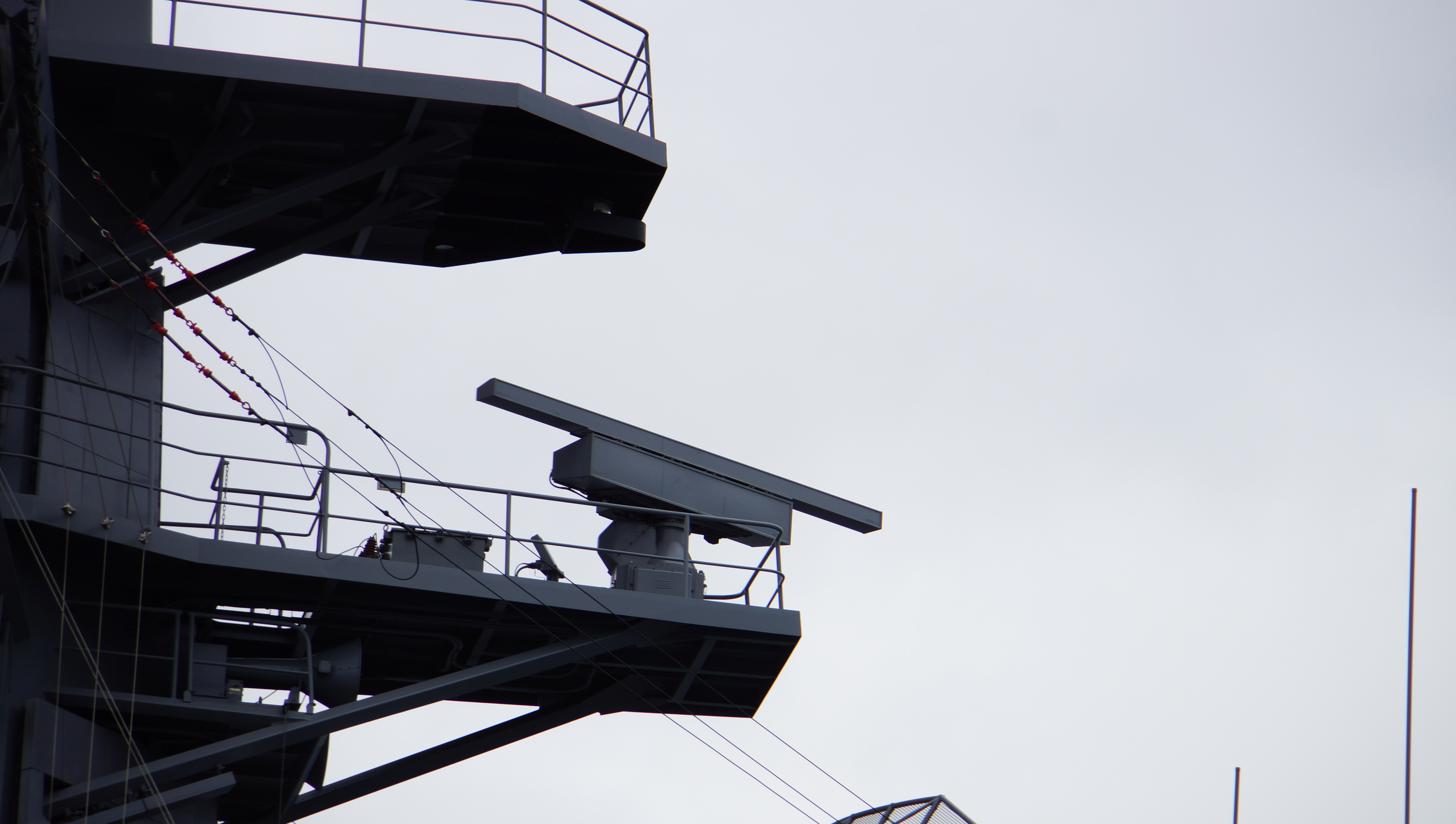
JS Bungo's radar OPS-20 on 15 September 2014.

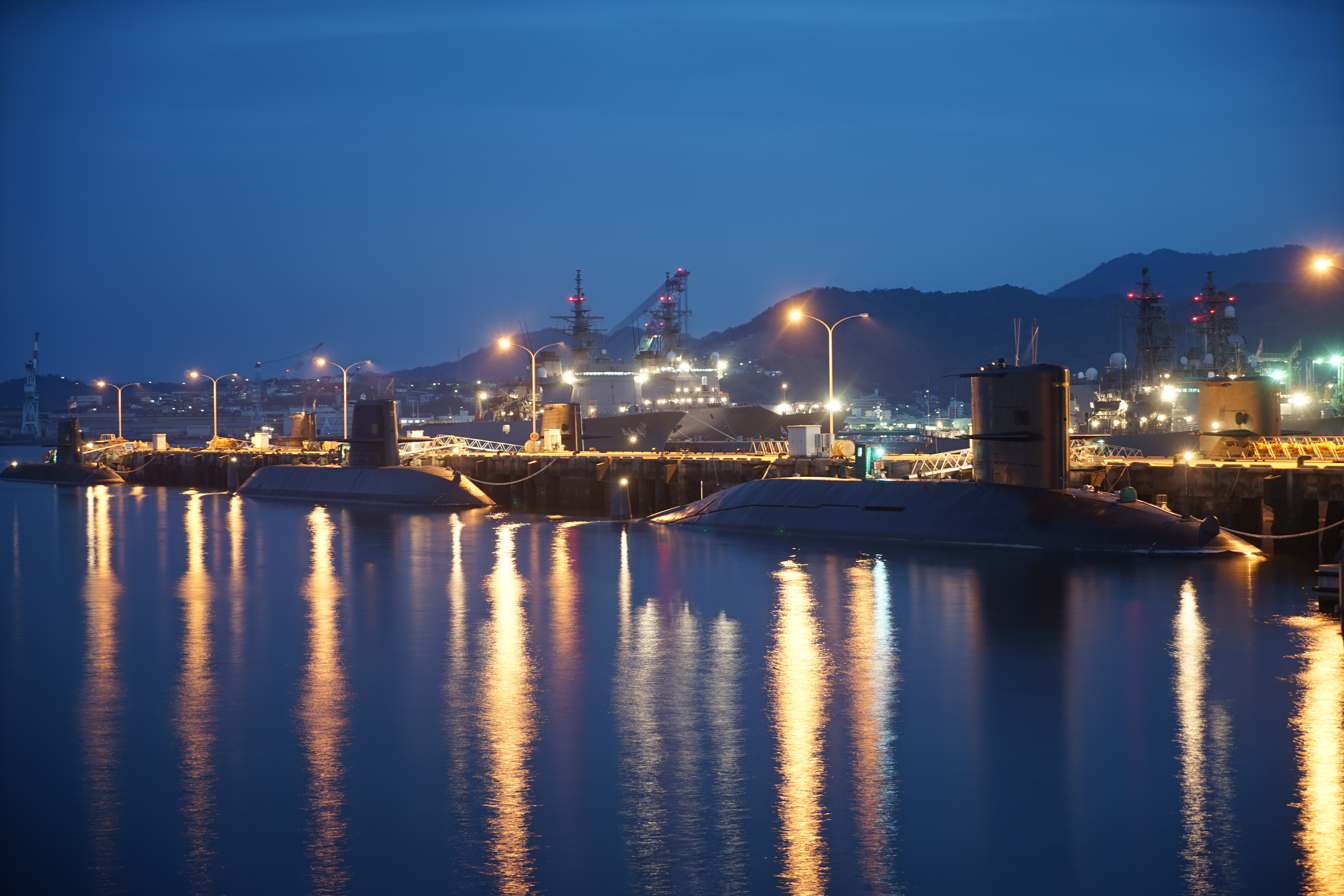
JS Bungo on 28 December 2014.

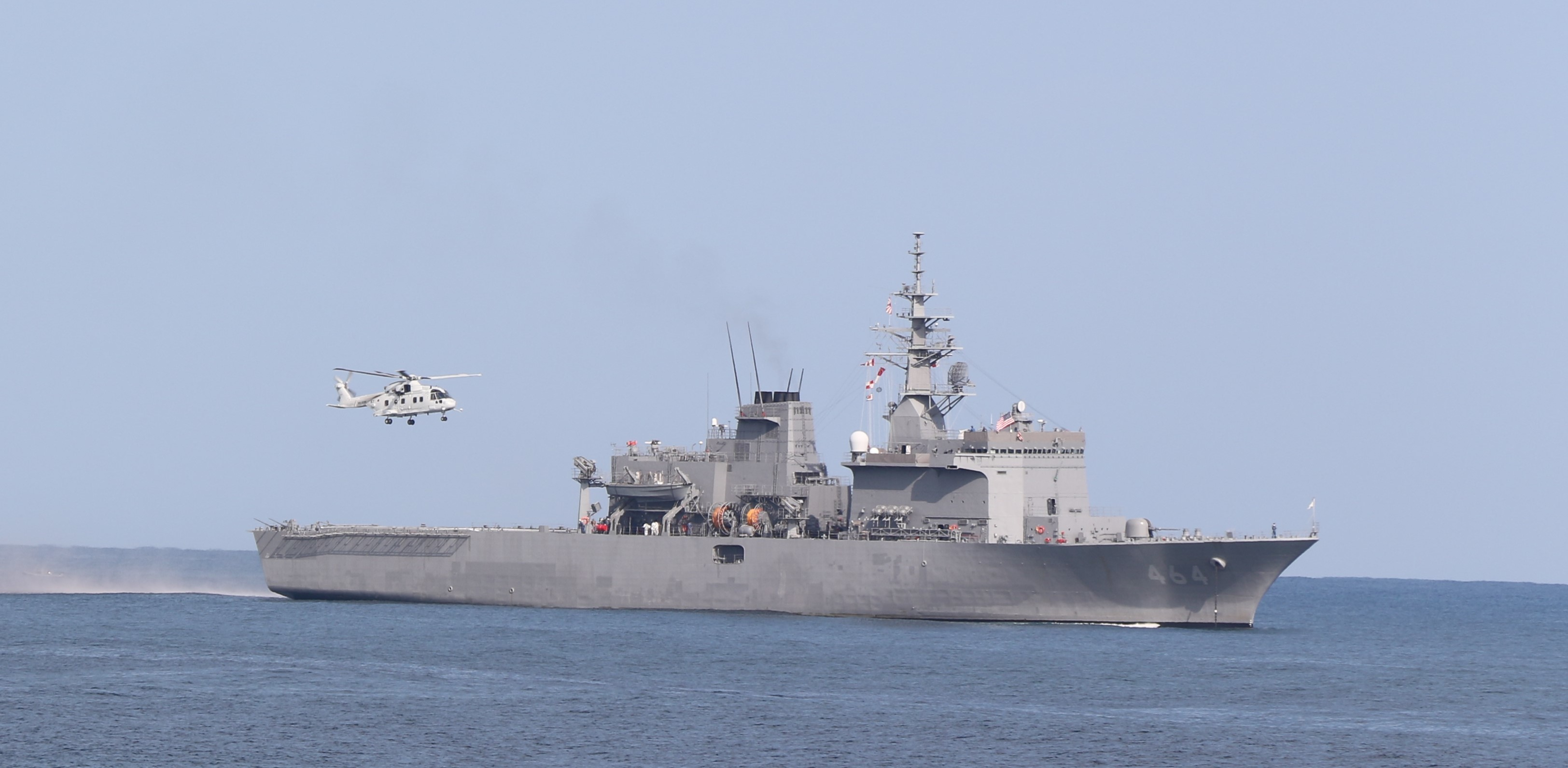
JS Bungo on 22 November 2020.
