= JS Yaeyama =

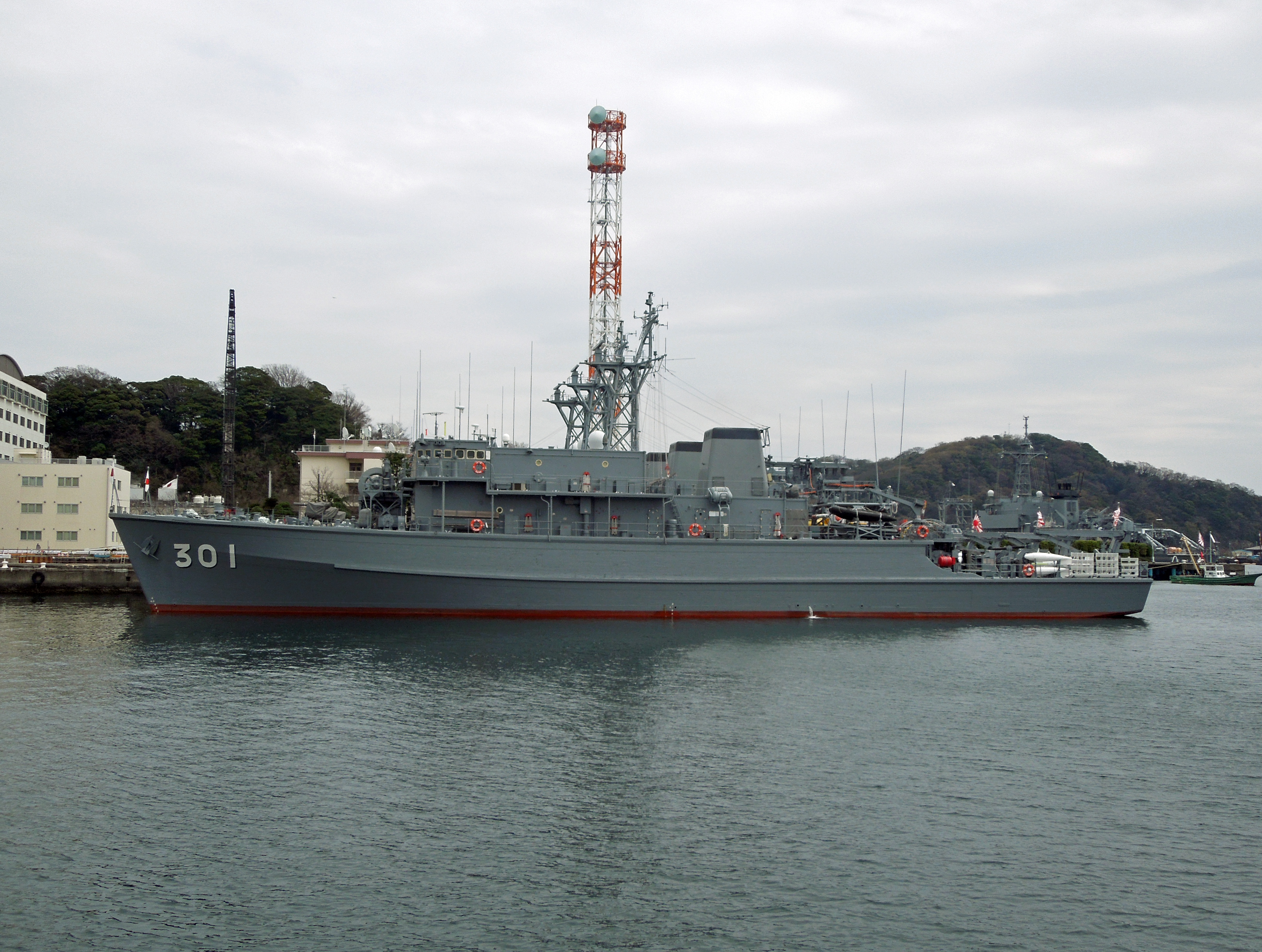
- JS Yaeyama at Yokosuka on 21 March 2016.

History

Japan
- Name: Yaeyama; (やえやま)
- Namesake: Yaeyama
- Ordered: 1989
- Builder: Hitachi Zosen Corporation
- Laid down: 30 August 1990
- Launched: 29 August 1991
- Commissioned: 16 March 1993
- Decommissioned: 28 June 2016
- Home port: Yokosuka
- Identification: MSO-301
- Fate: Scrapped

General characteristics
- Class & type: Yaeyama-class minesweeper
- Displacement: 1,000 tons standard (Official); 1,250 tons full load (estimated)
- Length: 67 m (220 ft)
- Beam: 11.8 m (38.7 ft)
- Draft: 3.1 m (10.2 ft)
- Depth: 5.2 m (17 ft)
- Propulsion: Diesel, two Mitsubishi 6NMU-TA1 diesels 2,400 hp (1.76 MW), two shafts; one 350 hp (257 kW) hydrojet bow thruster
- Speed: 14 knots (26 km/h)
- Complement: 60
- Armament: 1 JM-61 Sea Vulcan; Mine-hunting and sweeping equipment

JS Yaeyama (MSO-301) was the lead ship of the Yaeyama-class minesweepers of the Japanese Maritime Self-Defense Force. She was commissioned on 16 March 1993.

== Development and design ==
The Maritime Self-Defense Force's transport and landing craft unit set up a fleet in 1955 with six general-purpose landing craft (LCUs) and 29 mobile landing craft (LCMs) provided by the U.S. Navy under the MSA Agreement. And. Subsequently, in 1961, based on the MSA agreement, three LST-542 class tank landing ships (LST-1 class final type) retired by the U.S. Navy were donated and started operation as Osumi type transport ships.

The three ships of the same type formed the first transport corps under the control of the Yokosuka District Force, but on May 1, 1962, they were reassigned under the direct control of the Self-Defense Fleet and engaged in maritime transport and maritime operation transport. It was an extremely practical landing ship except for the lack of speed, but all of them were built from 1944 to 1945, and since they will reach the end of their useful life in the 40's of the Showa era, an alternative ship is needed. Was there. For this reason, the design of the 1,500-ton type (45LST), which had been built for the district corps a little earlier, was expanded, and it was built as a 2,000-ton type transport ship for agile operation under the SDF fleet.

== Construction and career ==
She was the first minesweeper of the Maritime Self-Defense Force. The 1989 plan minesweeper No. 301 based on the medium-term defense capability development plan was laid down at the Hitachi Shipbuilding Kanagawa Plant on August 30, 1990, launched on August 29, 1991, and launched on March 16, 1993. It was put into service, and was incorporated into the 2nd Mine Warfare Force as a ship under direct control and deployed in Yokosuka. On March 23, the same year, the 51st Mine Warfare Force was newly formed under the 2nd Mine Warfare Force, and was incorporated with the second ship JS Tsushima commissioned on the same day.

On March 13, 2000, the Mine Warfare Force was reorganized due to the reorganization of the Mine Warfare Force, and the 51st Mine Warfare Force was transferred to the Mine Warfare Force.

From June 11 to 22, 2001, she participated in the first western Pacific minesweeping training conducted in the waters around Singapore with the minesweeper JS Bungo and the minesweeper JS Tobishima.

Departed from Yokosuka for disaster relief in response to the Great East Japan Earthquake caused by the 2011 off the Pacific coast of Tohoku Earthquake.

From October 27 to November 13, 2014, he participated in the 3rd US-sponsored international minesweeping training conducted in the waters around the Arabian Peninsula with the minesweeper JS Bungo.

She was decommissioned on June 28, 2016. The total cruising distance was 281,784.5 NM (about 13 laps of the earth), and the total number of voyages was 38,504.0 hours (1605 days).

== Gallery ==
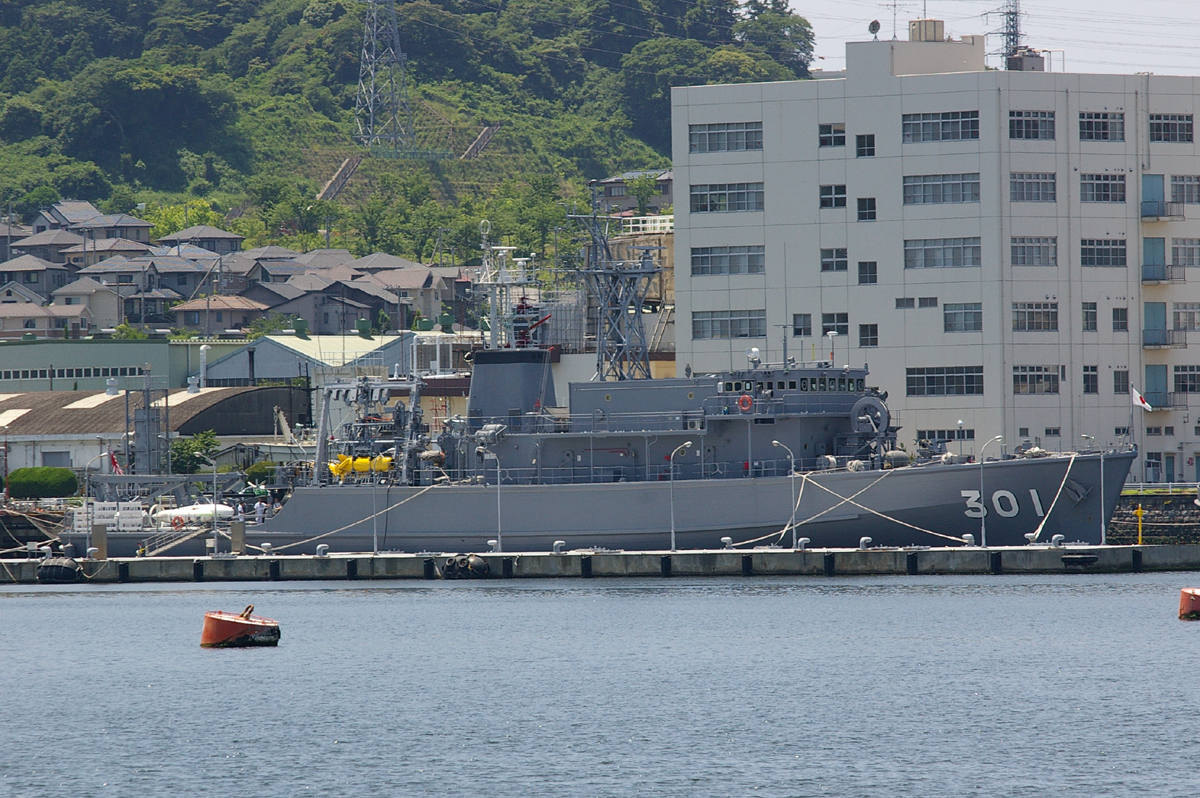
JS Yaeyama at Yokosuka on 17 June 2007.

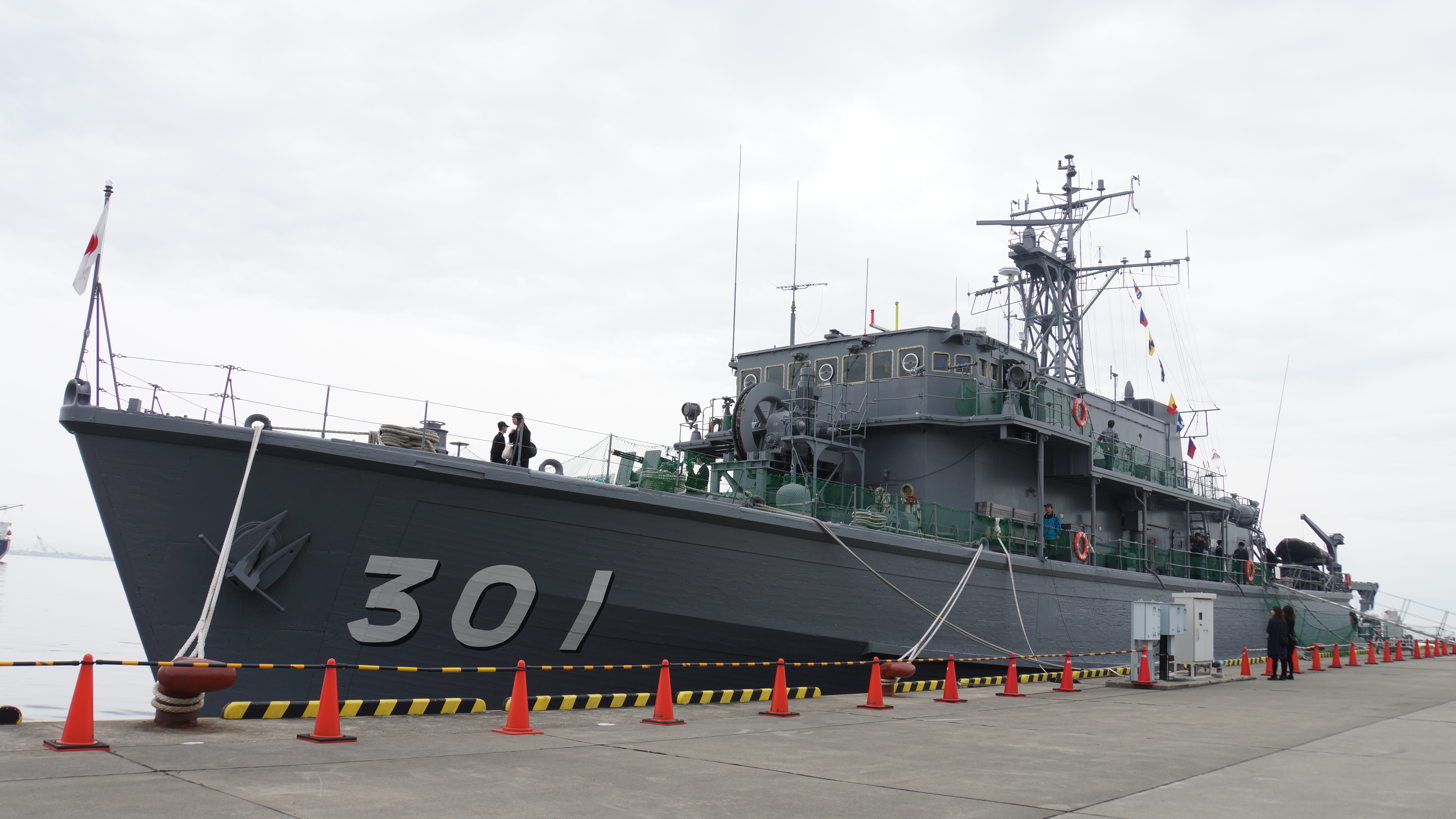
JS Yaeyama at Hanshin Naval Base on 6 March 2016.

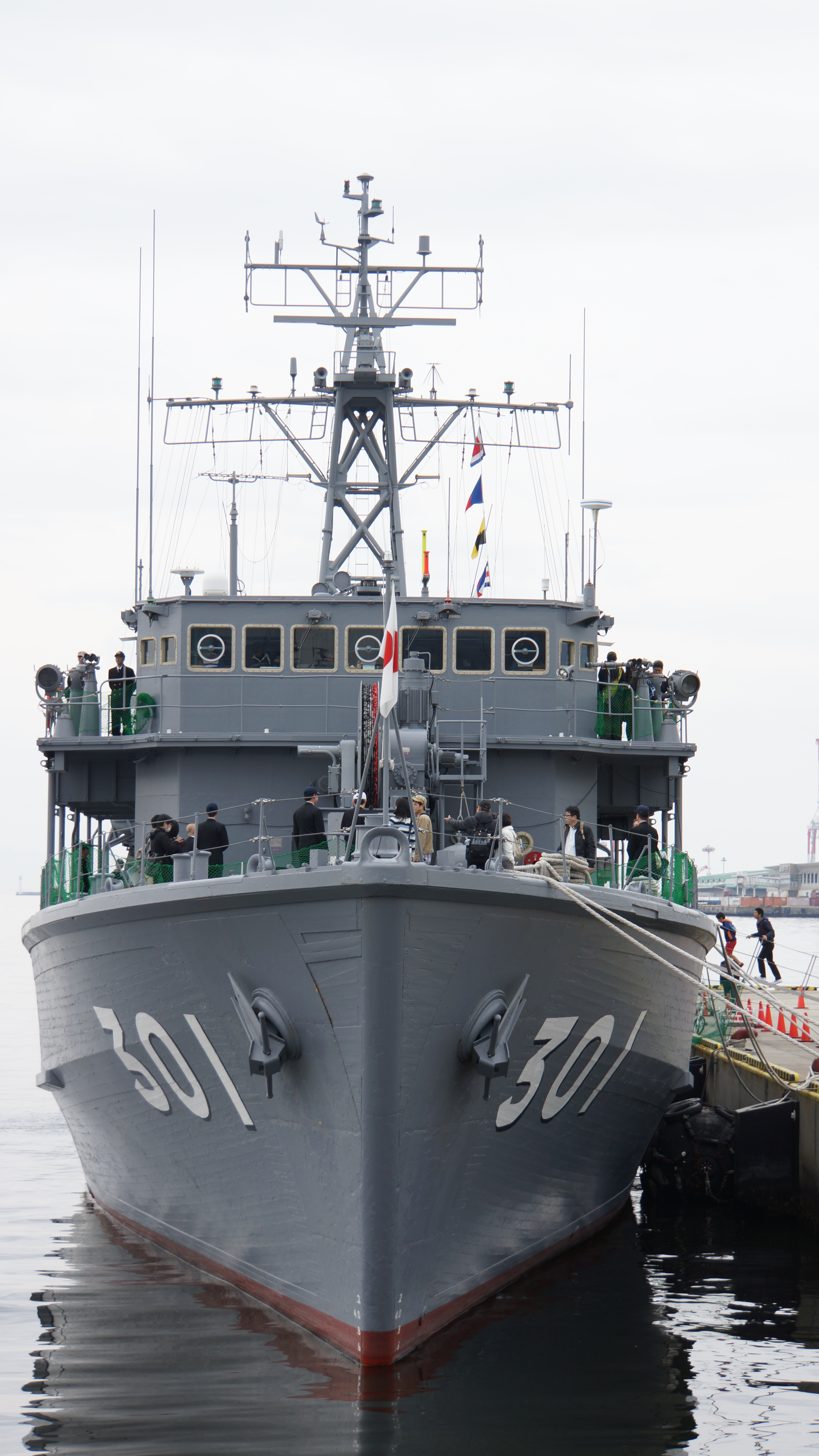
JS Yaeyama at Hanshin Naval Base on 6 March 2016.

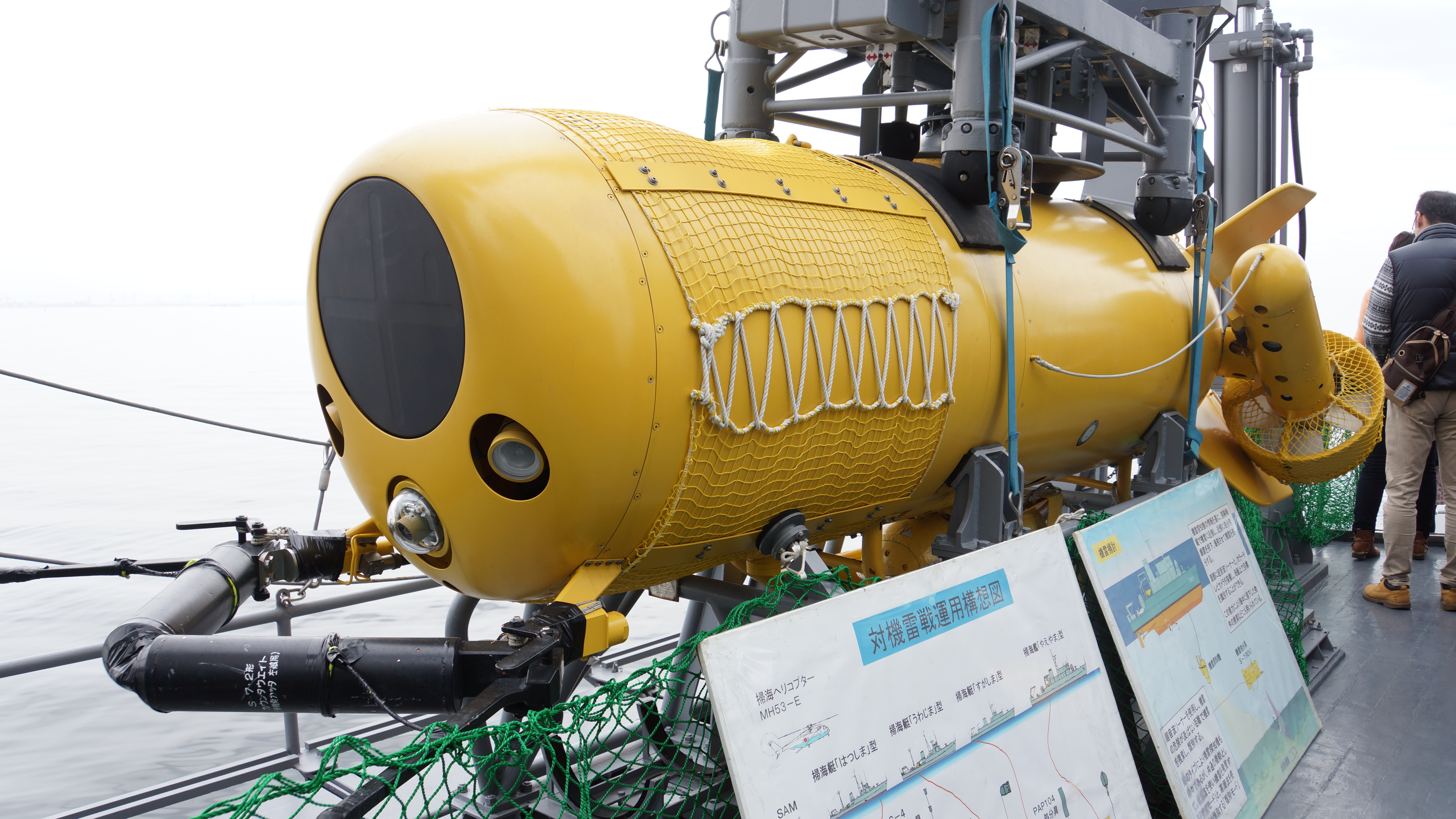
JS Yaeyama’s S-7 Typellin on 6 March 2016.

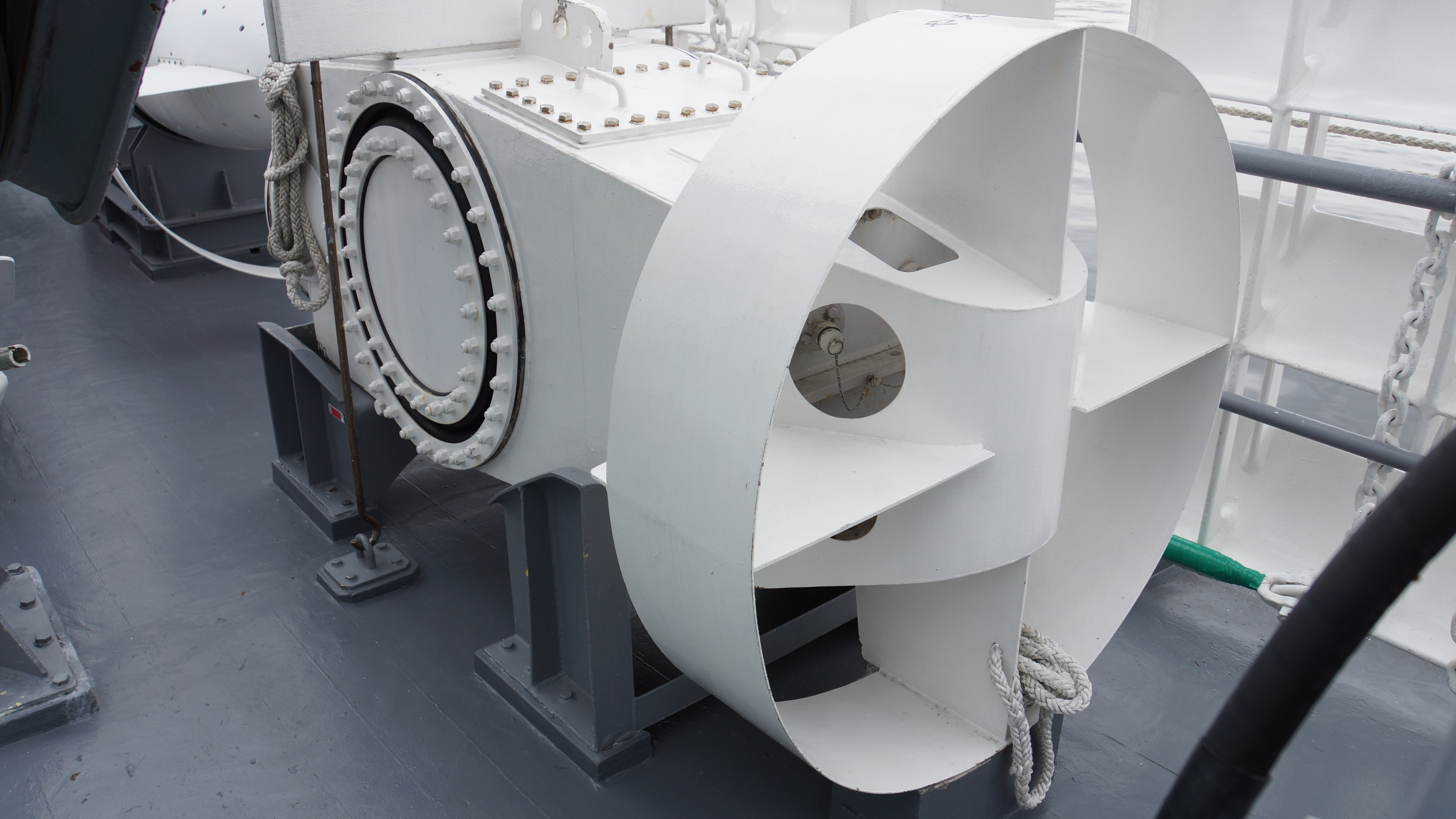
JS Yaeyama’s S-2 Kai 1 Acoustic Sweep on 6 March 2016.
