= Mina Salman =

Mina Salman Port
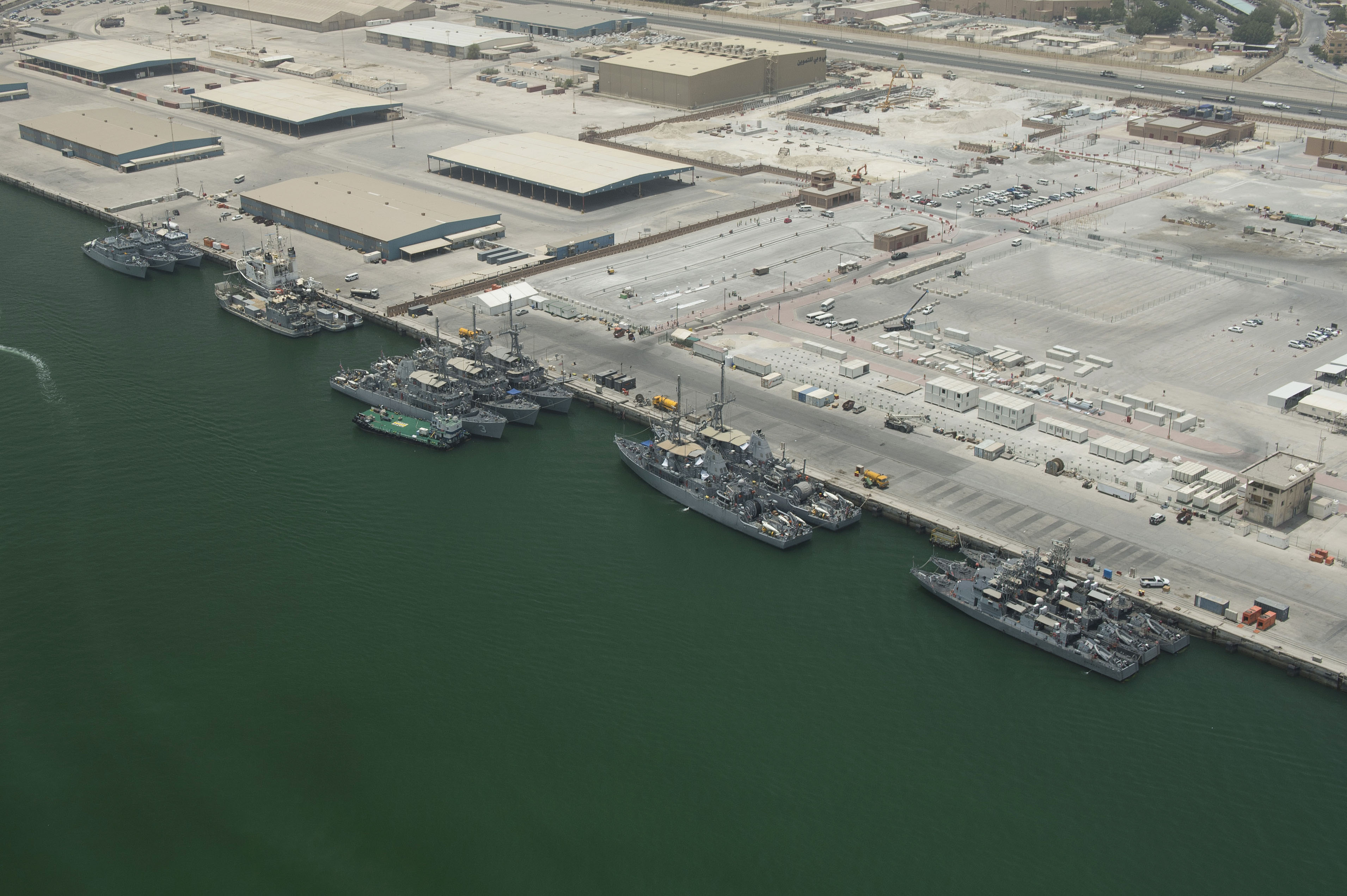
- Interactive map of Mina Salman Port

Location
- Country: Bahrain
- Location: Manama
- Coordinates: 26.201°N 50.607°E
- UN/LOCODE: BHMIN

Details
- Opened: 1962
- Operated by: General Organisation of Sea Ports — Bahrain
- Type of Harbor: Natural
- Land area: 80 hectares
- No. of berths: 15

Statistics
- Annual cargo tonnage: 2.5 million
- Annual revenue: BD 49,854 _{2009}
- Website; Mina Salman Port

Mina Salman (Arabic: ميناء سلمان ) is a seaport located in Manama, Bahrain. Mina Salman was a natural harbour prior to the establishment in 1962 of the port covering 80 hectares. It is the primary cargo port and customs point of Bahrain. The port has 15 container berths, enabling it to handle 2.5 million tonnes of cargo a year.

The port is part of the Maritime Silk Road that runs from the Chinese coast to the south via the southern tip of India to Mombasa, from there through the Red Sea via the Suez Canal to the Mediterranean, there to the Upper Adriatic region to the northern Italian hub of Trieste with its rail connections to Central Europe, Eastern Europe and the North Sea.

== Naming ==
The port is named after Salman bin Hamad Al Khalifa I, the grandfather of the current King.

== History ==
The Manama harbour, where Mina Salman is now located, was first mentioned in Islamic texts that have been dated to 1345 AD. The area was occupied in 1521 by the Portuguese, and the Persians gained control in 1602. The current Al Khalifa dynasty have ruled the country since 1783. The harbour was not suitable for ocean liners, with reports of ships having to anchor up to 6 km offshore. Approach channels were built in 1954, and a pier was built in 1956, which was mainly used by dhows. In 1958, it became a free port and in 1962, a deep water wharf composed of six berths was constructed. The wharf allowed cargo to be directly loaded onto the port for the first time. In the 1960s, the port had refrigeration, storage facilities and equipment for handling large ships.

In 1975, 1.5 million tonnes of cargo was handled in the port, which led to severe overcrowding. This led the Bahraini government to launch a series of expansions in the next decade, including the opening of the Mina Salman Container Terminal in 1979. The port was also the only port in the Persian Gulf to be completely operated by citizens, rather than foreign workers. Over 75% of the port's cargo is containerised.

On 6 December 2014, the United Kingdom's Defence Secretary Michael Fallon announced that an agreement had been signed with Bahrain to establish a permanent Royal Navy base at Mina Salman, HMS Jufair. The new base would serve to support Royal Navy ships operating in the Persian Gulf, in addition to the Royal Navy mine hunter force already based in Bahrain. Work began on construction in October 2015. On 5 April 2018, the UK Naval Support Facility was officially opened by Bahraini Crown Prince Salman bin Hamad Al Khalifa and Britain's Prince Andrew.

== Facilities ==
The port consists of an 800m finger pier, which comprises 10 berths. Three additional 200m conventional berths are located next to the finger pier and two 300m container berths with a depth of 11m. An Outer arm quay of 285m, alongside a 7m depth draught and storage space consists of 10 sheds plus additional open storage and container storage areas totaling 538,000m sq, are present. The cargo handling area covers an area of 60,000m sq.
