= Yaeyama-class minesweeper =

Self-Defense Force minesweepers

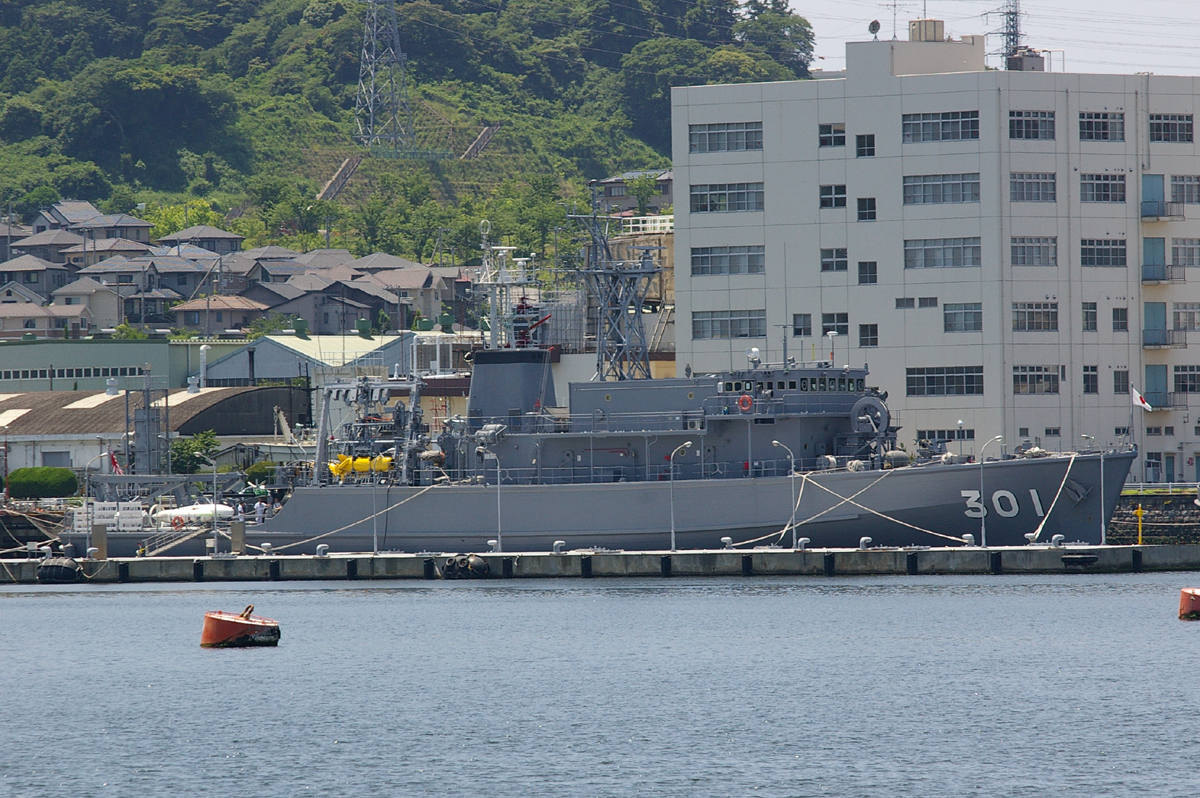
- JDS Yaeyama (MSO-301)

Class overview
- Operators: Japan Maritime Self-Defense Force
- Succeeded by: Awaji-class minesweeper
- Planned: 6
- Completed: 3
- Canceled: 3
- Retired: 3

General characteristics
- Displacement: 1,000 tons standard (Official); 1,250 tons full load (estimated)
- Length: 67 m (220 ft)
- Beam: 11.8 m (38.7 ft)
- Draft: 3.1 m (10.2 ft)
- Depth: 5.2 m (17 ft)
- Propulsion: Diesel, two Mitsubishi 6NMU-TA1 diesels of 2,400 hp (1.76 MW), two shafts; one 350 hp (257 kW) hydrojet bow thruster
- Speed: 14 knots (26 km/h)
- Complement: 60
- Armament: 1 JM-61 Sea Vulcan; Mine-hunting and sweeping equipment

The Yaeyama class is the largest class of Japan Maritime Self-Defense Force minesweepers, designed for open-sea mine clearance operations. Three ships were built in the class; a further three ships were planned but were cancelled. The ships use wooden hulls to reduce their magnetic signature and are some of the largest-sized wooden hull ships designed today.

Jane's Fighting Ships notes their similarity to the U.S. Avenger-class minesweepers.

== Design ==
The forecastle was stretched to more than 3/4 of the total length to suppress the increase of retention and member dimensions of the longitudinal strength.

In order to cope with an increase in shear stress accompanying the enlargement of the ship and thickness increase, the outer plate structure has a three layer double arrow blade structure in which the inner layer plates are inclined at right angles to each other and a vertical laminate of the outer layer is stretched to this It is said. In the case of adopting the same double arrow blade structure as the conventional minesweeping boat, it was thought that the inner layer board thickness became 47 mm, but it is suppressed to 20 mm by this.

The use of various tree species, seen in the list below, is the same as the Uwajima-class minesweepers.

- Douglas fir - keel skeg, bottom stringer, chine material, frame, the outer plate-deck
- Keyaki - Kiel friction material
- Oleaceae - plywood

The main engine is equipped with Mitsubishi Heavy Industries 4-cycle non-magnetic diesel engines of the same design as in the Uwajimas but with a larger output (1,200 hp / 1,000 Rpm) mounted via a double anti-vibration device. It is the first minesweeper in the Japanese navy to feature a bow thruster, GPS equipped with a precision navigation equipment and automatic Sokan apparatus in order to improve the ship's ability to hold position.

== Ships in the class ==
Pennant no.	Name	Laid down	Launched	Shipyard	Commissioned	Decommissioned	Home port	Unit
MSO-301	Yaeyama	30 August 1990	29 August 1991	Hitachi, Kanagawa	16 March 1993	28 June 2016	Yokosuka	Minesweeper Division 51
MSO-302	Tsushima	20 July 1990	20 September 1991	Nikko, Tsurumi	23 March 1993	1 July 2016	Yokosuka	Minesweeper Division 51
MSO-303	Hachijō	17 May 1991	15 December 1992	Nikko, Tsurumi	24 March 1994	6 June 2017	Yokosuka	Minesweeper Division 51

== Comparable ships ==
- Avenger class minesweepers
- List of minesweepers of the Royal Netherlands Navy
