= OPS-18 =

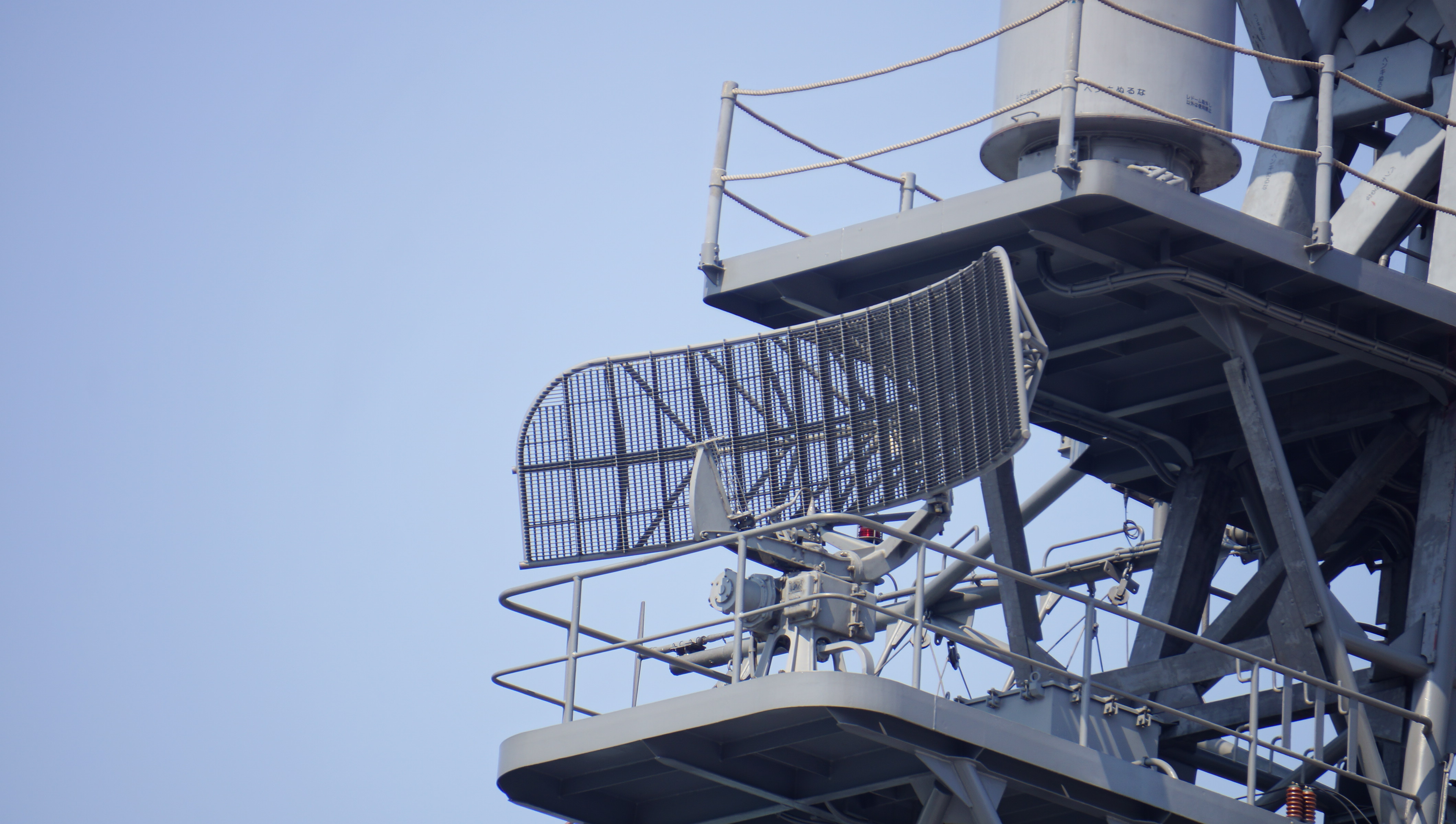
- OPS-18 aboard JS Kashima
- Country of origin: Japan
- Manufacturer: Japan Radio Company
- Introduced: 1976
- Type: 2D
- Frequency: C band
- Azimuth: Unlimited
- Power: 150 ~ 200 kW

OPS-18 is a two-dimensional radar manufactured by Japan Radio Company. It is installed as an anti-water search radar on the Maritime Self-Defense Force's escort ship. Variations include OPS-18-1 and OPS-18-3.

The model numbers of the Maritime Self-Defense Force's electronic devices, including this machine, are generally based on the naming rules for military electronic devices of the U.S. military. It is for radar mounted on surface vessels, for detection / distance direction measurement / search.

== OPS-3 / OPS-5 ==
The National Safety Agency's Coastal Security Force obtained the AN/SPS-5B radar as equipment for the Bluebird-class minesweeper (Yashima-class minesweeper) provided by the United States in the 1958 plan.

In Japan, the OPS-3 was developed based on this AN/SPS-5, and started to be installed on the JDS Akebono, the first domestic guard ship for the National Safety Agency guards, and the Ikazuchi-class destroyer escort. The subsequently developed OPS-5 was installed on the first Akizuki-class destroyer.

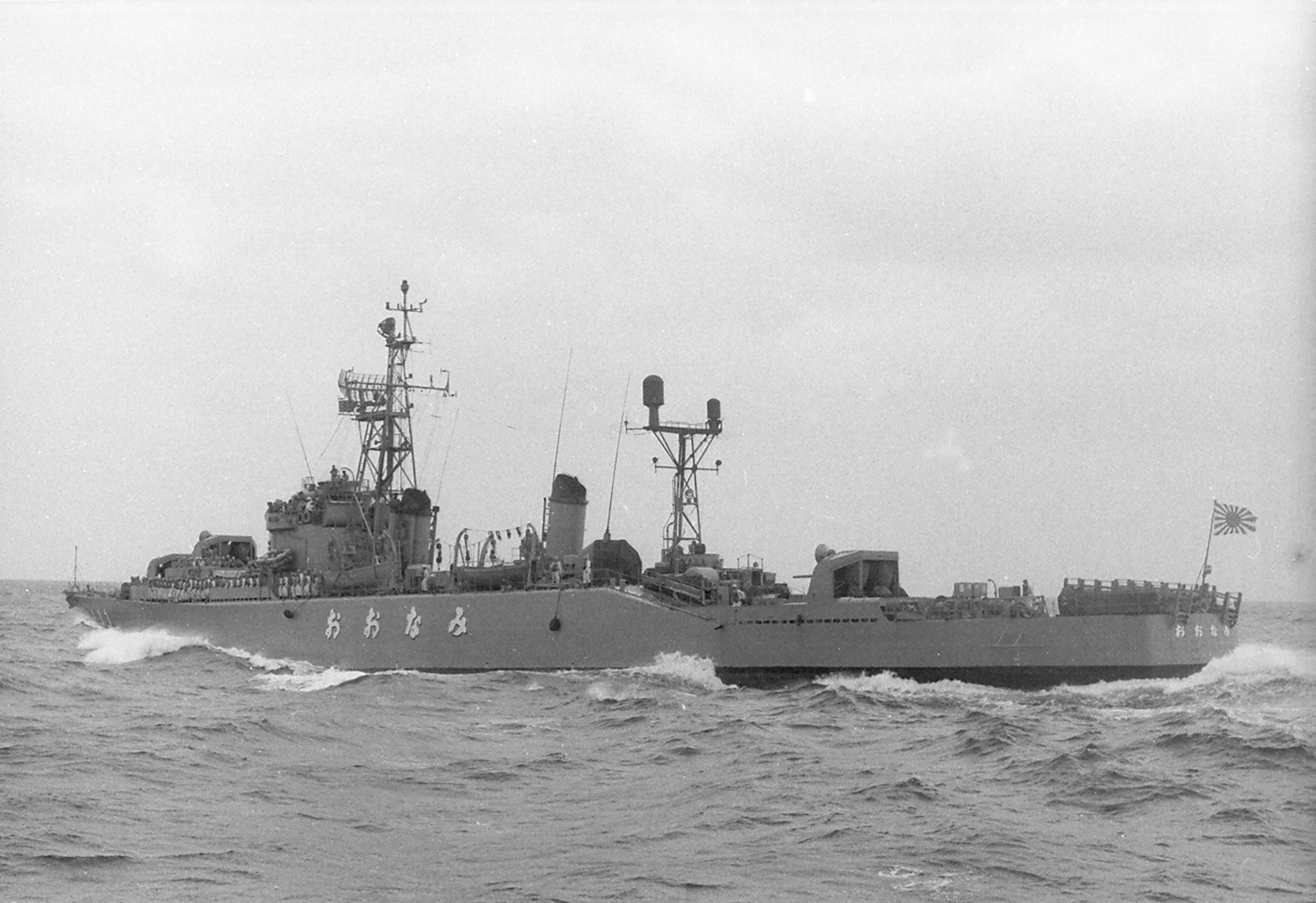
OPS-5 aboard JDS Ōnami

=== On board ships ===
==== OPS-3 ====
- JDS Akebono
- Ikazuchi-class destroyer
- Murasame-class destroyer

==== OPS-5 ====
- Ayanami-class destroyer
- Akizuki-class destroyer

== OPS-16 / OPS-17 ==
In the 1960s, the OPS-16 radar was developed as the second generation based on the OPS-3 and OPS-5. These used slightly higher frequencies and had enhanced ECCM properties.

It has undergone a minor upgrade which allowed it to switch between true and relative orientations, and has video output and trigger output terminals. In addition, the OPS-16D type has been made into a semiconductor element based on the OPS-16C type, and the pulse width and pulse repetition frequency have been changed to improve performance. In addition, the major version upgrade version of OPS-17 has two intermediate frequency bandwidths and two video bandwidths.

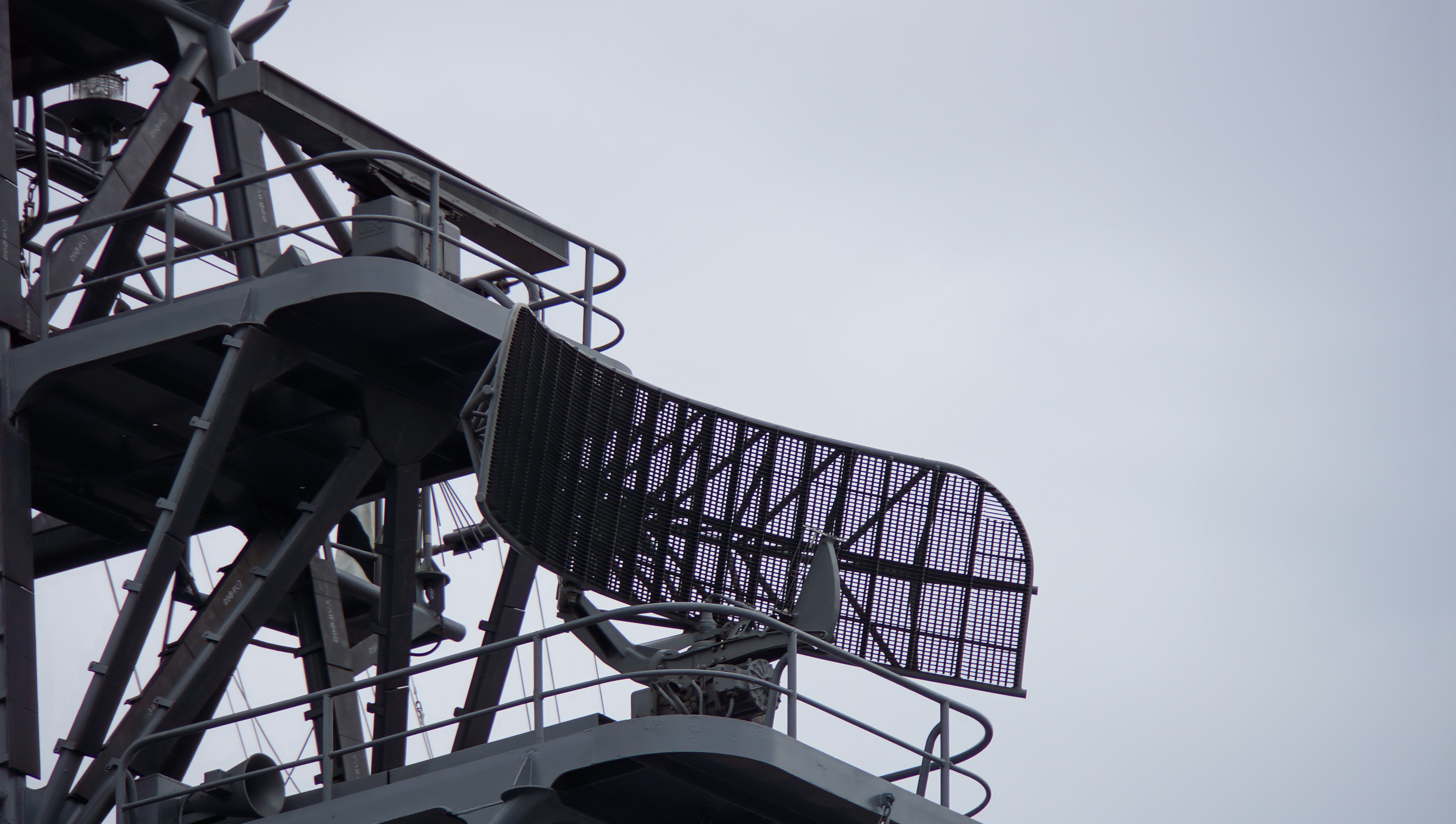
OPS-16 aboard JS Harima

=== On board ships ===
==== OPS-16 ====
- Umitaka-class submarine chaser
- Mizutori-submarine chaser
- Isuzu-class destroyer escort
- Tachikaze-class destroyer
- JS Chiyoda
- Hibiki-class ocean surveillance ship
- JDS Azuma
- Fuji

==== OPS-17 ====
- Yamagumo-class destroyer
- Takatsuki-class destroyer
- Minegumo-class destroyer
- Chikugo-class destroyer escort
- Haruna-class destroyer
- JDS Hayase
- JDS Sōya

== OPS-18 ==
The OPS-18 was developed from the 1970s to the 1980s by introducing the frequency agility method. The OPS-18 has two built-in transmitters, a wideband automatic tuning function and an automatic collision prevention assistance (ARPA) function, and can display up to 10 targets at the same time.

On the other hand, while removing the ARPA function in OPS-18-1, it has a target indication function with improved minimum sensitivity, and it plays a role as a low-altitude warning radar in the Hatsuyuki-class destroyer. In addition, in OPS-18-3, a parabolic cylinder type antenna is used instead of the parabolic torus type antenna conventionally used in this series.

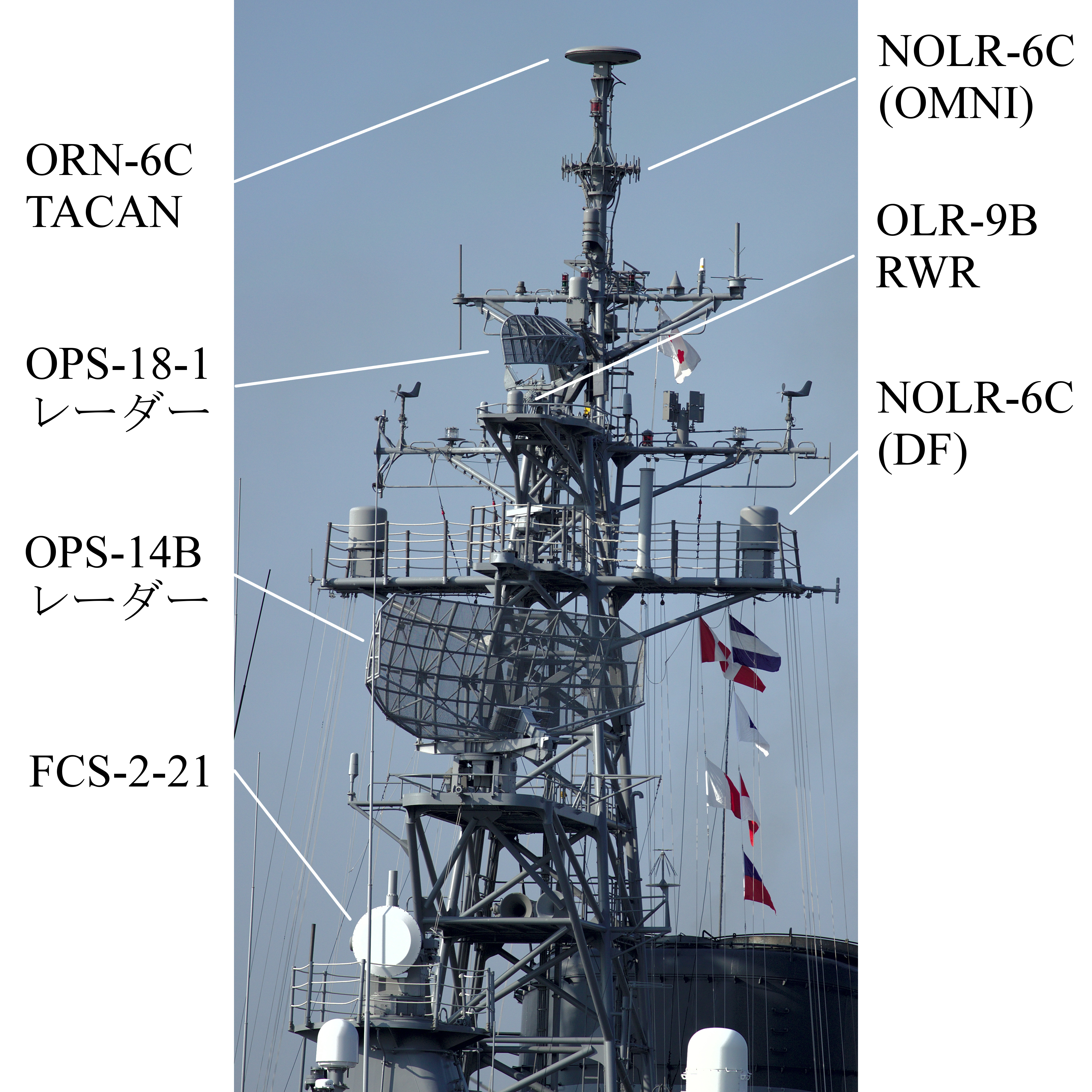
OPS-18-1 aboard JS Isoyuki

=== On board ships ===
- Hatsuyuki-class destroyer
- PG-821-class patrol boats
- Hayabusa-class patrol boat
- Miura-class tank landing ship
- Uraga-class mine countermeasure vessel
- Towada-class replenishment ship
- Futami-class hydrographic survey ship
- JS Kurobe
- JS Tenryū
- Hibiki-class ocean surveillance Ship
- JS Kashima
- JS Asuka

== Gallery ==
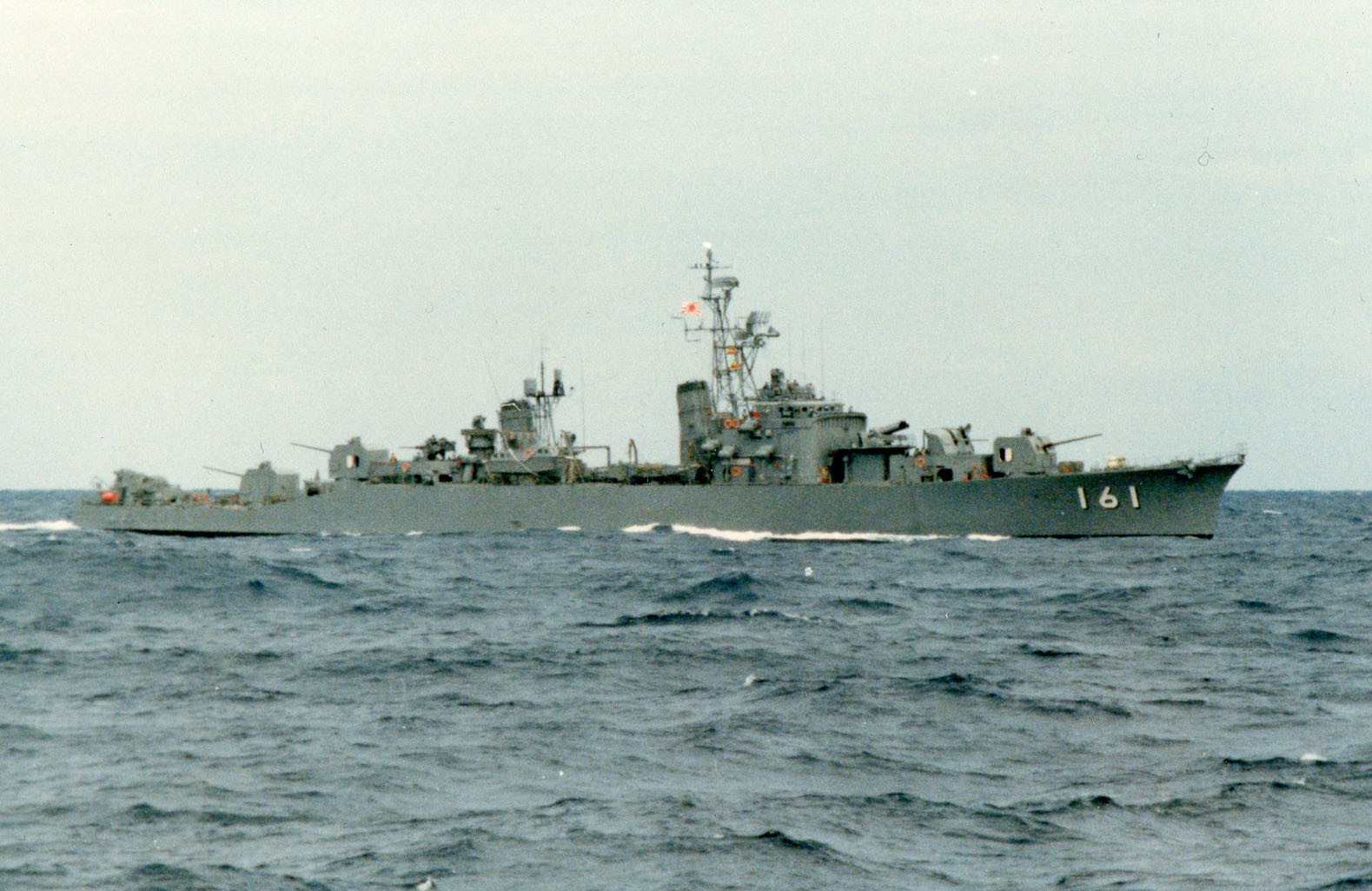
OPS-5 aboard JDS Akizuki

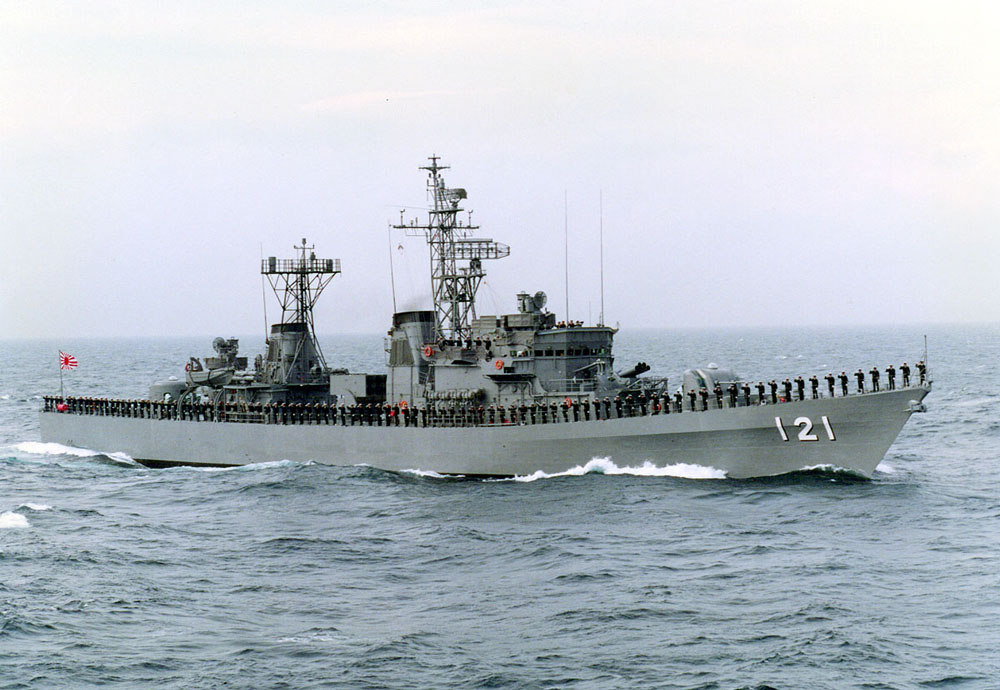
OPS-17 aboard JDS Yūgumo

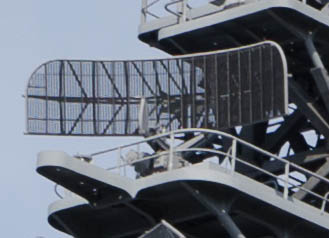
OPS-18 aboard JS Asuka

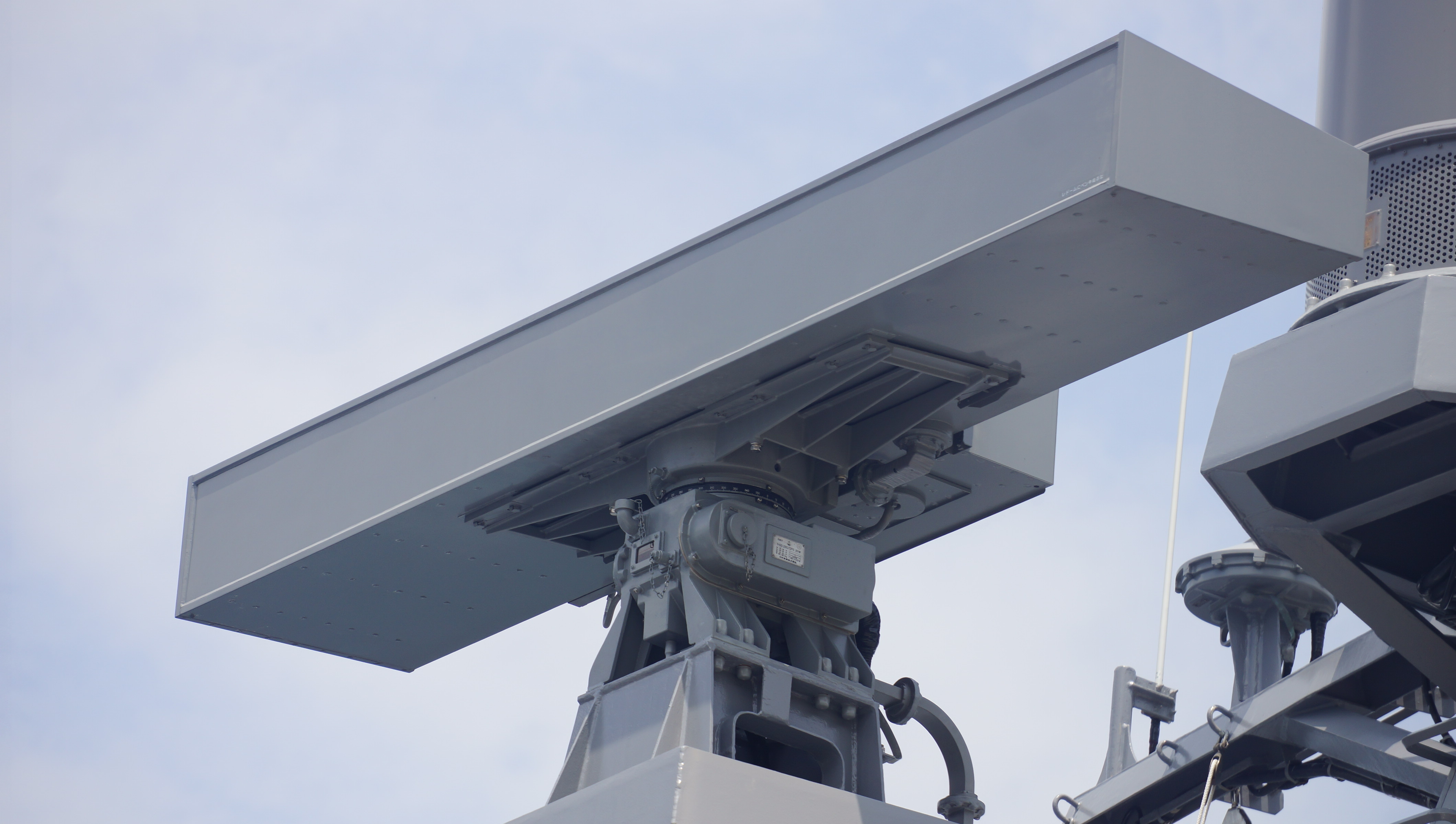
OPS-18-3 aboard JS Hayabusa
