= OPS-14 =

Two-dimensional radar

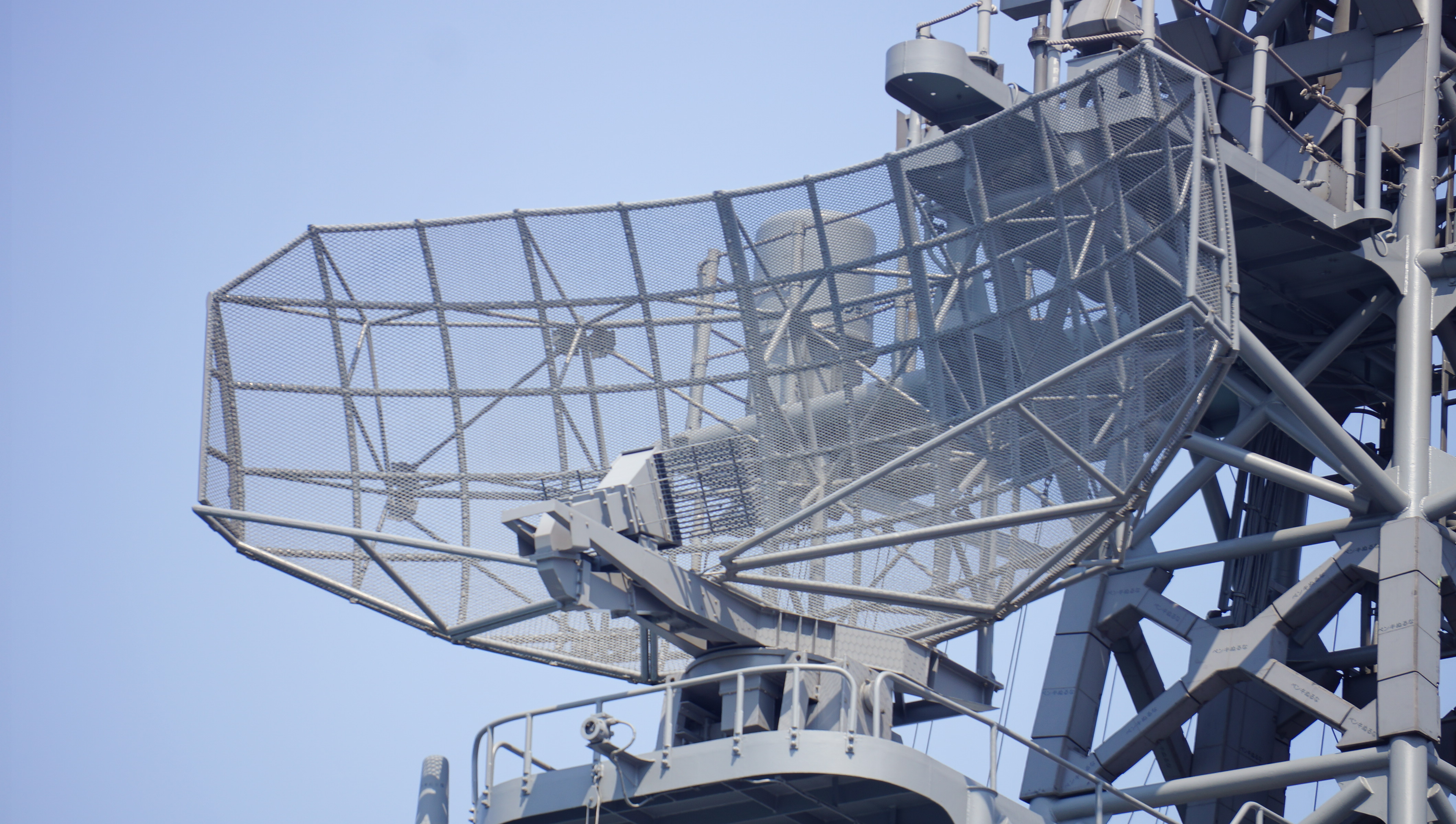
- OPS-14B aboard JS Setoyuki
- Country of origin: Japan
- Manufacturer: Mitsubishi Electric
- Introduced: 1971
- Type: 2D
- Frequency: L band
- Range: 200 km (110 nmi)
- Power: 400 kW

OPS-14 is a two-dimensional radar manufactured by Mitsubishi Electric. It is mainly mounted on the Maritime Self-Defense Force's self-defense ship as an anti-aircraft search radar. Variations include OPS-14B and OPS-14C.

The model numbers of the Maritime Self-Defense Force's electronic devices, including this machine, are generally based on the naming rules for military electronic devices of the U.S. military. It is for radar mounted on surface vessels, for detection / distance direction measurement / search.

== Overview ==
In the early 1950s, Japan obtained AN/SPS-6 from the United States based on the Military Aid Plan (MAP) for mounting on the Harukaze-class destroyer, and developed the domestically produced OPS-1 based on this. It was installed on the first Akizuki-class destroyer. In addition, the Ayanami-class destroyer was equipped with AN/SPS-12, which was an improved version of AN/SPS-6, and this technology was backfitted to OPS-1. Later, the OPS-2, which had the same transmitter and receiver and a smaller antenna, was also developed for installation on the Isuzu-class destroyer. The maximum detection distance when targeting PV-2 was 50 nmi (93 km) for OPS-2. This machine was developed through the OPS-1 and OPS-2 family.

This unit was an all-transistor antenna, and uses a typical cosecant squared characteristic molded beam antenna as an antenna. A frequency agility method was also introduced to improve ECCM. Installation started in 1967 and the first example of its adoption was the Chikugo-class destroyer. From 1973, it has been switched to the OPS-14B, which has enhanced clutter suppression performance by introducing movement target detection (MTI) technology. In addition, the magnetron was used as the oscillator in the past, but in the OPS-14C, it was changed to the klystron with the introduction of pulse compression technology, and the ECCM capability was strengthened.

Following the Hatsuyuki-class destroyer was also introduced with the OPS-14B, and its advanced Asagiri-class destroyer was equipped with the OPS-14C. This was introduced because the aircraft has performance that matches the Sea Sparrow IBPDMS equipped with 52DD, and also to clarify the radar search range with the helicopter destroyers and the guided-missile destroyers. Both performance and reliability were satisfactory. However, compared to the OPS-11 installed on the conventional destroyers, the maximum detection distance was only about half, and there was doubt about the reliability of the anti-aircraft warning ability when acting alone. For this reason, the destroyers after 1985 was updated to the new 3D radar OPS-24. However, since then, it has been installed on destroyer escorts and other auxiliary ships. Also, the Japan Coast Guard built a two-helicopter patrol boat Shikishima for escorting plutonium carriers with a budget of 1990, but this ship was also used to guard against terrorist attacks using helicopters.

== On board ships ==
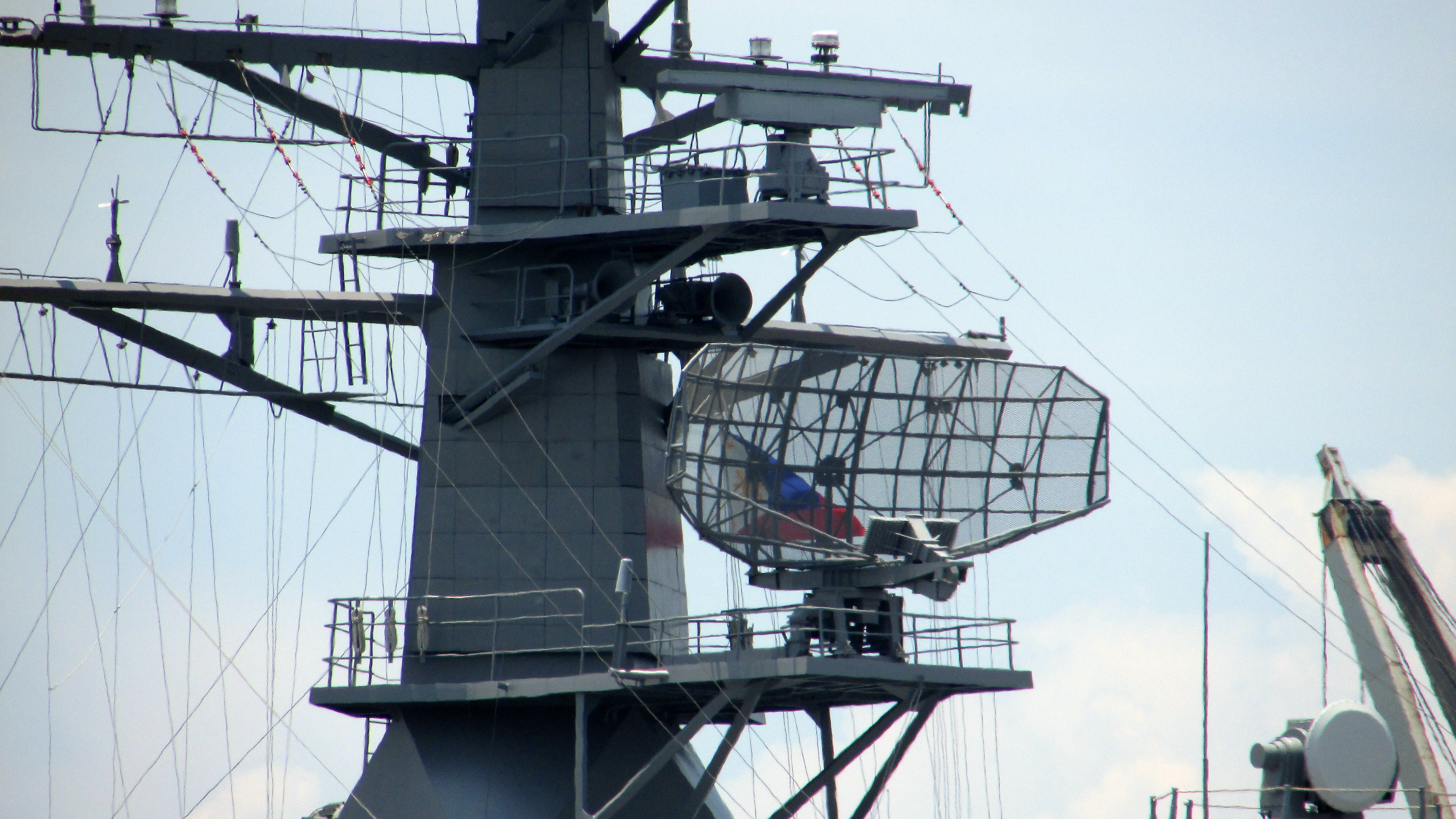
OPS-14 aboard JS Bungo

=== Destroyers ===
- Chikugo-class
- Hatsuyuki-class
- Asagiri-class
- Abukuma-class

=== Minelayers ===
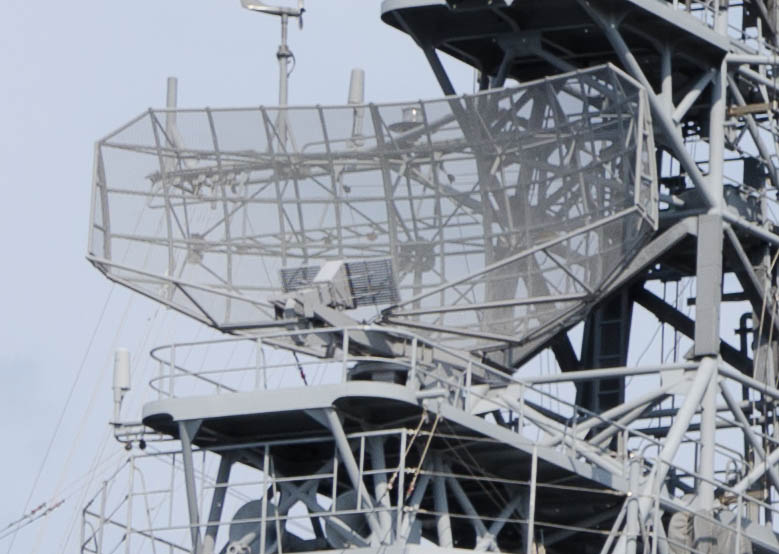
- OPS-14 aboard JS Asuka
  JDS Sōya
- JDS Hayase
- Uraga-class

=== Landing ships ===
- Miura-class
- Ōsumi-class

=== Auxiliaries ===
- JS Kurobe
- JS Tenryu
- JS Kashima
- JS Asuka
- Shikishima

== Gallery ==
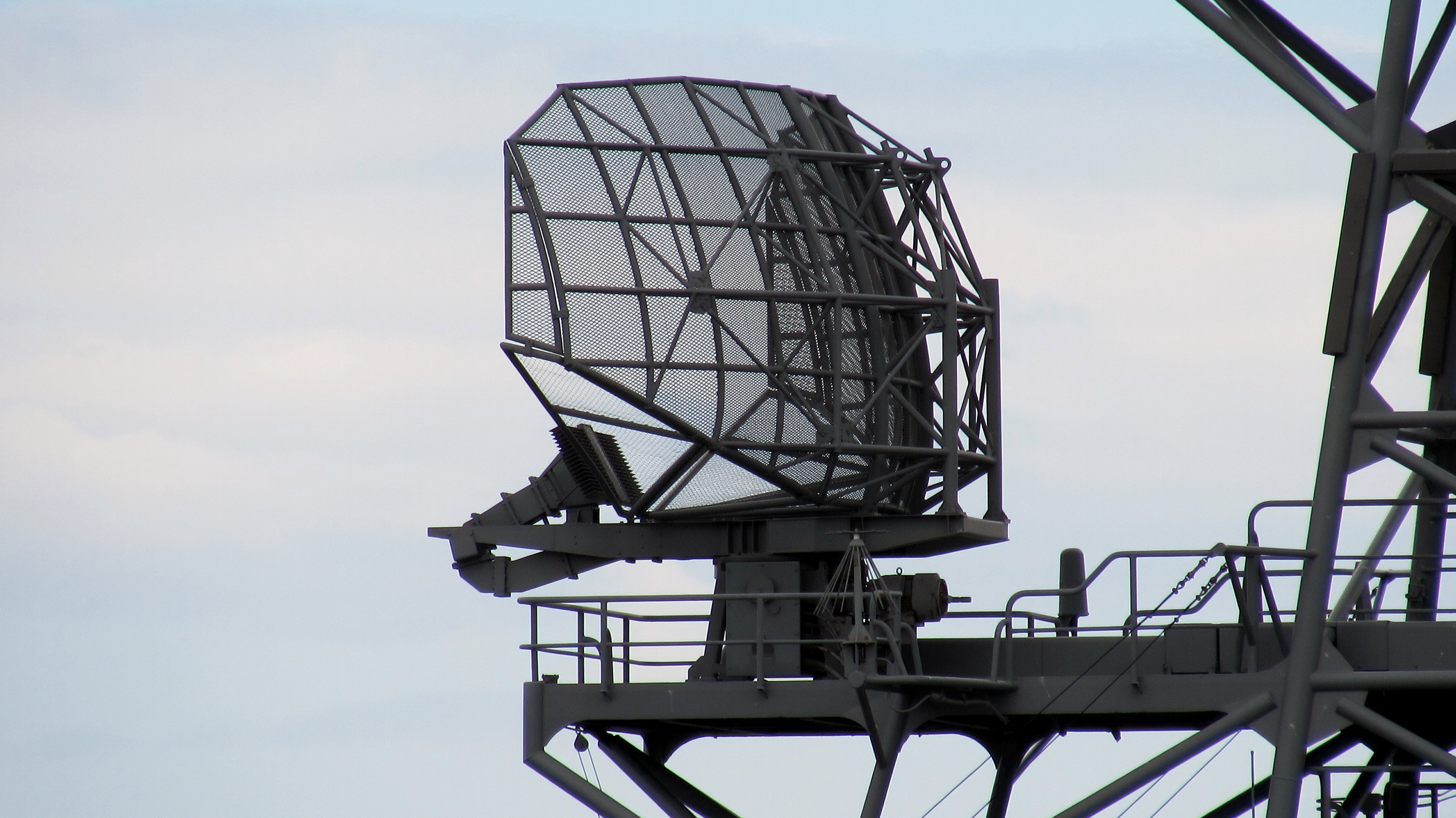
OPS-14 aboard JS Amagiri

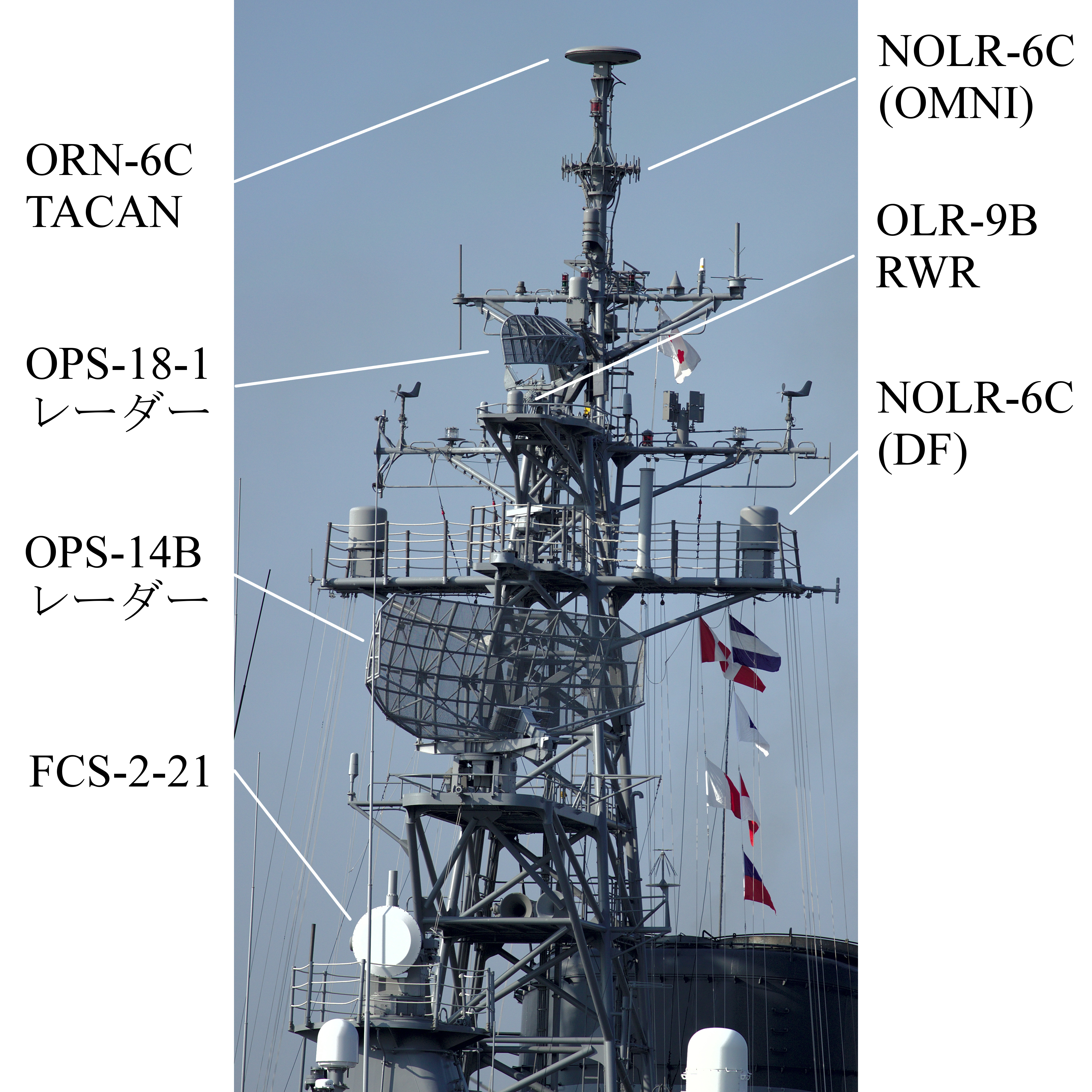
OPS-14B aboard JS Isoyuki

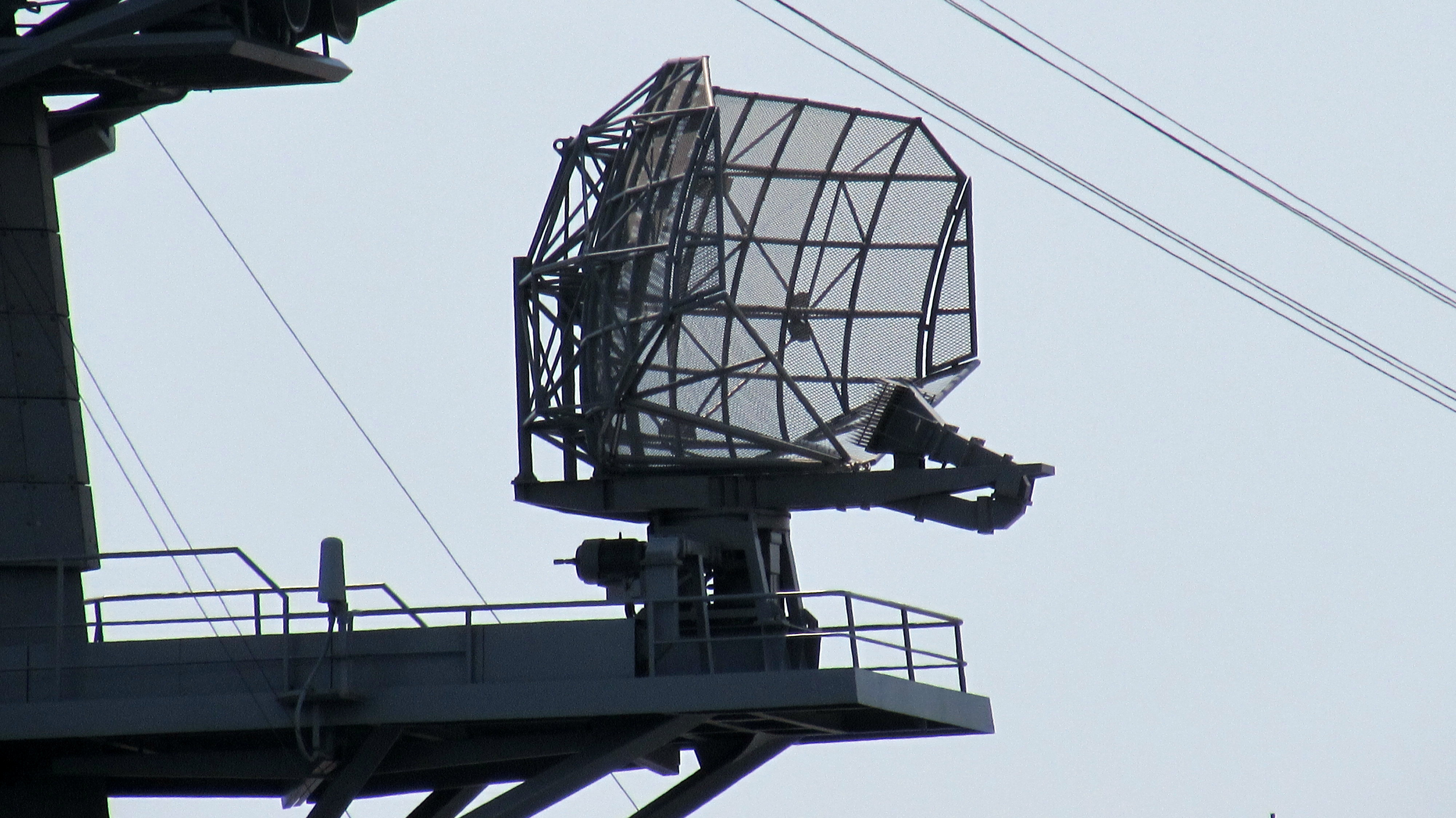
OPS-14C aboard JS Ōsumi

OPS-14C aboard JS Uraga
