= Erimo =

Erimo may refer to:

- Cape Erimo, headland in Hokkaido
- Erimo, Hokkaido, town in Hokkaido
- JDS Erimo, a former minelayer of the JMSDF commissioned in 1955
