= JS Isoyuki =

Hatsuyuki-class destroyer

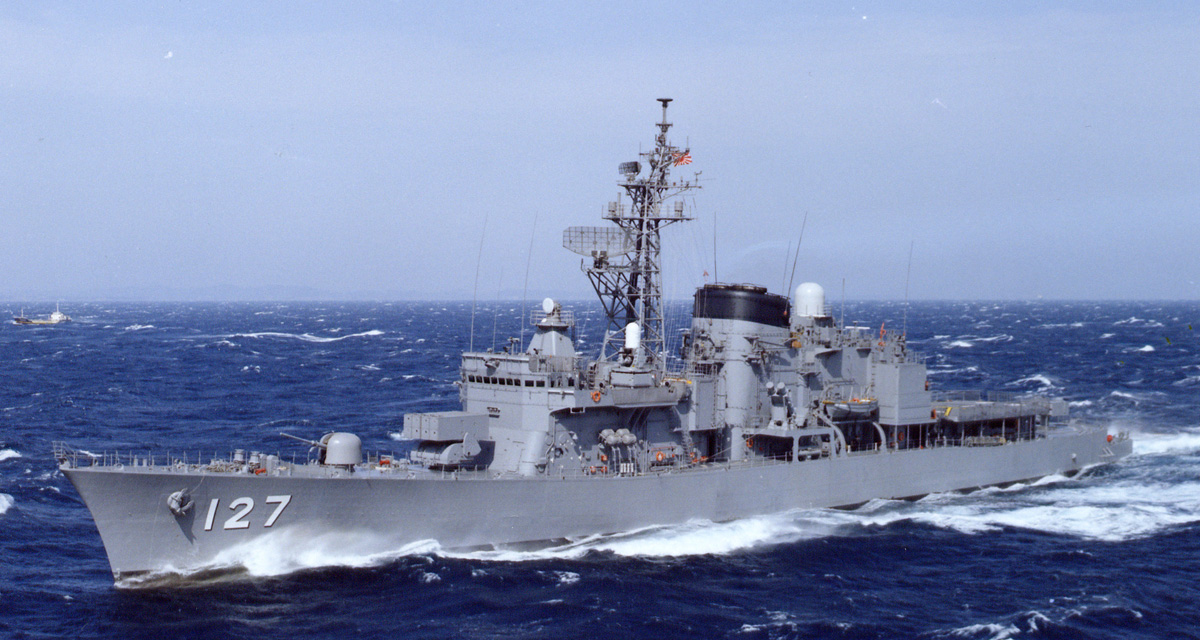
- JS Isoyuki

History

Japan
- Name: Isoyuki; (いそゆき)
- Ordered: 1980
- Builder: IHI, Tokyo
- Laid down: 20 April 1982
- Launched: 19 September 1983
- Commissioned: 23 January 1985
- Decommissioned: 13 March 2014
- Stricken: November 2015
- Home port: Sasebo
- Identification: Pennant number: DD-127
- Fate: Scrapped

General characteristics
- Class & type: Hatsuyuki-class destroyer
- Displacement: 2,950 tons standard, 4,000 tons hull load
- Length: 130 m (430 ft)
- Beam: 13.6 m (44 ft 7 in)
- Draft: 4.2 m (13 ft 9 in); 4.4 m (14 ft 5 in) (DD 129 to DD 132)
- Propulsion: 2 × KHI-RR TM3B gas turbines, 45,000 shp (34 MW); 2 × KHI-RR RM1C gas turbines, 9,900 shp (7.4 MW); 2 shafts, cp props
- Speed: 30 knots (35 mph; 56 km/h)
- Complement: 200
- Sensors & processing systems: OYQ-5 tactical data system; FCS-2 fire-control system; OPS-14 air search radar; OPS-18 surface search radar; OQS-4 hull sonar; OQR-1 TASS (in some ships)
- Electronic warfare & decoys: NOLR-6C intercept; OLT-3 jammer; Mark 36 SRBOC; Towed torpedo decoys
- Armament: 1 × OTO Melara 76 mm gun; 2 × 20 mm Phalanx CIWS; 2 × Harpoon SSM quad canisters; 1 × Sea Sparrow SAM octuple launcher; 1 × ASROC octuple launcher; 2 × triple 324 mm torpedo tubes
- Aircraft carried: 1 × HSS-2B or SH-60J helicopter
- Aviation facilities: Hangar and helipad

JS Isoyuki (DD-127) was a Hatsuyuki-class destroyer of the Japanese Maritime Self-Defense Force.

== Development and design ==
Adopting Japan's first all-gas turbine engine (COGOG), equipped with well-balanced weapons such as helicopters, C4I systems, and various missiles, it is inferior to Western frigate at that time. It has been evaluated as a non-escort ship. Twelve ships were built as first-generation general-purpose escort vessels in the era of eight ships and eight aircraft, they supported the escort fleet for a long time, but now they are gradually retiring due to aging.

In addition, there are many changes to training ships, and up to three ships have been operated in the training fleet as Shimayuki-class training ships, but the decline has begun with the conversion of Hatakaze-class destroyers to training ships.

The core of the combat system is the OYQ-5 Tactical Data Processing System (TDPS), composed of one AN/UYK-20 computer and five OJ-194B workstations and capable of receiving data automatically from other ships via Link-14 (STANAG 5514).

This is the first destroyer class in the JMSDF equipped with the Sea Sparrow Improved basic point defense missile system. The IBPDMS of this class uses FCS-2 fire-control systems of Japanese make and one octuple launcher at the afterdeck. And in the JMSDF, OTO Melara 76 mm compact gun and Boeing Harpoon surface-to-surface missile are adopted from the ship of FY1977 including this class. Also, ships built in FY1979 and beyond carried Phalanx CIWS and were retrofitted to previous ships.

== Construction and career ==
She was laid down on 20 April 1982 and launched on 19 September 1983 at IHI Corporation in Tokyo. She commissioned on 23 January 1985.

In 1986, she participated in Exercise RIMPAC 1986.

In 1990, she participated in Exercise RIMPAC 1990.

On March 13, 2014, she was removed from the register due to the commissioning of JS Suzutsuki. The final affiliation was the 13th escort fleet of the escort fleet, and the homeport was Sasebo. After that, on July 23, the same year, it was circulated to the JMU Maizuru Works, remodeled the ship, and painted white, which seems to be for aiming and measurement.

In November 2015, she was sold for scrap and departed from Maizuru to be dismantled.

== Gallery ==
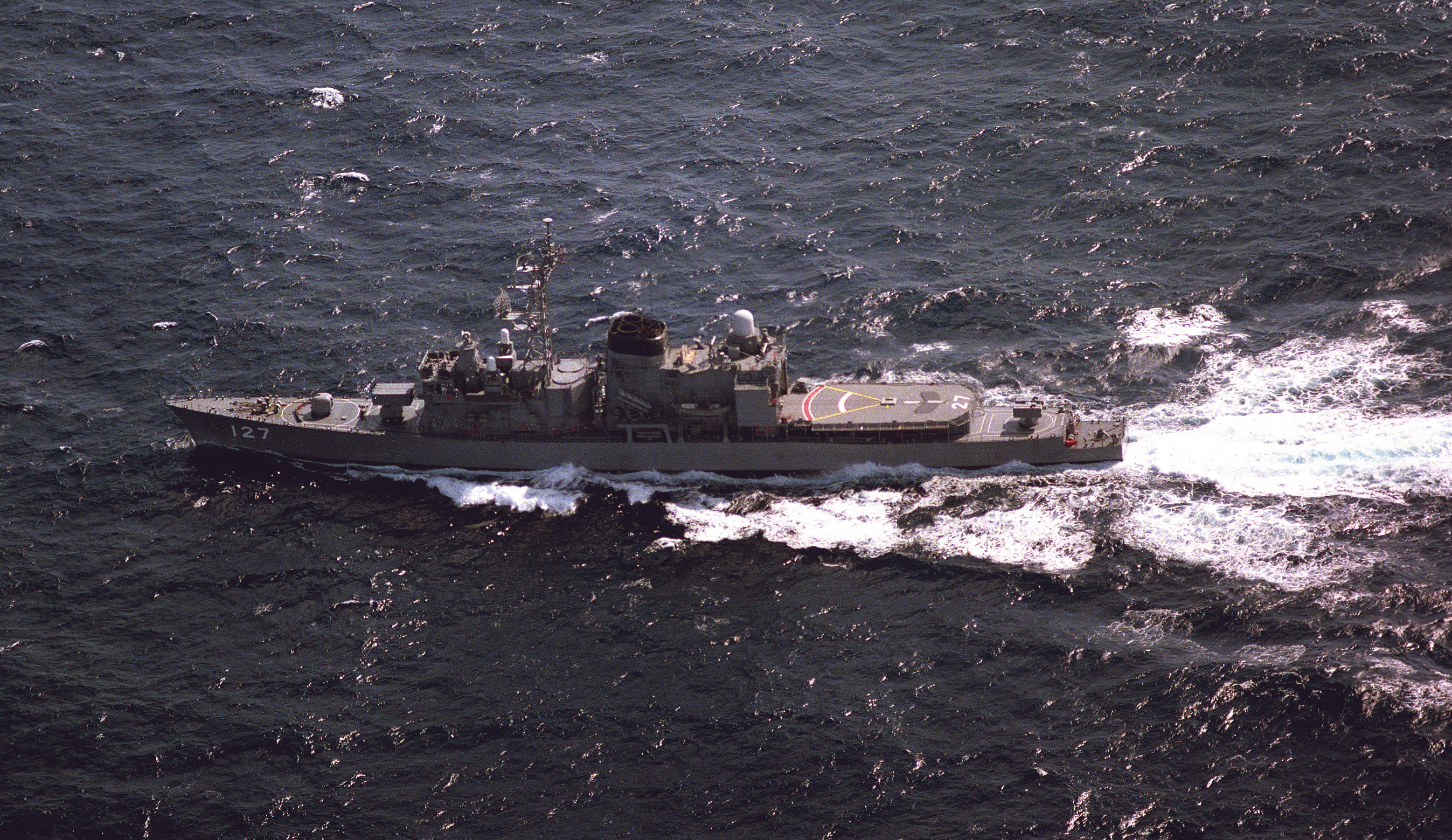
JS Isoyuki underway on 10 October 1988.

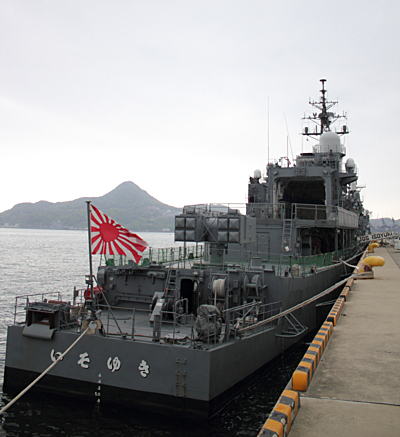
JS Isoyuki at Sasebo on 30 April 2011.

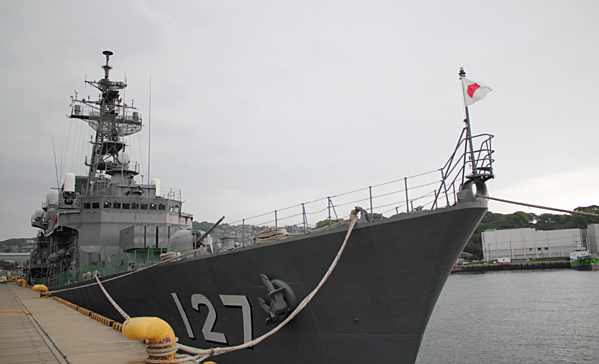
JS Isoyuki at Sasebo on 30 April 2011.

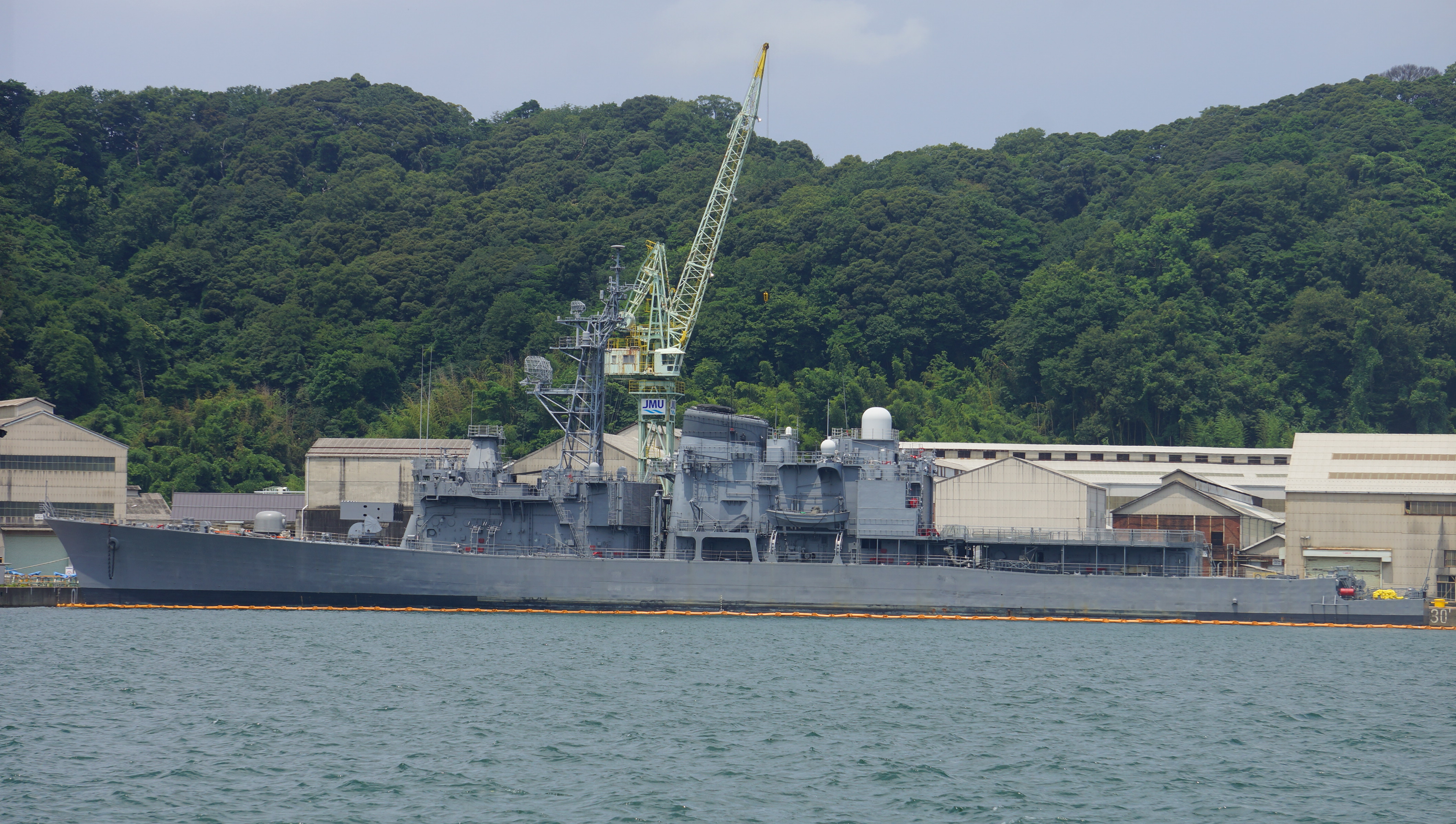
JS Isoyuki at JMU Maizuru Shipyard on 27 July 2014.

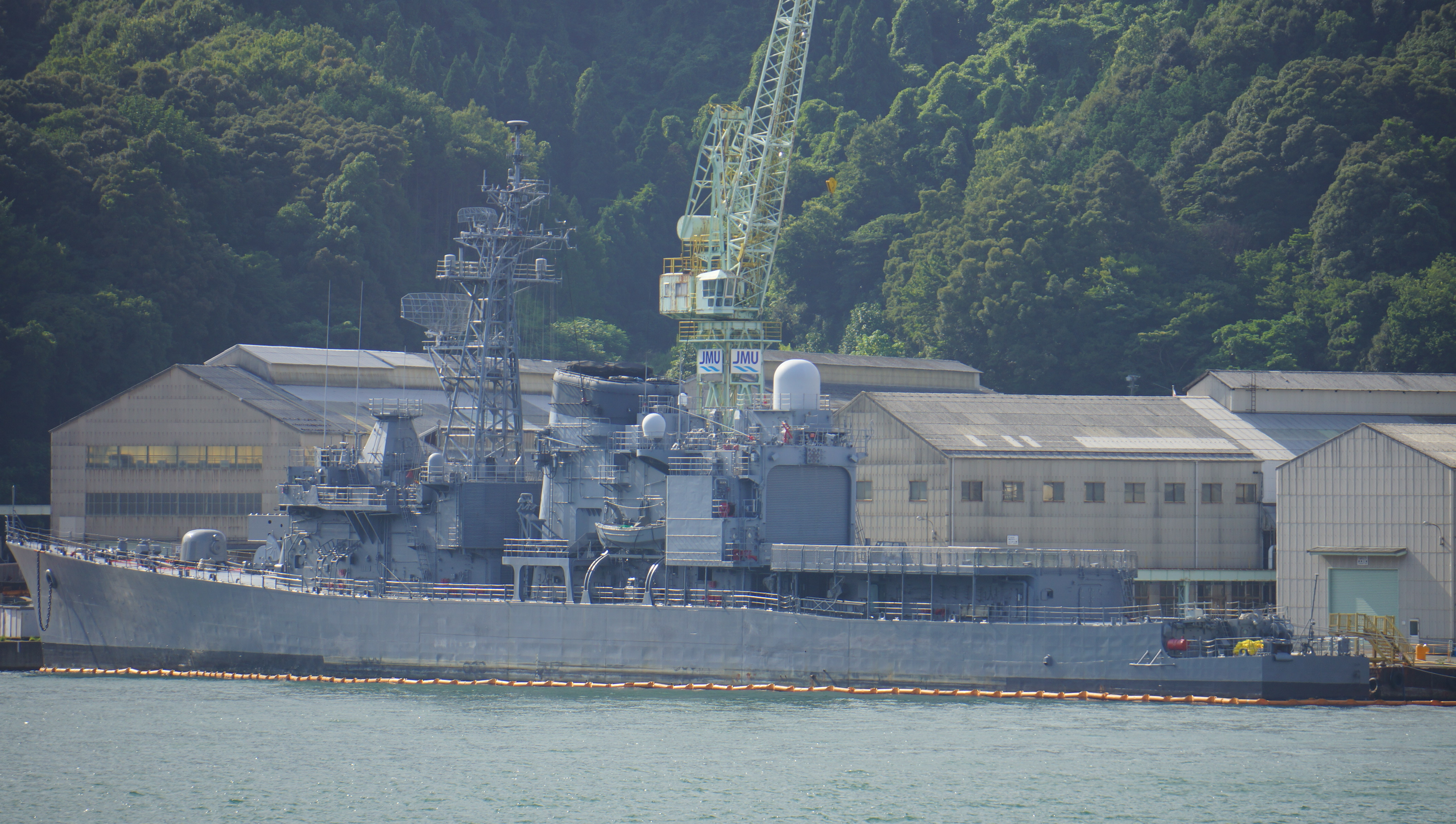
JS Isoyuki at JMU Maizuru Shipyard on 27 July 2014.

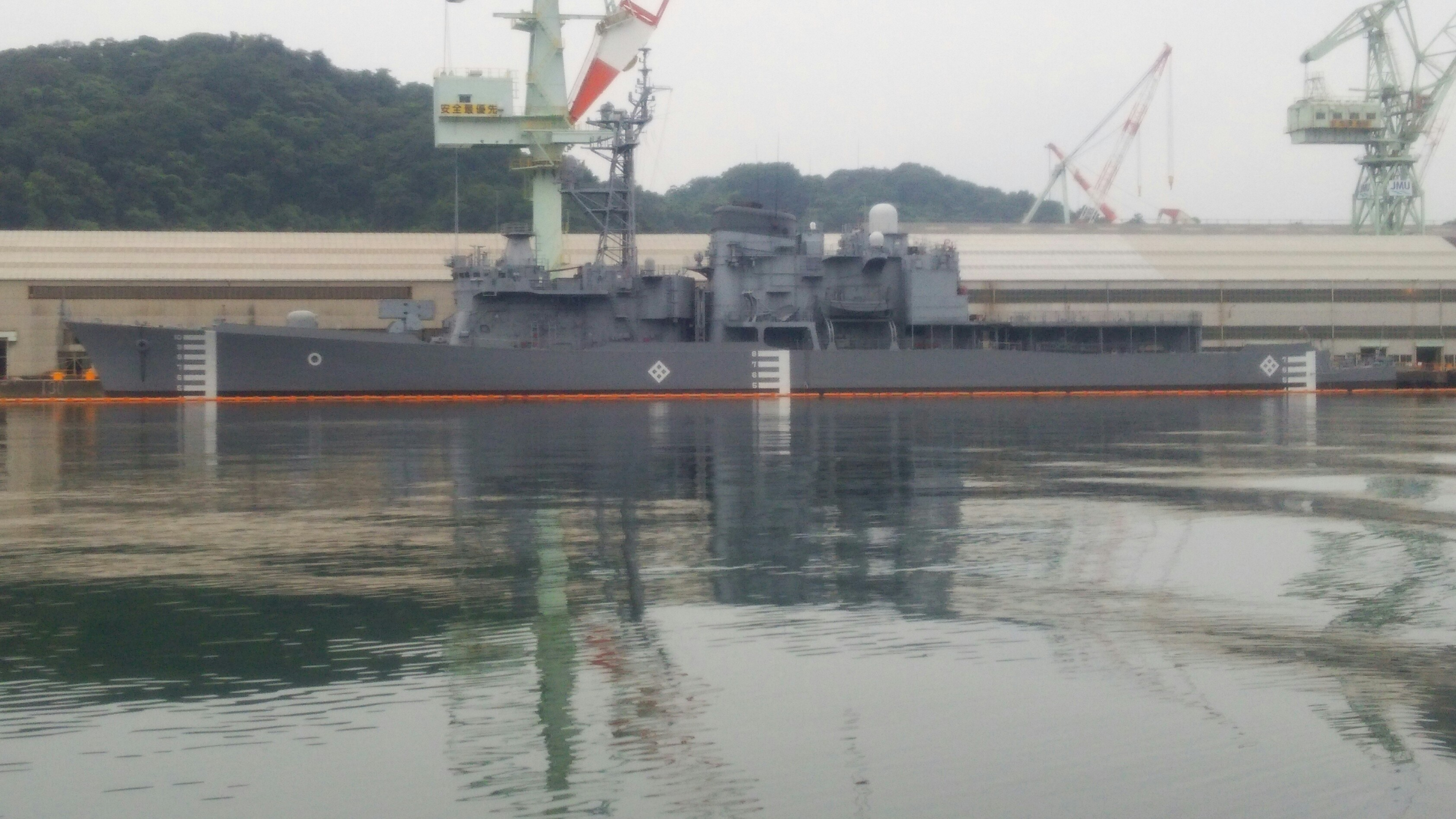
JS Isoyuki docked on 4 July 2015.
