= JS Kurihama =

Japanese experimental ship

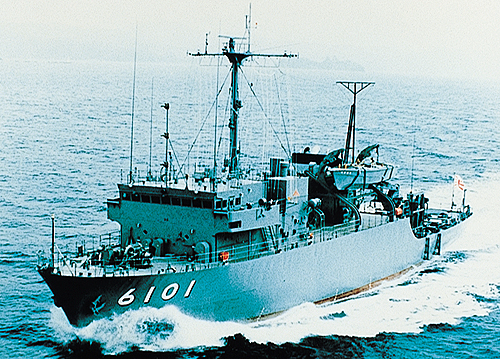
- JS Kurihama

History

Japan
- Name: Kurihama; (くりはま)
- Namesake: Kurihama
- Ordered: 1978
- Builder: Sasebo Naval Arsenal, Sasebo
- Laid down: 23 March 1979
- Launched: 20 September 1979
- Commissioned: 8 April 1980
- Decommissioned: 6 April 2012
- Home port: Yokosuka
- Identification: Pennant number: ASE-6101
- Status: Decommissioned

Class overview
- Preceded by: N/A
- Succeeded by: Asuka class

General characteristics
- Type: Experimental ship
- Displacement: 950–1,100 long tons (965–1,118 t) full load
- Length: 68.0 m (223 ft 1 in)
- Beam: 11.6 m (38 ft 1 in)
- Draft: 3.3 m (10 ft 10 in)
- Depth: 5.0 m (16 ft 5 in)
- Propulsion: Institution COGLAG method; 2 × Fuji diesel 6S30B diesel engines (2,600 hp, 1,900 kW); 2 x shafts
- Speed: 15 knots (28 km/h; 17 mph)
- Complement: 40
- Sensors & processing systems: OPS-9B

JS Kurihama (ASE-6101) was an experimental ship of the Japan Maritime Self-Defense Force.

== Development and design ==
From the above circumstances, special consideration has been given to the torpedo test. The hull is also a long poop deck, and the rear deck is one step lower, making it easier to lift and lower trial torpedoes.

On the starboard side of the rear work deck, a deck crane with a capacity of 5 tons is installed for the installation and operation of test equipment. In addition, a measurement room was set up in the adjacent section of the rear deck, and consideration was given to making it easier to monitor the measurement equipment. In addition, an ultrasonic measuring device and a torpedo launcher device were installed on the port side, and measuring equipment could be loaded and unloaded according to the content of the test. However, unlike the successor JS Asuka, the number of people involved in the test was limited to more than a dozen, so there were many day-trip tests. As for the onboard boats, an 11-metre (36 ft) work boat was mounted on the port side and a 7-metre (23 ft) work boat was mounted on the starboard side.

== Construction and career ==
Kurihama was laid down on 23 March 1979 at Sasebo Naval Arsenal, Sasebo and launched on 20 September 1979. The vessel was commissioned on 8 April 1980.

In August 1997, data was collected using the former escort ship JDS Nagatsuki that was sunk as a target for the actual ship.

On 22 March 2002, the Development Guidance Team was reorganized into the Development Team.

In response to the Great East Japan Earthquake caused by the 2011 off the Pacific coast of Tohoku Earthquake that occurred on 11 March 2011, 46 minutes after the earthquake, an emergency departure was made for disaster dispatch.

On 6 April 2012, a self-defense ship flag return ceremony was held at Yokosuka Base and she was retired. In the history of the ship for about 32 years, the total voyage was 305,186 miles (565,204.5 km) for about 14.1 laps of the earth, and the total voyage time was 39,850 hours.

== Gallery ==
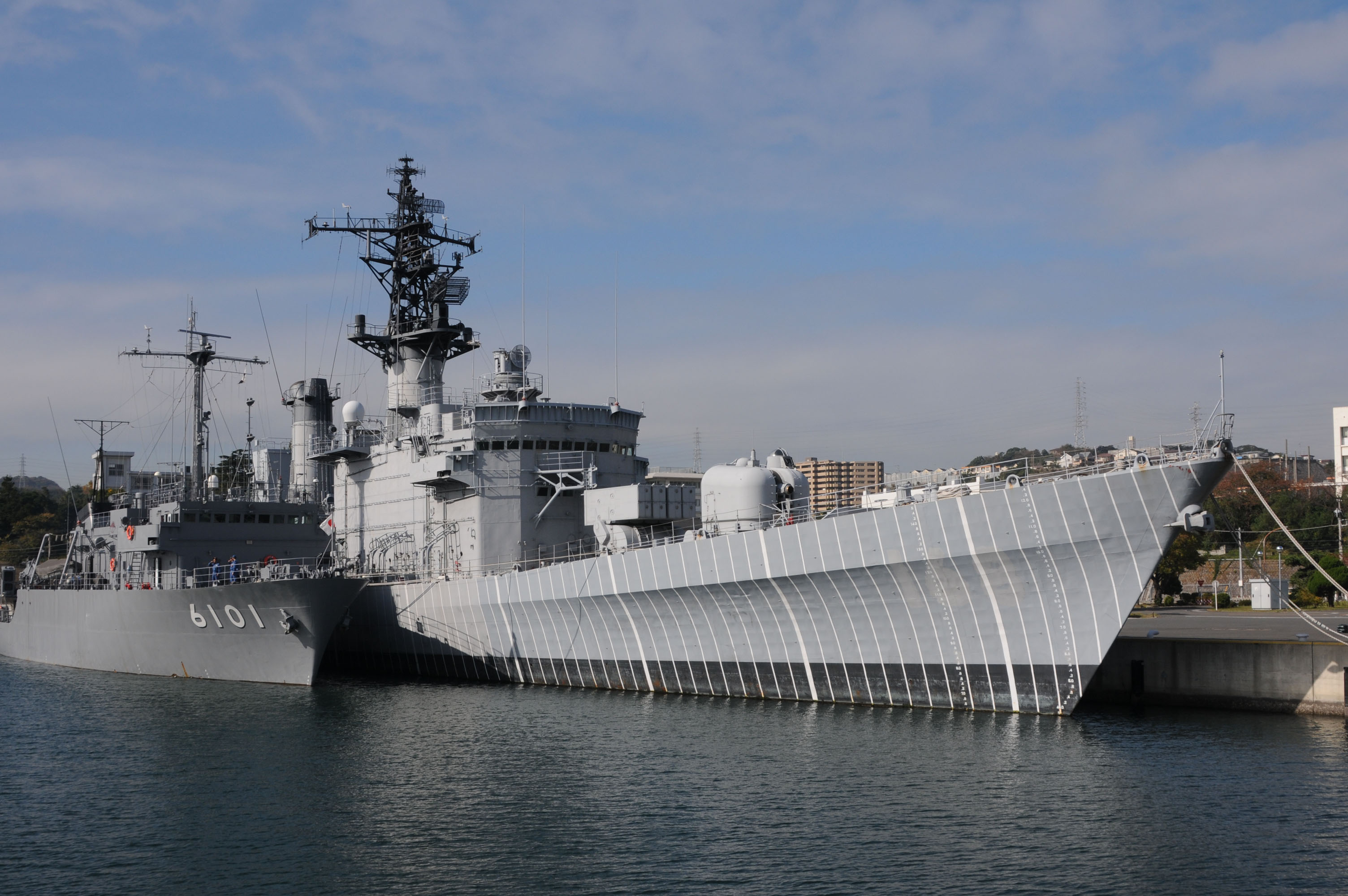
JS Kurihama alongside ex-JDS Tachikaze at Yokosuka on 14 November 2008.

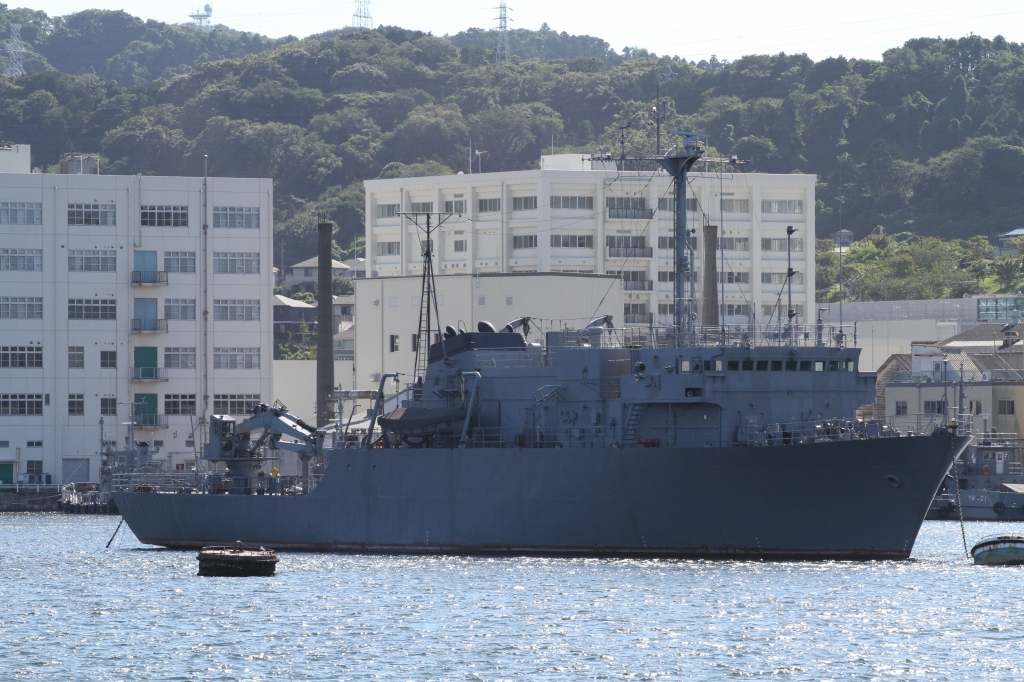
Ex-JS Kurihama at Yokosuka on 30 July 2012.
