= JS Asuka =

Japanese experimental ship

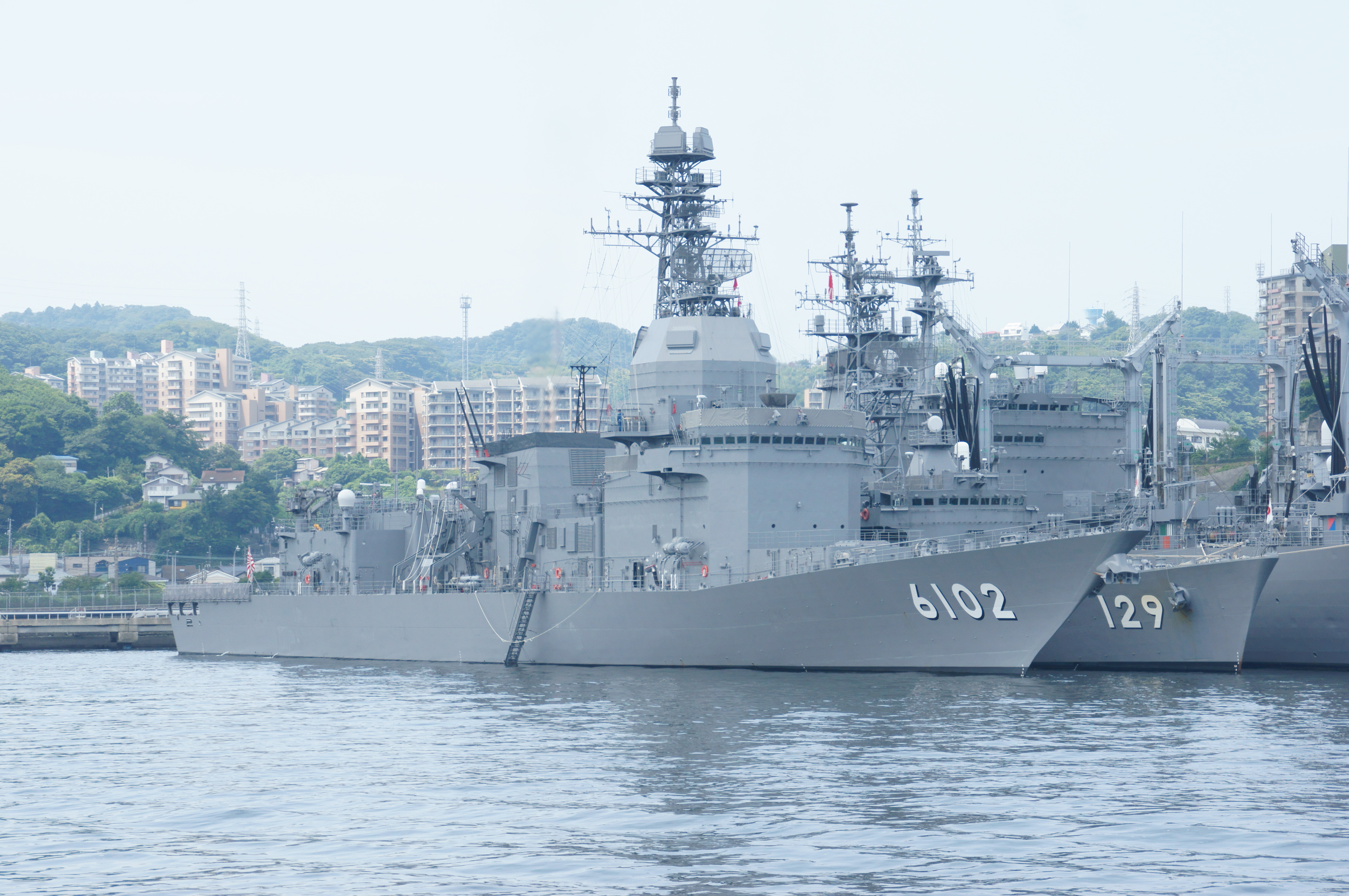
- JS Asuka

History

Japan
- Name: Asuka; (あすか)
- Namesake: Asuka
- Ordered: 1992
- Builder: Sumitomo, Tokyo
- Laid down: 21 April 1993
- Launched: 21 June 1994
- Commissioned: 22 March 1995
- Home port: Yokosuka
- Identification: MMSI number: 431999565; Pennant number: ASE-6102
- Status: Active

Class overview
- Preceded by: Kurihama class
- Succeeded by: N/A

General characteristics
- Type: Experimental ship
- Displacement: 4,250–6,200 long tons (4,318–6,299 t) full load
- Length: 151.0 m (495 ft 5 in)
- Beam: 17.3 m (56 ft 9 in)
- Draft: 5.0 m (16 ft 5 in)
- Depth: 10.0 m (32 ft 10 in)
- Propulsion: Institution COGLAG method; 2 × LM2500 gas turbine generators (43,000 PS, 32,000 kW); 2 x shafts
- Speed: 27 knots (50 km/h; 31 mph)
- Boats & landing craft carried: 2 x 9 m (30 ft) boats
- Complement: 72-100
- Sensors & processing systems: C4ISTAR Fire Control System Type 3; OPS-14; OPS-18; Sonar OQS-XX Bow / Bottom Equipment Type
- Armament: 8 cells x Mk.41 mod.17 VLS; 2 x triple short torpedo launchers
- Aircraft carried: 1 x helicopter
- Aviation facilities: Hangar and helipad

JS Asuka (ASE-6102) is an experimental ship of the Japan Maritime Self-Defense Force. The vessel was constructed by Sumitomo Heavy Industries of Tokyo, Japan and was launched on 21 June 1994. Asuka was commissioned on 22 March 1995 and since then has conducted performance confirmation tests for integrated navigation systems.

The ship operates under the command of the Maritime warfare Research and Development Command.

== Development and design ==
The hull is a blocking deck type hull. After a new surface ship sonar (OQS-XX) was installed on the bow and bottom, the bow was to be kept away from OQS-XX so as to avoid interference during anchoring and to move the breaking wave generation position as far back as possible. It protrudes sharply. The OQS-XX consists of a bow dome cylindrical array (CA) and a long flank array (FA) on the bottom of the ship, but due to budget constraints, the FA was only equipped on one side. The bridge structure consisted of four layers, at the top of which was a radar equipment room with four active phased array (AESA) antennas for the Fire Control System Type 3 (FCS-3) prototype.

After the test, parts of the FCS-3 prototype were diverted to two Hyūga-class helicopter destroyers, and all, including the AESA antenna, have been removed and the radar equipment room is covered. In addition, since 2014, a prototype of the X-band multifunction radar, which has been developed as part of the performance improvement measures for the multifunction radar (FCS-3), will be installed and a marine test will be conducted. It is expected that some of the preparatory work has already begun.

== Construction and career ==
Asuka was laid down on 21 April 1993 at Sumitomo Heavy Industries, Tokyo and launched on 21 June 1994. The vessel was commissioned on 22 March 1995. Since 1995, she has conducted performance confirmation tests for integrated navigation systems. From 1995 to 1998, OQQ-XX sonar (later OQQ-21), COGLAG propulsion method, and FCS-3 were tested. In 1998, she tested the infrared detector.

From 1999 to 2000, a new tactical information processing device (later OYQ-10) was tested. On 22 March 2002, the Development Guidance Group was abolished, and the Development Team Group was newly formed and transferred to the same group. From 2003 to 2004, tests were conducted on projection static jammers and self-propelled decoys. From 2003 to 2007, the new ASROC (later Type 07 VLA) was tested.

From 2007 to 2011, a new anti-submersible torpedo (later Type 12 torpedo) was tested. In the PSI maritime security training held in October 2007, an on-site inspection training for the escort ship Ikazuchi was conducted with the Asuka acting as the target ship. In response to the Great East Japan Earthquake caused by the Tōhoku-Pacific Ocean Earthquake that occurred on 11 March 2011, she made an emergency departure at 15:45, 53 minutes after the earthquake, to dispatch a disaster. The vessel was engaged until 21 March, resuming on 26 March, and remained engaged in disaster relief until 8 April.

In 2012, a test of a new underwater self-propelled target was conducted. In 2014, it was equipped with a radar (later OPS-48) to be installed on the Asahi-class destroyers and a radar prototyped in "Research on performance improvement of multifunction radar (FCS-3)". On 25 May 2015, a carrier-based suitability test was conducted using the MQ-8C demonstrator (mockup).

In 2017, a test was conducted of carrier-based Type 12 surface-to-ship guided missiles. In 2019, a part of the rear deck will be bulked up to test the VDS + TASS equipped on the 3,900-ton type escort ship. On 1 April 2020, the ship was reorganized from the direct control of the Development Corps to the control of the Ship Development Corps.

According to the Acquisition, Technology & Logistics Agency (ATLA), a "new ship-to-air guided missile" (A-SAM) launch test took place in December 2022. In October 2023, ATLA announced that a ship-board firing test of a railgun, the first ever of its kind in the world, was carried out on Asuka. In June and July 2025, it was reported that the Asuka has successfully fired a ship-mounted railgun at a target vessel.

== Gallery ==
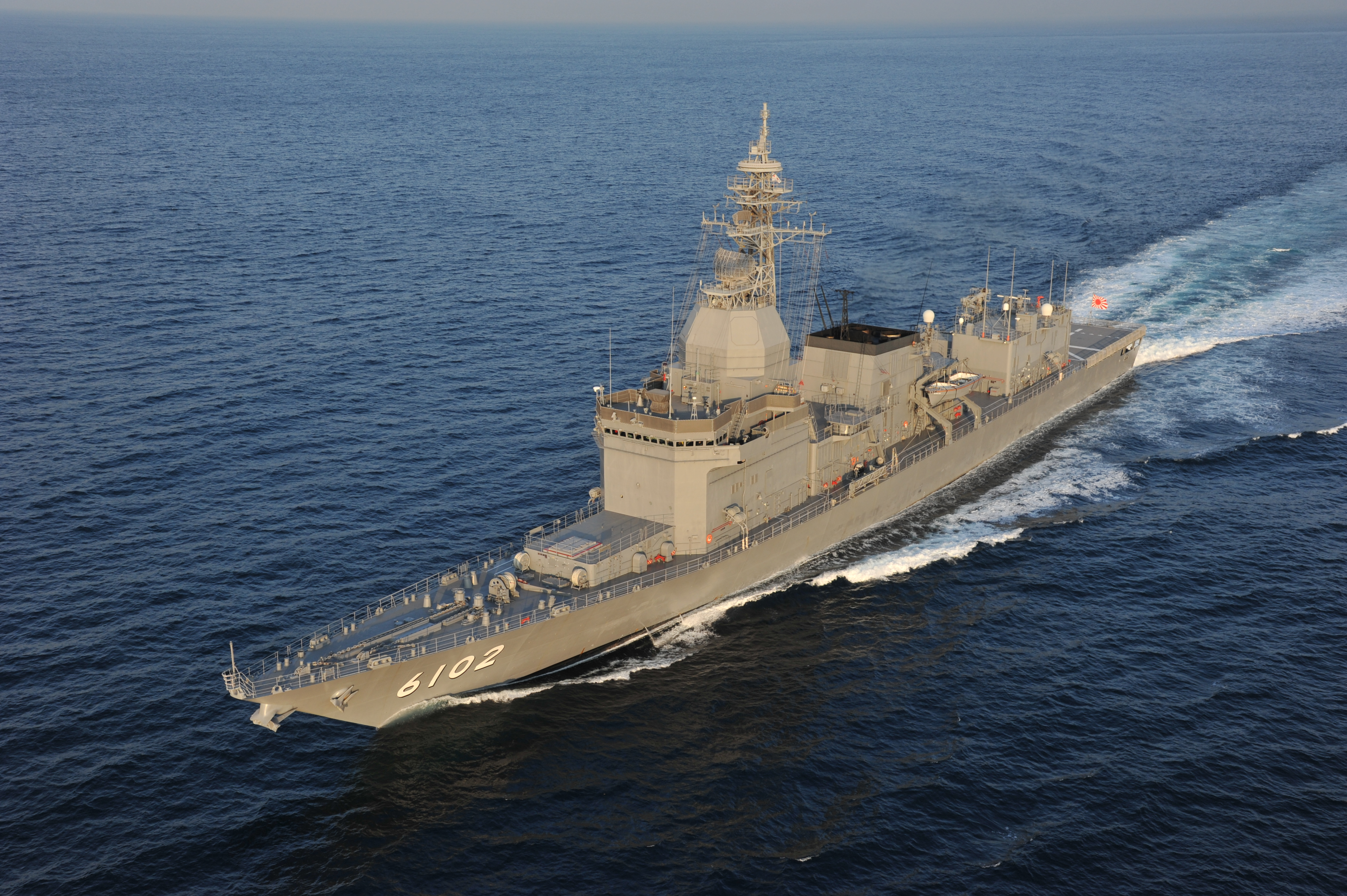
JS Asuka underway

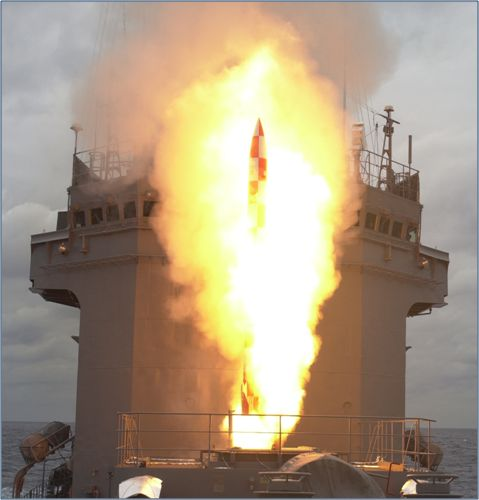
Test launch of the 07VLA

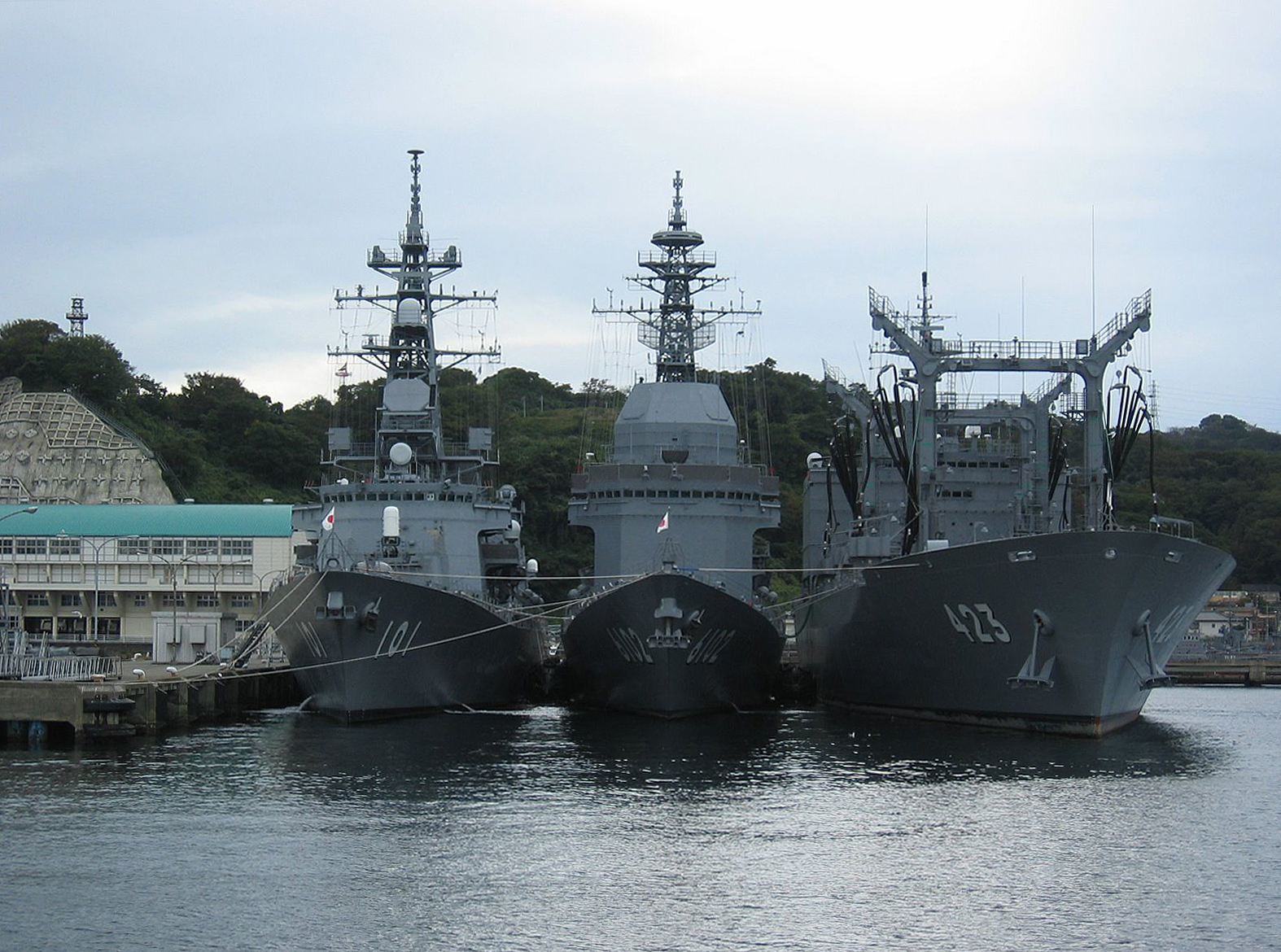
JS Murasame, JS Asuka and JS Tokiwa at Yoshikura Pier, Yokosuka, 26 October 2008

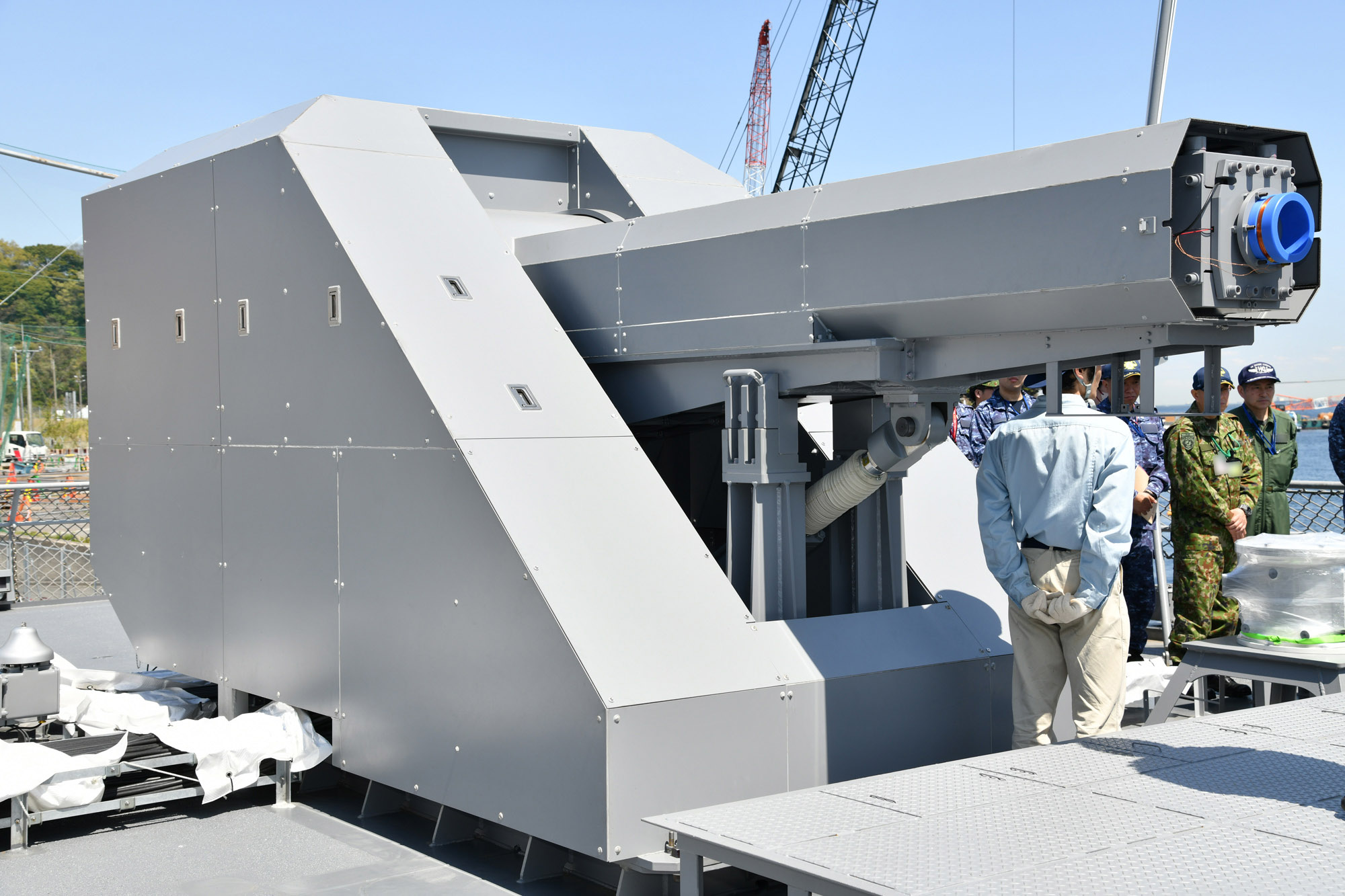
Railgun installed on JS Asuka
