= BRP Mangyan =

Auxiliary ship

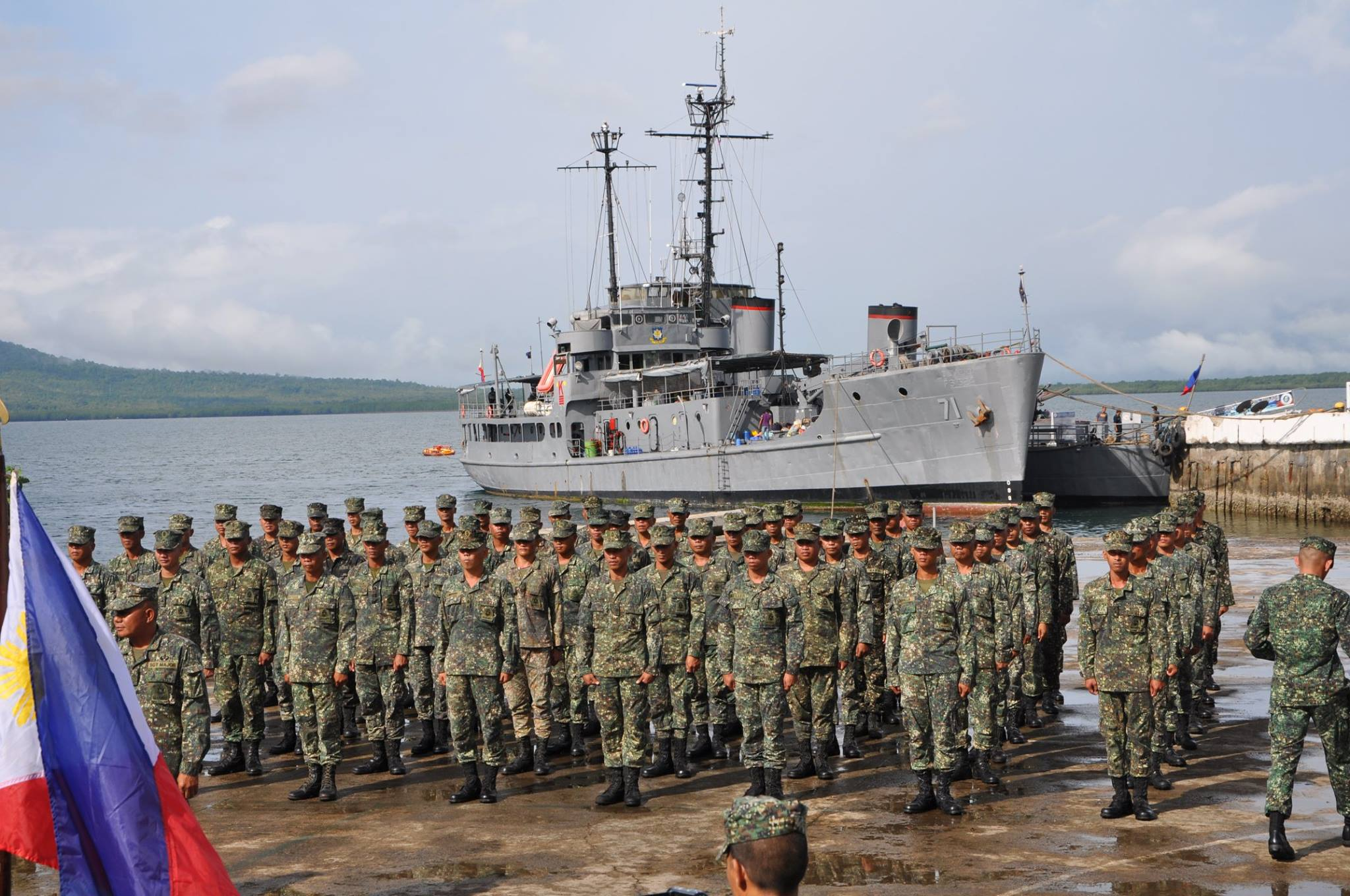

History

United States
- Name: FP/FS-524
- Operator: U.S. Army Transportation Corps
- Builder: Calumet Shipyard & Drydock Co., Chicago, Illinois
- Commissioned: 1 July 1944
- Decommissioned: 11 October 1945
- Fate: Transferred to JMSDF in 1955, reverted to US Navy in 1974. Transferred to Philippine Navy in 1978.

History

Japan
- Name: Miho
- Namesake: Miho Peninsula in Shimizu Ward of Shizuoka City
- Operator: Japan Maritime Self-Defense Force
- Commissioned: 31 March 1955
- Decommissioned: 30 September 1974
- Identification: Pennant number: MST-472
- Fate: Reverted to US Navy in 1974.

Philippines
- Name: Mangyan
- Namesake: Mangyan is the generic name for the eight indigenous groups found on the island of Mindoro, in the Philippines.
- Operator: Philippine Navy
- Acquired: 1978
- Identification: Pennant number: AS71
- Status: Active as of 2021

Class overview
- Preceded by: Nasami class (Japan)
- Succeeded by: Hayatomo class (Japan)

General characteristics
- Class & type: Design 381 coastal freighter
- Tonnage: 560 GT
- Displacement: 480 long tons (490 t) (light); 610 long tons (620 t) (full load)
- Length: 180 ft (55 m)
- Beam: 32 ft (9.8 m)
- Draft: 7 ft (2.1 m) forward, 10 ft (3.0 m) aft (full load)
- Propulsion: 2 × GM6-278A diesel engines
- Speed: 10 knots (19 km/h; 12 mph) (max)
- Endurance: 5,000 nautical miles (9,300 km; 5,800 mi)
- Armament: 1 × 81 mm (3.2 in) mortar; .50 and .30 caliber machine guns

BRP Mangyan (AS71) is an auxiliary ship of the Philippine Navy, formerly the freight supply ship U.S. Army FS-524, built for the United States Army during World War II.

== Service history ==
The vessel was commissioned on 1 July 1944, manned by Coast Guard personnel, and assigned to the South-west Pacific and Western Pacific areas. She was decommissioned on 11 October 1945.

Later turned over to the United States Navy, then she was transferred to the Japan Maritime Self-Defense Force as JDS Miho (MST-472) on 31 March 1955. Together with her sistership JDS Nasami (MST-471, ex-FS-408), they converted to the minesweeper tender. Miho was used in minesweeping missions and limited transport services until 1974.

The Philippine government acquired the ship through Foreign Military Sales (FMS) from the United States government. She underwent extensive repairs at the Maebata Shipbuilding Inc. in Sasebo, Japan in 1978 until she was finally turned over to the Philippine Navy. On 27 March 1979, she was commissioned as BRP Mangyan (AS71) named after the Mangyan peoples, an ethnic minority on Mindoro island.
