= USS Hamilton County =

WWII US naval vessel

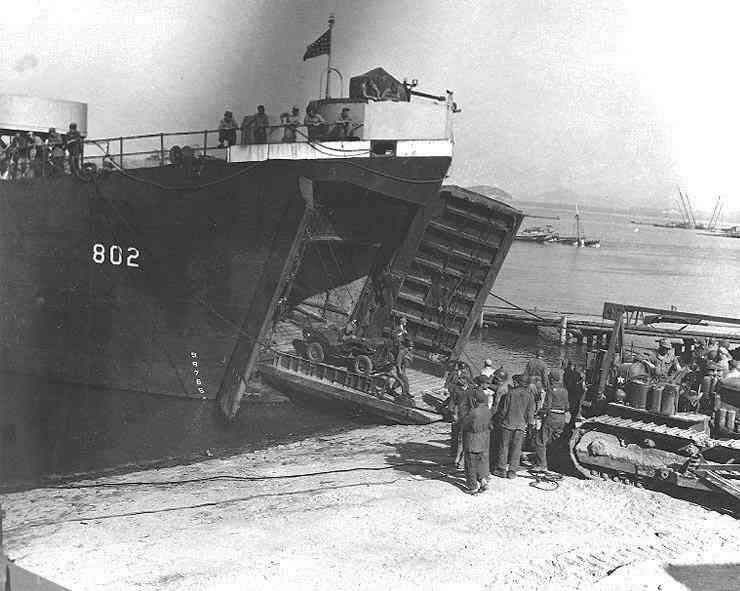
- LST-802 unloading vehicles at Inchon, South Korea, in 1950

History

United States
- Name: USS LST-802
- Builder: Jeffersonville Boat and Machine Company, Jeffersonville, Indiana
- Laid down: 2 September 1944
- Launched: 19 October 1944
- Sponsored by: Mrs. Dolores Alberts
- Commissioned: 13 November 1944
- Decommissioned: 21 July 1946
- Honors and awards: 1 battle star, World War II
- Recommissioned: 30 August 1950
- Decommissioned: 30 June 1960
- Renamed: USS Hamilton County (LST-802), 1 July 1955
- Honors and awards: 7 battle stars, Korean War
- Namesake: Hamilton County
- Decommissioned: 30 June 1960
- Fate: Transferred to Japan, 1960

History

Japan
- Name: JDS Hayatomo (MST-461)
- Acquired: 30 June 1960
- Decommissioned: 31 March 1972

Class overview
- Preceded by: Miho class
- Succeeded by: Hayase class

General characteristics
- Class & type: LST-542-class tank landing ship
- Displacement: 1,625 long tons (1,651 t) light; 4,080 long tons (4,145 t) full
- Length: 328 ft (100 m)
- Beam: 50 ft (15 m)
- Draft: Unloaded : 2 ft 4 in (0.71 m) forward; 7 ft 6 in (2.29 m) aft; Loaded : 8 ft 2 in (2.49 m) forward; 14 ft 1 in (4.29 m) aft
- Propulsion: 2 × General Motors 12-567 diesel engines, two shafts, twin rudders
- Speed: 12 knots (22 km/h; 14 mph)
- Boats & landing craft carried: 2 LCVPs
- Troops: 16 officers, 147 enlisted men
- Complement: 7 officers, 104 enlisted men
- Armament: 8 × 40 mm guns; 12 × 20 mm guns

USS Hamilton County (LST-802) was an LST-542-class tank landing ship built for the United States Navy during World War II. Named after counties in Florida, Illinois, Indiana, Iowa, Kansas, Nebraska, New York, Ohio, Tennessee, and Texas, she was the only U.S. Naval vessel to bear the name.

She was originally laid down as LST-802 on 2 September 1944 at Jeffersonville, Indiana, by the Jeffersonville Boat and Machine Company, launched on 19 October 1944, sponsored by Mrs. Dolores Alberts, and commissioned on 13 November 1944.

== Service history ==
=== World War II ===
Following shakedown off Florida, LST-802 loaded quonset hut sections at Gulfport, Mississippi, and departed New Orleans on 18 December. Steaming via the Canal Zone and San Francisco, she arrived Pearl Harbor on 4 February 1945. After unloading, she sailed two weeks later for the Solomon Islands, arriving Guadalcanal on 7 March. LST-802 departed Guadalcanal on the 18th; transported Marines to Guam; then arrived Saipan on 3 April to prepare for the Okinawa invasion. She embarked over 150 Seabees at Saipan and sailed on the 12th for the Ryukyu Islands. Arriving off Chimu Wan, Okinawa Shima on 17 April she unloaded men and equipment to strengthen the beachhead and facilitate the flow of supplies to the troops. For the remainder of World War II LST-802 shuttled troops and equipment between Okinawa and the Philippines.

=== Inter-war activity ===
Following the war, LST-802 performed occupation duty in the Far East until mid-April, 1946. The ship was decommissioned on 21 July 1946 and transferred to the Shipping Control Authority, Japan, until returned to the Navy to serve in Korea.

=== Korean War ===
To assist in the transportation of cargo and troops, LST-802 was re-commissioned at Yokosuka on 30 August 1950. Sailing to Kobe, she embarked units of the 1st Marine Division, for the invasion of Inchon; then departing Japan on 10 September, she arrived off "Blue Beach" five days later. The Marines stormed ashore, prompting General Douglas MacArthur's famous remark "The Navy and Marines have never shone more brightly than this morning." LST-802 continued loading equipment and supplies until 15 October when she joined a task group for Wonsan. Following a month of cargo operations at Wonsan, she returned to Yokosuka for replenishment. In mid-December she was en route to Hŭngnam, where she assisted in the evacuation of United States and South Korean Forces. During January, 1951 she shuttled troops and prisoners-of-war along the Korean coast, then on 20 March she departed Yokosuka for a stateside overhaul. Returning to the war zone eight months later, LST-802 resumed cargo and troop transport duty between Japan and Korea. From November, 1951 to June, 1952 the veteran landing ship performed cargo operations, evacuation services, and harbor control duties in the vicinity of Korea. Following another brief period in the United States, LST-802 resumed operations in the Far East, just as the Korean War ended; and remained there until February, 1954.

=== Pacific Fleet ===
One year later she was again operating in the Far East during the First Taiwan Strait Crisis. When People's Republic of China artillery threatened Nationalist Chinese positions on the islands, the veteran LST and other 7th Fleet units evacuated forces and supplies to Formosa. On 1 July 1955 LST-802 was redesignated USS Hamilton County (LST-802), then operated off the California coast from August, 1955 to August, 1956.

After returning to the Western Pacific in mid-October, 1956 Hamilton County was assigned as the flagship of Commander, Mine Squadron 3, (who concurrently served as Commander Task Group 70.5 and Commander Mine flotilla 1), U.S. Pacific Fleet. Homeported in Sasebo, Japan she served as a command vessel for numerous combined mine sweeping training exercises with minesweepers of the Japanese, Korean, Chinese Nationalist, Filipino and Thai Navies. ()

=== Transfer to Japan ===
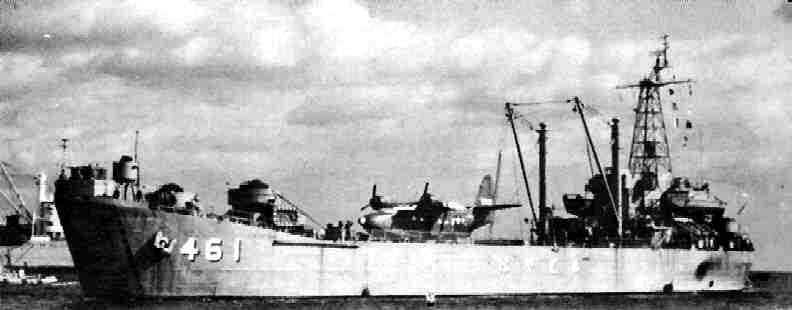
The ex-USS Hamilton County (LST-802) in Japanese service as JDS Hayatomo (MSL-461) at anchor, date and location unknown. Note the U.S. Air Force HU-16 Albatross seaplane atop her main deck.

Loaned to Japan on 20 April 1960 under terms of the Military Assistance Program, Hamilton County was decommissioned at Sasebo on 30 June 1960 and struck from the Naval Vessel Register on 1 July that same year. She then served the Japan Maritime Self-Defense Force as JDS Hayatomo (MST-461). She was used as a minesweeper tender until 1972.

LST-802 earned one battle star for World War II service and seven stars for the Korean War.
