= JDS Hayase =

JMSDF minesweeper

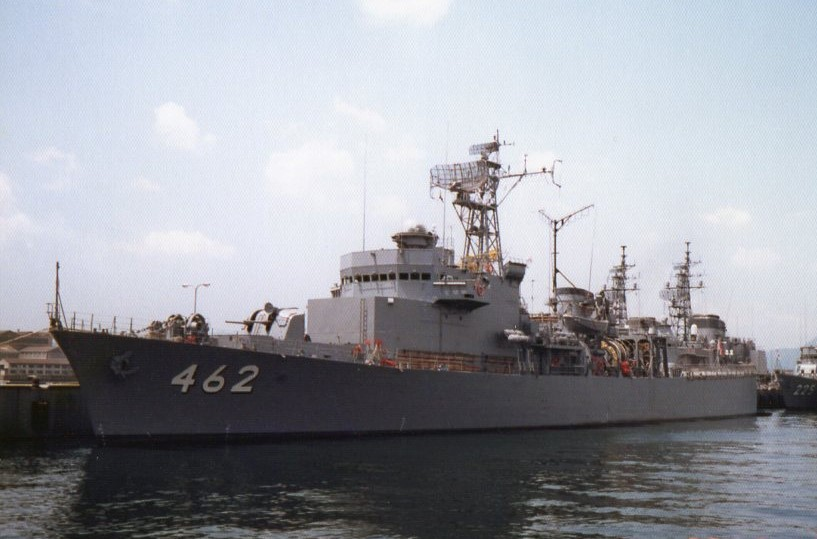
- JDS Hayase in 1986

History

Japan
- Name: Hayase; (はやせ)
- Ordered: 1969
- Builder: IHI, Tokyo
- Laid down: 16 September 1970
- Launched: 21 June 1971
- Commissioned: 6 November 1971
- Decommissioned: 11 December 2002
- Reclassified: ASU-7020
- Home port: Kure
- Identification: Pennant number: MST-462
- Fate: Scrapped

Class overview
- Preceded by: Hayatomo class
- Succeeded by: Uraga class

General characteristics
- Type: Minesweeper
- Displacement: 2,000 t (2,000 long tons) standard; 3,050 t (3,000 long tons) full load
- Length: 99 m (325 ft)
- Beam: 14.5 m (48 ft)
- Draft: 4.2 m (14 ft)
- Depth: 8.4 m (27 ft 7 in)
- Propulsion: 4 × Kawasaki MAN V6 V22 30ATL Diesel; 2 × axes
- Speed: 18 knots (33 km/h; 21 mph)
- Complement: 180
- Sensors & processing systems: OPS-39C; OPS-14; OPS-17; AN/SPG-34; SQS-11A; ZQS-1B; Sonar
- Armament: 1 × Twin 3-inch/50-caliber naval gun; 2 × Oerlikon 20 mm cannon; 2 × Mark 32 Surface Vessel Torpedo Tubes
- Aviation facilities: Hangar

JDS Hayase (MST-462) was a minesweeper for the Japan Maritime Self-Defense Force.

== Development ==
The Maritime Self-Defense Force purchased the LST-542 class tank landing ship USS Hamilton County, which was retired from the U.S. Navy, and after making certain modifications, she has been operating as a mine sweeper tender JDS Hayatomo since June 1960. The ship was useful as a tender, except that she had plenty of space inside her and was sluggish, but she was completed in 1944 and was an old ship, and it was hoped that her replacement ship will be built.

Therefore, a new mine sweeper tender was to be built in the 1969 plan during the Third Defense Build-up Plan.

== Design ==
In terms of design, JDS Sōya has much in common built in the same year's plan, except this ship has two deck layers. She has a flush deck with a strong shears on the bow and stern. In addition, in order to save construction costs, the hull structure relies on the ship design standards of the Defense Agency, but the work method adopts the work standards of the shipyard side, and most of the hull structural materials use NK standard materials. However, the use of high-strength steel has been partially stopped, and the ship price has been reduced by using general marine products for the accessories.

Her rear deck is said to be the helicopter deck, which corresponds to the arrival and departure of the KV-107II-3 minesweeping helicopter operated by the JMSDF at the time of planning. Although it does not have helicopter loading capacity, it was equipped with a power source for starting, an aerial refueling device, a fire extinguishing device, a motor cleaning device, and a tank for aviation fuel (JP-5). Below that, a mine storage was installed in the latter half of the second deck, and it also had the ability to lay mines with the mine laying device Type 2. There are a total of 5 mines laying rails, 3 on the port side and 2 on the starboard side, and the number of mines loaded was 115 for 3000-pound class mines, and the moored 66-Type mines. In the case of (K-15), it was said to be 250.

As for armament, in addition to diverting the 68-type 50-caliber 3-inch twin rapid-fire gun that was equipped on the dismissed JDS Wakaba, it was equipped with two Mk.10 20mm single-armed guns for mine disposal. It also had limited anti-submarine capability due to the SQS-11A medium-frequency sonar and the 68-type triple short torpedo launcher.

As a mine sweeper tender, which was the original mission of Hayase, it was considered that one ship could support the five mine warfare forces at that time. Replenishment of minesweepers is assumed to be carried out at the harbor, and does not correspond to high lines. A break-action crane with a capacity of 5 tons is installed just in front of the stern deck, and is used to replenish the minesweepers on both sides and to move the minesweepers. As a supply peculiar to the mine sweeper tender, there were cables such as the mine sweeper tender, which were wound around the reels on both sides of the rear upper structure. A workshop, forging room, electrical maintenance room, and accessory warehouse are set up inside the ship to repair parts of the main engine of the minesweeper and the minesweeper generator, and to adjust the radar and mine detector. A recompression chamber was also installed in case the underwater diver suffered from decompression sickness.

== Construction and career ==
Hayase was laid down on 16 September 1970 and launched on 21 June 1971 by IHI Corporation Tokyo Shipyard. She was commissioned on 6 November 1971 and was incorporated into the 1st Mine Warfare Force as a flagship and deployed to Kure.

In 1988, she replaced two 20mm single-barreled machine guns with two JM61-M 20mm multi-barreled machine guns.

In April 1991, she was dispatched as the flagship of the minesweeper to the post-Gulf War Persian Gulf minesweeping mission, which was the first overseas dispatch of the Self-Defense Forces after the war, and engaged in command and support missions for minesweepers.

On 20 March 1998, she was reclassified as a mission ship and her registration number changed to ASU-7020. She was transferred to the 1st Submarine Group as a ship under direct control.

Due to aging and obsolescence of equipment and Uraga-class mine countermeasure vessel began construction and service. Hayase was decommissioned on 11 December 2002 after the commissioning of JDS Bungo. Her total itinerary during her commissioning is 414,164.1 nautical miles, about 20 laps of the globe.

Her anchor is preserved at Kotohira Shrine.
