= JDS Erimo =

Minelayer of the JMSDF

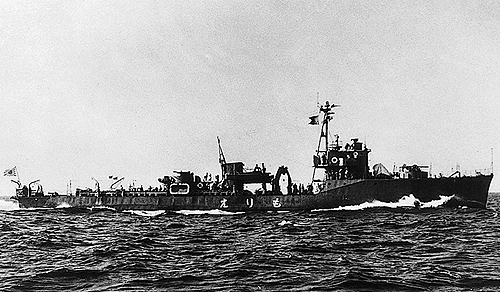
- JDS Erimo

History

Japan
- Name: Erimo; (えりも)
- Namesake: Erimo
- Ordered: 1953
- Builder: UDC, Uraga
- Laid down: 10 December 1954
- Launched: 12 July 1955
- Commissioned: 28 December 1955
- Decommissioned: 27 March 1982
- Reclassified: YAS-69
- Home port: Kure
- Identification: Pennant number: AMC-491
- Fate: Unknown

Class overview
- Preceded by: N/A
- Succeeded by: Sōya class

General characteristics
- Type: Minesweeper
- Displacement: 634 t (624 long tons) standard; 700 t (690 long tons) full load
- Length: 66 m (216 ft 6 in)
- Beam: 7.9 m (25 ft 11 in)
- Draft: 2.64 m (8 ft 8 in)
- Depth: 4.6 m (15 ft 1 in)
- Propulsion: 2 × Sasebo 5LKT42 / 56 diesel electric engines; 2 × shafts
- Speed: 18 kn (33 km/h; 21 mph)
- Complement: 85
- Sensors & processing systems: AN/SPS-5 surface-search radar; Mark 51 fire control system
- Armament: 1 × twin Oerlikon 40mm gun; 2 × single Oerlikon 20mm guns; 1 × Hedgehog; 2 × K cannons

JDS Erimo (AMC-491) was a minelayer of Japan Maritime Self-Defense Force (JMSDF) in the mid-1950s.

== Construction and career ==
Erimo was laid down on 10 December 1954 and launched on 12 July 1955 by Uraga Dock Company Uraga Shipyard. She was commissioned on 28 December 1955 and was homeported in Yokosuka under the Mine Warfare Force.

She joined the Kure District Force on June 1, 1958.

She joined the 1st Mine Warfare Force on May 1, 1960, in Kure.

She joined the 2nd Mine Warfare Force on September 1, 1961, in Yokosuka.

She returned to the 1st Mine Warfare Force on March 15, 1969.

On March 31, 1976, she was reclassified as an auxiliary vessel, her registration number was changed to YAS-69, and she became the mother ship of the Explosive Ordnance Corps belonging to the Kure. When she was reclassified into an auxiliary vessel, she was equipped with a soft-ball submersible, and the mine-loading hoist and part of the minelaying rails were removed. In addition, the mine-mounted crane in the center was removed and replaced by a new diving instrument.

She was decommissioned on March 27, 1982. Her mileage since her commissioning until removal was about 720,000 kilometers.
