= JDS Sōya =

Minelayer of JMSDF

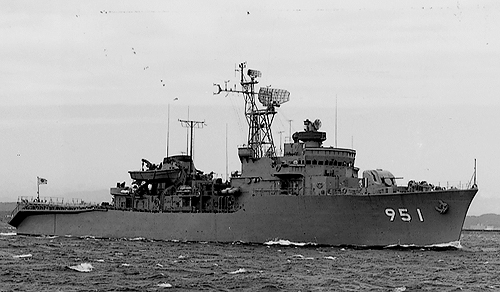
- JDS Sōya

History

Japan
- Name: Sōya; (そうや)
- Namesake: Sōya
- Ordered: 1969
- Builder: Hitachi, Maizuru
- Laid down: 9 July 1970
- Launched: 31 March 1971
- Commissioned: 30 September 1971
- Decommissioned: 24 March 1999
- Home port: Yokosuka
- Identification: Pennant number: MCC-951
- Fate: Unknown

Class overview
- Preceded by: Erimo class
- Succeeded by: N/A

General characteristics
- Type: Minelayer
- Displacement: 2,150 t (2,120 long tons) standard; 3,300 t (3,200 long tons) full load
- Length: 99.0 m (324 ft 10 in)
- Beam: 15 m (49 ft 3 in)
- Draft: 4.23 m (13 ft 11 in)
- Depth: 8.4 m (27 ft 7 in)
- Propulsion: 4 × Kawasaki MAN V6 V22 / 30ATL diesel electric engines; 2 × shafts
- Speed: 18 kn (33 km/h; 21 mph)
- Complement: 180
- Sensors & processing systems: OPS-14 air search radar; OPS-16C surface-search radar; SQS-11A sonar; ZQS-1B mine-hunting sonar; FCS-1 fire-control system
- Armament: 1 × twin 3"/50 caliber guns; 2 × single Oerlikon 20 mm machine guns; 2 × Type 68 Triple Short Torpedo Launcher
- Aviation facilities: Helipad

JDS Sōya (MMC-951) was an minelayer of Japan Maritime Self-Defense Force (JMSDF) in the early 1970s.

== Overview ==
She is the first minelaying ship of the Maritime Self-Defense Force, and in addition to the minelaying mission, she also serve as a flagship for the Mine Warfare Force.

When designing, she has a commercial ship structure based on the commercial ship rules in consideration of economic efficiency like JDS Hayase, but in consideration of combat behavior and danger at the time of lightning, she has defensive weapons. It has anti-shock measures similar to those of an escort ship.

Due to the laying of mines, the second deck of the ship is considered to be a mine storage for all mines, and the number of mines loaded is 266 for 3000-pound class mines. Due to the larger mine storage, the ship type became a poop deck. There are 6 minelaying rails on the middle deck and 2nd on the upper deck. The rails on the upper deck slope downward along the rear side, and the drop position is the same height as the rails on the middle deck.

The Sōya mine laying device is a state-of-the-art automatic mine laying device that was unprecedented in the world at that time. The mines that were dropped and laid are automatically displayed on the mine battle command room and the electric display board of the CIC so that the laying status can be known.

The bridge structure has a command room, a command office, a staff office, and a general affairs office of the headquarters as equipment as a flagship of the Mine Warfare Force. In addition, the CIC is arranged with an internal partition for individual ships and for the command center.

The rear deck is equipped with a helicopter deck to accommodate the arrival and departure of the V-107. As a helicopter support facility, an aerial refueling device, a power source for starting, a fire extinguishing device, a motor cleaning device, and a tank for aviation fuel (JP-5) are provided.

In addition, she has a supply facility to support minesweepers, and a break-action 5-ton crane for relocation is installed just before the helicopter deck. She is also equipped with equipment for underwater disposal teams and a recompression tank.

As gun weapons, the front deck is equipped with a 68-type 50 caliber 3-inch twin rapid-fire gun, and the Mk.10 20mm single-armed gun is installed on both sides of the rear end of the deck chamber. In addition, as anti-submarine weapons, the SQS-11A search sonar and the 68-type triple torpedo launcher are equipped on both sides of the central deck.

== Construction and career ==
Sōya was laid down on 9 July 1970 and launched on 31 March 1971 by Hitachi Zosen Corporation Maizuru Shipyard. She was commissioned on 30 September 1971 and was incorporated It was incorporated into the 2nd Mine Warfare Force as a flagship and deployed in Yokosuka.

On January 22, 1977, due to a change in ship type classification, the ship type name of the laying ship (MMC) was changed to minelaying ship.

In 1988, two 20mm single-arm guns were removed and two JM61-M 20mm machine guns were installed.

She was decommissioned on November 29, 1996. Her total itinerary during her commission reached approximately 295,000 nautical miles.

Due to the removal of Sōya, minelayer was deleted from the types of self-defense ships owned by the Maritime Self-Defense Force.
