= Uraga-class mine countermeasure vessel =

Class of Japanese mine countermeasure vessels

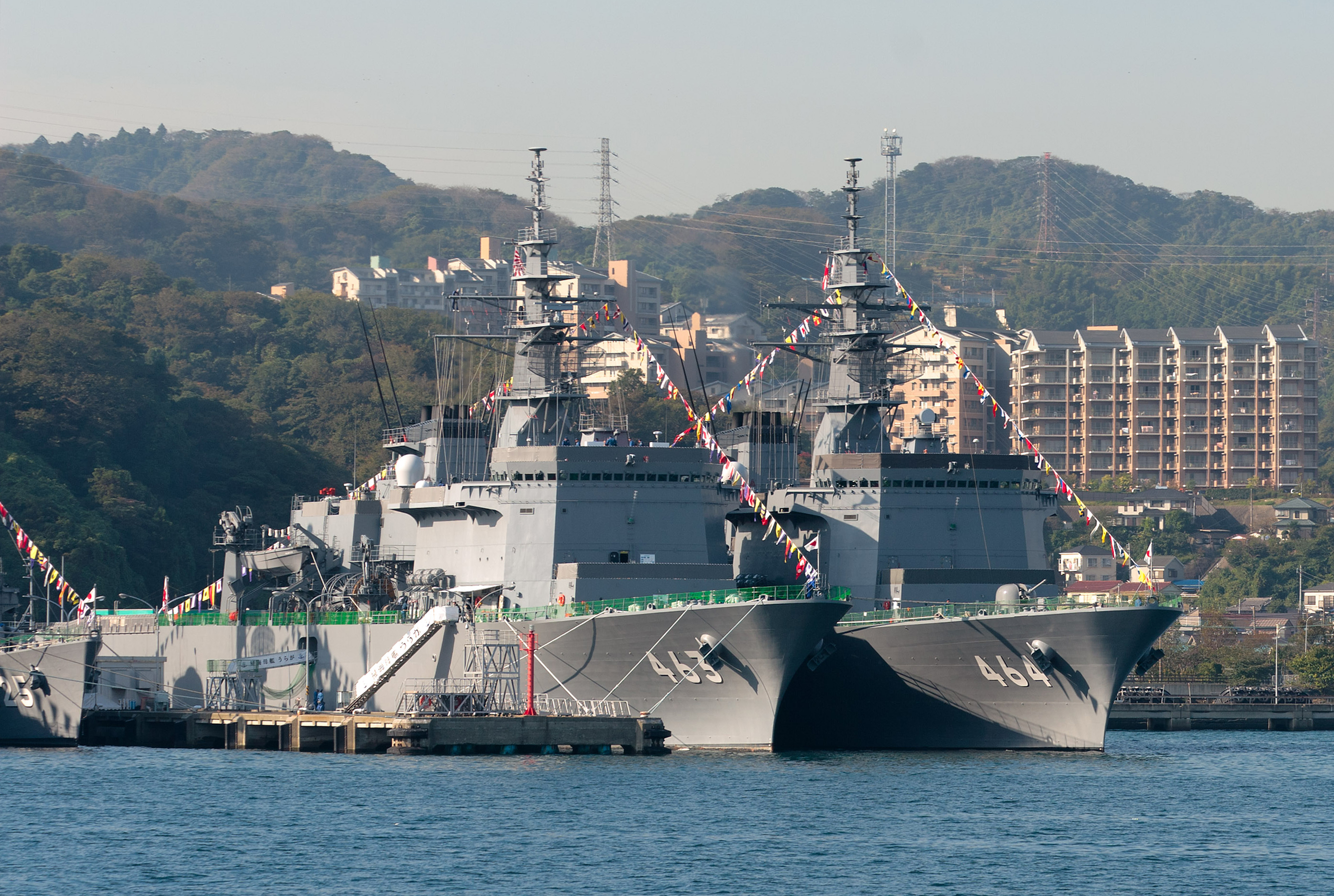
- JS Uraga and JS Bungo

Class overview
- Name: Uraga class
- Builders: Mitsui Engineering & Shipbuilding, Tamano; Hitachi Zosen Corporation, Maizuru
- Operators: Japan Maritime Self-Defense Force
- Preceded by: Hayase class; Sōya class
- Succeeded by: N/A
- Built: 1995-1997
- In commission: 1997 - present
- Planned: 2
- Completed: 2
- Active: 2

General characteristics
- Type: Mine countermeasures vessel
- Displacement: 5,650 t (5,560 long tons) standard; 6,850 t (6,740 long tons) full load
- Length: 141 m (463 ft)
- Beam: 22 m (72 ft)
- Draft: 14 m (46 ft)
- Depth: 5.4 m (17 ft 9 in)
- Propulsion: 2 × Mitsui 12V42M-A Diesel; 2 × axes
- Speed: 22 knots (41 km/h; 25 mph)
- Complement: 170
- Sensors & processing systems: OPS-39C; OPS-14C; OPS-20; Type 3 minelaying device; Mk105 aeromagnetic device; Mk104 aeronautical device; Type 81 fire control system; Sonar
- Electronic warfare & decoys: NOLR-8; Mk.137 Decoy launcher
- Armament: 1 × OTO Melara 76mm naval gun; 2 × Oerlikon 20 mm cannon; 2 × M2 Browning
- Aviation facilities: Hangar and helipad

The Uraga class was a class of two mine countermeasure vessels for the Japan Maritime Self-Defense Force, built and commissioned in the 1990s.

== Development ==
The class was built as an alternative to JDS Hayase and JDS Sōya, as the ships combined the functions of both. Building on the experience of Hayase, which was dispatched to the Persian Gulf, the function of the ships was improved, and the newly introduced air minesweeper (Mk.105) was introduced and acquired from the dock. A helicopter support function for performing air minesweeping was also required. As a result, they became considerably larger, and although they were finally made slightly smaller than the originally planned 5,600 tons, the amount of wastewater is still doubled compared to 44MST.

The construction of the name ship was approved for 29.7 billion yen in the 1994 plan, which is the latter half of the 2003 medium-term defense. The construction of the second ship was also approved in the following year's plan.

== Design ==
The ships have many design elements in common with the 8,900-ton transport ship (05LST) planned in parallel, such as the bulbous bow and the stealth tower mast. A flat deck ship type is adopted, and in the main hull from the center of the hull to the stern there are well decks in the center and mine storages on both sides, which are equivalent to two layers of the second and third decks, respectively. It is installed at a height and has a gate that opens and closes hydraulically at the stern. Of the gates, the large one in the center is for aviation minesweepers and is said to be a lower hinge type. On the other hand, the small ones on both sides are connected to the mine storage and are of the upper hinge type.

The flight deck has a fairly large area to support the MH-53E helicopter. The rear part of the superstructure located in front of it is used as a maintenance hangar for air minesweepers. The helicopter deck and the well deck are connected by an elevator, and normally the aviation sweeping equipment maintained in the maintenance hangar on the first deck is returned to the hangar by the elevator and dropped and collected from there. The rear port crane force is said to be 8 tons so that it can be dropped and picked up from the deck.

Although the ship was designed with consideration for stealth, the main hull was not intentionally tilted in consideration of the case where the minesweeper was replenished sideways. In addition, for horizontal replenishment, a recess is attached to the second deck level, and equipment such as a gate is provided.

Like the 05LST, the main engine was also equipped with the 12V42M-A (9,900bhp / 600rpm), a 4-cycle V-type 12-cylinder medium-speed diesel engine manufactured by Mitsui Engineering & Shipbuilding.

== Ships in class ==
Uraga class
Hull no.	Name	Builder	Laid down	Launched	Commissioned	Status
MST-463	Uraga	Hitachi Zosen Corporation, Maizuru	19 May 1995	22 May 1996	19 March 1997	Active
MST-464	Bungo	Mitsui Engineering & Shipbuilding, Tamano	4 July 1996	24 April 1997	23 March 1998	Active
